= Pashtun National Jirga =

2024 meeting in Kyber District, Pakistan

- Native name: پښتون قامي جرګه
- English name: Pashtun National Court
- Date: October 11–13, 2024
- Time: (PKT)
- Duration: 3 days
- Location: Khyber District, Khyber Pakhtunkhwa, Pakistan
- Also known as: Khyber Jirga; Pashtun National Court
- Type: Political / national assembly / jirga
- Theme: Rights, security, socio-economic issues of Pashtuns
- Organised by: Pashtun Tahafuz Movement (PTM)
- Participants: Representatives and delegates from ~80 groups, district delegates, civil society, political and tribal representatives
- Outcome: Formation of organizing committee; drafted resolutions on Pashtun rights, autonomy, and development; public announcement of future agenda
- Website: pashtunjirga.org

The Pashtun National Jirga (PNJ; Pashto: پښتون قامي جرګه) or Pashtun National Court (پښتون قامي عدالت), also known as the Khyber Jirga (خېبر جرګه), commenced on 11 October 2024 under the leadership of the Pashtun Tahafuz Movement (PTM) in the Khyber District of Khyber Pakhtunkhwa, Pakistan. The jirga was set to address key issues affecting the Pashtuns, including security concerns, political autonomy, and socio-economic challenges in the region of Pashtunistan.

Building on the outcomes of previous jirgas, including the 2022 Bannu Jirga, this gathering sought to further discussions on Pashtun rights, unity, autonomy, culture, language, and economic conditions. Historically, Pashtun jirgas have provided a platform for addressing collective concerns, promoting dialogue on peace, political reform, and indigenous rights. The Khyber Jirga aimed to include Pashtuns and minority groups from all backgrounds to shape a shared vision for the reconstruction and development of the Pashtun nation.

On 9 October 2024, four PTM members were killed and over two dozens others were injured during a crackdown by the Pakistani police against the PTM ahead of the Khyber Jirga. In December 2024, members of the Pashtun National Jirga, led by Malik Naseer Kokikhel Afridi, Mufti Munir Shakir, and Mufti Kifayatullah Swati, visited Kurram District to mediate a Shia–Sunni conflict between two groups of Pashtuns tribes.

== Objectives ==
1. Security and Counterterrorism: Addressing the rise in militant activities and the socio-political impact on the Pashtun belt.
2. Autonomy and Governance: Discussions on the implementation of policies that affect the Pashtun region of Khyber Pakhtunkhwa and northern Balochistan, including the Newly Merged Tribal Districts after the merger of the former Federally Administered Tribal Areas into the Khyber Pakhtunkhwa province.
3. Socio-Economic Development: Assessing the economic marginalization of Pashtun regions and proposing plans for development and infrastructure improvement.
4. Human Rights and Cultural Identity: Protecting Pashtun cultural identity in the face of modern challenges while advocating for human rights and justice.

The assembly was expected to draw leaders from across the political and social spectrum, uniting factions that have historically been divided.

== Agenda ==
=== Day 1: Public session – data presentation and testimonies ===
The first day (11 October 2024) of the Pashtun National Jirga would open with a public session focused on presenting data regarding the effects of war, military operations, and socio-economic challenges faced by Pashtuns. The morning would begin with an official opening ceremony, followed by a detailed visual and statistical presentation on the damages caused by the imposed wars on Pashtuns, enforced disappearances, and the displacement of civilians. Firsthand testimonies from witnesses in affected districts would offer personal perspectives on these impacts. The day would end with concluding remarks by a lead presenter, summarizing the key data points and setting the stage for deeper discussions on Day 2.

=== Day 2: Private session – delegates' deliberations ===
The second day (12 October 2024) would feature closed-door deliberations, where delegates from the Pashtun-majority districts and 35 interest groups, such as political parties, women's groups, and unions, would gather to discuss the major issues facing Pashtuns. Each group would analyze problems related to governance, human rights, political representation, and land disputes. Following these discussions, the delegates would elect representatives and work on drafting resolutions. The resolutions would focus on political, social, and economic rights, and would be submitted to the organizing committee by the evening.

=== Day 3: Public session – formation of the Pashtun National Jirga Organizing Committee ===
The third day (13 October 2024) would mark the formation of the Pashtun National Jirga Organizing Committee. Representatives from about 80 groups, including district delegates and interest groups, would converge to present their drafted resolutions. In the afternoon, an organizing committee would be elected, tasked with leading the jirga’s future efforts. The newly elected members would outline a comprehensive agenda and strategy for the movement going forward. The jirga would conclude with final speeches from key leaders, the public announcement of resolutions, and a ceremonial oath-taking by the organizing committee members.

== Previous Pashtun Jirgas ==
=== Bannu Jirga ===
The Bannu Jirga was held at Mirakhel Cricket Ground in Bannu, Khyber Pakhtunkhwa, from 11 to 14 March 2022 to discuss the critical issues faced by the Pashtuns in Pakistan and Afghanistan. It was attended by about 5,000 delegates, including politicians, tribal chiefs, researchers, clerics, religious minorities, women and human rights activists.

Mahmood Khan Achakzai, Nawab Ayaz Jogezai, Muhammad Khan Achakzai, Abdul Rahim Ziaratwal, Abdul Qahar Wadan, Obaidullah Babat, Nasrullah Zayrai, Khushal Kakar, and Arfa Siddiq of the Pashtunkhwa Milli Awami Party (PMAP), Manzoor Pashteen, Mir Kalam, Sanna Ejaz and Wranga Loni of the Pashtun Tahafuz Movement (PTM), Mohsin Dawar, Latif Afridi, Afrasiab Khattak, Basheer Matta, Bushra Gohar and Jamila Gilani of the National Democratic Movement (NDM), Khadim Hussain and Maulana Khanzeb of the Awami National Party (ANP), Afzal Khamosh of the Mazdoor Kisan Party (MKP), Farhatullah Babar and Ahmad Kundi of the Pakistan Peoples Party (PPP), Sardar Yaqoob Nasar of the Pakistan Muslim League (PMLN), Muhammad Khan Sherani of Jamiat Ulema-e-Islam Pakistan Abdul Ahad khan kakar of Jamiat Ulema-e-Islam]] (JUI), Chief of Waziristan Gul Alam Wazir, minority rights activist William Jan Barkat, historian Parvesh Shaheen, and numerous other Pashtun, Baloch and Hazara leaders were part of the jirga. The resolutions were also endorsed by several Afghan political leaders, including Hamid Karzai, Haneef Atmar and Amrullah Saleh.

The jirga declared that Pashtuns were victims of Pakistan's war on terror since 2002, with 60,000 out of the 70,000 Pakistanis killed being Pashtuns. "In the current situation, Pashtuns have over 8,000 missing youth," remarked Manzoor Pashteen. Power over resources, women's rights, and the status of Pashto and other native languages in Khyber Pakhtunkhwa and Balochistan were discussed, and a united Pashtun province comprising Khyber Pakhtunkhwa, North Balochistan and Mianwali was proposed. The participants demanded that a representative government be formed in Afghanistan through a loya jirga and general election that is in line with all international standards. The jirga expressed concerns over Afghanistan's humanitarian crisis, appealed to the international community to help the Afghans, and denounced the barbed barrier along the Durand Line. The jirga also demanded the immediate release of all political prisoners including Ali Wazir.

==== Background ====
At the funeral of Usman Kakar in Muslim Bagh on 23 June 2021, Mahmood Khan Achakzai announced in his speech that he would convene a jirga in Bannu within three months to discuss the major problems affecting Pashtuns, such as insecurity and power over their resources, and to find solutions. The jirga was later postponed until 11 March 2022.

Non-Pashtun leaders were also welcome to join the jirga in Bannu. At the inauguration of the jirga, Achakzai stated: "The Gujjar have come to this jirga, people of Gilgit have come, and everyone who lives with us in our region is our brother [or sister]."

==== Historical significance of Bannu ====
The choice of Bannu for hosting the jirga had historical significance. On 21 June 1947, the city was host to the Bannu Resolution, in which Pashtun politicians demanded that the British Empire give them the option of independence for Pashtunistan, comprising all Pashtun territories in British India, rather than making them join the new Dominion of Pakistan.

The city was also home to the Faqir of Ipi (Mirzali Khan) during his student life, who would later lead a guerilla fight against the British Empire and Pakistan from his base in Gurwek, North Waziristan.

==== The 25 points ====
During the concluding session on 14 March 2022, the Bannu Jirga demanded that:

1. This representative Pashtun National Jirga be an independent entity. In order to implement its decisions and objectives, a committee of cooperation and coordination be set up, and sub-committees be set up under the supervision of that committee. A sub-committee be formed for reconciliation in the Pashtun tribal areas;
2. A true federal parliamentary democracy be restored in Pakistan. The supremacy of the constitution and sovereignty of the parliament be ensured, and the interference of intelligence agencies in politics be stopped;
3. The formulation and implementation of Pakistan's domestic and foreign policies be done only through an elected parliament;
4. An elected government representing all peoples be established in Afghanistan through a loya jirga and general election, and the forcible overthrow of future Afghan governments be considered illegal and betrayal of the Afghan nation. A democratic system that conforms to modern world standards be implemented;
5. The Afghan people affected by the humanitarian crisis of Afghanistan be helped by the United Nations and the neighboring countries, and Afghan refugees and homeless people be treated lawfully and humanely;
6. A united national province comprising Khyber Pakhtunkhwa, North Balochistan and Isakhel be created. Until the formation of that province, equality between the Pashtuns and Balochs be recognized in all spheres of life in the province of Balochistan;
7. A truth and reconciliation commission be set up for the war raging in the Pakhtunkhwa region for decades, and a fact-finding mission be set up under the auspices of the Jirga. An inquiry committee be formed to probe the killing of Pashtuns on 12 May 2007 in Karachi;
8. An inquiry into the killings of Usman Kakar, Arif Wazir, Arman Loni, Asad Achakzai and other national martyrs be conducted by a credible judicial commission headed by Justice Qazi Faez Isa, and the report be made public;
9. The national right of the Pashtun people over all natural resources of the Pakhtunkhwa region be recognized. The provisions of the Pakistani constitution be implemented in real sense, and oil refineries be built in the Pakhtunkhwa province;
10. The Pakistani-built barbed barrier along the Durand Line be removed, and all historical trade routes on the line be ensured without any paperwork or documents for trade and free movement of the people living on both sides of the line;
11. The occupation of the forests, mountains, lands, natural resources, government buildings and non-government buildings in the Pakhtunkhwa region be ended immediately by the military and government agencies;
12. Land mines scattered in the Pashtun region be cleared;
13. Pashto be made the national, official and educational language of the Pakhtunkhwa region, and all mother tongues of the Pakhtunkhwa region be made mediums of instruction. The central government return the curriculum authority to the provinces under the Eighteenth Amendment, and the implementation of a Single National Curriculum be avoided at all costs;
14. Women's participation in political, economic and cultural affairs, as well as their participation in the enactment of laws and the prevention of negative traditional practices, be guaranteed;
15. An independent, transparent and inclusive mechanism be made for a new census in Pakistan in accordance with international norms, because the results of the 2017 Census were fake;
16. The Senate of Pakistan be given the same powers as the National Assembly in finance and other matters, and elections to the Senate be made by direct vote;
17. The Indus Water Apportionment Accord of 1991 be revised to grant the Pakhtunkhwa region a status of owner and stakeholder;
18. The Indus River be rerouted to its natural watercourse, because the diversion of the Indus from its original course under the pretext of the Ghazi-Barotha canal was unconstitutional and a clear transgression against universal principles;
19. Extrajudicial killings in fake encounters in the name of terrorism be stopped, missing persons be released, check posts in the Pakhtunkhwa region be abolished, and internally displaced persons be relocated to their areas and homes and be fully compensated for their losses;
20. The imposed declared and undeclared sanctions on political activities be lifted, and Ali Wazir, Hanif Pashteen, Owais Abdal, Qazi Tahir and all other political prisoners be immediately released;
21. The Chashma Lift Canal be immediately constructed;
22. The Pashto language, history, literature and arts be protected from the danger of extinction due to the 40 years of war and the colonial aggression, tyranny and occupation. The negative portrayal of the Pashtuns and Afghans through the anti-Pashtun state and private media be immediately stopped;
23. Tobacco be considered an agricultural crop like any other crop;
24. The draconian Khyber Pakhtunkhwa Action (in Aid of Civil Power) Regulation be immediately abolished, and all the safety, security and administrative powers be handed over to the civil administration;
25. The money owed by the federal government to the Pakhtunkhwa province in terms of electricity, water, natural gas and other resources be immediately paid.

==== Reactions ====
===== Afghan government =====
Former Afghan President Hamid Karzai praised the Bannu Jirga, calling it a positive beginning toward resolving issues in the region. He stated: "This jirga is an efficient step towards solving issues in Afghanistan and in the region and I support its statement. I also appreciate women’s participation in the jirga and the jirga’s call for securing women’s political, economic and cultural rights."

Former Afghan Vice President Amrullah Saleh and former Foreign Minister Haneef Atmar also supported the jirga. They said that the proposal that an elected and representative government be formed in Afghanistan through a loya jirga and general election was a bold and pleasant move.

===== Afghan United Front =====
The Afghanistan United Front led by Lieutenant General Sami Sadat praised the "calls for freedom and justice" by the Pashtun National Jirga and PTM, saying that "The people of Pashtunistan, like all others, deserve a better, more just life".

===== Pakistani government =====
Responding to the jirga's statement, Muhammad Ali Saif, Special Assistant to Chief Minister Khyber Pakhtunkhwa, categorically denied that Pashtuns were subjected to discrimination in Pakistan. He claimed that the Pakistan Army played no political role in the country's administrative affairs. In response to the demand for Ali Wazir's release, Saif stated that he could not be immediately released because there were "still cases pending in the courts against Ali Wazir."

=== Bacha Khan Markaz and Hashtnagar Jirgas ===
The Bannu Jirga endorsed the declarations of two earlier Pashtun Jirgas, one of which was organized on 10 March 2020 at Bacha Khan Markaz, Peshawar by Asfandyar Wali Khan of the Awami National Party (ANP), while the other was hosted on 7 August 2021 in Hashtnagar, Charsadda by Afzal Khamosh of the Mazdoor Kisan Party (MKP). These jirgas, both of which issued their 21-point declarations, were held to discuss the state of law and order, instability in the Pashtun region, natural resources, the trust gap between Pakistan and Afghanistan, and the reopening of trade routes between the two countries. The jirgas also discussed problems of the displaced and homeless people, blocked identity cards, censuses, land mines and missing persons.

=== All Pashtun Jirga in Islamabad ===
On 1 February 2018, when his Pashtun Long March that had started six days earlier at Dera Ismail Khan, reached Islamabad after passing through several cities of Khyber Pakhtunkhwa including Bannu, Peshawar and Swabi, Manzoor Pashteen organized a 10-day sit-in called "All Pashtun National Jirga" outside the National Press Club in Islamabad. It was during this jirga that the name of the "Mahsud Tahafuz Movement" (MTM) was changed to the "Pashtun Tahafuz Movement" (PTM). The jirga condemned the murder of the Pashtun labourer and aspiring model, Naqeebullah Mehsud, who was shot dead by police force in Karachi during an encounter, and the alleged state oppression against the Pashtuns. It asked the government to set up a judicial inquiry for Naqeebullah Mehsud, as well as for all the other Pashtuns murdered extrajudicially in police encounters. The jirga demanded to stop racial profiling of the Pashtuns in Pakistan, and to bring the Pashtun missing persons before the court of law, so that those who are innocent but held could be freed. The jirga also demanded Pakistan Army to guarantee that they would not abduct or open fire on innocents in the tribal areas, or use violence or collective punishment against entire villages and tribes, and that they would not impose the frequent curfews on the movement of locals after minor incidents. Another demand was to remove all land mines planted in the Pashtun tribal areas, which had resulted in many civilian casualties. The protesters said that since 2009, more than 35 people including children had been killed due to land mines in South Waziristan alone.

The sit-in in Islamabad ended on 10 February, but the organizers of the Pashtun Tahafuz Movement announced that they would reconvene the protest if their demands were not fulfilled by the government.

=== Afzal Khan Lala's Jirgas ===
In the 1990s, a similar series of Pashtun Jirgas was started by Afzal Khan Lala of Swat. The last of Afzal Khan Lala's Pashtun Jirgas was held in May 2012 at Nishtar Hall, Peshawar to campaign for the national unity of Pashtuns and protest the deaths of millions of Afghans in the war-battered Afghanistan.

== See also ==
- Pashtun nationalism
- Janikhel protest
