= Jirga =

Assembly of Pashtun tribal leaders

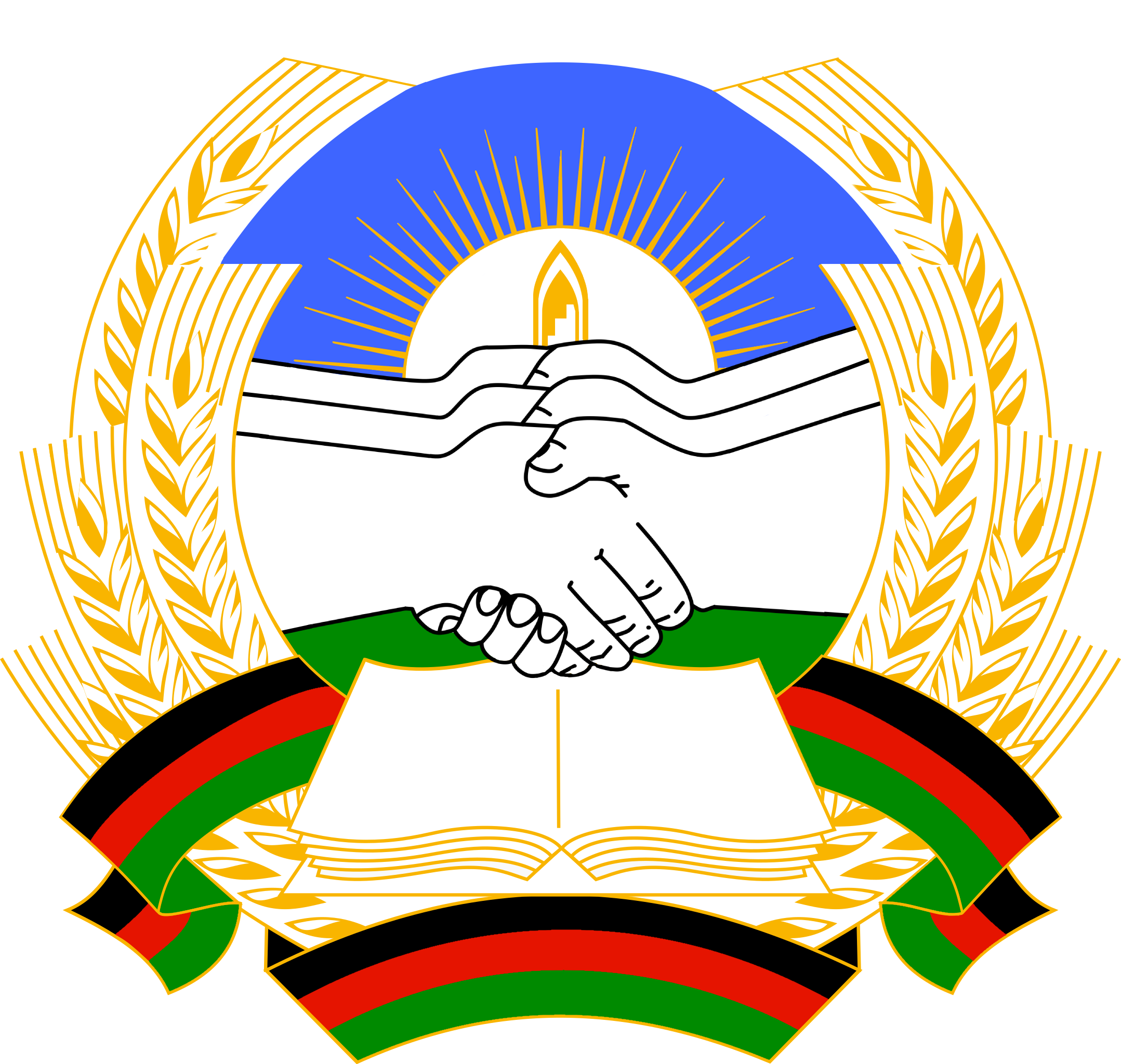
Emblem of Loya jirga 1980–1987

A jirga (Pashto: جرګه, jirga) is an assembly of leaders that makes decisions by consensus according to Pashtunwali, the Pashtun social code. It is conducted in order to settle disputes among the Pashtuns, but also by members of other ethnic groups who are influenced by them in present-day Afghanistan and Pakistan.

Historically, a loya jirga or a "great council" has been convened in order to elect a new head of state, approve a new constitution or resolve critical issues. Loya jirgas have reportedly been organized since the rise to power of the Hotak dynasty in the early 18th century. In July 1747, Pashtun chiefs assembled in Kandahar to elect a new king, choosing the 25-year-old Ahmad Shah Durrani, who is credited with founding the modern state of Afghanistan.

== Etymology ==
The term jirga is the simplified pronunciation for the term jorgai, itself being a more simplified form of the larger term jorgharai. It is the amalgamation of two Pashto words: "jor" (Pashto:جوړ) meaning "to fix" and the Pashto suffix "gai" (Pashto: ګای) meaning "assembly". The suffix "gai" is derived from the larger Pashto suffix "gharai" (Pashto:غړی) which means "member of". Amalgamated, the term "jirga" or "jorgai" or "jorgharai" would come to mean "an assembly to fix matters" or "member to an assembly for finding solutions".

In Pashto, a grand jirga is known as a "loya jirga" (لویه جرګه,) while a mini jirga is known as a "wara jirga" (وړه جرګه).

== Origin and historicity ==
The institution, which is centuries old, is a similar idea to the shura gathering ("consultative assembly").

It is thought that the ancient Indo-Iranian tribes, also known as Arya or Aryans, practiced a sort of jirga system with two types of councils – simite and sabhā. The simite (summit) comprised elders and tribal chiefs. The king also joined sessions of the simite. Sabhā was a sort of rural council. In present-day India, they are still referred to as Samiti and Sabha.

In Afghan society, the jirga is still maintained and favored, mostly by tribal leaders to solve internal or external disputes with other tribes. In some cases it functions like a town hall meeting. When the Afghans took power they tried to legitimize their hold with such a jirga. While in the beginning only Pashtuns were allowed to participate in the jirgas, later other ethnic groups like Tajiks and Hazaras were allowed to participate as well. The member of the jirgas were mostly members of the royal family, religious leaders and tribal leaders of the Afghans. King Amanullah Khan institutionalized the jirga. From Amanullah until the reign of Mohammed Zahir Shah (1933–1973) and Mohammed Daoud Khan (1973–1978) the jirga was recognized as a common meeting of regional Pashtun leaders. The meetings do not have scheduled occurrences, but rather are called for when issues or disputes arise. There is no time limit for a jirga to conclude, and the meetings often take time because decisions can only be made as a group and arguments can drag out for days. Various issues can be addressed such as major disaster, foreign policy, declaration of war, the legitimacy of leaders, and the introduction of new ideas and laws.

== Functioning methodology ==
The community council meaning is often found in circumstances involving a dispute between two individuals; a jirga may be part of the dispute resolution mechanism in such cases. The disputants would usually begin by finding a mediator, choosing someone such as a senior religious leader, a local notable, or a mediation specialist (a khan or məshər). In tribal Pashtun society, the maliks serve as de facto arbiters in local conflicts, interlocutors in state policy-making, tax-collectors, heads of village and town councils and delegates to provincial and national jirgas as well as delegates to Parliament. The mediator hears from each of the two sides and then he forms a Jirga of community elders, taking care to include the supporters of both sides. The jirga then considers the case and, after it discusses the matter, it comes to a decision about how to handle it, which the mediator then announces. The jirga's conclusion is binding.

== Afghanistan ==
A loya jirga was gathered by Mirwais Hotak in Shari Safa near Kandahar in 1709.

A 1747 jirga at Kandahar was attended by Afghan representatives who appointed Ahmad Shah Durrani as their new leader.

In September 1928, a jirga was called by King Amanullah Khan at Paghman near Kabul, the third loya jirga of his reign (1919–1929) to discuss reforms, during which King Amanullah asked Queen Soraya to remove her veil in order to gain support for his modernizing policies. However, this was too much for the delegates, some of whom instigated a revolt. Resistance against Amanullah's reforms eventually led to the Afghan Civil War (1928–1929).

=== 2002 loya jirga ===
In June–July 2002, Hamid Karzai elected to oversee a loya jirga. This was only possible because in the fall of 2001, Karzai was able to successfully lead one of the largest tribes in southern Afghanistan in a revolt against the rule of the Taliban. The loya jirga was organized by the interim administration of Hamid Karzai, with about 1,600 delegates, some of the delegates were selected during elections which were held in various regions of the country, and other delegates were selected by members of various political, cultural, and religious groups. It was held in a large tent on the grounds of the Kabul Polytechnic on June 11 and it was scheduled to last about a week. It formed a new Transitional Administration that took office shortly thereafter.

More than 1,000 of the participants were elected in a two-stage procedure. Each district elected 20 members, who then elected one person who would represent the entire district in a secret vote. At least one member was allocated to each of the country's 362 districts, with an additional seat being allocated for every 22,000 people. No one was barred from the meeting with the exception of people who were accused of engaging in terrorism, people who were suspected of being involved in the illegal drug trade, people who committed human rights abuses, people who committed war crimes, people who committed pillage, and people who committed theft of public property. Additionally, nomads, refugees, intellectuals, representatives of cultural institutions, representatives of social organizations, and religious scholars were all in attendance. Of the remaining seats, a total of 160 seats were allocated to women.

=== 2003 loya jirga ===
On 14 December 2003, a 502-delegate loya jirga was convened in Kabul to consider the proposed Afghan Constitution. Originally planned to last ten days, the assembly endorsed the charter by January 4, 2004.

=== 2022 loya jirga ===
From 29 June to 2 July 2022, the Taliban government hosted the first loya jirga since its takeover at the Loya Jirga Hall in Kabul. Around 3,500 people attended, including scholars, tribal elders, non-Taliban local leaders, representatives of the Shiite community, and representatives of Afghan refugees in Iran and Pakistan. No female delegates were present. The jirga produced an 11-point resolution, which reiterated the country's sovereignty, and implored the international community to recognize the Taliban government.

=== Other historical jirgas ===
Some other historical jirgas in the history of Afghanistan are:

- September 1930 – A jirga of 286 called by Mohammed Nadir Shah to confirm his accession to the throne.
- 1941 – Called by Mohammed Zahir Shah to approve neutrality in World War II.
- July 26, 1949 – Afghanistan-Pakistan relations rapidly deteriorated over a dispute, officially declared that it did not recognize the 1893 Durand Line border any longer between the two countries.
- September 1964 – A meeting of 452 called by Mohammed Zahir Shah to approve a new constitution.
- July 1974 – A meeting with Pakistan over the Durand Line.
- January 1977 – Approved the new constitution of Mohammed Daoud Khan establishing one-party rule in the Republic of Afghanistan.
- April 1985 – To ratify the new constitution of the Democratic Republic of Afghanistan.
- May 1990 – To ratify a new constitution of the Republic of Afghanistan under Mohammad Najibullah, amendments includes providing for multiple political parties.
- September 2001 – Four different loya jirga movements anticipating the end of Taliban rule. Little communication took place between each of them.
  - The first was based in Rome around Mohammed Zahir Shah, and it reflected the interests of moderate Pashtuns from Afghanistan. The Rome initiative called for fair elections, support for Islam as the foundation of the Afghan state, and respect for human rights.
  - The second was based in Cyprus and led by Homayoun Jarir, a member of the Islamic Party of his father-in-law, Gulbuddin Hekmatyar. Critics of the Cyprus initiative suspected that it served the interests of Iran. The members of the Cyprus initiative, however, considered themselves closer to the Afghan people and regard the Rome group as too close to the long-isolated nobility.
  - The most significant was based in Germany, which resulted in the Bonn Agreement (Afghanistan). This agreement was made under United Nations auspices, established the Afghan Interim Authority and paved the way for the later jirgas that established the Constitution of Afghanistan.
- 2006 – Afghan president Hamid Karzai said that he and the Pakistani president will jointly lead a loya jirga to end a dispute over border attacks.
- December 2009 – after his disputed re-election, President Hamid Karzai announced to move ahead with a plan for a loya jirga to discuss the Taliban insurgency. The Taliban was invited to take part in this jirga, but they declined.
- June 2010 – at Kabul, in which around 1,600 delegates of all ethnic groups attended for a peace talks with the Taliban.
- 17 November 2013 – at Kabul, in which around 2,500 Afghan elders approved the presence of a limited number of US forces beyond 2014.
- April 29 – May 3, 2019 – at the Bagh-e Bala Palace in Kabul, held to agree a common approach to peace talks with the Taliban, amid negotiations between the Taliban and the United States. The jirga was chaired by Abdul Rasul Sayyaf and over 3,200 delegates attended. The Taliban refused to attend.
- 7–9 August 2020 – held to decide the fate of 400 Taliban prisoners accused of serious crimes, who were supposed to be freed as part of the Afghan peace process.

== Pakistan ==
=== 1947 Bannu jirga ===
On June 21, 1947, in Bannu, a loya jirga was held consisting of Bacha Khan, his brother Chief Minister Dr Khan Sahib, the Khudai Khidmatgars, members of the Provincial Assembly, Mirzali Khan (Faqir of Ipi), and other tribal chiefs, just seven weeks before the Partition of India. The loya jirga declared the Bannu Resolution, which demanded that the Pashtuns be given a choice to have an independent state of Pashtunistan composing all Pashtun territories of British India, instead of being made to join either India or Pakistan. However, the British Raj refused to comply with the demand of this resolution, in response to which the Khudai Khidmatgars boycotted the 1947 North-West Frontier Province referendum for merging the province into Pakistan.

=== 2006 loya jirga for Balochistan ===
In April 2006, former Balochistan Chief Minister Taj Muhammad Jamali offered to arrange a meeting between President Pervez Musharraf and a loya jirga for peace in Balochistan. A loya jirga was held at Kalat in September 2006 to announce that a case would be filed in the International Court of Justice regarding the sovereignty and rights of the Baloch people.

=== Quasi-legal function ===
The jirga was also used as a court in cases of criminal conduct, but this usage is being replaced by formal courts in some settled areas of Pakistan and Afghanistan, elsewhere it is still used as courts in tribal regions.

The jirga holds the prestige of a court in the tribal areas of Pakistan. Although a political agent appointed by the national government maintains law and order through the Frontier Crimes Regulation (FCR), the actual power lies in the jirga. The political agent maintains law and order in his tribal region with the help of jirgas. The jirga can award capital punishment, such as stoning to death in case of adultery, or expulsion from the community.

In the recent military operations against al Qaeda and the Taliban in Pakistan's restive southern tribal agencies bordering Afghanistan, jirgas played a key role of moderator between the government and the militants. The tradition of jirga has also been adopted by Muslims in the Kashmir Valley of Indian-administered Kashmir.

=== Alternative Dispute Resolution Act 2017 ===
As per 2017 political dispensation in Government, unofficial Jirga and Panchayats are very popular among masses, so formal recognition of the same will help make the system more transparent and responsible, while left leaning political dispensations in opposition expressed their apprehension that weaker sections will suffer while feudalism will benefit. The Alternative Dispute Resolution Act, 2017 of Pakistan makes provision for selection of neutral observing arbitrator from Government approved panel agreed by parties. If a dispute is resolved amicably the court will formalize judgement, and if not parties can choose to opt-in further formal judicial administration for their grievances. Basit Mahmood criticizes the bill's provisions allowing the government to appoint "neutrals" to each jirga not being sufficient since the so-called "neutrals", who must approve their verdicts would most likely be consisting of retired judges and religious scholars of conservative nature and that will put principle of neutrality upside down and with a substantially effect on the lives of women across the Pakistan. Basit Mahmood also criticizes United Kingdom's donor agency Department for International Development for funding of misogyny protecting ADR tribunals.

=== Contested justice and human rights violations ===
In a January 2019 on petition from National Commission on the Status of Women (NCSW) judgement Supreme Court of Pakistan ruled that, beyond permissible limits of the law to the extent of acting as arbitration, mediation, negotiation or reconciliation forums between parties involved in a civil dispute who willingly consent to the same; rest of practices and attempts by Jirgas to adjudicate on civil or criminal matters is not lawful, and that unlawful practices of Jirgas are violate Articles 4, 8, 10-A, 25 and 175(3) of the Constitution of Pakistan, and also that "operation of jirgas/ panchayats, etc violates Pakistan's international commitments under the UDHR, ICCPR and CEDAW, which place a responsibility on the state of Pakistan to ensure that everyone has access to courts or tribunals, (and all people) are treated equally before the law and in all stages of procedure in courts and tribunals".

According to correspondent I.A. Rehman, In January 2019 Pakistani government law officials from provinces and federal confirmed governments-made commitments to Supreme Court of Pakistan not to allow Panchayat and Jirga platforms for illegal practices of violating fundamental constitutional rights of women by honour killings, wani, swara, karo kari, and that the governments are committed to CEDAW

=== Instances of jirga judicial overreach ===
In January 2018, Basit Mahmood criticized 2017 Pakistan act for Alternative Dispute Resolution saying that it creates scope for a parallel justice system which eventually can undermine states' authority. As per Dilawar Wazir's June 2020 news report in Pakistani news daily Dawn and subsequent editorial, district administration in Pakistan's tribal area was struggling to see one Ahmadzai Wazir tribe avoids to implement its jirga ruling of raising a parallel armed force (lashkar) of around 2,400 people to demolish houses of left-leaning political opponents. To make the tribal jirga to submit to a financial compromise, the district administration had to call in elite security force, and make victim submit to demand of 1 million rupees plus four rams as reparation from victim and his clan.

As per a June 2020 Tribune Pakistan report, a jirga (a type of quasi kangaroo court) attempted ruling to give up a 13-year-old minor girl in marriage to a 41-year-old married man as Swara (punishment) for her brother's alleged disliked relation with his cousin, the Jirga's attempt was foiled by a close relative of the boy with help of police.

In another 2020 June incident in Sindh Pakistan, police struggled to clamp down on a jirga which declared two sisters to be ignoble 'Karis' fined father of the girls for one million rupees plus ordered killing of the sisters (an outlawed but prevalent practice of declaring 'Kari's-literal black spot on honour of the family or community – subjectable to severe punishments including honour killing many times for alleged compromising on expectations of modesty and chastity out of suspicions).

=== Historic jirgas and women ===
The Sindh High Court imposed a ban on the holding of jirgas in April 2004 because of the sometimes inhumane sentences which were imposed on people, especially on women and men who married of their own free will. The ban, however, has been ignored.

An all-female jirga or a Khwaindo jirga (a "sister's council") was held in Pakistan, and it had a total of 25 members. It was headed by Tabassum Adnan which helped 11 women get justice as of 2013.

=== 2022 Pashtun National Jirga ===
On 11–14 March 2022, the Pashtun National Jirga, or Bannu Jirga, was held at Mirakhel in Bannu, Khyber Pakhtunkhwa in order to defend the rights of the Pashtuns in the country. The critical issues which were faced by the Pashtuns were discussed during the jirga in a bid to suggest solutions to them. The Bannu Jirga endorsed the declarations of two earlier Pashtun Jirgas, one of which was organized on 10 March 2020 at Bacha Khan Markaz, Peshawar by Asfandyar Wali Khan of the Awami National Party (ANP), while the other was hosted on 7 August 2021 in Hashtnagar, Charsadda by Afzal Khamosh of the Mazdoor Kisan Party (MKP).

Mahmood Khan Achakzai, Nawab Ayaz Jogezai, Abdul Rahim Ziaratwal, Abdul Qahar Wadan, Obaidullah Babat, Nasrullah Zayrai and Arfa Siddiq of the Pashtunkhwa Milli Awami Party (PMAP), Manzoor Pashteen, Mir Kalam and Wranga Loni of the Pashtun Tahafuz Movement (PTM), Mohsin Dawar, Latif Afridi, Afrasiab Khattak, Bushra Gohar and Jamila Gilani of the National Democratic Movement (NDM), Khadim Hussain and Maulana Khanzeb of the Awami National Party (ANP), Afzal Khamosh of the Mazdoor Kisan Party (MKP), Farhatullah Babar and Ahmad Kundi of the Pakistan Peoples Party (PPP), Sardar Yaqoob Nasar of the Pakistan Muslim League (PMLN), Muhammad Khan Sherani of Jamiat Ulema-e-Islam (JUI), Chief of Waziristan Gul Alam Wazir, historian Parvesh Shaheen, and numerous other Pashtun, Baloch and Hazara leaders were part of the Bannu Jirga. The resolutions were also endorsed by several Afghan political leaders, including Hamid Karzai, Haneef Atmar and Amrullah Saleh.

== See also ==
- Wolesi Jirga ("People's Jirga"), the lower house of the Afghan legislature
- Meshrano Jirga ("Elders' Jirga"), the upper house of the Afghan legislature
- All India Pakhtoon Jirga-e-Hind
- Afghan Peace Jirga 2010
- Nanawatai (nanawate), meaning "sanctuary"
- Shura, the Arabic and Tajik equivalent of jirga
- Panchayat, North Indian equivalent of jirga
  - Khap, the (mainly Jat) extrajudicial form of Panchayats
- Kurultai, the Turkic and Mongol equivalent of a jirga
  - Kurultáj, the Kurultai of the Huns and Hungarians
