= Noor Islam Dawar =

Pashtun human rights activist (died 2021)

- نور اسلام داوړ
- Born: Mulagan, Mirali, North Waziristan, Khyber Pakhtunkhwa, Pakistan
- Died: August 27, 2021; Mirali, North Waziristan, Khyber Pakhtunkhwa, Pakistan
- Cause of death: Gunshot wounds
- Occupation: Human rights activist
- Organization: Youth of Waziristan
- Movement: Pashtun Tahafuz Movement
- Children: 5

Noor Islam Dawar (Pashto: نور اسلام داوړ; Urdu: نور اسلام داوڑ; died in 2021) was a Pashtun human rights activist from North Waziristan, Khyber Pakhtunkhwa, Pakistan. He was an activist in the Pashtun Tahafuz Movement (PTM), as well as the chairman of a civil society organization, Youth of Waziristan (YOW).

On 27 August 2021, when Noor Islam was on his way home from Mirali Bazaar, he was assassinated in a targeted killing. Soon after, several other YOW activists were also murdered in North Waziristan, including Mussawer Dawar on 22 March 2022, and Waqar Ahmad Dawar, Hemad Durrani, Asadullah Shah, and Sunaid Ahmad Dawar on 19 June 2022. The police registered first information reports (FIRs) against "unknown" assailants.

== Political activism ==
Following the Pakistan Armed Forces' Operation Zarb-e-Azb against militants in June 2014, which forced many residents of North Waziristan to flee their homes and settle at IDP camps in Bannu and other districts, Noor Islam campaigned for the return of the refugees to their homes and organized several protest gatherings against human rights violations in the region. He founded the Youth of Waziristan (YOW), an organization that protests against insecurity, targeted killings, and lack of basic amenities in Waziristan.

During one of the protest sit-ins at Mirali Chowk (now known as Shaheed Noor Islam Chowk after himself), Noor Islam and his friends were picked up by the Pakistani security agencies for a few days, and were forced to end the protest. After he was released, he was found to have several torture marks on his body and multiple fractures to his head.

He was also an activist in the Pashtun Tahafuz Movement (PTM), and participated in its protests and gatherings.

== Assassination ==
On the evening of 27 August 2021 at around 6 p.m. (PST, UTC+05:00), when he was on his way home from Mirali Bazaar, Noor Islam was attacked by gunmen in the Inzerabad area of Hasukhel, Mirali in North Waziristan. He was shot four times, after which he was rushed to Mirali Hospital for emergency treatment, where he succumbed to his wounds.

The gunmen, who were riding a Fielder car and a motorcycle, escaped the site after the attack.

=== Responsibility ===
No one claimed responsibility for the murder, nor did the government charge or arrest anyone. The North Waziristan police chief, Shafiullah Gandapur, said that a case had been registered against "unknown individuals" and that an investigation about the targeted killing was under way.

=== Funeral ===
His funeral was held at his native village, Mulagan, on 28 August 2021.

=== Reactions ===
The murder caused widespread panic among the locals, who demanded the government of Pakistan improve the law and order situation in the area. On 30 August, the Pashtun Tahafuz Movement and members of the Youth of Waziristan protested against the killing in Mirali, and demanded the government to punish the murderers. Manzoor Pashteen, the leader of PTM, told the protest rally that they wanted peace but their comrades were being killed because of it. Mohsin Dawar, another leader of PTM and the chairman of the National Democratic Movement, said that "Noor Islam was the first person to protest against targeted killings in the area, but unfortunately he was himself killed." In an opinion article for The Diplomat, Mohsin wrote that Noor Islam became "the first active political worker with a profile to match to be killed in a targeted attack since Operation Zarb-e-Azb, the 2014 government military offensive against militant outfits."

== Assassinations of other YOW activists ==
On 22 March 2022, Mussawer Dawar, who was the spokesperson of the Youth of Waziristan (YOW) and a candidate of the Awami National Party (ANP) for a general council seat in the local body election in Haider Khel, Mirali Tehsil, was killed by gunmen who were riding a motorcycle outside his office in Mirali Bazaar. The attackers escaped after the murder.

On 19 June 2022, Waqar Ahmad Dawar, who was the general secretary of the YOW and a schoolteacher, and three other YOW activists – Hemad Durrani (the senior vice president of the YOW and a Rescue 1122 employee), Asadullah Shah (a government servant in the health department and district president of Alkhidmat Foundation), and Sunaid Ahmad Dawar (a university student and worker of the National Democratic Movement) – were sprayed with bullets when gunmen on two motorcycles attacked their moving car in Haider Khel. The incident took place in the afternoon when the four friends were returning to their homes after having lunch with their friend in Haider Khel. All four victims were rushed to the nearby hospital in Mirali where they were pronounced dead on arrival. The gunmen escaped after the shooting, and no one claimed responsibility for the attack.

Jahanzeb Khan, deputy superintendent of police (DSP) in Mirali, told the BBC that "the four companions were riding in a car when suddenly the attackers on motorcycles came and opened fire on the car from both sides." When asked if the Pakistani Taliban (Tehrik-i-Taliban Pakistan, or TTP) were behind the attack, Jahanzeb Khan said other extremist organizations were more likely to be involved.

The National Democratic Movement (NDM), the Awami National Party (ANP), Jamaat-e-Islami (JI), and other political parties protested against the murders in different parts of Khyber Pakhtunkhwa, including North Waziristan, Peshawar, Charsadda, Swabi, Bannu, and Lakki Marwat, as well as in Balochistan, Sindh, and Punjab. During a protest rally by the Pashtun Tahafuz Movement (PTM) in Islamabad, Manzoor Pashteen said the Pakistani media was covering Rao Anwar and Ehsanullah Ehsan, but no media covered the four slain youths. Pashteen lamented that no Pakistani court or judge questioned the killing of these educated peace activists.

== See also ==
- Mohsin Dawar
- Tahir Dawar
- Arif Wazir
- Killing of Naqeebullah Mehsud
- Alamzaib Mahsud
- Arman Loni
- Abdullah Nangyal
- Gulalai Ismail
