= Fazal Khan =

Advocate Fazal Khan
- Occupation(s): Lawyer, human rights activist
- Known for: Army Public School Peshawar Shuhada (Martyrs) Forum, Sahibzada Umar Khan Shaheed Welfare Hospital
- Movement: Pashtun Tahafuz Movement
- Children: Sahibzada Umar Khan (son)

Fazal Khan Advocate (Pashto: فضل خان) is a lawyer, human rights activist, and a leader of the Pashtun Tahafuz Movement (PTM). He is also the president of the Army Public School Peshawar Shuhada (Martyrs) Forum. He has set up Sahibzada Umar Khan Shaheed Welfare Hospital in Peshawar in memory of his late son who was killed in the 2014 Peshawar school massacre, to provide free health services to deserving people.

On 21 July 2020, Fazal Khan survived an assassination attempt by two motorcyclists, who opened fire on him as he was driving back to home from the Peshawar High Court.

== Social activism ==
Fazal Khan is an active member of the Pashtun Tahafuz Movement (PTM). He was a representative of the PTM team holding talks with the Pakistani government.

== Peshawar school massacre case ==
On 16 December 2014, Fazal Khan lost his eldest son, 14-year-old Sahibzada Umar Khan, in the Army Public School Peshawar massacre, during which armed gunmen killed 149 people at the school, including 132 schoolchildren. Umar Khan died as he was shot with four bullets on his chest and hands. The Fazlullah-led Tehrik-i-Taliban Pakistan (TTP) claimed responsibility for the attack. In 2017, when Ehsanullah Ehsan, the former spokesman of the Taliban, was arrested by the authorities, Fazal Khan launched a court case against him and claimed that the Pakistani government was planning to grant clemency to Ehsan. However, Ehsan had already left the TTP before the school massacre to co-found the ISIL-KP (Daesh)-linked Jamaat-ul-Ahrar in August 2014, which was reported to have condemned the TTP attack on APS school in Peshawar. Ehsan left as he had developed ideological differences with the TTP leadership following the appointment of Fazlullah as the leader of the TTP. In December 2017, the Peshawar High Court ruled that the authorities should not release Ehsan and wait until the court trial. However, in February 2020, Ehsan released an audio message, claiming to have fled from Pakistan to Turkey in the previous month. On 12 February 2020, families of the martyrs, led by Fazal Khan, protested outside the Peshawar Press Club against the reported release of Ehsan and demanded to launch an investigation into the incident. "How can a terrorist escape from a highly-guarded red zone area? It is a good joke," said Fazal Khan. The parents of the victims demanded to know about the whereabouts of Ehsan as they had been waiting for justice for over five years.

In response to the failure of the government in preventing Ehsan's release, Fazal Khan launched another court case against Pakistani government and military officials, including the Army Chief and the Director-General of ISI. "Despite clear-cut directions of this honorable court, now it has come to light that a luxurious home was provided to Ehsan from which the terrorist has made his escape: a fact not denied by the respondents [government officials]," wrote Fazal Khan in his petition. "Unfortunately, the demeanour of the respondents in bringing the culprits to justice is well highlighted by the fact that not a single step has been taken by the respondents to bring the culprits to justice. The respondents through their inaction and omission have categorically flouted the orders of this court," added the petition. On 27 February 2020, the Peshawar High Court asked the government and military officials named in the petition to respond to it within 14 days.

== See also ==
- Manzoor Pashteen
- Said Alam
- Killing of Naqeebullah Mehsud
- Tahir Dawar
- Arman Loni
- Abdullah Nangyal
- Gulalai Ismail
