= National Youth Organisation (Pakistan) =

Pakistani political youth organisation

National Youth Organisation Pashto: د ځوانانو ملي تنظیم Urdu: نیشنل یوتھ آرگنائزیشن
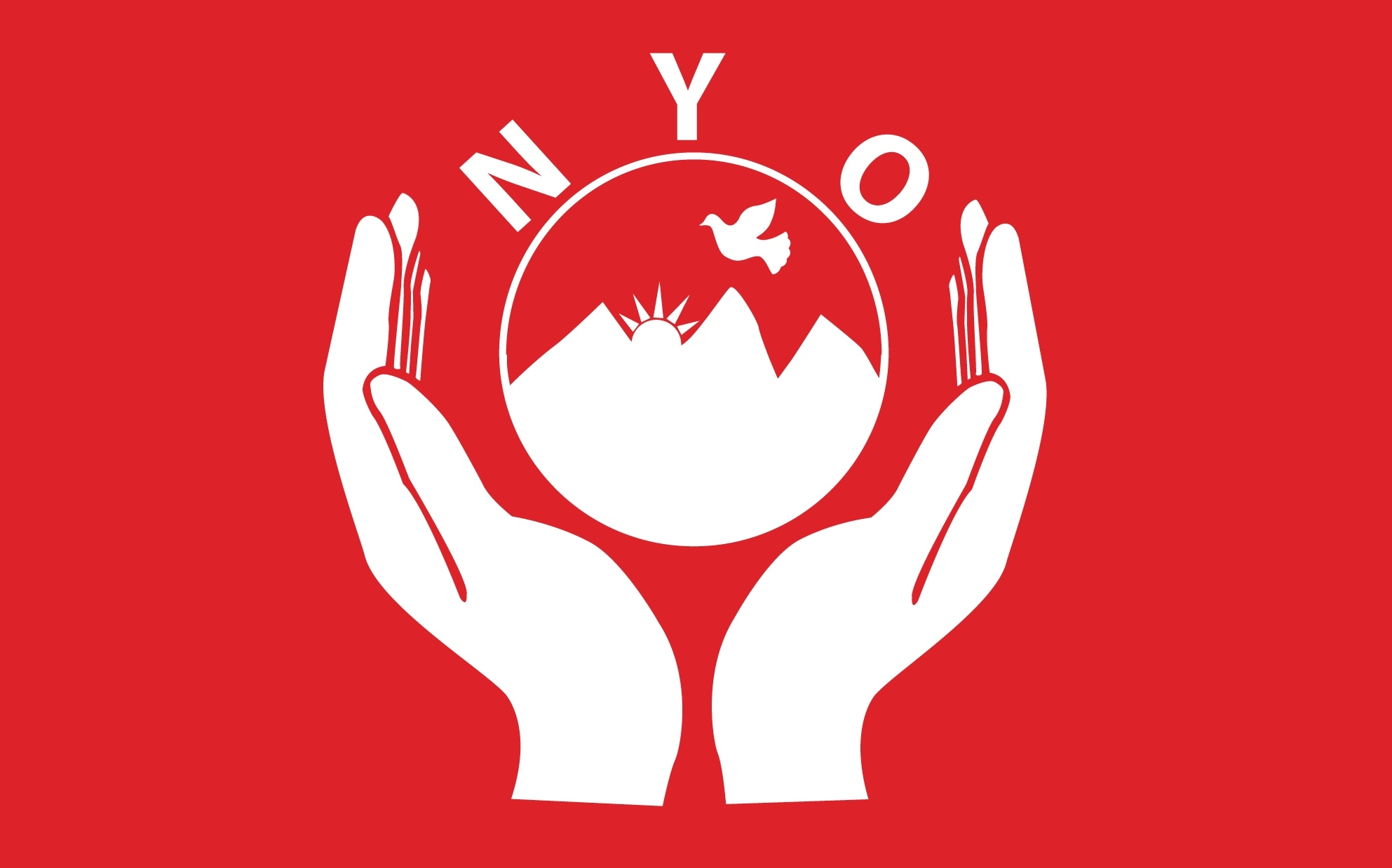
- Founder: Asfandyar Wali Khan
- Founded: 1 June 2013
- Headquarters: Bacha Khan Markaz; Peshawar, Pakistan
- Ideology: Secularism; Democratic socialism Economic egalitarianism Civil libertarianism Pashtun nationalism
- Political position: Center-left to left-wing
- Mother Party: Awami National Party
- Colors: Red

Website
- www.nyoanp.org

The National Youth Organisation (Pashto: د ځوانانو ملي تنظیم; Urdu: نیشنل یوتھ آرگنائزیشن; Acronym: NYO) serves as the youth wing of the Awami National Party. It was founded by Asfandyar Wali Khan in 2013, with its inauguration meeting on 1 June of that year. During this meeting, the participants were appointed as the core committee and central advisory body responsible for drafting the organisation's constitution and manifesto. The current President, Khushal Khan son of Afrasiab Khattak, was elected by the Central Council on 7 June 2014 for a two-year term.

== History ==
Khan Abdul Ghaffar Khan (Bacha Khan) started his movement from youth. He first founded an organisation by the name Youth League in 1922. Later, he went to forming the famous Khudai Khidmatgar movement. A large number of Khudai Khidmatgars were in their twenties and thirties, He realized that youth of the nation are the driving force behind and movement. Zalmai Pakhtun of which Khan Abdul Ghani Khan was a commander was also part of Bacha Khan's movement and had played a significant role in the struggle for rights, on the same footsteps, the leader of Awami National Party Asfandyar Wali Khan founded National Youth Organisation, popularly known by its acronym NYO.

=== Manifesto ===
Aims and Objectives National Youth Organisation shall:

- Strive to develop a free democratic society based on pluralism and respect for diversity free from the menace of extremism, sectarianism and terrorism
- Through effective affirmative action seek abolishing gender discrimination and empower the disenfranchised female strata of the youth through allocation of special quota in all matters of the political and organisational life of the NYO and lobby for enhanced woman role in every walk of life.
- Make every endeavor to inculcate and put to practice within its cadres and in the society, the teachings and political ideals of the Fakhr e Afghan Khan Abdul Ghaffar Khan with demonstrable commitment to the political philosophy of non-violence
- Remain committed to service of people and continue the social reformatory process the great Bacha Khan envisioned
- Make every effort for grooming its members and cadres for an ideal leadership role with strong character, clear political vision and serious commitment to the political ideals of Awami National Party
- Seek formulation of policies beneficial to the youth in education, health and employment sectors
- Ensure a strong ideological base for the Awami National Party in young generation of society through emphasis on independent and democratically formulated foreign relations with neighboring states and respect for the sovereignty and independence of all nations
- Develop space and resources for healthy and recreational activities for the youth, and do every necessary for the promotion and preservation of diverse cultures and languages within the country.
- Disseminate and promote inter-faith harmony and respect for all religious faiths professed by diverse segments of society.
- Helps the young generation to join the politics if they want to.
- Will support the youth and will give them their social rights.

== China–Pakistan Economic Corridor ==
National Youth Organisation NYO has played a central role in raising the issue of China–Pakistan Economic Corridor on all forums, rallies have been taken out throughout Khyber Pakhtunkhwa and Balochistan against the change in a route that was to pass through Dera Ismail Khan, Zhob, and Quetta. National Youth Organization called first-ever All Parties Conference on the issue on 17 February 2015 with the approval from the parent party Awami National Party in Islamabad, which was participated by major political leaders including Party President Asfandyar Wali Khan, Opposition Leader Syed Khursheed Shah, Shah Mehmood Qureshi Vice Chairman of Pakistan Tehreek-e-Insaaf, Maulana Atta-ur-Rehman and Maulana Sherani of JUI-F, Hasil Bizenjo President National Party, Aftab Ahmad Khan Sherpao Chairman Qaumi Wattan Party. The All Parties Conference was chaired by the Central President of National Youth Organization Khushal Khan Khattak, a presentation on the subject was delivered by its Senior Vice President and Chair of Research and Action Committee China Pakistan Economic Corridor Sulaiman Mandanr. The All Parties Conference acted as a launchpad for the movement against change in route. It was followed by protests, rallies, and public gatherings in different cities of the country. The Awami National Party Balochistan Chapter along with National Youth Organization Balochistan Chapter organized a large public gathering in Quetta followed by a shutter down strike and another All Parties Conference. This pressurized the Federal Government to call an All Parties Conference in which all participating parties agreed on the building of the western route on priority. While the issue is still being discussed insufficient funds allocated to the western route have raised concerns about over-commitment by the Federal Government and Prime Minister Nawaz Sharif. Awami National Party Parliamentary leader in the Senate with help of National Youth Organisation research committee prepared proposals for amendment in the proposed budget and while chairing the Senate of Pakistan Finance Committee rejected the allocations of funds for Western Corridor and asked the Federal Government to allocate at least 100 billion for the route. The Federal Government has held talks with Awami National Party leadership which were also participated by National Youth Organization Central Leadership before the APC and after the pre-budget announcement of PSDP. National Youth Organisation continues to play an important role on the issue.

== Prominent leaders ==
- Asfandyar Wali Khan
- Mohsin Dawar

== See also ==
- List of political parties in Pakistan
- Kalabagh Dam
- Khan Abdul Jabbar Khan
- Bahram Khan family
- Awami National Party
