= Mohsin Dawar =

Pakistani politician (born 1984)

- محسن داوڑ محسن داوړ
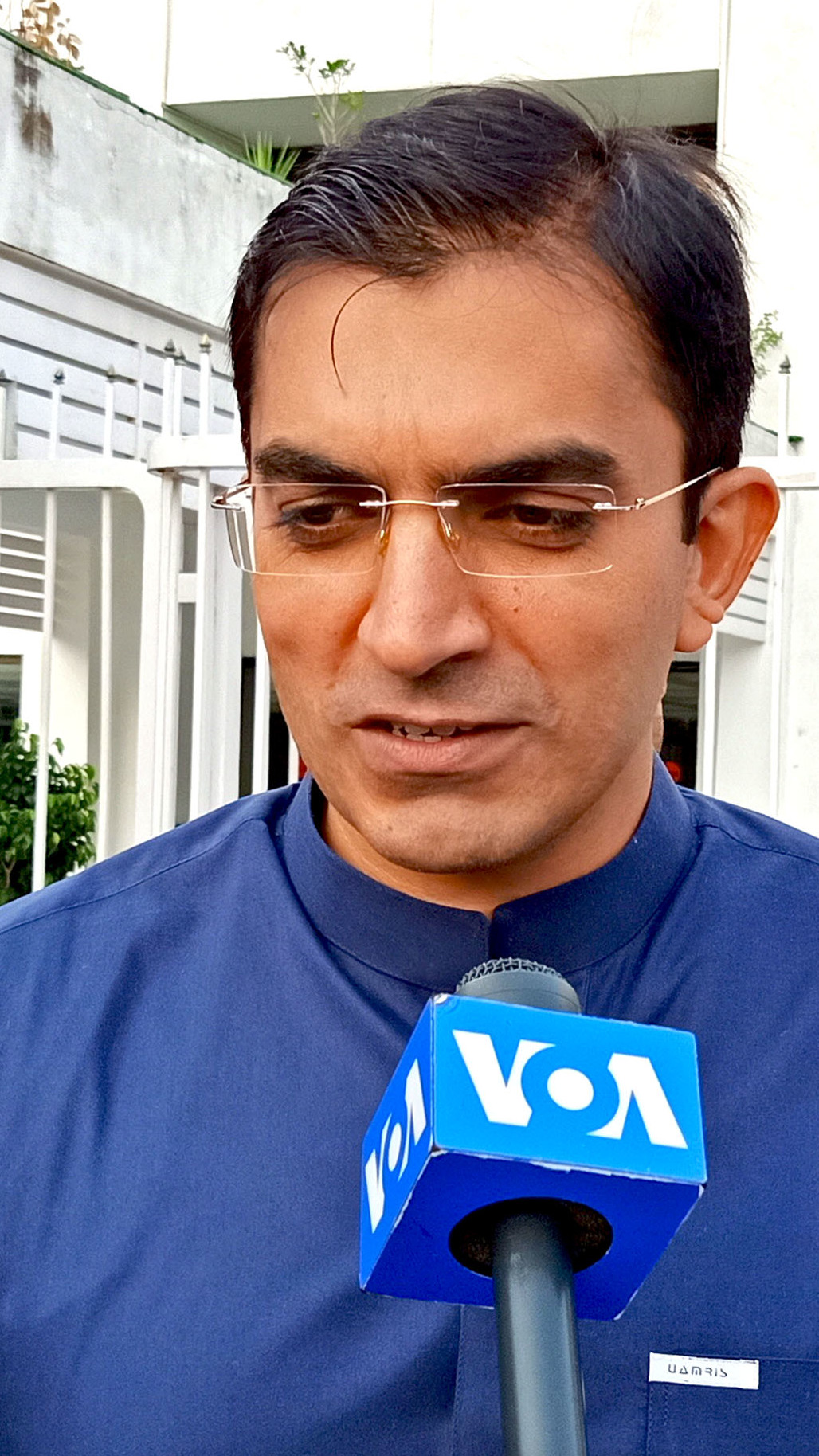
- Dawar in an interview with the VOA Urdu

President of National Democratic Movement
- Incumbent
- Assumed office 1 September 2021
- President: Mohsin Dawar
- Preceded by: Position Established

Member of the National Assembly
- In office 13 August 2018 – 10 August 2023
- Constituency: NA-48 (Tribal Area-IX)

Personal details
- Born: 25 November 1984 (age 41) Miranshah, North Waziristan, Khyber Pakhtunkhwa, Pakistan
- Party: National Democratic Movement (2021–present)
- Parent: Javed Iqbal (father)
- Education: Gomal University

Mohsin Dawar (Note: Pashto: محسن داوړ) (born 25 November 1984) is a Pakistani politician who is the founder and President of the National Democratic Movement (NDM) since 2021. Regarded as one of Pakistan's most prominent Pashtun nationalists, he is also a co-founder of the Pashtun Tahafuz Movement (PTM).

Dawar was born and raised in Miranshah, North-West Frontier Province and graduated from Gomal University, Dera Ismail Khan. While studying there, he developed interest in regional politics and founded the Pashtun Students Federation (PSF), an allied student wing of the Awami National Party (ANP). Dawar later co-founded the ANP's youth wing National Youth Organisation (NYO) and staunchly opposed Pakistan Army's offensives, as well as the Afghan Taliban and Pakistani Taliban, in the war in Khyber Pakhtunkhwa. These events prompted him to co-found the PTM in February 2018, along with Manzoor Pashteen, Ali Wazir and other Pashtun activists. Dawar's criticism of the Pakistani establishment led to his suspension from the ANP in March 2018. He contested and won his seat in the 2018 election and served as a member of the National Assembly from 2018 to 2023. In February 2024, Dawar was wounded at a political gathering Miranshah after being the target of an assassination attempt.

== Early life and family ==
Mohsin Dawar was born on 25 November 1984 in Miranshah, North Waziristan, North-West Frontier Province, Pakistan. His family belongs to the Dawar clan of the Karlani tribal confederation of Pashtuns. His great-grandfather was a close aide to the Pashtun leader Abdul Ghaffar Khan and one of the supporters of the Khudai Khidmatgar movement against the British Raj.

== Political career ==
While attending the Gomal University, Mohsin Dawar was the president of the Pashtun Students Federation (PSF), an allied student wing of the Awami National Party (ANP). Dawar also co-founded the ANP's youth wing, the National Youth Organisation (NYO). In the wake of Operation Zarb-e-Azb by the Pakistan Armed Forces, during which many inhabitants of North Waziristan were forced to flee their homes in June 2014 to settle at IDP camps in Bannu and other districts, Dawar campaigned for the return of the refugees to their homes. He led the ANP's humanitarian efforts for the displaced persons, which included raising funds, distributing rations and establishing a school. He also highlighted a number of other issues faced by the returnees in his speeches and writings, such as the army's demolition of shops in his hometown, Miramshah.

At a press conference in Peshawar in November 2016, Dawar stated that before the launch of Operation Zarb-e-Azb, the terrorists in North Waziristan had already "shifted to other safer places and no resistance took place," but despite that, "hundreds of houses and around 8,000 shops in Miramshah were razed to the ground" during the operation. He added that expensive household items were also lost, but the government did not keep its commitment to compensate the affectees. In his opinion article for Al Jazeera in March 2021, Dawar reiterated that although "the state of Pakistan claims it has been successful in its military operations, the region remains volatile as groups allied with the Taliban continue to not only exist and operate in these areas within Pakistan, but also carry out operations like before across the border in Afghanistan."

Dawar's open criticism of the Pakistan Armed Forces, however, irritated ANP leaders, especially those who were looking to avoid confrontation with the military establishment. The ANP leaders were also annoyed when Dawar became one of the founding leaders of the Pashtun Tahafuz Movement (PTM) in February 2018. In spite of receiving no show-cause notice in advance or an opportunity to defend himself, Dawar's membership was suspended from the ANP on 20 March 2018 by the party's president, Asfandyar Wali Khan.

=== National Assembly and NDM ===
Dawar was elected to the National Assembly of Pakistan as an independent candidate from NA-48 (Tribal Area-IX) in the 2018 general election. He received 16,526 votes, defeating Mufti Misbahudin of the Muttahida Majlis-e-Amal (MMA) and Aurangzeb Khan of the Pakistan Tehreek-e-Insaf (PTI).

On 1 September 2021, Dawar founded a political party, National Democratic Movement (NDM). Some analysts claimed that the NDM would cause a set back for the PTM, a non-parliamentary political movement, and curtail its influence. However, Dawar insisted that the NDM would support the PTM. "The PTM is a joint movement and we remained part of it. I don’t think that the NDM will weaken the PTM," he said. Several other leaders who joined the NDM, including Jamila Gilani, Bushra Gohar, Afrasiab Khattak and Abdullah Nangyal, were also prominent activists in the PTM.

From 11 to 14 March 2022, he was part of the Pashtun National Jirga, which was held in Bannu to discuss the critical issues faced by the Pashtuns in Pakistan and Afghanistan.

=== Detentions ===
On 30 November 2018, Dawar and Ali Wazir, his fellow parliamentarian and PTM leader, were traveling to Dubai, UAE to attend a Pashtun cultural event, but they were offloaded from their flight at Bacha Khan International Airport, Peshawar. The Federal Investigation Agency kept Dawar and Wazir in custody for three days. Dawar demanded action against the personnel who arrested them without getting prior permission from the Speaker of the National Assembly.

On 30 May 2019, Dawar handed himself over to the police in Bannu after four days of hiding following the Kharqamar incident. Ali Wazir had already been arrested by the military in Kharqamar, North Waziristan, on 26 May. After almost four months in jail, Dawar and Wazir were released on bail on 21 September 2019. On 14 October 2020, the government withdrew the Kharqamar case against PTM, and Dawar and Wazir were acquitted of the charges against them.

On 28 January 2020, Dawar and 28 other protesters, including Ismat Shahjahan and Ammar Rashid of the Awami Workers Party (AWP), were arrested by the police outside the National Press Club in Islamabad, where they had gathered to stage a protest against the arrest of PTM chairman Manzoor Pashteen, who had been arrested in Peshawar a day earlier on allegations of sedition. Video footage from the protest showed Dawar was dragged by the police and detained in a police vehicle. Dawar and Ismat Shahjahan were released on 29 January but Ammar Rashid and 22 others were sent to jail on sedition charges; all charges were dropped against them on 17 February. Manzoor Pashteen was also released from jail on 25 February.

On 4 September 2020, Dawar was taken into custody at Quetta International Airport and barred from participating in political activities in Quetta. Dawar said the airport authorities informed him that he and Ali Wazir were banned from entering Balochistan for another 90 days. On 24 October 2020, he was again arrested at the airport to stop him from attending a Pakistan Democratic Movement (PDM) rally in Quetta. Akhtar Mengal, the president of the Balochistan National Party (Mengal), and Maryam Nawaz, a leader of the Pakistan Muslim League (N), condemned Dawar's arrest.

On 28 March 2021, the police arrested Dawar in Karak and Manzoor Pashteen in Kohat to prevent both of them from travelling to Bannu to join and lead the Janikhel protest march. The protest was called off on 29 March after an agreement was signed between the protesters and Mahmood Khan, the Chief Minister of Khyber Pakhtunkhwa, following which Dawar and Pashteen were released.

=== 2024 assassination attempt ===
On 10 February 2024, Dawar and his supporters faced a tragic incident in Miramshah, North Waziristan, during their protest against the delay in the announcement of election results from the NA-40 North Waziristan constituency in the 2024 Pakistani general election. As they gathered to express their grievances, the police opened fire on them. Dawar survived but sustained injuries, while three protesters were killed and several others were wounded. This event spurred a significant outcry among the local community and Dawar's supporters, leading to a large-scale rally in North Waziristan. The participants, including the NDM party and members of the Darpa Khel clan, strongly condemned the police action and demanded a judicial inquiry into the incident, alongside the arrest and prosecution of those responsible. The attack drew widespread condemnation, with calls for accountability for those responsible.

== See also ==
- Pashtun nationalism
- Afrasiab Khattak
- Bushra Gohar
- Jamila Gilani
- Gulalai Ismail
- Pakistan
