= NA-40 North Waziristan =

Constituency of the National Assembly of Pakistan

- Constituency for the National Assembly of Pakistan
- Region: North Waziristan
- Electorate: 430,484

Current constituency
- Party: Jamiat Ulema-e-Islam (F)
- Member: Misbahuddin
- Created from: NA-48 North Waziristan

NA-40 North Waziristan (این اے-40، شمالی وزیرستان) is a constituency for the National Assembly of Pakistan. The constituency comprises the entire North Waziristan in northwest Pakistan, bordering Afghanistan.

== Members of Parliament ==
=== 2002–2018: NA-40 Tribal Area-V ===
Election	Member	Party
2002	Molvi Nek Zaman	Independent
2008	Mohammad Kamran Khan	Independent
2013	Muhammad Nazeer Khan	Independent

=== 2018–2022: NA-48 Tribal Area-IX ===
Election	Member	Party
2018	Mohsin Dawar	IND

=== 2023–present: NA-40 North Waziristan ===
Election	Member	Party
2024	Misbahuddin	JUI(F)

== Election 2002 ==
General elections were held on 10 October 2002. Molvi Nek Zaman an independent candidate won by 14,773 votes.

== Election 2008 ==
The result of general election 2008 in this constituency is given below.

=== Result ===
Mohammad Kamran Khan succeeded in the election 2008 and became the member of National Assembly.

General Election 2008: Tribal Area-V
Party	Candidate	Votes	%
Independent	Mohammad Kamran Khan	5,894	23
Pakistan Citizen Movement	Abdul Qayyum	5,441	20
Independent	Aurang Zeb Khan	5,201	20
Others	Others	18,102	37

== Election 2013 ==
General elections were held on 11 May 2013. Muhammad Nazir Khan an independent candidate won by 18,055 votes and became the member of National Assembly.

== Election 2018 ==
General elections were held on 25 July 2018.

General election 2018: NA-48 Tribal Area-IX
Party	Candidate	Votes	%	±%
Independent	Mohsin Dawar	16,496	26.04	
MMA	Misbahuddin	15,352	24.24	
PTI	Aurangzeb Khan	10,369	16.37	
Independent	Muhammad Iqbal Khan	2,889	4.56	
JUI (S)	Qismat Khan Wazir	2,436	3.85	
PPP	Malik Ghulam Khan	2,313	3.65	
Independent	Ziaur Rehman	2,023	3.19	
Independent	Muhammad Niaz Khan	1,942	3.07	
Independent	Maulana Syed Naik Zaman Haqqani	1,598	2.52	
Independent	Javed Iqbal	1,279	2.02	
Independent	Naik Muhammad Khan	1,266	2.00	
Independent	Pir Muhammad Iqbal Ali Shah	973	1.54	
Independent	Muhammad Umar Akbar Khan	885	1.40	
QWP	Jahanzeb Khan	804	1.27	
Independent	Mohammad Kamran Khan	586	0.92	
Independent	Akbar Ali Khan	494	0.77	
Others	Others (nineteen candidates)	1,638	2.59	
Turnout		63,954	23.32	
Total valid votes		63,343	99.04	
Rejected ballots		611	0.96	
Majority		1,144	1.80	
Registered electors		274,205		
Independent gain from Independent				

== Election 2024 ==
General elections were held on 8 February 2024. Misbahuddin won the election with 43,400 votes.

General election 2024: NA-40 North Waziristan
Party	Candidate	Votes	%	±%
JUI (F)	Misbahuddin	43,400	30.50	N/A
PTI	Aurang Zeb Khan (Note: Filed nomination papers as PTI candidate but ECP allowed him to run as an independent)	33,799	23.75	▲7.38
NDM	Mohsin Dawar	33,256	23.37	N/A
Others	Others (twelve candidates)	31,842	22.38	
Turnout		144,312	33.52	▲10.20
Total valid votes		142,297	98.60	
Rejected ballots		2,015	1.40	
Majority		9,601	6.75	
Registered electors		430,484		
JUI (F) gain from NDM				

== See also ==
- NA-39 Bannu
- NA-41 Lakki Marwat
