= Nek Zaman =

Pakistani politician

Maulana Syed Nek Zaman

Member of Parliament for

Mayor of Miranshah
- Incumbent
- Assumed office 22 April 2022
- Governor: Haji Ghulam Ali; Faisal Karim Kundi
- Chief Minister: Mahmood Khan; Muhammad Azam Khan (Caretaker); Arshad Hussain Shah; Ali Amin Gandapur; Sohail Afridi
- Preceded by: Position Established

Member of the National Assembly of Pakistan
- In office 6 November 2002 – 2 October 2007
- Succeeded by: Mohammad Kamran Khan
- Constituency: NA-40 North Waziristan
- Majority: 9309

Personal details
- Born: Dawar Land Syed Thesil Datta Khel North Waziristan
- Party: JUI (F) (2002 - Present)
- Occupation: Ulema

Maulana Syed Nek Zaman is a Pakistani politician who served as a member of the 12th National Assembly of Pakistan from 6 November 2002 to 2 October 2007. He represented the National Assembly constituency NA-40 North Waziristan.
