= Mirakhel =

Coordinates: 32°51′9″N 70°38′39″E

- Town and union council
- Interactive map of Mirakhel
- Country: Pakistan
- Province: Khyber-Pakhtunkhwa
- District: Bannu District
- Time zone: UTC+5 (Pakistan Standard Time)

Mirakhel (Pashto: میراخېل) or Mira Khel is a town and union council in Bannu District of Khyber-Pakhtunkhwa. It is located at 32°51'9N 70°38'39E and has an altitude of 314 metres (1033 feet).

== Pashtun National Jirga ==
On 11-14 March 2022, the Pashtun National Jirga was held at Mirakhel Cricket Ground in order to defend the rights of the Pashtun people in the country. The critical issues which were faced by the Pashtuns were discussed during the jirga in a bid to suggest solutions to them.
