= Misbahuddin =

Member of the National Assembly of Pakistan from North Waziristan (2024–2029)

- مصباحُ الدین

Member of the National Assembly of Pakistan
- Incumbent
- Assumed office 29 February 2024
- Constituency: NA-40 North Waziristan

Personal details
- Party: JUI (F) (2018-present)

Misbahuddin (Urdu: مصباحُ الدین), is a Pakistani politician who is a member of the National Assembly of Pakistan since February 2024.

== Political career ==
Misbahuddin won the 2024 Pakistani general election from NA-40 North Waziristan as a Jamiat Ulema-e-Islam (F) candidate. He received 42,994 votes, while independent supported (PTI) Pakistan Tehreek-e-Insaf, candidate Aurangzeb Khan was the runner up with 33,852 votes.
