= Basheer Matta =

Pakistani politician

Basheer Ahmad Khan Matta

Personal details
- Party: National Democratic Movement

Basheer Ahmad Khan Matta (Pashto: بشیر احمد خان مټه; Urdu: بشیر احمد خان مٹہ) is a Pakistani politician and historian who is a senior member of the National Democratic Movement (NDM). He is a supporter of the Pashtun Tahafuz Movement (PTM), and was formerly a member of the Senate of Pakistan.

Matta has formerly served as the chairman of the organizing committee and foreign affairs committee of the Awami National Party (ANP). For a time, he also served as the acting provincial president of ANP Khyber Pakhtunkhwa.

== Books ==
Matta is the author of several books in Pashto and English languages. One of his English books is Sher Shah Suri: A Fresh Perspective, which is a historical account of Sher Shah Suri, the 16th-century Afghan ruler who founded the Sur Empire in India.

One of his Pashto books is Da Paktā Waynā (د پکتا وینا, lit. "Paktā's Speech"). It is written in an allegorical format and addressed to the Pashtun nation.
