= Arfa Siddiq =

Pakistani politician

- عارفه صدیق
- Born: 28 January 1987 (age 39); Samkhel, Muslim Bagh, Killa Saifullah, Balochistan, Pakistan
- Political party: Pashtunkhwa Milli Awami Party
- Movement: Pashtun Tahafuz Movement
- Parent(s): Ghulam Siddiq Kakar (father)

Member of the Provincial Assembly of Balochistan
- In office 29 May 2013 – 31 May 2018
- Constituency: Reserved seat for women

Arfa Siddiq Kakar (Pashto: عارفه صدیق کاکړه, Urdu: عارفہ صدیق کاکڑ; born 28 January 1987), also spelled Arifa Siddique, is a Pakistani politician and human rights activist from the town of Muslim Bagh in northern Balochistan, Pakistan. She is a supporter of the Pashtun Tahafuz Movement (PTM). From 2013 to 2018, she was a member of the Provincial Assembly of Balochistan as a candidate from the Pashtunkhwa Milli Awami Party (PkMAP). She hails from the Kakar tribe of Pashtuns.

== Early life and education ==
Siddiq was born on 28 January 1987 in Muslim Bagh in the Killa Saifullah District of Balochistan, Pakistan. She has done Bachelor of Science in Information Technology and Master of Arts in Political Science.

== Political career ==
Siddiq was elected to the Provincial Assembly of Balochistan as a candidate of PkMAP on a reserved seat for women in the 2013 Pakistani general election.

== Detention in Loralai ==
On 9 February 2020, just before PTM's public gathering in Loralai to mark the first death anniversary of Arman Loni, security forces arrested Arfa Siddiq, Wranga Loni, Sanna Ejaz, and other female PTM activists as they headed to the gathering site. The security forces released them, however, when political activists gathered outside the police station to protest for them.
