= Sanna Ejaz =

Pakistani human rights activist

- ثنا اعجاز
- Education: University of Peshawar; Plymouth State University, United States
- Occupation: human rights activist
- Movement: Pashtun Tahafuz Movement

Sanna Ejaz (Pashto: ثنا اعجاز) or Sana Ijaz, is a Pakistani journalist and human rights activist from Khyber Pakhtunkhwa. She is a leading member of the Pashtun Tahafuz Movement (PTM), as well as a founding member of the Waak Movement, which aims to bring political awareness among Pashtun women. She focuses on advocacy to promote women's role in peacebuilding, reconciliation, and social activism. She was formerly the vice-president of the youth wing of Awami National Party (ANP).

== Career and social activism ==
Sanna worked as an anchor and host at the state-owned Pakistan Television Corporation (PTV) for two and a half years. However, she was fired from her job on 9 May 2018 because of her activism at PTM. In late 2018, she also lost her job at a nongovernmental advocacy organization, Shirkat Gah. Regarding her association with PTM, she said: "I was not doing anything wrong by supporting a peaceful demand for justice, for constitutional rights, and for peace. I will not back down."

On 9 February 2020, just before PTM's public gathering in Loralai, Balochistan to mark the first death anniversary of Arman Loni, security forces arrested Sanna Ejaz, Wranga Loni, Arfa Siddiq, and other female PTM activists headed for to the gathering site. They were released the same day.

== See also ==
- Gulalai Ismail
- Bushra Gohar
