= Mohammad Kamran Khan =

Pakistani politician

Member of the National Assembly of Pakistan
- In office 2008–2013
- Constituency: NA-40 (Tribal Area-V)

Mohammad Kamran Khan is a Pakistani politician who served as a member of the National Assembly of Pakistan from 2008 to 2013.

== Political career ==
He was elected to the National Assembly of Pakistan from Constituency NA-40 (Tribal Area-V) as an independent candidate in the 2008 Pakistani general election. He received 5,894 votes and defeated Abdul Qayyum, a candidate of Pakistan Citizen Movement. He was criticized by some voters for failing to introduce any major development projects in his constituency during his tenure.

He ran for the seat of the National Assembly from Constituency NA-40 (Tribal Area-V) as an independent candidate of in 2013 Pakistani general election but was unsuccessful. He received 3,259 votes and lost the seat to Muhammad Nazeer Khan.
