= Tahir Dawar =

Pakistani police officer

SP M. Tahir Khan Dawar
- محمد طاهر خان داوړ
- Born: 4 December 1968; Khadi, Mirali, North Waziristan, Pakistan
- Disappeared: October 26, 2018; Islamabad, Pakistan
- Died: Few days before 13 November 2018 (aged 49)
- Cause of death: Excessive torture
- Body discovered: 13 November 2018; Dur Baba, Nangarhar, Afghanistan
- Burial place: Hayatabad, Peshawar, Khyber Pakhtunkhwa, Pakistan; Initially buried for a day in Momand Dara, Nangarhar, Afghanistan; 33.9656°N 71.4306°E
- Military career
- Allegiance: Pakistan
- Service: Khyber Pakhtunkhwa Police and Federal Investigation Agency
- Service years: 1995–2018
- Rank: Superintendent of Police
- Wars: War in North-West Pakistan
- Awards: Quaid-e-Azam Police Medal (2011)
- Other work: Pashto poetry

Mohammad Tahir Khan Dawar (Urdu: طاہر داوڑ; Pashto: طاهر داوړ) was a Pakistani police officer who was abducted from Islamabad on 26 October 2018 and taken to Afghanistan where he was tortured and killed. His body was found on 13 November 2018 by the locals in the Dur Baba District of Nangarhar Province, Afghanistan, close to the Torkham border crossing. His postmortem report revealed he had no marks of bullet injury, but was rather killed by excessive torture during captivity. He was kept hungry and thirsty for several days, and his legs and arms were broken. He had died a few days before his body was found.

Iftikhar Durrani, the spokesperson of prime minister Imran Khan, laughed away Tahir's kidnapping report in a Voice of America interview on 28 October, alleging that Tahir was not abducted but was safe in Peshawar. After the discovery of his dead body, some Pakistani officials, including the Pakistan Army spokesman Major General Asif Ghafoor, expressed concern over a possible involvement of foreign hands behind the murder. A joint investigation team was formed by the government to probe the murder, but Tahir's family criticized the government for the lack of progress in the investigation.

Tahir's family, as well as several politicians and activists, demanded that the murder should be investigated through an international commission because the case involved two countries. The Pashtun Tahafuz Movement (PTM) held countrywide protests against the murder. His family also complained that the Pakistani government made no serious efforts to recover Tahir while he was missing for more than two weeks.

== Education and career ==
Tahir completed his secondary education in 1982 in Eidak, a village west of Mirali on the periphery of Miramshah, the capital city of North Waziristan. He did his higher secondary education (FA) in 1984. He completed his bachelor's degree in 1989 in Miramshah, and started his career in nursing and teaching in North Waziristan.

=== Police career in Bannu ===
In 1995, he joined the Khyber Pakhtunkhwa Police as assistant sub-inspector in Bannu. He continued his studies while working in the police and completed his master's degree in Pashto in 1997.

He was appointed as station house officer at a police station in Bannu in 1998. He was promoted as sub-inspector in 2002 and as inspector in 2007. He was posted to Morocco and Sudan as part of the United Nations peacekeeping mission in 2003 and 2005, respectively.

While posted in Bannu, he was wounded 3 times during a clash with militants in 2005. Subsequently, the militants did suicide attack his home in Bannu in 2008, killing his guard. Dawar once volunteered to supply arms and ammunition to the Hawed police station in Bannu. However, the control room made an error, and the information was not passed on to the police station. The police opened fire on him due to the confusion, and he received a gunshot wound to his right arm. He narrowly survived two suicide attacks by the Taliban in 2007 and 2009, in the latter of which he was wounded.

Tahir received the Quaid-e-Azam Police Medal, the highest award for a police officer in Pakistan, for his gallantry and dedication with job.

=== Federal Investigation Agency ===
In March 2009, Tahir was transferred to the Federal Investigation Agency (FIA), a border control and counterintelligence security agency in Pakistan. He worked at FIA as an assistant director in Peshawar. He was also sent to Australia and Romania as part of his duty. However, after his stint with FIA at Bacha Khan International Airport, Peshawar, he left it in July 2013.

=== Police career in Peshawar ===
Tahir rejoined the Khyber Pakhtunkhwa Police in July 2013 and served as deputy superintendent of police (DSP) Crime Circle Peshawar, DSP Capital City Police Office, and DSP Faqeerabad Peshawar. He was promoted as superintendent of police (SP) Rural Circle Peshawar in 2018.

=== Political views ===
Tahir had sympathy for the Pashtun Tahafuz Movement (PTM). When Mohsin Dawar, one of the founding leaders of PTM, won his seat in the 2018 general elections to represent North Waziristan in the National Assembly of Pakistan, Tahir said: “The people of Waziristan have hope that Mohsin Dawar will honor the right of representation and will take the voice of the oppressed to the assembly, whose fury the assembly’s mic will perhaps be unable to withstand.”

In an old video which went viral on social media after his death, Tahir was seen addressing a group protesters, and arguing that India, the United States, and Afghanistan were behind many conspiracies against Pakistan in general and Peshawar in particular. He said that the Indian intelligence agency RAW, the US CIA, and Afghanistan posed threats to Pakistan, and that the focus of their activities was to target the China–Pakistan Economic Corridor.

== Abduction and murder ==
On 26 October 2018, Tahir was abducted from Islamabad, Pakistan, where he had arrived the same day from Peshawar to attend a meeting.

“At 6:30pm [26 October], Tahir talked to his wife in Peshawar and told her that he was in Islamabad and may return if the meeting is over soon, otherwise he would be coming back on Saturday [27 October]. However, at 7:15pm [27 October], his wife received a text message that Tahir was in Sarai Alamgir near Jhelum.” Another message said: “There is a signal issue in the area; so do not panic if my mobile is found switched off.” The police officials investigating the kidnapping case informed that Tahir had dinner on 26 October at his residence in Islamabad, then he went out alone on foot at around 7pm, and his mobile phone was found to be switched off from around 8pm. Geo-fencing of his mobile phone and number revealed that his last location before being kidnapped was at G-10/4 area of Islamabad. On 27 October, his mobile phone was switched on at a location in Sarai Alamgir, then switched off again, after which there was no trace of his mobile phone or SIM card.

On 13 November, i.e. 18 days after Tahir's disappearance, his tortured dead body was found about 100 meters away from the Durand Line, in the Dur Baba District of the province of Nangarhar, Afghanistan. He was buried the same day at a cemetery in the Momand Dara area in Nangarhar, after the washing and shrouding of his body and performing the Islamic funeral prayer for him. On 14 November, Tahir's body was exhumed from the cemetery in Momand Dara, and carried to Jalalabad on the order of Hayatullah Hayat, Governor of Nangarhar. The body would subsequently be carried from Jalalabad to Peshawar, Pakistan. On 15 November, the body was received at the Torkham . Pakistan's State Minister of Interior Shehryar Afridi and Khyber Pakhtunkhwa's Information Minister Shaukat Yousafzai were also present at the jirga in Torkham. The same day, separate Islamic funeral prayers were reperformed for Tahir at Police lines.

Shehryar Afridi, Pakistan's State Minister of Interior, stated during his speech at the Senate of Pakistan that Tahir was shifted from Islamabad to Nangarhar through northern Punjab, Mianwali, and Bannu. He said: "SP Tahir was transported from Islamabad to Punjab, where he was kept for a couple of days. Then he stayed in Mianwali for three to four days, and then he was taken to Bannu." Shehryar Afridi also complained that at least 600 of the 1800 surveillance cameras installed under the Safe City Project in Islamabad were not working and that not one camera could read a vehicle's number plate or a person's face.

=== Responsibility ===
The authorities in Islamabad initially said that the Pakistani Taliban abducted Tahir, but the Pakistani Taliban denied involvement. Some Pakistani officials, on condition of anonymity, claimed that the Afghan intelligence agency carried out Tahir's murder. In a Pashto note handwritten on a blank piece of paper, which was reportedly placed on the chest of the dead body of Tahir, the Islamic State of Iraq and the Levant – Khorasan Province (ISIL-KP) claimed responsibility of the murder. However, there was no official claim of responsibility from Amaq Agency, the news outlet linked to Islamic State of Iraq and the Levant (ISIL). Some political analysts, journalists, and activists have questioned the authenticity of the handwritten note found besides the body, arguing that ISIL makes its official claims through Amaq Agency, not in this manner. Mohsin Dawar, who represents North Waziristan in the National Assembly of Pakistan and is one of the leaders of the Pashtun Tahafuz Movement, was also unconvinced. Mohsin Dawar accused the Pakistani military of being an accomplice in the murder, and said: “For more than 15 years, we have seen this deceptive drama that people are murdered and then their corpses are left with a note from militants. We will not be deceived. How was he taken from Islamabad?” Calling for an international commission to investigate the murder case rather than investigating it internally, Mohsin Dawar said: "We reject an internal inquiry. We know that our investigation authorities can’t question certain powers."

Tahir's brothers said that a few days before his disappearance, Tahir had arrested suspected militants in Peshawar with heavy weapons which were being transported to Afghanistan. Tahir took the suspects into custody, but on the intervention of the senior superintendent of police (SSP), they were soon released. Tahir's family claimed that these suspects could be behind the murder.

=== Investigation ===
On 16 November 2018, a seven-member joint investigation team was formed to probe the murder. The team was headed by the Superintendent of Police Investigation in Islamabad, while the other members were the Sub-Divisional Police Officer (SDPO) at Islamabad Shalimar Circle, the Deputy Superintendent of Police (DSP) from the Counter Terrorism Department (CTD), the investigating officer of the case, and one representative each from the Inter-Services Intelligence (ISI), the Military Intelligence (MI), and the Intelligence Bureau (IB), the three Pakistani intelligence agencies.

Nadia Tahir, daughter of Tahir Dawar, said in October 2019 that the team made no tangible progress in investigating the murder. Ahmaduddin, brother of Tahir Dawar, said "the joint investigation team called several friends of Tahir Dawar, including former member of the Provincial Assembly of Khyber Pakhtunkhwa Adnan Wazir, Brigadier Naeem Bhatti, and Additional Accountant General Islamabad Sharifullah Khan. The friends told us that the joint investigation team questioned them like a team of the National Accountability Bureau (NAB) and asked questions about the assets of Tahir Dawar. The investigators did not pose any questions about Tahir Dawar’s abduction and murder." Ahmaduddin claimed that prime minister Imran Khan had promised to probe the murder through a UN commission if the family was not satisfied with the joint investigation team report; however, when asked to do so, Imran Khan refused by arguing that a UN commission had previously investigated the assassination of Benazir Bhutto but its performance was unsatisfactory.

=== Reactions ===
==== Pakistani government ====
Prime Minister Imran Khan condemned the murder and called it a shocking tragedy. He ordered its immediate inquiry and tasked Pakistan's State Minister of Interior Shehryar Afridi to oversee it. The Pakistan Army spokesman Major General Asif Ghafoor also condemned the murder saying we lost our brave officer and Hinting at a broader involvement of foreign powers behind the case, Asif Ghafoor said: “[Tahir's] abduction, move to Afghanistan, murder and follow up behavior of Afghan authorities raises questions, which indicate involvement or resources more than a terrorist organization in Afghanistan.”

==== Afghan government ====
Omar Zakhilwal, Afghanistan's ambassador in Islamabad, expressed grief over the case and asked the governments of Afghanistan and Pakistan to sit together and talk about who would have murdered Tahir. He promised that the Afghan government would investigate the case.

==== Pashtun Tahafuz Movement ====
Supporters of the Pashtun Tahafuz Movement (PTM) held protest rallies in several cities of Pakistan and demanded for an international commission to investigate the case. They chanted slogans against the Pakistan Army and intelligence agencies, whom they accused to be involved in the abduction and murder. Mohsin Dawar, who is one of the leaders of PTM and also represents North Waziristan in the National Assembly of Pakistan, expressed shock over Tahir's murder and said: “Explaining this in the same old ‘good’ and ‘bad’ Taliban drama will not work anymore. The State of Pakistan is responsible for his martyrdom and we demand answers. His abductors have to be made answerable.”

==== Opposition parties in Pakistan ====
Pashtunkhwa Milli Awami Party's leader Mahmood Khan Achakzai equated the murder of Tahir with Jamal Khashoggi, saying "both incidents required international probe." Awami National Party held protest rallies in several cities across Khyber Pakhtunkhwa and backed the demand of PTM to call for an international inquiry. Qaumi Watan Party also protested against the murder and demanded for an early arrest of the killers. Pakistan Muslim League (N) and Pakistan Peoples Party criticized the government of Pakistan for failing to provide security to Tahir in the capital Islamabad.

==== Package for Tahir's family ====
On 4 Dec 2018, Shehryar Afridi, the State Minister of Interior, announced a package of Rs70 million for Tahir's family. He said prime minister Imran Khan had approved the package.

However, in October 2019, Tahir's daughter Nadia disclosed that the federal government had not paid them the Rs70 million compensation despite announcing it, and that the Pakistan Army had paid them Rs25 million"

== Tahir's poetry ==
Tahir wrote poetry in Pashto language. Some of his ghazals have been sung by local singers with music. The following Pashto poem is an example of his poetry, in which he describes his war-torn homeland, Waziristan:

ځان مې وران، جهان مې وران شو، لښکر وران شو
My life is ruined, my world is ruined, my army is ruined
کور مې وران شو، در مې وران شو، ګودر وران شو
My home is ruined, my door is ruined, my riverbank is ruined
د سهار بلبل رنګینې نغمې پرېښوې
The morning's nightingale stopped chirping colorful songs
ماښام وران شو، ګلورین مازدیګر وران شو
The evening is ruined, the afternoon full of flowers is ruined
هرې خوا ته دي ویرونه ژړاګانې
Everywhere people are mourning and crying
په څپېړو مې د پېغلو ځیګر وران شو
By slapping in grief, the bosom of our damsels is ruined
زه طاهر داوړ ګناه نه خبر نشوم
Even though I, Tahir Dawar, have not known my sin,
سر مې وران شو، سر د پاسه مې سر وران شو
My head is ruined, the head atop of my head [the elders of my tribe] is ruined

== See also ==
- Killing of Naqeebullah Mehsud
- Arman Loni
- List of kidnappings
- Lists of solved missing person cases
- Mohsin Dawar
- Malik Saad
- Safwat Ghayur
- Waziristan
