= Jamila Gilani =

Pakistani politician

- جمیله ګیلاني
- Born: 5 January 1960 (age 66); Mian Sahib Sarai, Mardan, Khyber Pakhtunkhwa, Pakistan
- Political party: National Democratic Movement
- Parent(s): Mian Farid Khan (father)

Member of the National Assembly of Pakistan
- In office 2008–2013
- Constituency: Reserved seat for women

Jamila Gilani (Pashto: جمیله ګیلاني; Urdu: جمیلہ گیلانی; also spelled Jamila Gallani) is a Pakistani politician who is the spokesperson of the National Democratic Movement (NDM). She served as a member of the National Assembly of Pakistan from 2008 to 2013. She is an activist in the Pashtun Tahafuz Movement (PTM), a social movement campaigning for Pashtun human rights. She was formerly the central joint secretary of the Awami National Party (ANP).

== Early life ==
Gilani was born on 5 January 1960 in Mardan, Khyber Pukhtunkhwah, Pakistan. Her father, Mian Farid Khan, was an active member of the Khudai Khidmatgar movement and other left-oriented movements. His well known hotel, Mia Srai, was the hub of progressive political activists. She got politics in inheritance from childhood due to her father's active role in politics.

== Political career ==
Gilani was elected to the National Assembly of Pakistan as a candidate of Awami National Party (ANP) on a seat reserved for women from Khyber Pakhtunkhwa in the 2008 Pakistani general election.

On 12 November 2018, she left ANP in protest when the party suspended the memberships of Bushra Gohar and Afrasiab Khattak.
