= Abdul Qahar Wadan =

Pakistani politician

Member of the National Assembly of Pakistan
- In office 30 August 2013 – 31 May 2018
- Constituency: NA-262 (Killa Abdullah)

Personal details
- Party: Pakhtun-khwa Milli Awami Party

Abdul Qahar Khan Wadan (Pashto: عبدالقھارخان ودان) is a Pakistani politician who had been a member of the National Assembly of Pakistan from August 2013 to May 2018.

== Political career ==
He ran for the seat of the Provincial Assembly of Balochistan as a candidate of Pakhtun-khwa Milli Awami Party (PKMAP) from Constituency PB-12 (Qilla Abdullah-II) in the 2013 Pakistani general election but was unsuccessful. He received 5,822 votes and lost the seat to Zmrak Khan.

He was elected to the National Assembly of Pakistan as a candidate of the PKMAP from Constituency NA-262 (Killa Abdullah) in by-election held in August 2013. The seat became vacant after Mehmood Khan Achakzai who won it May 2013 election vacated the seat in order to retain the seat won in his home National Assembly constituency.
