= Haider Khel =

Village in Pakistan

Haider Khel حیدر خیل
- Village
- Tochi Valley in 1912
- Location within FATA Location within Pakistan
- Coordinates: 32.9449°N 70.2960°E
- Country: Pakistan
- Territory: Federally Administered Tribal Areas
- District: North Waziristan
- Tehsil: Mir Ali
- Founded: 1910
- Founder: Haji Mir Zali Khan

Government
  - Councillor: Malik Muhammad Noor Khan
  - Mayor: Muhammad Rafiq Nasar Khel
- Elevation: 460 m (1,510 ft)

Population (2017)
  - Total: 10,001
- Time zone: UTC+5 (PST)
- Postal code: 28191
- Area code: 0092-928

Haider Khel is a village in the North Waziristan District of Bannu Division, Pakistan, 50 kilometres (30 miles) to the east of Bannu, lying close to the border with Afghanistan. Its inhabitants are mainly Pashtun-speaking Dawaris.

== History ==
In 1896, during the Tochi Expedition, the British set up a military post in the village as part of its defences against raids from the Waziris. On the 8th of December 1897 forces under the order of Major General Symons marched ten miles from Mastura to Camp Haider Khel. The camp at Haider Khel was directly south of the Aka Khel country, the Aka Khels had joined forces with the Zakha Khels in opposition to the British, the camp was one of the staging posts for action against the rebels.
