= Muhammad Nazeer Khan =

Pakistani politician

- محمدنذیرخان

Federal Parliamentary Secretary for Federal Education and professional Training
- In office 2013–2017
- President: Mamnoon Hussain
- Prime Minister: Mian Nawaz Sharif

Member of the National Assembly of Pakistan
- In office 1 June 2013 – 31 May 2018
- Constituency: NA-40 (North Waziristan Agency)

Personal details
- Born: 1 January 1971 (age 55)
- Party: PML(N) (2013-Present)

Muhammad Nazeer Khan (Urdu: محمد نذیر خان; born 1 January 1971) is a Pakistani politician who served as member of the National Assembly of Pakistan, from June 2013 to May 2018.

== Early life ==
He was born on 1 January 1971.

== Political career ==
He was elected to the National Assembly of Pakistan as an independent candidate from Constituency NA-40 (Tribal Area-V) in the 2013 Pakistani general election. He received 18,055 votes; Aurangzeb Khan, another independent candidate, was the runner-up with 14,794 votes. During his tenure as Member of the National Assembly, he served as the Federal Parliamentary Secretary for Federal Education and Professional Training.
