= Obaidullah Babat =

Pakistani politician

Member of the Provincial Assembly of Balochistan
- In office 29 May 2013 – 31 May 2018

Personal details
- Born: 5 May 1958 (age 67) Loralai
- Party: Pashtunkhwa National Awami Party

Ubaid Ullah Jan Babat (Pashto: عبیدالله بابت), also known as Babat Lala (بابت لالا) is a Pakistani politician who was a Member of the Provincial Assembly of Balochistan, from May 2013 to May 2018 affiliated with Pashtunkhwa Milli Awami Party. He was born in Bori. He belongs to Kakar tribe (Shabozi - Sub-tribe).

== Early life and education ==
He was born on 5 May 1958 in Loralai.

== Political career ==
He was elected to the Provincial Assembly of Balochistan as a candidate of Pashtunkhwa Milli Awami Party from Constituency PB-16 Loralai-II in the 2013 Pakistani general election.
