= Nasrullah Zayrai =

Pakistani politician

Member of the Provincial Assembly of Balochistan
- In office 13 August 2018 – 12 August 2023
- Constituency: PB-31 Quetta-VIII
- In office 29 May 2013 – 31 May 2018
- Constituency: PB-5 Quetta-V

President of PKNAP, Balochistan, Pakistan
- Incumbent
- Assumed office 9 November 2023
- Chairman: Khushal Khan Kakar

Personal details
- Born: 8 March 1966 (age 60) Quetta, Balochistan, Pakistan
- Party: PKNAP (2023-present)
- Other political affiliations: PkMAP (2013-2023)

Nasrullah Khan Zayrai (Pashto: نصرالله خان زېری), or Nasrullah Khan Bareach (نصرالله بړېڅ), is a Pashtun politician who is elected twice as a Member of the Provincial Assembly of Balochistan, from August 2018 to August 2023 and from May 2013 to May 2018. He remained in student politics and was one of the founding member of the Pashtoonkhwa Students Organization.

== Early life and education ==
Born on 8 March 1966 in Quetta, Nasrallah completed his early education at Historic Sandman High School and his higher secondary education at Govt Science College, both located in Quetta. His political journey began in the early 80s as a young student at Science College, where he was actively involved with the Pashtoonkhwa Students Organization (PSO).

With a Master of Science degree and a Bachelor of Laws degree, he practices as an advocate professionally.

== Political career ==
He was elected to the Provincial Assembly of Balochistan as a candidate of Pashtunkhwa Milli Awami Party (PMAP) from PB-5 Quetta-V in the 2013 Balochistan provincial election. He received 8,530 votes and defeated Ahmed Nawaz Baloch, a candidate of the Balochistan National Party (Mengal) (BNP-M).

He was again elected to the Provincial Assembly as a candidate of the PMAP from PB-31 Quetta-VIII in the 2018 Balochistan provincial election. He received 4,278 votes and defeated Mir Lashkari Raisani, a candidate of the BNP-M.

He served as Parliamentary Leader of the PMAP in the assembly. He remained as chairman of the standing committee on foods and agriculture. He was a member of public accounts committee and several other in house committees.

On 9 November 2023, he was elected unopposed to the presidency of the Balochistan chapter of the newly formed Pashtoonkhwa National Awami Party Pakistan. On 1 January 2024, his election was notified by the Election Commission of Pakistan (ECP).
