= Wranga Loni =

Pakistani human rights activist

- وړانګه لوڼۍ
- Occupations: human rights activist, poet
- Movement: Pashtun Tahafuz Movement
- Father: Mohammad Ismail Loni
- Relatives: Arman Loni (brother)

Wranga Loni (Pashto: وړانګه لوڼۍ, Urdu: وڑانگہ لونی; also spelled Wrranga Lunri or Wrranga Luni) is a Pakistani human rights activist and writer from Sanjawi in northern Balochistan, Pakistan. She is a member of the Pashtun Tahafuz Movement (PTM), and of the Waak Movement, which aims to bring political awareness among Pashtun women.

== Social activism ==
Wranga joined the PTM in February 2018 along with her elder brother, Arman Loni. Both of them actively took part in organizing the PTM public gatherings, usually traveling to the gathering site a week earlier to help run awareness campaigns among the locals. Wranga recalled, “[Arman] said women’s awareness was important for our future survival in peace and with human dignity.” At the gatherings, Wranga would mostly give speeches from the stage but Arman would usually prefer to be behind the scenes. The activities of Arman and Wranga irked the local tribal chiefs, because of which Arman's family was forced to move from their native Sanjawi to Killa Saifullah, the hometown of Nawab Ayaz Jogezai, a Pashtun tribal chief who offered them refuge. On 2 February 2019, after Wranga and Arman participated at a protest sit-in outside Loralai Press Club in Loralai, her brother was allegedly killed during a crackdown by the police. The police, however, refused to lodge an FIR, which was criticized by Shireen Mazari, the federal Human Rights Minister.

On 9 February 2020, just before PTM's public gathering in Loralai to mark the first death anniversary of Arman Loni, security forces briefly detained Wranga Loni, Arfa Siddiq, Sanna Ejaz, and other female PTM activists on their way to the gathering site.

== See also ==
- Gulalai Ismail
- Bushra Gohar
