= Abdul Rahim Ziaratwal =

Pakistani politician

Abdul Rahim Ziaratwal Minister

Education Minister Provincial Assembly of Balochistan
- In office 13 January 2016 – 2018
- Constituency: PB-22 (Sibi-II)

Member of the Provincial Assembly of Balochistan
- In office 31 May 2013 – 2018
- In office 2002–2007

Minister for information Provincial Assembly of Balochistan
- In office June 2013 – December 2016

Personal details
- Born: 4 May 1954 (age 72) Ziarat, Baluchistan, Pakistan
- Party: Pashtunkhwa Milli Awami Party
- Education: University of Balochistan
- Occupation: Politician

Abdul Rahim Khan Ziaratwal (Urdu: عبد الرحيم خان زيارتوال; borne 4 May 1954) is a Pakistani politician hailing from Ziarat, Balochistan and belongs to Pashtunkhwa Milli Awami Party. He served currently serving as Minister of Education of Balochistan. He is also serving as committee member of Finance Committee and Public Accounts Committee.

== Education and political career ==
Abdul Rahim Ziaratwal belong to Tareen tribe. He achieved the degree of BA, Msc in Statistics and LLB from University of Balochistan. He was elected as a Member of the Provincial Assembly of Balochistan from 2000 to 2007 in the 2002 General Elections. He is also served as the Chairman of Legislative Development Steering Committee of USAID PLSP. He is also served as board member of Pashtoonkhwa Blood Bank. He is also served as Minister of Information in the Provincial Assembly of Balochistan.
