= PB-22 Sibi-II =

Constituency of the Provincial Assembly of Balochistan, Pakistan

- Former constituency for the Provincial Assembly of Balochistan
- Region: Sibi District

Former constituency
- Created: 2002
- Abolished: 2018

PB-22 Sibi-II (پی بی-22 سبی-2) was a constituency of the Provincial Assembly of Balochistan.

== General elections 2013 ==
Contesting candidates	Party affiliation	Votes polled

== General elections 2008 ==
Contesting candidates	Party affiliation	Votes polled

== See also ==
- Balochistan
- Provincial Assembly of Balochistan
