= Farhatullah Babar =

Pakistani politician

Parliamentarian Farhatullah Babar

Spokesperson of Presidential Office
- In office 9 September 2008 – 9 September 2013
- President: Asif Ali Zardari
- Prime Minister: Yusuf Raza Gillani
- Preceded by: Major-General Rashid Qureshi

President of the Pakistan Engineering Council
- In office 1983–1994

Personal details
- Born: Farhatullah Babar Peshawar, North-West Frontier Province, Pakistan
- Other political affiliations: Pakistan Peoples Party
- Education: University of Engineering and Technology of Peshawar (BEng and MEng); University of Peshawar (BA and MA)
- Occupation: Politician, engineer
- Cabinet: Bhutto Ministry; Gillani Ministry

Farhatullah Babar (Urdu, Pashto: فرحت اللہ بابر) is a Pakistani leftist politician, engineer and former senator. He is a prominent member of the Pakistan Peoples Party (PPP), having served as a spokesperson for the party.

He remained a member of the Senate of Pakistan for two terms, from 2003 to 2006 and from 2012 to 2018.

== Early life and education ==
Babar was born to Karamatullah Khan in Peshawar. He graduated with a B.Eng. in civil engineering from the University of Peshawar in 1965, followed by a M.Eng. in civil engineering in 1985. In 1963, he completed a course in Pashto with honours and later undertook a French language course in 1981.

== Professional career ==
Babar worked as a civil engineer. He served as the president of the Pakistan Engineering Council from 1983 to 1994, and also worked for some time at the Pakistan Atomic Energy Commission. He also served as a manager in the Trans Arabia project with the Royal Saudi Air Force, based in Riyadh.

== Political career ==
Babar served as a spokesman and speech writer for Benazir Bhutto when she was in office as prime minister in the 1990s. Later, he also served as the press secretary of her husband, Asif Ali Zardari, when he was elected as Pakistan's president in 2008. Prior to this appointment, Babar was elected as a member of the Senate of Pakistan from PPP between 2003 and 2006. He served another term as senator from 2012 to 2018. He is regarded as a senior member among the PPP's leadership.

As a senator, Babar was known for his activism and legislative work relating to human rights, democracy, religious freedom, political transparency, provincial autonomy, and matters involving civil-military relations. He was the managing editor of the Peshawar-based English daily, The Frontier Post.

On 17 September 2007, Benazir Bhutto accused then-president Pervez Musharraf's allies of pushing Pakistan into crisis by refusing to restore democracy and sharing power. A nine-member panel of Supreme Court judges deliberated on six petitions seeking to disqualify Musharraf as a presidential candidate. Bhutto had stated that her party may join forces with other opposition parties, including Nawaz Sharif's. The Attorney General of Pakistan, Malik Mohammad Qayyum, stated that, pendente lite, the Election Commission was "reluctant" to announce the schedule for the presidential vote. Babar stated that the Constitution could bar Musharraf from being elected again because he also held the army chief's post: "As General Musharraf is disqualified from contesting for President, he has prevailed upon the Election Commission to arbitrarily and illegally tamper with the Constitution of Pakistan."

In May 2018, Babar was one of the 30 people nominated by the Pashtun Tahaffuz Movement (PTM) for a jirga, which was held to negotiate between the PTM and the Pakistani government. His nomination was requested by the PTM leader Manzoor Pashteen during his phone call with the PPP chairman Bilawal Bhutto Zardari.

== Books ==
- How Elections Are Rigged in Pakistan (Shaheed Bhutto Foundation, 2007)
- The Zardari Presidency (2008-2013) — Now It Must be Told (Lightstone Publishers, 2025)
- Benazir Bhutto — She Walked Into The Fire (Lightstone Publishers, 2025)
