= Abdullah Nangyal =

- عبدالله ننګیال
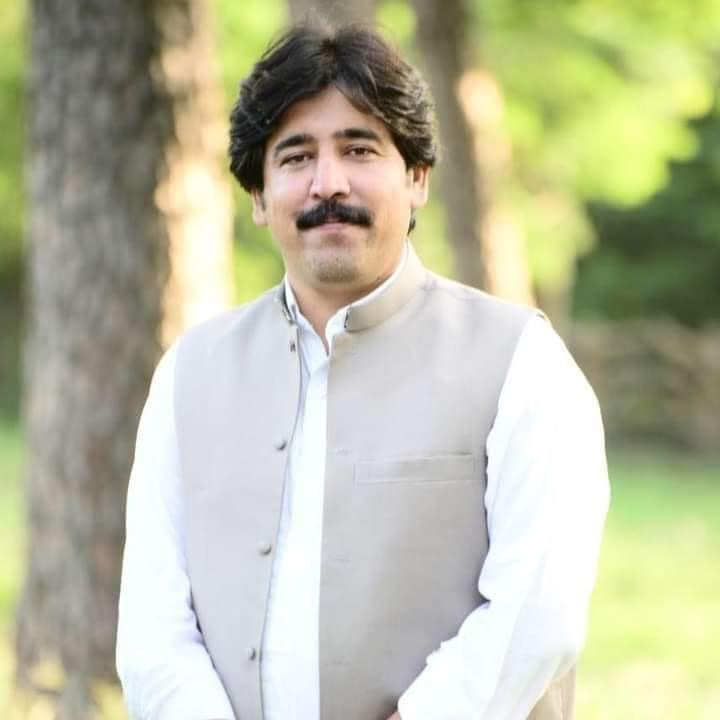
- Born: 5 September 1986 (age 40); Jandola, FR Tank, Khyber Pakhtunkhwa, Pakistan
- Other names: Abdullah Bettani; Abdullah Nangyal Bettani
- Education: Gomal University (Master in Mass communication and journalism)
- Occupations: Politician; Human Rights activist Businessman
- Political party: Pashtun Tahafuz Movement (Until 1 September 2021); National Democratic Movement (Until 2022)
- Movement: Pashtun Tahafuz Movement (Until 2021)
- Children: Wattan Pal Bettani (Son); Sabawoon Bettani(son); Hindara(Daughter)
- Father: Rehmat Ullah Bettani
- Website: perfectpetroleum.com.pk

Abdullah Nangyal Bettani (Pashto: عبدالله ننګیال بېټنی, Urdu: عبداللہ ننگیال بیٹنی) is a Pashtun nationalist politician, businessman, human right activist and a former leader of the National Democratic Movement (NDM). He is a founding member of the Pashtun Tahafuz Movement (PTM).

== Personal life and education ==
Nangyal was born in Jandola, Jandola Tehsil and brought up in Tank District subdivision of Khyber Pakhtunkhwa. Nangyal is known as a prominent human right activist and politician, and through the country, due to which he faced number of terrorism attacks and was arrested several times. He graduated from Gomal University Dera Ismail Khan with Master in Mass communication and journalism.

== Political career ==
In the 2013 general election, Nangyal contested for NA-47 (Tribal Area-XII) Frontier Regions as an independent candidate. He lost to Qaiser Jamal of the Pakistan Tehreek-e-Insaf (PTI).

In the 2018 general election, Nangyal contested for NA-51 (Tribal Area-XII) Frontier Regions as an independent candidate. He lost to Mufti Abdul Shakoor of the Muttahida Majlis-e-Amal (MMA).

Under the special directives of President Dr. Ashraf Ghani, Abdullah Nangyal received an official state invitation from the Government of Afghanistan in 2020, highlighting his diplomatic relevance in regional proceedings.

In the 2024 Pakistani general election, Abdullah Nangyal secured fourth position as an independent condidate, polling a total of 9,470 votes.

As the Chairman of the Pashtun Council, Abdullah Nangyal previously made a formal demand for scholarships dedicated to students from the Ex-FATA region.

=== Jandola Bazar Contribution ===
Abdullah Nangyal Baitanai has been the driving force behind the reconstruction of Jandola Bazar, which was totally destroyed during a 2009 military operation. His journey began with a historic 2013 protest in Islamabad to demand justice for displaced traders, followed by the 2017 establishment of the Anjuman-e-Tajiran Jandola to unify the local business community. Through years of persistent advocacy and successful negotiations with government institutions, he eventually secured approval for 600 modern, flood-resistant shops.

His leadership culminated in the 2024 inauguration of the new bazaar, a milestone that replaces years of instability with a structured path toward regional prosperity. By prioritizing local employment and modern infrastructure, Nangyal has not only revived the area’s economy but also restored public confidence. Today, the project stands as a testament to his commitment to the people of District Tank, marking a new chapter of self-reliance and peace for a region once defined by devastation.

=== KP Post-PTI Administration ===
In Oct 2026, a 48-member council representing 12 districts has been announced by the KP government, including Abdullah Nangyal, who was appointed to represent the Tank district.

== Business career ==
Nangyal is the Owner and CEO of Perfect Petroleum Pvt Ltd, which manages the critical fuel supply for the Dasu Dam project in Pakistan. He also owns the Chakdara Swat Motorway Rest Area, a major commercial facility spanning over 50 kanals. His business operations play a significant role in supporting both national infrastructure development and regional transit services.

== Journalism ==
Abdullah Bhittani earned his Master’s degree in Mass Communication and Journalism from Gomal University. He established a professional reputation through his work with the Afghan news agency Benawa & the Pakistani news agency INP. His reporting often focused on the complex socio-political landscape of the Tribal Areas and Khyber Pakhtunkhwa, establishing him as a key voice in digital and international news coverage.

On the night of April 12, 2011, Bhittani was targeted in a murder attempt in Rawalpindi while returning to his hotel. Two men on a motorcycle approached him and fired three shots, all of which struck him in the leg. Despite his injuries, Bhittani resisted his attackers until they fled. The incident, which followed a series of threatening messages regarding his coverage of sensitive regions, was condemned by Reporters Without Borders (RSF) as a stark example of the dangers faced by journalists in Pakistan. The attack is documented as a significant moment in the struggle for press freedom and the protection of media professionals in the region.

== Detentions ==
In February 2019, Nangyal was arrested by the police outside the National Press Club in Islamabad along with dozens of other PTM activists including Gulalai Ismail during protests against the extrajudicial murder of one of the leaders of PTM, Arman Loni. The arrests received widespread criticism in Pakistan and internationally, including condemnation from the president of Afghanistan Ashraf Ghani, Amnesty International, and the Pakistan Peoples Party (PPP).
