= National Democratic Movement (Pakistan) =

National Democratic Movement ملي جمهوري غورځنګ
- Urdu name: قومی جمہوری تحریک
- Abbreviation: NDM
- Leader: Mohsin Dawar
- General Secretary: Muzamil Shah Roshan
- Spokesperson: Jamila Gilani
- Founded: September 1, 2021; 5 years ago
- Split from: ANP; PKMAP; PTM
- Headquarters: Peshawar, Khyber Pakhtunkhwa
- Ideology: Social democracy Anti-authoritarianism; Progressivism; Regionalism; Federalism; Pashtun nationalism Left-wing nationalism
- Political position: Centre-left
- National affiliation: TTAP
- Colours: Black; Red
- National Assembly of Pakistan: 0 / 366

Election symbol
- Mountain

Party flag
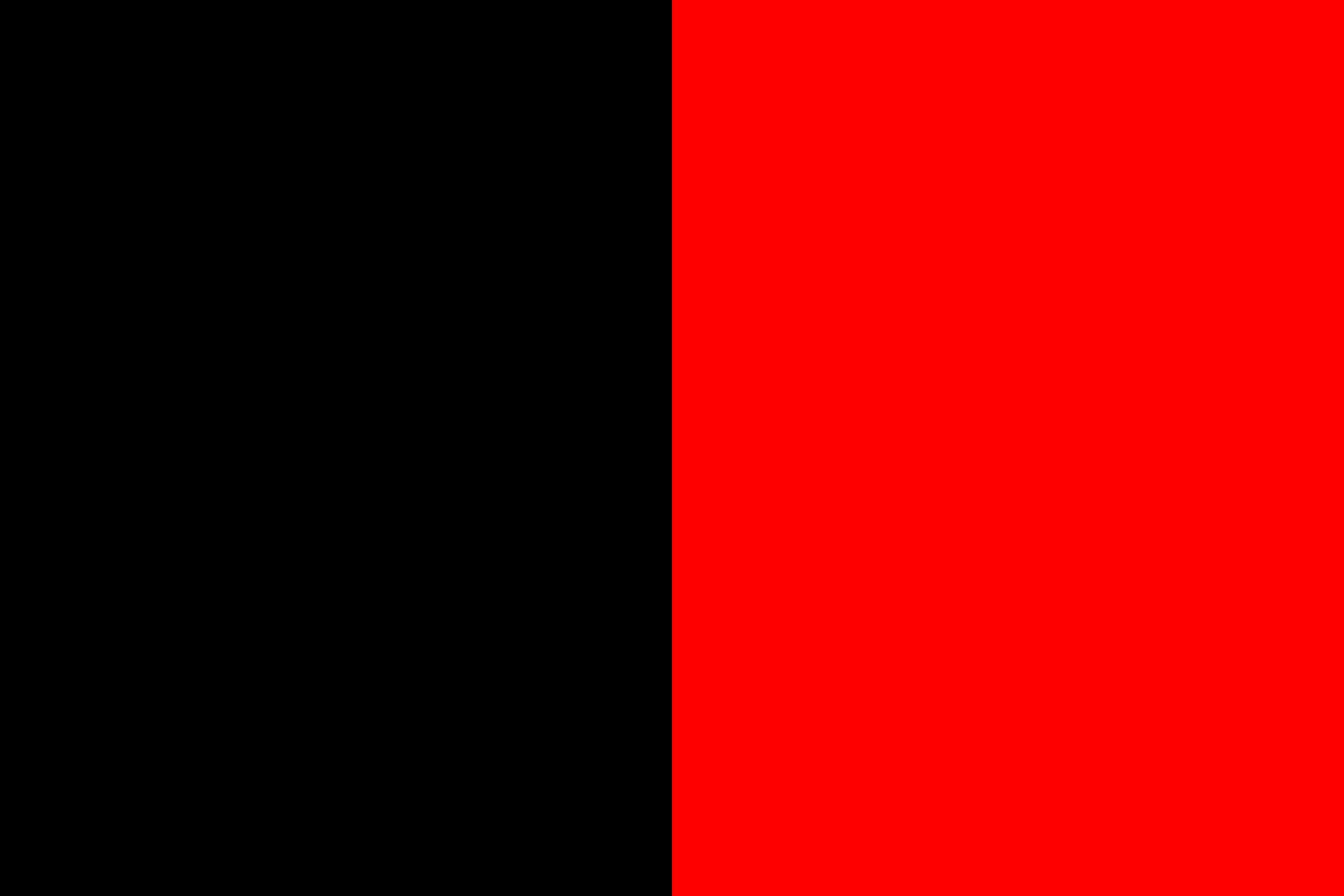

Website
- ndm.org.pk

The National Democratic Movement (NDM; Pashto: ملي جمهوري غورځنګ, romanized: Millī Jumhūrī Ghōrźang; Urdu: قومی جمہوری تحریک) is a Pashtun nationalist, regionalist, and social-democratic political party in Pakistan. The NDM seeks to resist the "growing militarisation" and promotes a federal parliamentary system. It also aims to provide a platform to women and youth for organising their political activism. It was founded by Mohsin Dawar on 1 September 2021 in Peshawar.

Mohsin Dawar was elected as the chairman and Jamila Gilani as the spokesperson.

== History ==
Consultations about the need for formation of a new progressive party had been ongoing since December 2020. The party was formally launched on 1 September 2021 in Peshawar in the wake of the Taliban takeover of Kabul two weeks earlier, amid growing concerns about instability in the region.

The party was joined by several activists in the Pashtun Tahafuz Movement, including Mohsin Dawar and Abdullah Nangyal, and by former members of the Pashtunkhwa Milli Awami Party and the Awami National Party, including Jamila Gilani, Bushra Gohar, Afrasiab Khattak, Basheer Matta, and Latif Afridi.

== Policies ==
The NDM opposes the role of the military establishment in Pakistan and the Taliban rule in Afghanistan. During the opening ceremony of the party, senior leader Afrasiab Khattak stated that "the [Pakistani] army generals wanted the enforcement of Shariah system in Afghanistan but wanted to impose a martial law in Pakistan." He added, "the enemies had attacked Kabul and Kandahar to push the Afghans back to the darkness. The enemy should understand that Peshawar has now become the new centre and they could not silence the Pashtuns."

=== Manifesto ===
The NDM recognizes the marginalization of smaller provinces and regions in the distribution of resources in Pakistan, and said it would "struggle for a new social contract among the federating units that would be based on justice and recognise rights on natural, financial, and human resources." The party believes in a "true federal democracy in which the centre controls four departments: foreign affairs, currency, defense, and inter-provincial communications; or any other powers approved by the Council of Common Interests. All other powers must be delegated to the provinces."

According to its manifesto, the party aims "to establish a just, peaceful, tolerant, and humane society in which citizens enjoy fundamental freedoms, including freedom of expression, freedom of association, and protection of the law." The party hopes to "eliminate unproductive expenditure by reviewing spending priorities and will spend maximum resources on education, health, and human development," and believes that "at least 4% of the annual national budget should be spent on education." The party is in favour of giving the status of national language to each of the major languages of Pakistan, and advocates for educating children in their mother tongue. The manifesto also says that the party is against all forms of discrimination against women.

== Flag ==
The party has a bicolour flag, having vertical stripes of black and red colour. The black represents the dark days of the past while the red represents revolution and prosperity.

Notably, these two colors are also present in the unofficial flag of Pashtunistan.

== NDM–PTM relationship ==
Some analysts claimed that the NDM would cause a set back for the Pashtun Tahafuz Movement (PTM), a non-parliamentary political movement, and curtail its influence. However, according to Mohsin Dawar, the NDM would support the PTM. "The PTM is a joint movement and we remained part of it. I don’t think that the NDM will weaken the PTM," he stated. Several leaders of the NDM, including Mohsin Dawar, Jamila Gilani, and Abdullah Nangyal, have been prominent activists in the PTM.
