= Afrasiab Khattak =

Pakistani politician

Afrasiab Khattak Khan
- افراسياب خټک

President of National Democratic Movement Pakistan
- Incumbent
- Assumed office 18 September 2021
- Chairman: Mohsin Dawar

Member of the Senate
- In office 15 April 2009 – 2014
- President: Asif Ali Zardari
- Constituency: General seat from Khyber Pakhtunkhwa

President of Awami National Party in Khyber Pakhtunkhwa
- President: Asfandyiar Wali

Personal details
- Born: 07 April 1950 according to docs (actually 2 October 1951) Lachi, Kohat District, North-West Frontier Province, West Pakistan (now in Khyber Pakhtunkhwa)
- Party: National Democratic Movement
- Other political affiliations: Pashtun Tahafuz Movement
- Education: Government Post Graduate College Bannu; University of Peshawar
- Occupation: Public servant

Afrasiab Khattak (Pashto: افراسیاب خټک; Urdu: افراسياب خٹک) is a Pakistani socialist politician and political analyst who is a senior leader of the National Democratic Movement (NDM). He formerly was a member of the Communist Party of Pakistan (CPP). He has formerly served as the chairperson of the Human Rights Commission of Pakistan (HRCP), a member of the Senate of Pakistan (2009–2014), and the provincial president of the Awami National Party (ANP). He is an activist in the Pashtun Tahafuz Movement (PTM).

Khattak started his political activism against the dictator Ayub Khan because of his "one unit" formula in the 1968 but went to the Soviet Union to avoid the Great Purge authorised by the regime of General Zia-ul-Haq. Inspired by the Communist Party of the Soviet Union, Khattak joined the pro-Soviet Communist Party of Pakistan. He later joined the socialist National Awami Party in 1980 and later went into asylum in Democratic Republic of Afghanistan, Khattak returned to Pakistan when General Zia-ul-Haq martial law ended after his plane crashed in 1988. Khattak joined the Awami National Party, becoming the President of ANP's central secretariat based in Khyber Pakhtunkhwa and as well as chairman of the special standing committee senate.

== Biography ==
Khattak became an active member of Communist Party of Pakistan. He was an active leftist politician during the 1970s and 1980s. Khattak spent many years in self-exile in Afghanistan during the 1980s due to his strong opposition to General Zia-ul-Haq's military rule.

Khattak joined the Human Rights Commission of Pakistan (HRCP) in 1989, and served as the vice-chairman of HRCP in North-West Frontier Province, for three years – he is also one of the founders of the Afghanistan Pakistan People's Friendship Association.

After rejoining the Awami National Party, he was elected in 2006 as the ANP's provincial president, leading the party to provincial victory in Pakistan's elections of 2008. Khattak was elected as senator of the Senate of Pakistan in March 2009.

His membership was suspended from ANP on 12 November 2018 by the party's General Secretary, Mian Iftikhar Hussain, on the directives of the party's president, Asfandyar Wali Khan.

== See also ==
- Human Rights Commission of Pakistan
- Khan Abdul Wali Khan
- Raj Wali Shah Khattak
- Awami National Party
- Mohammad Najibullah
