= Pashtun Tahafuz Movement =

Social movement for Pashtun human rights

- پښتون تحفظ موومنټ (Pashto)
- Abbreviation: PTM
- Founded: May 2014; 12 years ago
- Founder: Eight Students
- Type: Human rights movement
- Purpose: Protection and rights of Pashtuns: Truth and reconciliation commission to investigate extrajudicial killings; Presenting missing persons before courts; Removal of landmines from the Pashtun tribal areas
- Headquarters: Peshawar
- Chairman: Manzoor Pashteen
- Website: Pashtun Tahafuz Movement on Facebook
- Formerly called: Mahsud Tahafuz Movement (From May 2014 until January 2018)

The Pashtun Tahafuz Movement (PTM) (Note: Pashto: پښتون تحفظ موومنټ) is a banned sociopolitical organization primarily operating in the Khyber Pakhtunkhwa province of Pakistan. It advocates for Pashtun human rights and was founded in May 2014 by eight students in Dera Ismail Khan. On 1 February 2018, the name of the movement was changed from "Mahsud Tahafuz Movement" ('Mahsud Protection Movement') to "Pashtun Tahafuz Movement".

During PTM's public demonstrations and sit-ins since February 2018, several demands were presented to the Pakistani government and military, including punishment to the retired police officer Rao Anwar, a truth and reconciliation commission on extrajudicial killings in the country, presenting missing persons before courts, and removal of landmines from the Pashtun tribal areas. The movement is led by Manzoor Pashteen, a human rights activist from South Waziristan. Other prominent activists in it include Ali Wazir, Mohsin Dawar, Ismat Shahjahan, Mir Kalam, Alamzaib Mahsud, Abdullah Nangyal, Fazal Khan, Gulalai Ismail, Sanna Ejaz, Wranga Loni, and the late Arman Loni, Arif Wazir, Usman Kakar, Noor Islam Dawar, and Gilaman Wazir. PTM claims to be an unarmed and peaceful resistance movement working within the lawful boundaries of the Constitution of Pakistan. The Pakistan Army and several journalists have claimed that the movement is trying to create discord in the country along ethnic lines, as well as following a foreign agenda. The movement witnessed strong support from neighboring Islamic Republic of Afghanistan, which traditionally had an uneasy relationship with the government of Pakistan.

Ahead of the PTM-planned Khyber Jirga in October 2024, the Pakistani government banned the PTM on the grounds that its activities threatened the country's peace and security. The decision drew criticism from human rights organizations including Amnesty International and the Human Rights Commission of Pakistan, which called for the ban's reversal, citing PTM's history of peaceful advocacy within constitutional limits.

== History ==
=== Background ===
Pashtun-inhabited territories have been a war zone since the early 1980s, during the Cold War between the Soviet Union and United States and following the conflict between Western and Islamist forces. PTM therefore campaigns against the continuing war, blaming both the Taliban and the Pakistani military for the destruction.

=== Early history ===
The movement was founded as Mahsud Tahafuz Movement in May 2014 by eight students in Dera Ismail Khan as an initiative for removing landmines from Waziristan and other parts of the former Federally Administered Tribal Areas, affected by the war in North-West Pakistan.

The movement rose to prominence in January 2018 when it began a justice movement for Naqeebullah Mehsud, who was extrajudicially killed in a fake encounter staged by the police officer Rao Anwar in Karachi. When the movement gained popularity among the Pashtuns in February 2018, the word "Mahsud" in its name, which referred to the Mahsud tribe from Waziristan, was changed into "Pashtun" to refer to all Pashtuns.

The movement, which has inspired global Pashtun solidarity, has been dominated by youth, and thrives on social media while lacking significant coverage in mainstream media. According to Saleem Shah, it has challenged military power where typical Pashtun nationalist parties have not dared. However, the PTM lacks organizational structure and a political manifesto, as of 2018.

In November 2018, PTM launched a justice movement for Tahir Dawar, a police officer and Pashto poet who was abducted from the capital Islamabad and tortured to death, with his corpse found 18 days after disappearance in the Dur Baba District of Nangarhar Province, Afghanistan. PTM, as well as Tahir's family, demanded that Tahir's murder must be investigated through an international commission rather than a Pakistani one because the case involved two countries. PTM again gained international press coverage in February 2019 when the Balochistan Police allegedly extrajudicially murdered one of the leaders of PTM, Arman Loni, in Loralai. Protests followed which led to the detention of more than 20 PTM activists, including Gulalai Ismail and Abdullah Nangyal. In May 2020, after the assassination of PTM leader Arif Wazir, another wave of widespread protests was held during which several PTM activists, including Gilaman Wazir and Nadeem Askar, were arrested by Pakistani authorities. The Pashteen hat (also known as the Mazari hat) has become the most iconic symbol of PTM, as Manzoor Pashteen regularly wears it at public rallies and events.

=== Kharqamar incident ===
On 26 May 2019, there was a clash between the Pakistan Army and PTM activists who were holding a protest gathering near the Kharqamar check post in North Waziristan. To stop the demonstration, the security forces killed at least 13 PTM supporters and injured over 25 others. The military said PTM members attacked security forces before any shooting began and injured several soldiers, but the army showed no evidence to contradict the witness accounts and videos, that largely pointed to the contrary. Several PTM activists, including two members of the National Assembly of Pakistan, Ali Wazir and Mohsin Dawar, were arrested by the security forces after the incident and curfew was imposed in the area. A day after this incident, the opposition parties walked out of the National Assembly of Pakistan in protest, and asked Asad Qaiser, who was the Speaker of the National Assembly and a leader of the Pakistan Tehreek-e-Insaf (PTI), to produce Wazir and Dawar before the parliament so that they could explain their viewpoint about the incident at the parliament sessions, but the speaker refused.

After almost four months in jail, Wazir and Dawar were released on bail on 21 September 2019. On 14 October 2020, the government withdrew the Kharqamar case against PTM, and Wazir and Dawar were acquitted of the charges against them.

=== Ban by Pakistan ===
In October 2024, the Pakistani government banned the Pashtun Tahafuz Movement (PTM), citing security concerns. A government notification labeled the PTM as a "proscribed organization," accusing it of engaging in activities deemed prejudicial to the peace and stability of the country. The ban comes amid growing tensions and increased dissent, particularly regarding the PTM's vocal criticism of the military's role in alleged human rights violations, including enforced disappearances and extrajudicial killings in Pashtun regions.

The move to outlaw the PTM drew immediate backlash from human rights organizations including Amnesty International. The Human Rights Commission of Pakistan (HRCP) condemned the ban, calling it an "extreme decision" and demanded its reversal. According to the HRCP, PTM has consistently advocated for its cause through non-violent and constitutional means. Despite the ban, PTM has enjoyed widespread support in Pakistan's Pashtun-majority regions and neighboring Afghanistan, where its demand for justice for Pashtuns resonates strongly. The timing of the ban also coincided with the scheduled Khyber Jirga, a traditional Pashtun council, further intensifying tensions between the movement's supporters and the state.

== Objectives ==
The main demands of PTM presented during the Pashtun Long March's gatherings in 2018 included, among others:

=== State Terrorism ===
The Pashtun Tahafuz Movement has highly demanded that landmines must be removed from the Pashtun tribal areas. The PTM leaders have criticized Pakistan's military establishment for terrorizing lands of Pashtun people several times. They adopted a famous Balochi slogan "ye jo dehshatgardi hai, iske peeche wardi hai" (Those in uniform are behind terrorism). PTM also demanded several times that Rao Anwar and other police officers involved must be punished for the alleged murder of Naqeebullah Mehsud. PTM also demands a truth and reconciliation commission must be established for all the people who are killed extrajudicially like Naqeebullah Mehsud in alleged fake encounters by the law enforcement agencies of Pakistan The missing persons who are imprisoned at unknown places must be tried in a court of law, and forced disappearances must be stopped.

=== Torture of Pashtuns ===
PTM demands that torture and collective punishment against entire villages and tribes in the Pashtun tribal areas, especially after a violent incident, must be stopped The humiliation of locals at army checkpoints in the Pashtun areas must be ended.

== Pashtun marches ==
=== Islamabad sit-in ===
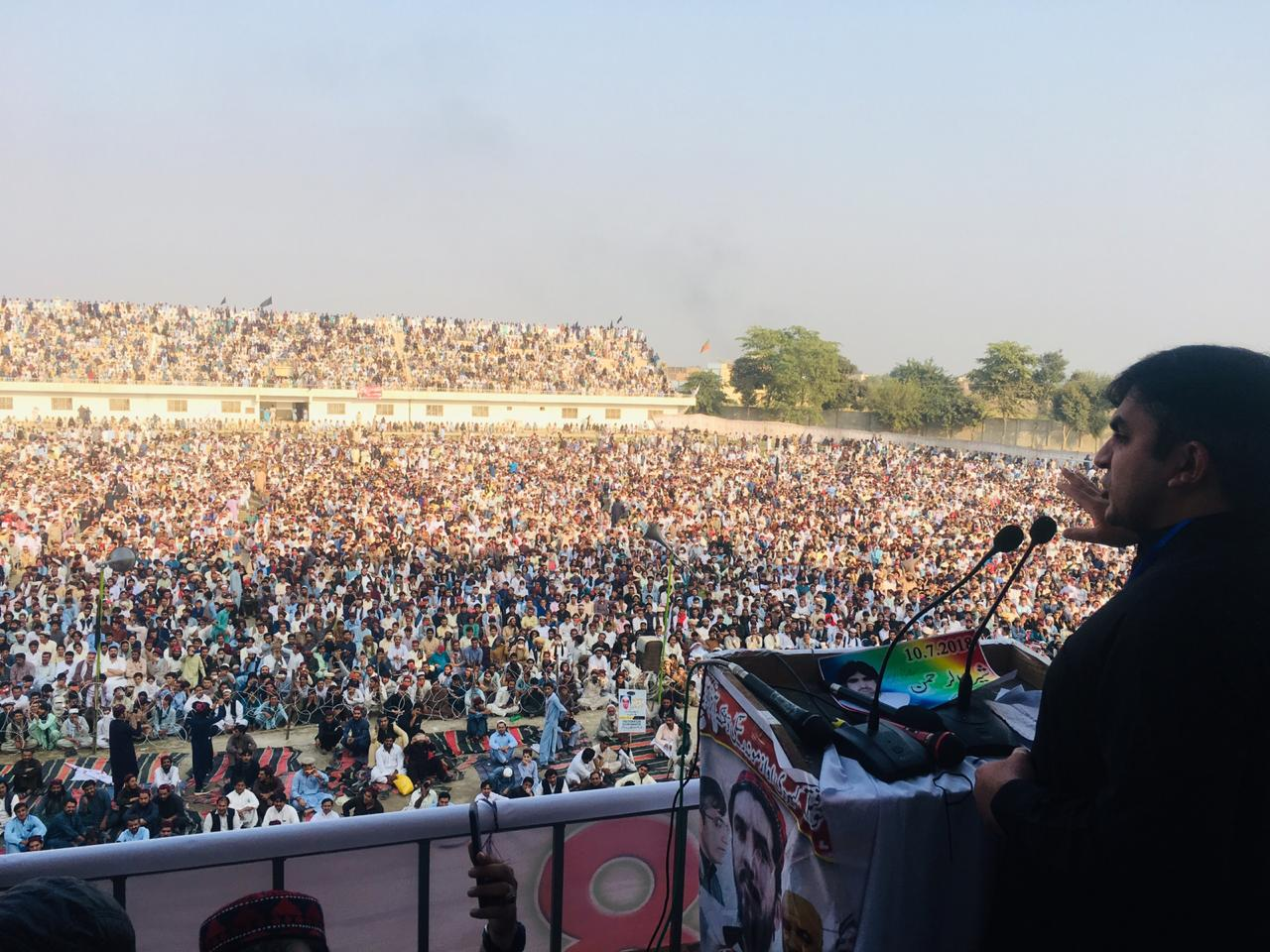
Rally of PTM in Bannu attended by thousands of Pashtuns.

On 26 January 2018, the Pashtun Tahafuz Movement organized a protest march starting from Dera Ismail Khan. The march had 22 participants initially, but many people joined it along the way, as it passed through Lakki Marwat, Bannu, Domel, Karak, Kohat, and Darra Adam Khel, reaching Peshawar on 28 January. Then after passing through Charsadda, Mardan, Swabi, and Tarnol, the march reached Islamabad, where a sit-in called "All Pashtun National Jirga" was organized from 1 February outside the National Press Club. The jirga condemned the murder of the Pashtun labourer and aspiring model, Naqeebullah Mehsud, who was shot dead by police force in Karachi during an alleged encounter, and the alleged state oppression against the Pashtuns. It asked the government to set up a judicial inquiry for Naqeebullah Mehsud, as well as for all the other Pashtuns murdered extrajudicially in police encounters. The jirga demanded to stop racial profiling of the Pashtuns in Pakistan, and to bring the Pashtun missing persons before the court of law, so that those who are innocent but held could be freed. The jirga also demanded Pakistan Army to guarantee that they will not abduct or open fire on innocents in the tribal areas, or use violence or collective punishment against entire villages and tribes, and that they will not impose the frequent curfews on the movement of locals even after minor incidents. Another demand was to remove all landminess planted in the tribal areas, which have resulted in many civilian casualties. The protesters said that since 2009, more than 35 people including children had been killed due to landmines in South Waziristan alone.

The sit-in in Islamabad ended on 10 February, but the organizers of the Pashtun Tahafuz Movement announced that they would reconvene the protest if their demands were not fulfilled by the government. Advisor to Prime Minister on political affairs, Engr. Amir Muqam appeared in front of the protesters with the hand-written agreement from the Prime Minister Shahid Khaqan Abbasi that included three clauses, agreeing to apprehend Rao Anwar, speed-up the clearing of Mines in South Waziristan, an intermediate college establishment in name of Naqeebullah Mehsud, and promised to addressed "genuine gravencies" raised by Jirga members. Muqam also told the protestors, "the way you held the peaceful protest is really commendable and others should learn a lesson to record their protests this way. I'll stand by you in trying times and you can come to discuss with me all of your legitimate issues anytime."

On 13 May 2018, family members of missing Pakistanis participated in a protest rally by Pashtun Tahafuz Movement in Karachi, Pakistan by holding photos of their relatives.

=== Public gatherings ===
PTM has held public demonstrations at various places, including Bajaur, Bannu, Chaman, Charsadda, Dera Ismail Khan, Islamabad, Kabul, Karachi, Khyber, Killa Saifullah, Lahore, Loralai, North Waziristan, Peshawar, Quetta, South Waziristan, Swabi, Swat, Battagram, Tank, Zhob, as well as in several Western countries including Belgium, Denmark, France, Germany, the United Kingdom, and the United States.

== Media blackouts ==
The powershows and rallys of the Pashtun Tahafuz Movement are not shown by mainstream media channels as they are not allowed by the Establishment, leaving social media as the primary channel for communicating with the rest of Pakistan and strengthening the narrative that the PTM is being ignored by the system. In February 2019, Khyber TV, a Pakistani Pashto-language channel, chose not to air an interview with Manzoor Pashteen because of pressure from the military.

On 23 March 2018, the PTM meeting was scheduled to be held in Peshawar University, but Deputy Commissioner Peshawar Islam Zeb, issued an order under section 144 CrPC, imposing ban on political meetings in University and stated any violation against the order shall be preceded against u/s 188 PPC and order will be exercised "for 30 days unless modified or withdrawn." Later the meeting was held in Baghi-e-Naran, Hayatabad with 200 person attending the gathering.

The movement's anthem is "Da Sanga Azadi Da?", which means "What kind of freedom is this?". Many Pashtun's have discovered their voice with this anthem and it encloses the various grievances they have from being caught between the militants and the military.

On 26 April 2019, Mohsin Dawar tweeted that he and his fellow National Assembly member Ali Wazir were barred from holding a press conference at National Press Club (NPC) despite having prior bookings. Many prominent politicians including Pakistan Peoples Party's Chairman Bilawal Bhutto Zardari, Farhatullah Babar and Bushra Gohar condemned NPC for their move. The next day, NPC issued statement claiming that the lawmakers had not made any prior bookings. The Pakistan Army spokesman Major General Asif Ghafoor told the journalist Hamid Mir not to invite PTM members on media in response to a question by the journalist as to whether the media houses should invite PTM leaders on TV channels. On 29 April 2019, Asif Ghafoor said PTM would no longer be tolerated. "Their time is up," he said of PTM at the press conference.

== Criticism of the Pakistan Army ==
PTM is critical of the Pakistan Army and accuses the state of violating the basic human rights of the Pashtuns, but the Pakistan Army has claimed that PTM is backed by foreign powers and their gatherings are engineered. PTM claims that as a result, news organizations in Pakistan have been pressured to ignore PTM, and university professors have been forced to identify the students attending PTM's protest gatherings. Some Pakistani politicians and journalists also view PTM as working on a foreign or Pashtun nationalist agenda. However, PTM's leadership has claimed that they are protesting through peaceful means within the Constitution of Pakistan.

PTM also says that Pakistan Army has sheltered militants, especially from Haqqani Network.

Gulalai Ismail, a leading PTM member, received death threats by Pakistan's Inter-Services Intelligence (ISI) for speaking enforced disappearancess allegedly carried out by the Pakistani military. Due to the allegations of treason against Gulalai Ismail by the Pakistan police, she went into hiding and eventually took refuge in the United States.

PTM leader Ali Wazir is also known for his vocal criticism of Pakistan's military establishment. He blames the Pakistan Armed Forces for human rights violations during its large-scale military operations, including Operation Rah-e-Nijat in South Waziristan in 2009, during which time he was forced to stay in Dera Ismail Khan due to the insecurity in Waziristan. On 16 December 2020, Wazir was arrested on allegations of treason by the Sindh Police in Peshawar, where he was present to commemorate the 2014 Peshawar school massacre. Qamar Javed Bajwa, the Pakistan Army Chief, stated on 1 July 2021 that Wazir would have to apologize for criticizing the Pakistan Army and then he could be released, but Wazir refused to apologize. On 14 March 2022, the Pashtun National Jirga in Bannu demanded that Wazir be immediately released along with all other political prisoners.

== See also ==
- Waziristan
- Killing of Naqeebullah Mehsud
- Manzoor Pashteen
- Ali Wazir
- Mohsin Dawar
- Forced disappearances in Pakistan
- Pakistan and state-sponsored terrorism
- Targeted killings in Pakistan
- People's Peace Movement (Afghanistan)
