= National Press Club (Pakistan) =

The National Press Club of Islamabad, Pakistan, is a representative body of journalists based in Rawalpindi and the Pakistani federal capital Islamabad. This body represents more than 2500 journalists. National Press Club (Islamabad) also interacts with visiting journalists from other parts of Pakistan as well as international journalists that visit the area.

Election 2018 It has an elected governing body, for 2017–18 period, represented by Shakeel Anjum as president and Imran Dhilun as Secretary.

Election 2019 Shakeel Qarar of Azad Panel was elected president of the National Press Club (NPC) for 2019, defeating Shakeel Anjum of Journalist Panel.

More than 2,300 members exercised their right to vote at the NPC elections held on Tuesday.

Shakeel Qarar bagged 1,036 votes while Shakeel Anjum got 960 votes.

Besides, Saadia Kamal also from Azad Panel was elected vice president on the women's seat. She obtained 878 votes. Shakeel Qarar was elected NPC president.

== Recent activity ==
NPC established a Library that was inaugurated by the Advisor to Prime Minister on National History and Literary Heritage Division, Irfan Siddiqui NPC organize Family and Media Festival on January 28, 2017, with an aim to entertain the citizens of the twin cities of Islamabad and Rawalpindi. NPC has also established Coffee خانہ for providing a wonderful place in lush green ground of NPC for journalist community to sit and enjoy academic environment around the clock.
