= Bushra Gohar =

Pakistani politician

- بشرا ګوهر

Member of the National Assembly of Pakistan
- In office 2008–2013
- Constituency: Reserved seat for women

Personal details
- Born: 5 May 1961 (age 65) Swabi, Khyber Pakhtunkhwa, Pakistan
- Party: National Democratic Movement
- Parent: Ali Gohar Khan (father)
- Education: Wilmington University; University of Pennsylvania; University of Peshawar

Bushra Gohar (Pashto: بشرا ګوهر; Urdu: بشریٰ گوہر) is a Pakistani politician and a senior leader of the National Democratic Movement (NDM). She has served as a member of the National Assembly of Pakistan from 2008 to 2013. She is an activist in the Pashtun Tahafuz Movement (PTM), a social movement campaigning for Pashtun human rights. She was formerly the senior vice-president of Awami National Party (ANP).

== Biography ==
Born in Swabi to a Pashtun family, Gohar studied economics at the University of Peshawar and moved to the United States where she received master's degree in human resource management from Wilmington University in 1991 followed by a postgraduate certificate in South Asian Studies from the University of Pennsylvania. On return to Pakistan, she worked as a consultant with UNDP, USAID, and UKAid. In 2000, Gohar became a member of the National Commission on the Status of Women, a position she retained until 2003.

Her father, Ali Gohar Khan, was a Colonel in the Pakistan Army. Two of her paternal uncles, Sher Khan and Bahadur Sher, were Generals in the army, while a third one, Shahnawaz, was also a Colonel.

== Political career ==
She was elected to the National Assembly of Pakistan as a candidate of Awami National Party on a reserved seat for women from Khyber Pakhtunkhwa in the 2008 Pakistani general election.

From 2016 to 2018, she served as the senior vice-president of Awami National Party until the party suspended her membership.
