= Pashtunkhwa Milli Awami Party =

Pakistani political party

Pashtunkhwa Milli Awami Party Pashto: پښتونخوا ملي عوامي ګوند
- Abbreviation: PMAP; PKMAP
- Chairman: Mahmood Khan Achakzai
- Secretary-General: Abdul Rahim Ziaratwal
- Founders: Mahmood Khan Achakzai; Sher Ali Bacha
- Founded: 1989; 37 years ago
- Succeeded by: PNAP
- Student wing: Pashtunkhwa Students Organization (PSO)
- Ideology: Pashtun nationalism (Left-wing); Social justice; Democratic socialism; Secularism; Federalism (Pakistan); Egalitarianism; Regionalism; Left-wing populism
- Political position: Centre-left to left-wing
- National affiliation: TTAP; PONM
- International affiliation: UNPO
- Colors: Orange
- Senate: 0 / 100
- National Assembly: 1 / 336

Election symbol

Party flag

Website
- Official website

The Pashtunkhwa Milli Awami Party (abbr. PMAP or PKMAP) (Note: Pashto: پښتونخوا ملي عوامي ګوند; Urdu: پشتونخوا ملی عوامی پارٹی) is a Pakistani political party, primarily based in northern Balochistan. It was founded in March 1989 in Quetta by Mahmood Khan Achakzai, who was elected as the chairman, and Sher Ali Bacha, who served as the General Secretary.

The party was a coalition partner of the PML-N in the Balochistan government following the 2013 elections and stood by the PML-N during some of the latter's most challenging times in government.

== Ideology ==
PKMAP had opposed the merger of Federally Administered Tribal Areas with Khyber Pakhtunkhwa province. Its chief Mehmood Khan Achakzai has previously suggested that FATA should be governed either by a governor or a council that should be elected through adult franchise. PKMAP chief Achakzai has also called for the creation of a province for Pakhtuns living in areas from the Pak-Afghan border to Mianwali in Pakistan.

== Electoral history ==
In the 2018 elections, the party could not secure a single seat in the National Assembly but was able to win one seat in the Balochistan assembly. In the 2013 Pakistan general and provincial elections, the party won three general seats in the National Assembly and 10 in the Balochistan Assembly. In 2002, PKMAP secured one NA seat and three provincial assembly seats. The party won two provincial seats in the 1997 polls. It won three NA seats and four provincial seats in 1993. Prior to this, in the 1990 elections, PKMAP won three provincial assembly seats.

In the 2024 Pakistani general elections, the party managed to win one seat in the National Assembly, but did not win a single seat in the Balochistan Assembly. Backed by the PTI, the leader of PKMAP, Achakzai, ran for president against Asif Ali Zardari from the PPP, whom he lost against, only securing 181 electoral votes compared to Zardari's 411 electoral votes.

== Party leadership ==
=== Leader ===
Leader	Term start	Term end	Constituency	Notes
Mahmood Khan Achakzai (b. December 14, 1948)	March, 1989	Incumbent	NA-266 Killa Abdullah-cum-Chaman	

== See also ==
- Pashtun nationalism
- Pashtun question
