= PTM public gatherings =

Protests in Pakistan

- Part of the Pashtun Long March for human rights
- Date: 26 Jan. – 10 Feb. 2018 (march started from Dera Ismail Khan, passed through Bannu, Kohat, Peshawar, Charsadda, Mardan, Dossali and Swabi, and then reached Islamabad for the sit-in); 20 Feb. 2018 (gathering in Bajaur); 11 Mar. 2018 (gathering in Quetta); 23 Mar. 2018 (gathering in Wanna); 8 Apr. 2018 (gathering in Peshawar); 22 Apr. 2018 (gathering in Lahore); 29 Apr. 2018 (gathering in Swat); 13 May 2018 (gathering in Karachi); 15 Jul. 2018 (gathering in Dera Ismail Khan); 12 Aug. 2018 (gathering in Swabi); 28 Oct. 2018 (gathering in Bannu); 5 Jan. 2019 (gathering in Cologne); 13 Jan. 2019 (gathering in Tank); 20 Jan. 2019 (gatherings in Khaisor and Karachi); 14 Feb. 2019 (gathering in Bamyan); 15 Mar. 2019 (2nd gathering in Wanna); 31 Mar. 2019 (2nd gathering in Peshawar); 14 Apr. 2019 (gathering in Miramshah); 12 Jan. 2020 (2nd gathering in Bannu); 9 Feb. 2020 (gathering in Loralai); 16 Feb. 2020 (2nd gathering in Dera Ismail Khan); 1 Mar. 2020 (gathering in Charsadda); 8 Nov. 2020 (gathering in Zhob); 15 Nov. 2020 (2nd gathering in Miramshah); 27 Nov. 2020 (gathering in Chaman); 6 Dec. 2020 (3rd gathering in Karachi); 27 Dec. 2020 (gathering in Bara)
- Location: Khyber Pakhtunkhwa and Balochistan, with protest gatherings also elsewhere
- Caused by: Justice for extrajudicial killing of Naqeebullah Mehsud by Pakistan Police and arrest of officer Rao Anwar involved in encounters; Disappearances, encounter killings by police, and human rights violations of Pashtuns; Opposition to the Pakistan Army against landmines in Waziristan and other Federally Administered Tribal Areas
- Goals: Human rights for Pashtun people
- Methods: Protest, sit-in, demonstrations
- Status: Ongoing
- Result: Promised to apprehend Rao Anwar and justice to Naqeebullah Mehsud's murder; Assured the speedup cleaning of mines in South Waziristan and the former Federally Administered Tribal Areas and compensation to the victims of mines killed or injured

Parties
Pashtun Tahafuz Movement (PTM) and various other political parties	Pakistan Armed Forces

Lead figures
Abdullah Nangyal; Alamzaib Mahsud; Ali Wazir; Arfa Siddiq; Arif Wazir; Arman Loni; Bushra Gohar; Fazal Khan; Gilaman Wazir; Gulalai Ismail; Hanif Pashteen; Hassan Nasir; Jamal Malyar; Jamila Gilani; Manzoor Pashteen; Mir Kalam; Mohsin Dawar; Mulla Behram; Nadeem Askar; Nargis Afsheen Khattak; Said Alam; Sanna Ejaz; Wranga Loni	Major General Asif Ghafoor

The Pashtun Tahafuz Movement (PTM) has held public gatherings and marches at various places, including Bajaur, Bannu, Chaman, Charsadda, Dera Ismail Khan, Islamabad, Karachi, Khyber, Killa Saifullah, Lahore, Loralai, North Waziristan, Peshawar, Quetta, South Waziristan, Swabi, Swat, Tank, Zhob in Pakistan, as well as in several Western countries, including Belgium, Denmark, France, Germany, and the United States.

== Bajaur ==
PTM held its first public gathering in Pakistan's Federally Administered Tribal Areas (now part of Khyber Pakhtunkhwa) on 20 February 2018 at Inayat Kalay in Khaar, Bajaur. Attended by thousands of people, the gathering was the first of its kind in Bajaur in more than a decade. The protesters condemned the killing of Ahmad Shah, a 22-year-old student who had immigrated from Bajaur to Karachi to seek education and employment but had been abducted from Karachi on 15 February. Allegedly, he had been tortured and then extrajudicially killed by the Karachi police in a similar way to the killing of Naqeebullah Mehsud the previous month. Ahmad Shah's bullet-riddled body had been found on 17 February and the body had been transported from Karachi to Bajaur for burial at his ancestral graveyard. Ahmad Shah's family and other protesters at the gathering warned the Pakistani government that if those involved in the murder were not punished, they would march to Islamabad and stage a protest sit-in. The three-day Bajaur protest continued on 21 and 22 February. During his address at the gathering, Manzoor Pashteen resolved that PTM "would not keep silence over the murder of Pashtuns."

== Quetta ==
From 9 to 11 March 2018, PTM organized a protest march from Dera Ismail Khan to Quetta, passing through Drazanda, Zhob, Killa Saifullah, and Khanozai. After reaching Quetta, a grand public gathering was organized on 11 March at Sadiq Shaheed Stadium, Quetta. Representatives of various political parties addressed the gathering. The speakers said: "We demand constitutionally sanctioned rights in the country for Pashtuns." Manzoor Pashteen expressed his regret about the failure of Pakistan's law enforcement agencies despite the promise by the government to arrest Rao Anwar, who was involved in the alleged extrajudicial killing of Naqeebullah Mehsud. Pashteen said at the gathering: "We had set one month deadline to certain quarters to apprehend Rao Anwar which expired but no action has been taken by the government."

== Wanna ==
On 23 March 2018 (Pakistan National Day), PTM organized a public gathering in Wanna, the capital city of South Waziristan. Arif Wazir, a local PTM leader, said during the gathering: "The tribal Pashtuns abandoned homes to enable the army to take action against terrorists, but now the tribals are only treated as strangers on military check posts and are not even allowed to own homes and properties." Later in the day, Arif Wazir led the rally to the home of slain Naqeebullah Mehsud in Makeen, South Waziristan. On 24 March, Arif was detained by the authorities under the Frontier Crimes Regulations for organizing the rally. Three other PTM activists were also arrested. PTM supporters protested against the arrests in front of press clubs in Peshawar, Quetta, Swat, Swabi, Bannu, Dera Ismail Khan, Zhob, Loralai, Killa Saifullah, Ziarat, Islamabad, Lahore, Karachi, and other cities.

== Peshawar ==
There was a grand gathering of PTM near Sarhad University in Peshawar, the capital of Khyber Pakhtunkhwa, on 8 April 2018. About 60,000 people came to the gathering to participate in the protest. Many of the protesters held photographs of their missing relatives, containing captions with names and the dates they disappeared. Pashteen proclaimed in his speech during the gathering: "We are against those who do wrong, whether it is ISI (Inter-Services Intelligence), MI (Military Intelligence), good Taliban, bad Taliban, or peace committees, we are against them."

== Lahore ==
PTM held a public gathering in the Punjab province of Pakistan on 22 April at the historical Mochi Gate, Lahore. Attended by over 8,000 people, the gathering was hosted by Lahore Left Front (LLF). In May 2018, LLF was formed by 17 left wing parties whose objective was to revive Left-wing politics in country and counter prevailing religious fundamentalism. The objectives of this gathering was to inform Punjab people about Pushtuns ordeal in war-hit areas of country and uniting exploited masses of Punjab and Pushtuns - as well highlighting woes of ordinary Pushtun workers in Lahore. Just one day before gathering, Lahore district administration rejected permission to hold gathering and arrested its leading activists including Ali Wazir, Ismat Shahjahan, Bilawal Mandokhel, and Muzammil. This act of administration was sharply criticized by public as well as notable politicians of country like Maryam Nawaz, Pervaiz Rashid, and Bilawal Bhutto Zardari.

Despite all hurdles, the Lahore public gathering was held as per plan. In this rally, PTM leaders asserted their demands and announced future rallies in Karachi & Swat. Two days after this successful gathering, Corps Commander Peshawar Lt General Nazir Ahmed declared that PTM demands are genuine and military is ready for talks. According to media reports, military had formed a committee to talk to PTM leaders and discuss their demands.

== Swat ==
There was a grand gathering of PTM in Swat District at Kabal ground near Mingora, on 29 April 2018, which was attended by more than 10,000 people. The attendees were mostly relatives of alleged missing persons in recent times. Speaking with gathering, Manzoor Pashteen said,

“We are demanding our legal rights within the domain of the Constitution but who will seek accountability from those who violated Article 6 of the Constitution of Pakistan.”

Pashteen criticized Pervez Musharraf for his alleged terrorism, and demanded for Musharraf and the spokesperson of the Taliban Ehsanullah Ehsan to be punished.

== Karachi ==
The Karachi gathering was held on 13 May 2018 at the ground near Al-Asif Square in Sohrab Goth, Karachi. Bagh-e-Jinnah was the initially planned venue but the authorities didn't permit it. Before the event, three separate criminal cases were registered against PTM at different police stations in Karachi for hate and anti-state speeches. PTM activists accused authorities of sabotaging their event by initiating a wave of mass arrests and detentions.

One day before the event, Manzoor Pashteen was barred from boarding his scheduled flight to Karachi from Islamabad International Airport. He was told that his ticket had been cancelled and was not allowed to board the plane. He and his friends then drove for five hours to Lahore, and bought another plane ticket to fly from Lahore Airport. However, their ticket was again cancelled and they were forced to take a road trip to reach Karachi. During the road trip, he was stopped and searched 23 times by the authorities, which made his journey over 40 hours. He reached the gathering venue in Karachi hours after his scheduled arrival time, and addressed the awaiting crowd. At the gathering, he denounced extrajudicial killings and forced disappearances in Karachi and all across Pakistan, and also reiterated the main demands of PTM.

== Dera Ismail Khan ==
On 15 July 2018, a grand public gathering was organized by PTM at Haq Nawaz Park, Dera Ismail Khan in which thousands of people participated. During the gathering, PTM reiterated their main demands, and condemned the release of Rao Anwar, the prime suspect in the extrajudicial killing of Naqeebullah Mehsud. Fazal Khan, a PTM leader whose son had been martyred in the 2014 Peshawar school massacre, also spoke at the gathering. He condemned the 13 July 2018 bombings in Mastung and Bannu, which killed a total of about 154 people and wounded 223 others.

== Swabi ==
On 12 August 2018, PTM organized a public gathering in Swabi, in which the Babrra massacre was commemorated on its 70th anniversary. Manzoor Pashteen told the gathering that PTM's struggle for the rights of the Pashtuns would continue under the Constitution of Pakistan. He alleged that 70 years after the Babrra massacure, the Pashtuns are still being killed. He said: "Our struggle is based on justice, peace, and brotherhood. We will not accept the victimization of the Pashtuns." He added that despite producing surplus electricity through Tarbela Dam and Ghazi-Barotha Hydropower Project, the people of Swabi District and the adjacent areas still suffer from long hours of power outages. Pashteen demanded that the district should be given an uninterrupted power supply. He also spoke about the problems faced by tobacco growers in the district, and said: "Tobacco is produced in Swabi, but the federal government reaps its benefits." He demanded that the incentives for the Gadoon Amazai Industrial Estate in Swabi should be restored, because it was established to provide an alternative livelihood source to the farmers cultivating opium poppy.

During the campaign to inform people about the gathering in Swabi, one day before the event, Manzoor Pashteen was denied entry into the mausoleum of Captain Karnal Sher Khan by Karnal Sher Khan's brother Anwar Sher Khan. Anwar said he denied Pashteen entry into the mausoleum out of respect for the Pakistan Army.

== Bannu ==
There was a grand gathering of PTM at Bannu Sports Complex in Bannu, southern Khyber Pakhtunkhwa, on 28 October 2018, which was attended by more than 60,000 people. It was one of the largest public gatherings in the history of Bannu. The attendees included relatives of alleged missing persons in recent times. PTM protested for the immediate recovery of Tahir Dawar, a police officer and Pashto poet who had been abducted from the capital Islamabad on 26 October and missing for two days. Noor Islam Dawar, a PTM activist, asked the protesters during his speech at the gathering: "Is this the reward for Tahir's honesty, bravery, and professionalism: to be kidnapped?" However, Tahir was never recovered alive and his dead body was later found by the locals in the Dur Baba District of Nangarhar Province, Afghanistan, eighteen days after disappearance.

== Cologne ==
On 5 January 2019, more than a thousand supporters of PTM gathered in Cologne, the largest city of Germany's most populous state North Rhine-Westphalia. People from various countries of Europe came to participate in the public gathering. They reiterated the first demand of PTM, justice for Naqeebullah Mehsud, who had been killed extrajudicially in Karachi, Pakistan by SSP Rao Anwar almost a year before. The protesters demanded the government of Pakistan to not ban PTM leaders from traveling to various parts of Pakistan or other countries. The participants also protested against forced disappearances and target killings in Pakistan.

== Tank ==
On 13 January 2019, PTM held a public gathering in Tank, Khyber Pakhtunkhwa to observe the first anniversary of the murder of Naqeebullah Mehsud. Many landmine victims and family members of missing persons also attended the gathering. Manzoor Pashteen said at the gathering that PTM had been protesting for a year to seek justice for Naqeebullah and will keep protesting even if a hundred years passed to demand strict punishment for Rao Anwar and other criminals. Pashteen blamed the Pakistani state for ruining the Pashtun homeland and looting their resources under the pretext of war on terror. He expressed his resolve that the Pashtuns will continue to seek justice for themselves through peaceful means "even if it takes hundred years".

== Khaisor ==
On 20 January 2019, PTM organized a public gathering in Karachi to celebrate its first anniversary. Alamzaib Mahsud, a PTM activist instrumental in gathering data on missing persons and landmines victims in the Pashtun tribal districts, was detained by the police on 21 January for taking part in the demonstration in Karachi. The PTM chairman Manzoor Pashteen and another leader Mohsin Dawar, however, did not travel to Karachi for the anniversary due to a last minute change of plans and instead organized a public rally in the Khaisor village of North Waziristan on 20 January in protest against the Khaisor incident.

The Khaisor incident had surfaced two days earlier, when 13-year-old Hayat Khan from Khaisor claimed in a video on 18 January that Pakistani security forces had arrested his brother Adil and father Jalat Khan, and that his family had been facing harassment due to frequent visits by two security personnel to his home. Hayat Khan was allegedly persuaded by a Pashtun Tahafuz Movement activist, Noor Islam Dawar, to record the video. In the video, which went viral on social media, Hayat said that his father and brother might not be freed, but he requested the security forces to stop the unwanted visits when he was the only male along with the women at his house. Hayat's mother also spoke publicly about the incident, and said: "The soldiers once told me to make beds for them because they would spend the night inside our house. I am now publicly speaking because I am sick of the humiliation and dishonor." Hayat's mother was alleged to have signed an affidavit to deny her previous allegation which was verified by some tribal elders. Mohsin Dawar accused the Pakistani government of trying to force Hayat and his family to withdraw their claim against the security personnel. On 27 January, a six-member female delegation from Khyber Pakhtunkhwa, including the former lawmakers Bushra Gohar and Jamila Gilani, visited Khaisor to interview the women of the village about the incident. The visiting women were particularly struck by the story of Noorani Bibi, an illiterate old woman from Khaisor who had recorded each time the security forces raided her house while no men were at home by drawing 25 lines on a sheet of paper. "Many women told us that if their husbands or other male relatives are involved or suspected of any wrongdoing, the security forces can detain and investigate them, but they should not barge into our houses," Jamila said. "Women and children have been psychologically affected by the break-ins and harassment," Bushra added.

== Bamyan ==
On 14 February 2019, a gathering was held by PTM supporters in Bamyan, the cultural center of the Hazarajat region in central Afghanistan. They gathered in front of the Buddhas of Bamyan, which had been destroyed by the Taliban in 2001 and became a symbol of oppression. Carrying banners of PTM leaders, the protesters condemned the alleged extrajudicial murder of Arman Loni, one of the leaders of PTM. They protested against the Pakistani government and military for allegedly oppressing the Pashtuns and Baloch.

== Wanna (second gathering) ==
On 15 March 2019, PTM held its second gathering of Wanna, South Waziristan. Ali Wazir, who represents South Waziristan in the National Assembly of Pakistan and is one of the leaders of PTM, said during the gathering: "The Pashtuns have suffered a lot from terrorism. We want peace for the future generations of the Pashtuns." The participants chanted slogans against terrorism and demanded punishment for the assistant superintendent of police (ASP) Attaur Rehman, who had allegedly extrajudicially killed the PTM leader Arman Loni in the previous month in Loralai.

On 16 March, the supporters of PTM organized a march from Wanna to Angur Ada, a town at the border between South Waziristan and the Barmal District of Afghanistan's Paktika Province. In Angur Ada, the participants condoled and protested for the eight Kabulkhel Wazir tribesmen who had been killed on the evening of 9 March in the Rakha village of Barmal District by an Afghan pro-government armed group supported by international military forces. The United Nations Assistance Mission in Afghanistan took notice of the Barmal killings and found out that the search operation was originally against the Taliban but resulted in civilian casualties, including children. In response to the protest, the Afghan government announced to probe the killings through a commission.

== Peshawar (second gathering) ==
PTM scheduled a large gathering on 31 March 2019 in Peshawar near Sarhad University, with the purpose to commemorate the martyrdom (shahādat) of the late PTM leader Arman Loni and demand justice for him. Arman's sister, Wranga Loni, chose Peshawar as the site of the gathering because of the city's role as an important center of the Pashtuns.

== Miramshah ==
On 14 April 2019, PTM supporters gathered in Miramshah, the capital of North Waziristan. The gathering included many women and children demanding the recovery of their missing relatives. Manzoor Pashteen said during his speech at the gathering that despite Operation Zarb-e-Azb by the Pakistani military, targeted killings have increased in North Waziristan for the last one year. Pashteen added: "We want peace on this peaceful soil. The resources of the Pashtuns have been stolen and captured by others, and now it is time for them to stand up and get equal rights from this state." The participants also demanded the government to stop the construction of Kurram Tangi Dam on the Kurram River in North Waziristan, citing that the dam would bring a large part of their area under water and displace a large number of people.

== Bannu (second gathering) ==
PTM's second gathering of Bannu was held at Mandan Park on 12 January 2020. During the gathering, Manzoor Pashteen announced the formation of a jirga (assembly of leaders) to appeal for unity among Pashtun leaders belonging to various Pakistani political parties. In response, leaders of various parties, including Jamiat Ulema-e-Islam (F)'s Maulana Atta-ur-Rehman, Jamaat-e-Islami's Mushtaq Ahmad Khan, Awami National Party's Asfandyar Wali Khan, Pashtunkhwa Milli Awami Party's Mahmood Khan Achakzai, and Qaumi Watan Party's Sikandar Sherpao expressed their willingness to cooperate with PTM for protection of the rights of Pashtuns.

== Loralai ==
On 9 February 2020, PTM held a protest gathering in Loralai in the northeast of Balochistan to mark the first death anniversary of Arman Loni, a PTM leader who was allegedly killed on 2 February 2019 during a police crackdown in Loralai. Just before the gathering, security forces arrested Wranga Loni, Sanna Ejaz, Arfa Siddiq, and other female PTM activists as they were on their way to the gathering site but later released them when political activists gathered outside the police station to protest for them. Therefore, the female activists were able to join the gathering on time.

The protesters at the gathering demanded justice for Arman and also demanded the Pakistani government to immediately release Manzoor Pashteen, who had been arrested on 27 January 2020 on sedition charges. Pashteen's arrest drew widespread condemnation throughout the world, including by the Afghan President Ashraf Ghani, the European Foundation for South Asian Studies (EFSAS), Human Rights Watch, and Amnesty International. Mulla Behram and several other PTM activists were detained by the police as they were on their way back to their hometowns from the Loralai gathering. A few days after the gathering, citizen rights of the PTM activist Sardar Gulmarjan Kibzai, who helped organize the gathering, were revoked by the Deputy Commissioner of Loralai through a public notice.

Also on 9 February, another protest rally was simultaneously held by PTM in the city of Karachi. Ghinwa Bhutto, the chairperson of the Pakistan Peoples Party (Shaheed Bhutto), also attended the Karachi rally and supported PTM's demands.

== Dera Ismail Khan (second gathering) ==
PTM's second protest gathering of Dera Ismail Khan was held on 16 February 2020. The protesters called for the immediate release of PTM's leader Manzoor Pashteen.

== Charsadda ==
On 1 March 2020, PTM held a public gathering at Municipal Park, Charsadda, during which Manzoor Pashteen welcomed the 2020 Afghan peace agreement which was signed on 29 February between the United States and the Taliban in Qatar. Talking about Ehsanullah Ehsan, the former spokesman of Tehrik-i-Taliban Pakistan who escaped from the custody of Pakistani Agencies in early February 2020, Pashteen said "PTM would never forgive the killers of Pashtuns’ children." He asked: "What will the Pakistani state respond when the parents of the victims of 2014 Peshawar school massacre question them who was Ehsanullah Ehsan and why was he kept as a guest by the Pakistan army?" Pashteen thanked the Afghan President Ashraf Ghani, the previous President Hamid Karzai, and other leaders, political parties, and human rights activists in Afghanistan, Pakistan, and other countries for demanding for Pashteen's release during his month-long detention.

After the Charsadda gathering, the police arrested two PTM activists for allegedly disrespecting the flag of Pakistan during the gathering.
