= Arif Wazir =

Pakistani politician (1982–2020)

Sardar Arif Wazir
- عارف وزیر
- Born: May 2, 1982; Ghawa Khwa, Wanna, South Waziristan, Federally Administered Tribal Areas, Pakistan
- Died: May 2, 2020 (aged 38); Islamabad, Pakistan
- Cause of death: Gunshot wounds
- Burial place: Ghawa Khwa, Wanna, South Waziristan, Pakistan
- Citizenship: Afghan, Pakistani
- Occupations: Politician, human rights activist
- Political party: Pashtunkhwa Milli Awami Party
- Movement: Pashtun Tahafuz Movement
- Children: 5
- Father: Saadullah Jan Wazir
- Relatives: Ali Wazir (cousin); Malik Mirzalam Wazir (uncle)

Arif Wazir (Pashto: محمد عارف افغان وزیر; 2 May 1982 – 2 May 2020) was a Pakistani politician, activist, and a leader of the Pashtun Tahafuz Movement (PTM). He was a member of the Pashtunkhwa Milli Awami Party (PMAP) and its president for the South Waziristan chapter. He also headed the FATA Political Alliance South Waziristan, which campaigned for the rights of the people of former Federally Administered Tribal Areas.

Wazir's family was long active in the Pashtun nationalist movement and opposed to the Talibanization of the former tribal areas, earning them the militants' enmity. His father (Saadullah Jan), two brothers (Ibrahim and Ishaq), two uncles (Malik Mirzalam and Feroz Khan) and two cousins (Tariq and Farooq Wazir) were all murdered in targeted killings, and he also survived assassination attempts himself. He spent a significant amount of time in jail in the last few years of his life, especially after joining the PTM in March 2018.

On 1 May 2020, as he was driving home in Wanna just before the evening's fast-breaking meal, he was critically injured when gunmen in another vehicle shot him three times in the head, neck, and arm near his home. He succumbed to his injuries on the next day after being shifted to Islamabad for emergency surgery, becoming the 18th male member of his extended family to be killed by militants since 2003.

Amnesty International called on Pakistani officials to vigorously investigate the attack. The inspector-general of Khyber Pukhtunkhwa Police, Sanaullah Abbasi, said that Wazir was murdered because of his recent interview in Kabul, Afghanistan. A post from the verified Twitter account of the Governor of Punjab, Chaudhry Mohammad Sarwar, blamed the Indian intelligence agency RAW and the Afghan intelligence agency NDS for the attack. However, when a reporter requested the information minister Shibli Faraz to share progress about finding the murderers, he declined, saying "I don't know the details" of Wazir's assassination. PTM claimed that “state-sponsored militants” and the so-called "good Taliban" were responsible for the assassination, and held widespread protests during which several of its activists, including Gilaman Wazir and Nadeem Askar, were arrested by Pakistani authorities. Wazir was survived by his wife and five children. On 14 March 2022, the Pashtun National Jirga in Bannu demanded that Wazir's death be investigated by a credible judicial commission headed by Justice Qazi Faez Isa, and that the report be made public.

== Personal life and family ==
Arif belonged to the Ahmadzai Wazir tribe of the Pashtuns. His family, which had been part of the Pashtun nationalist movement for many years, earned the enmity of the militants because of the family's anti-Taliban stance. In July 2005, Arif's father Saadullah Jan, his brother Ibrahim, his uncle Malik Mirzalam (father of Ali Wazir), his cousin Tariq (brother of Ali Wazir), and another uncle Feroz Khan, were assassinated by militants in a single ambush near their home in Wanna. Ishaq Wazir, who was another brother of Arif, and Faruk Wazir, the elder brother of Ali Wazir, were shot dead in other isolated targeted killings. However, the Pakistani government did not investigate the killings and made no arrests. Because of losing his elders and adult family members, Arif was forced to quit his studies and become the man of the house.

The militants also ruined the businesses owned by his family. Their gas stations were demolished, their tube wells were filled with dirt, and their apple and peach orchards were sprayed with poisonous chemicals. In 2016, the government demolished his family's market in Wanna with dynamite under the Frontier Crimes Regulation, which authorized collective punishment, after a bomb killed an army officer. In an opinion article for The Diplomat, Ali Wazir discussed the incident: "While local officials admitted to me that it was an accident and we were not to blame, they nevertheless destroyed our livelihoods under the Frontier Crimes Regulation." Authorities also prevented the locals of Wanna from collecting donations to help Arif Wazir's family. “They were told it would set an unacceptable precedent because the government cannot let anyone help those it punishes,” wrote Ali Wazir.

== Political career ==
In the 2019 Khyber Pukhtunkhwa provincial election, Wazir contested the constituency PK-114 (South Waziristan-II) as an independent candidate. However, in the month before the election, he was arrested by the administration of South Waziristan along with another Pashtun independent candidate, Muhammad Iqbal Masud, who was contesting the constituency PK-113 (South Waziristan-I). Similarly, another PK-113 independent candidate, PTM leader Jamal Malyar, was put under house arrest because of which he could not run an election campaign. The Election Commission of Pakistan ordered the administration to immediately release Wazir and Iqbal Masud, declaring that their arrests were "tantamount to pre-poll rigging" in favor of other candidates.

Arif Wazir was still able to garner 10,272 votes in the election, losing to the Pakistan Tehreek-e-Insaf (PTI) candidate Naseerullah Wazir by a margin of 842 votes, who got 11,114 votes. Arif's supporters claimed that the results were rigged in favor of the PTI candidate.

=== Activism and detentions ===
In April 2017, Wazir was arrested for protesting against the unavailability of Internet and mobile services in Wanna.

On 23 March 2018, Wazir declared his full support for Manzoor Pashteen and PTM during a rally in Wanna. "The tribal Pashtuns abandoned homes to enable the army to take action against terrorists, but now the tribals are only treated as strangers on military check posts and are not even allowed to own homes and properties," said Wazir. Later in the day, he led the rally to the home of slain Naqeebullah Mehsud in Makeen, South Waziristan. On 24 March, Wazir was detained by the authorities under the Frontier Crimes Regulation for organizing the rally. Three other PTM activists were also arrested. PTM supporters protested against the arrests in front of press clubs in Peshawar, Quetta, Swat, Swabi, Bannu, Dera Ismail Khan, Zhob, Loralai, Killa Saifullah, Ziarat, Islamabad, Lahore, Karachi, and other cities.

On 19 June 2019, Wazir was arrested by the Deputy Commissioner of South Waziristan, just a month before taking part in the provincial election as independent candidate. On 27 June, the Election Commission of Pakistan observed that this "act of the administration prior to conduct of election was tantamount to obstructing the election campaign," and ordered the district administration to release him within a day.

On 19 July 2019, the Peshawar High Court ruled that the detention of Wazir and six other PTM activists was illegal and ordered that they should be released, if not wanted in other cases. However, Wazir was soon arrested again during a protest in Wanna. On 3 August, Wazir and 29 other PTM activists, who were arrested along with him in Wanna, were transferred to Dera Ismail Khan's central jail. In February 2020, Wazir was released because the authorities could not prove any charges against him.

On 17 April 2020, Wazir was detained by the police in Wanna and accused of making an "anti-Pakistan speech during his visit to Afghanistan" in the previous month. According to the Human Rights Commission of Pakistan, however, the allegation of being involved in anti-state activities was "an expedient label for human rights defenders, particularly those associated with the PTM." He was released on bail on 27 April.

During the last 26 months of his life, when he was a PTM leader, Wazir was detained six times and intermittently spent more than 13 months of time in jail.

=== 2018 assassination attempt ===
On 3 June 2018, during the Islamic holy month of Ramadan, local Taliban attacked Ali Wazir, Arif Wazir, and other supporters of PTM in Wanna. Ali remained unhurt but Arif, a local journalist Noor Ali Wazir, and dozens of others were injured, while four supporters of PTM were killed in the attack. Many of the injured were taken to hospitals in Dera Ismail Khan.

A local senior journalist, on condition of anonymity, told his sources confirmed that the attack was carried out by the Nazir Group, a faction of Taliban militants which operated in South Waziristan. The dispute between the two parties in Wanna had started on June 2 when a pro-government militant leader, Ainullah Wazir, took away Taqin hats from PTM activists by force and set the hats on fire. To condemn the act of the militant leader, Ali Wazir, cousin of Arif Wazir, announced that a protest sit-in was to be held by PTM in Wanna from June 4. In response, the militants with guns went to Ali Wazir's home and asked him to either leave the area or leave PTM. When Wazir refused to comply with their demand, they attacked Wanna's Mirzalam Market and a nearby petrol pump owned by Wazir's family. However, a large number of unarmed PTM supporters gathered at the market to support Wazir and resisted the militants, after which the militants indiscriminately opened fire on the PTM supporters. The PTM leader Mohsin Dawar claimed that when the militants fled after the attack was repulsed, security forces which reached the area also opened fire on the unarmed PTM supporters, injuring many of them. Mohsin Dawar added: “Even though the military imposed a curfew in the area, but it has not discouraged the people from coming out and expressing their support for the PTM.” PTM leader Manzoor Pashteen also claimed that the attackers were backed by the Pakistan Army and intelligence agencies. Following a protest call by Pashteen, PTM held protest rallies in several cities, including Peshawar, Quetta, and Islamabad, to condemn the attack on Wazir.

On June 4, Pakistan Army spokesman Major General Asif Ghafoor claimed at a press conference that a firefight had taken place between PTM supporters and a government sponsored peace committee, members of which were reported to be former members of the Taliban.

== Assassination ==
On 1 May 2020, only four days after his release from jail, Wazir was driving home when gunmen from another vehicle started following him. As he slowed down his car because of a speed breaker, the gunmen started firing at him. He was first hit by a bullet in his upper arm, followed by two other bullets in his neck and head. The attack came just a few minutes before sunset during the Islamic holy month of Ramadan, as he was going home to have a fast-breaking meal (iftar) with his family.

He was rushed to a local hospital in Wanna and then to DHQ hospital in Dera Ismail Khan. The doctors struggled to locate his depressed cephalic vein in the arm to set up a cannula for blood transfusion. They inserted a tube down his trachea to enable him to breathe artificially and applied pressure bandage to his head and neck wounds. In unconscious state, he was then transported by road to PIMS hospital in Islamabad for emergency surgery. However, he succumbed to his injuries at PIMS hospital on the morning of 2 May, which was his 38th birthday. His body was carried to his native village Ghawa Khwa in Wanna, where he was buried after the Islamic funeral prayer for him on 3 May, which was attended by tens of thousands of mourners despite the COVID-19 pandemic.

=== Responsibility ===
The Pakistani government was silent on the incident. The police in Wanna registered a case against unknown assailants, but no government official offered condolences to Wazir's family.

PTM activists claimed that “state-sponsored militants" were behind Wazir's assassination. Mohsin Dawar, one of the leaders of PTM, said: “We cannot say that these militants are unknown; they are known. They have their offices in Wanna; they are allowed by the state.” Talking about the 2018 attack in Wanna on Arif and his cousin Ali Wazir, Dawar asserted that the military referred to the gunmen involved in that attack as "peace committee", instead of "Taliban". "The government give them protection; they give them resources; if this is not called state support, what else can we call it,” Dawar added.

A post from the verified Twitter account of the Governor of Punjab, Chaudhry Mohammad Sarwar, blamed the Indian intelligence agency RAW and the Afghan intelligence agency NDS for the attack.

The inspector-general (IG) of Khyber Pakhtunkhwa Police, Sanaullah Abbasi, said that Wazir was assassinated because of his recent interview to a private Afghan channel in Kabul. In March 2020, Arif and several other PTM leaders, including Ali Wazir and Mohsin Dawar, had traveled to Kabul as they were invited by the Government of Afghanistan to participate at President Ashraf Ghani’s oath-taking ceremony at the Arg presidential palace.

== See also ==
- Mohsin Dawar
- Mir Kalam
- Alamzaib Mahsud
- Abdullah Nangyal
