= Jamal Malyar =

Pakistani politician (born 1992)

- جمال مالیار
- Born: 1992 (age 32–33); South Waziristan, Pakistan
- Occupation(s): politician, human rights activist
- Movement: Pashtun Tahafuz Movement

Jamal Malyar Maseed (Pashto: جمال مالیار ماسید; Urdu: جمال مالیار محسود) is a Pakistani politician and one of the leaders of the Pashtun Tahafuz Movement (PTM). Malyar belongs to the Mahsud tribe of South Waziristan, Pakistan. He is a member of the Pashtunkhwa Milli Awami Party (PMAP).

== Political career ==
In the 2018 Pakistani general election, Jamal Malyar contested NA-49 (Tribal Area-X) South Waziristan as a candidate from the Pashtunkhwa Milli Awami Party (PMAP), but lost to the Muttahida Majlis-e-Amal (MMA) candidate Maulana Jamal ud Din.

In the 2019 Khyber Pakhtunkhwa provincial election, Malyar contested PK-113 (South Waziristan-I) as an independent candidate. However, the administration of South Waziristan restricted him to his house because of which he could not run an election campaign. Hafiz Assamuddin of Jamiat Ulema-e-Islam (F) won the election. "The administration gave me no reason for imposing this sort of house arrest," Malyar said.

== Detention in South Waziristan ==
In September 2017, Malyar and a couple of other human rights activists, namely Manzoor Pashteen and Shah Faisal Ghazi, were detained by the security forces of Pakistan at Barwand check post in Tiarza Tehsil, South Waziristan, because of their protest against landmines in Dera Ismail Khan a few days earlier. However a day later, they were released by the military because of the social media campaign for them by their supporters.

== See also ==
- Mohsin Dawar – Pakistani politician (born 1984)
- Ali Wazir – Pakistani politician and activist
- Arif Wazir – Pakistani politician (1982–2020)
- Mir Kalam Wazir – Pakistani politician
- Alamzaib Mahsud – Pakistani human rights activist
- Abdullah Nangyal – Pakistani politician and human rights activist
