= Ali Wazir =

Pakistani politician and activist

- علي وزیر
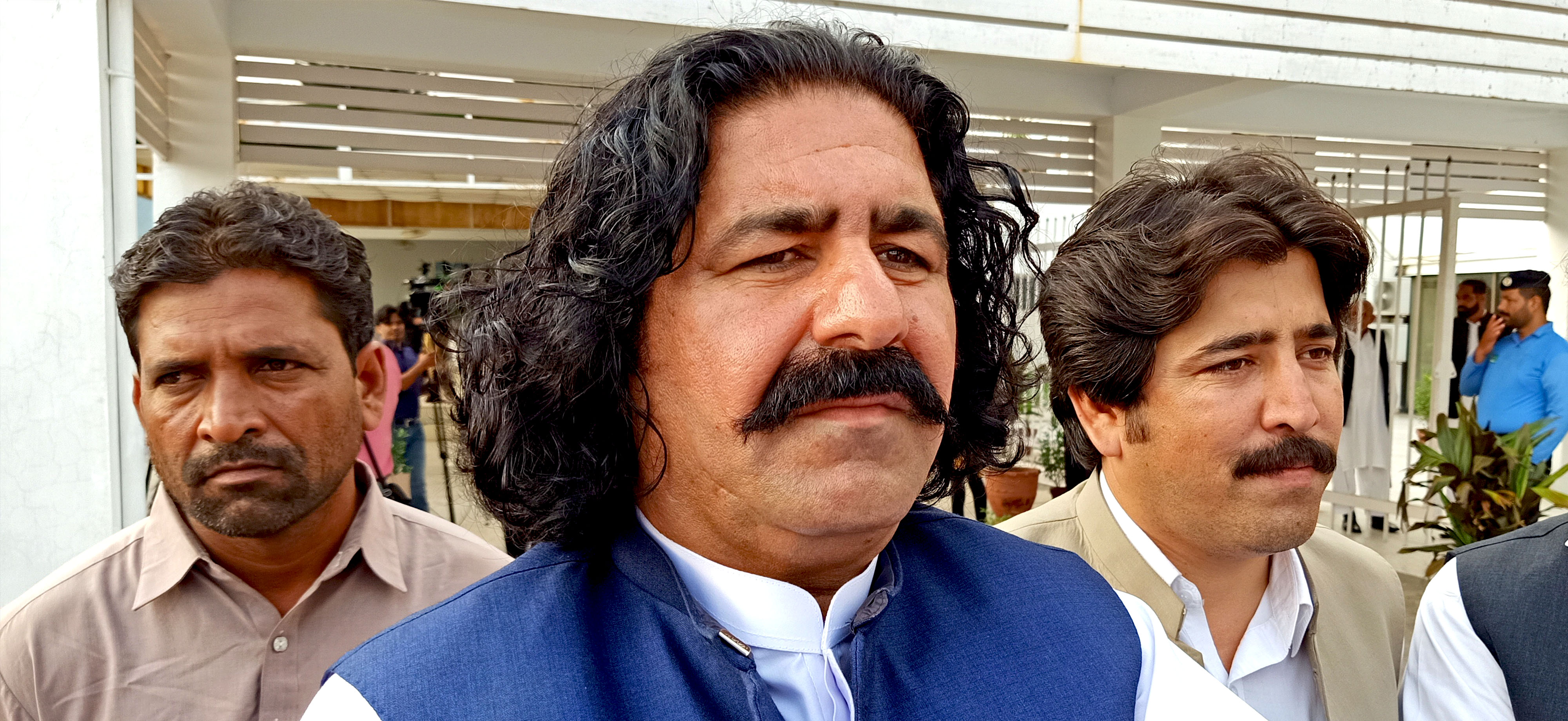

Member of the National Assembly of Pakistan
- In office 13 August 2018 – 10 August 2023
- Constituency: NA-50 (Tribal Area-XI)

Personal details
- Born: October 21, 1976 (age 49) Ghawa Khwa, Wanna, South Waziristan, Federally Administered Tribal Areas, Pakistan
- Party: AP (2026-present)
- Other political affiliations: IND (2024-2025); PTI (2018-2023)
- Spouse: Saira Wazir
- Children: 6
- Parents: Malik Mirzalam Wazir (father); Khwazhamina Wazir (mother)
- Relatives: Arif Wazir (cousin); Saadullah Jan Wazir (uncle); Farooq Wazir (brother)
- Education: Gomal University

Muhammad Ali Wazir (Pashto: محمد علي وزیر) is a Pakistani politician who is the co-founder of a human rights movement, Pashtun Tahafuz Movement (PTM). He had been a member of the National Assembly of Pakistan from August 2018 till August 2023. During his student life, he was active in the Pashtun Students Federation (PSF), an allied wing of the Awami National Party (ANP).

Wazir's family was long active in the Pashtun nationalist movement and opposed to the Talibanization of the former tribal areas, earning them the militants' enmity. His father (Malik Mirzalam), two brothers (Farooq and Tariq), two uncles (Saadullah Jan and Feroz Khan), and three cousins (Ibrahim, Ishaq and Arif Wazir) were all murdered in targeted killings. On 3 June 2018, Ali Wazir himself survived an assassination attempt by the Taliban in Wanna, South Waziristan, who opened fire on him, killing four supporters of PTM and injuring dozens others, including Arif Wazir.

On 16 December 2020, Wazir was arrested on allegations of treason in Peshawar, where he was present to commemorate the 2014 Peshawar school massacre. He was handed over to the Sindh Police and shifted to Karachi. Qamar Javed Bajwa, the Pakistan Army Chief, stated on 1 July 2021 that Wazir would have to apologize for criticizing the Pakistan Army and then he could be released, but Wazir refused to apologize. On 14 March 2022, the Pashtun National Jirga in Bannu demanded that Wazir be immediately released along with all other political prisoners. After more than two years in jail, Wazir was released on 14 February 2023.

== Personal life and family ==
Muhammad Ali Wazir was born on October 21, 1976 in Ghawa Khwa, a village in the Wanna Tehsil of the South Waziristan district of the Federally Administered Tribal Areas into the Ahmadzai clan of the Wazir tribe of the Pashtuns. His father, Malik Mirzalam Wazir, was the chief of the Ahmadzai Wazir tribe. Ali received his early education in Wanna, South Waziristan. While studying law at the Gomal University, Dera Ismail Khan, he was influenced by the International Marxist Tendency (IMT) group and became a political activist.

In 2003, his elder brother Farooq Wazir, who was an activist critical of the Taliban presence in Waziristan, was assassinated by the Taliban militants in front of his family's gas station in Wanna. Farooq Wazir became one of the first Pashtun victims of the Taliban and al-Qaeda in Pakistan. It marked the start of a long campaign during which the Taliban and al-Qaeda killed thousands of local activists, politicians, and clerics who had opposed Talibanization and who had asked the authorities to ensure peace in the former Federally Administered Tribal Areas near the Durand Line.

In June 2004, Ali's father was picked up by the authorities under the collective punishment clause of the Frontier Crimes Regulation. In July 2005, while Ali was in jail under the same law, the Taliban killed his father, his brother Tariq, his uncle Saadullah Jan (father of Arif Wazir), his cousin Ibrahim (brother of Arif Wazir), and another uncle Feroz Khan in a single ambush near their home in Wanna. When Ali was briefly released by the authorities, the funerals had already ended. The Pakistani government did not investigate the killings and made no arrests.

Remembering that 2005 day, Ali's mother, Khwazhamina, said: "Our whole front yard was red with the blood oozing from our martyrs. Our house was eerily silent and empty after their remains were taken to the graveyard for burial. Only the cries of our small children echoed in the blank courtyard." Her family said that she lived in a doorless room afterwards, because of her fear of being awaken to a tragic news by a knock at her door again. Referring to her struggle later, Ali's mother said, "when I moved to Dera Ismail Khan in 2005, after my sons and husband were murdered, I brought 15 orphans with me. The government gave me some money to compensate for the deaths, and with that money, I built this house. I raised my family." Over the years, "the men killed in our family left behind seven widows. I always tell the widows not to weep so our enemies won't elate in their success."

On 1 May 2020, Ali's first cousin Arif Wazir, who had been released from jail just four days earlier, was critically injured when gunmen shot him in Wanna. The attack came just a few minutes before sunset during the Islamic holy month of Ramadan, as he was driving home to have a fast-breaking meal with his family. He died from his injuries on 2 May. Between 2003 and 2020, a total of 18 male members of Ali Wazir's extended family were killed by militants.

The militants also ruined the businesses owned by his family. Their gas stations were demolished, their tube wells were filled with dirt, and their apple and peach orchards were sprayed with poisonous chemicals. In 2016, the government demolished their market in Wanna with dynamite under the Frontier Crimes Regulation, which authorized collective punishment, after a bomb killed an army officer. In his opinion article for The Diplomat, Wazir discussed the incident: "While local officials admitted to me that it was an accident and we were not to blame, they nevertheless destroyed our livelihoods under the Frontier Crimes Regulation." Authorities also prevented the locals of Wanna from collecting donations to help his family. "They were told it would set an unacceptable precedent because the government cannot let anyone help those it punishes," wrote Wazir.

== Political career ==
Wazir ran for the seat of the National Assembly of Pakistan as an independent candidate from Constituency NA-41 (Tribal Area-VI) in the 2008 Pakistani general election but was unsuccessful. He received 3,294 votes and lost the seat to independent candidate Abdul Maalik Wazir. In the 2013 Pakistani general election, he again ran for the seat of the National Assembly as an independent candidate from Constituency NA-41 (Tribal Area-VI) but was unsuccessful. He received 7,641 votes, and narrowly lost the seat to Ghalib Khan, a candidate of the Pakistan Muslim League (N). Reportedly, the Taliban intimidated and tortured Wazir's voters and supporters which resulted in his defeat by 300 votes.

In 2018, he became one of the founding leaders of the Pashtun Tahafuz Movement (PTM) which emerged after the extrajudicial killing of Naqeebullah Mehsud at the hands of police in Karachi. He was offered a nomination on the Pakistan Tehreek-e-Insaf (PTI) ticket by Imran Khan to contest the 2018 general election from his Constituency NA-50 (Tribal Area-XI), which he declined. The PTI did not field a candidate in the constituency.

He was elected to the National Assembly as an independent candidate from Constituency NA-50 (Tribal Area-XI) in the 2018 general election. He received 23,530 votes, and defeated independent candidate Syed Tariq Gailani. The residents of Wanna bore the expenses of his election campaign and hundreds of people volunteered to campaign for him.

=== Criticism of the Pakistan Armed Forces ===
Wazir is known for his vocal criticism of Pakistan's military establishment. He blames the Pakistan Armed Forces for human rights violations during its large-scale military operations, including Operation Rah-e-Nijat in South Waziristan in 2009, during which time he was forced to stay in Dera Ismail Khan due to the insecurity in Waziristan. "It was a long and dark period when our people suffered in every imaginable way. There were several military operations; people were displaced, and markets were demolished. Targeted assassinations and suicide attacks were common. The Taliban and al-Qaeda were running parallel courts and meting out punishments, but the government forces were largely relegated to military camps." He said that in all this tragedy, "only the Pashtun civilians suffered. The Taliban, al-Qaeda, and the Pakistan Army had all joined hands against them."

During his speech on 1 March 2020 at the PTM public gathering in Charsadda, he stated that the United States claimed to have achieved its goals after its peace deal with the Taliban, but it "should explain who the actual backers of terrorists in the region" were. To eradicate terrorism, he urged the US to "target the terror factories in Pakistan's GHQ [headquarters of the Pakistan Army], Rawalpindi, Islamabad and Lahore in the same way that the US [had] destroyed Afghanistan and the Pashtuns." He also opposed the barbed barrier along the Durand Line and demanded that all historic routes on the Afghan-Pakistani border be ensured for trade and free movement of people.

=== Detentions ===
On 21 April 2018, a night before the PTM public gathering in Lahore, the police arrested Wazir along with several other leading activists, including Ismat Shahjahan and Fanoos Gujjar of the Awami Workers Party (AWP). As a result of protests in various parts of the country and a social media campaign for them, they were released within hours. The arrests were criticized by the public and notable politicians, including Maryam Nawaz, Pervaiz Rashid, and Bilawal Bhutto Zardari.

On 30 November 2018, Wazir and Mohsin Dawar, his fellow parliamentarian and PTM leader, were traveling to Dubai, UAE to attend a Pashtun cultural event, but they were offloaded from their flight at Bacha Khan International Airport, Peshawar. The Federal Investigation Agency kept Wazir and Dawar in custody for three days. Dawar demanded action against the personnel who arrested them without getting prior permission from the Speaker of the National Assembly.

On 26 May 2019, Wazir was arrested by the military in Kharqamar, North Waziristan, after the Kharqamar incident. Mohsin Dawar, who went into hiding for the following four days, also handed himself over to the police in Bannu on 30 May. After almost four months in jail, Wazir and Dawar were released on bail on 21 September 2019. On 14 October 2020, the government withdrew the Kharqamar case against PTM, and Wazir and Dawar were acquitted of the charges against them.

On 16 December 2020, Wazir was arrested in Peshawar after he attended a ceremony at the Shuhada-e-Army Public School Public Library commemorating the 6th anniversary of the Peshawar school massacre, which had killed 149 people, including 132 schoolchildren. The arrest was made in connection with sedition charges registered against him and several other leaders of PTM in Karachi. On 30 November 2021, he was granted post-arrest bail by the Supreme Court of Pakistan. However, his release was stalled by an anti-terrorism court in Karachi (ATC-XII) which requested additional verification, before his arrest order in another case. Human rights activists and PTM members Alamzaib Mahsud and Qazi Tahir Maseed also appeared before the anti-terrorism court in Karachi at the same time, who had been similarly arrested for allegedly defaming state institutions. Wazir, who is diabetic, complained of inadequate medical facilities at his jail. He was admitted to hospital at least twice while in detention.

On 14 March 2022, the Pashtun National Jirga in Bannu demanded that Wazir be immediately released along with all other political prisoners.

On 21 June 2022, the Speaker of the National Assembly, Raja Pervaiz Ashraf, issued an order to produce Wazir at the National Assembly in Islamabad in order for him to represent his constituency at the budget session, but on the same day, the police shifted Wazir from his jail to Karachi's Jinnah Postgraduate Medical Centre for check-up. According to Wazir, he was attacked twice at the hospital, first on 21 June and later on 22 June. He protested outside the hospital, demanding that he be shifted to Islamabad for the National Assembly's budget session, and that otherwise, he be sent back to jail because he felt his life was in danger at the hospital. Wazir was shifted back to Karachi's jail on 23 June and not allowed to attend the budget session.

On 23 October 2022, foreign minister Bilawal Bhutto Zardari was confronted by several protesters at a conference in Lahore, chanting slogans for Wazir's release, to which Bilawal responded that they "should go and protest in front of those who have the power to release him."

On 14 February 2023, Wazir was released after spending more than two years in jail.

=== 2018 assassination attempt ===
On 3 June 2018, when he was campaigning for the 2018 general election during the Islamic holy month of Ramadan, gunmen affiliated with the Taliban attacked Wazir and other supporters of the Pashtun Tahafuz Movement (PTM) in Wanna, South Waziristan. He survived but four supporters of PTM were killed in the attack while dozens of others, including Ali's cousin Arif Wazir and a local journalist Noor Ali Wazir, were injured. Many of the injured were taken to hospitals in Dera Ismail Khan.

A local senior journalist, on condition of anonymity, told his sources confirmed that the attack was carried out by the Nazir Group, a faction of Taliban militants which operated in South Waziristan. The dispute between the two parties in Wanna had started on June 2 when a pro-government militant leader, Ainullah Wazir, took away Pashteen hats from PTM activists by force and set the hats on fire. To condemn the act of the militant leader, Ali Wazir announced that a protest sit-in was to be held by PTM in Wanna from June 4. In response, the militants with guns went to Wazir's home and asked him to either leave the area or leave PTM. When Wazir refused to comply with their demand, they attacked Wanna's Mirzalam Market and a nearby petrol pump owned by Ali Wazir. However, a large number of unarmed PTM supporters gathered at the market to support Wazir and resisted the militants, after which the militants indiscriminately opened fire on the PTM supporters. The PTM leader Mohsin Dawar claimed that when the militants fled after the attack was repulsed, security forces which reached the area also opened fire on the unarmed PTM supporters, injuring many of them. Dawar added: "Even though the military imposed a curfew in the area, but it has not discouraged the people from coming out and expressing their support for the PTM." PTM leader Manzoor Pashteen also claimed that the attackers were backed by the Pakistan Army and intelligence agencies. Following a protest call by Pashteen, PTM held protest rallies in several cities, including Peshawar, Quetta, and Islamabad, to condemn the attack on Wazir.

On June 4, Pakistan Army spokesman Major General Asif Ghafoor claimed at a press conference that a firefight had taken place between PTM supporters and a government sponsored peace committee, members of which were reported to be former members of the Taliban.

== See also ==
- Pashtun Tahafuz Movement
- Pakistan
