= Arman Loni =

Pakistani human rights activist

- ارمان لوڼی
- Born: 1983; Sanjawi, Ziarat District, Balochistan, Pakistan
- Died: February 2, 2019 (aged 35); Loralai, Balochistan, Pakistan
- Resting place: Killa Saifullah, Balochistan, Pakistan
- Education: University of Balochistan, Quetta
- Occupations: professor, human rights activist, poet
- Employer(s): Degree College Quetta, Degree College Killa Saifullah
- Organization: Pashtun Progressive Writers
- Political party: Pashtunkhwa Milli Awami Party
- Movement: Pashtun Tahafuz Movement
- Children: 3
- Father: Mohammad Ismail Loni
- Relatives: Wranga Loni (sister)

Mohammad Ibrahim Arman Loni (Pashto: محمد ابراهیم ارمان لوڼی), commonly known as Arman Loni (or Arman Luni), was a Pakistani teacher of Pashto literature, poet, and one of the founding leaders of the Pashtun Tahafuz Movement (PTM). Arman died on 2 February 2019 after a clash with the police, which followed his participation at a protest sit-in outside Loralai Press Club.

The four-day sit-in had been organized by PTM activists, including Arman and his sister Wranga Loni, to protest against the 2019 Loralai attack, in which eight policemen and a civilian had been killed by the Pakistani Taliban on January 29, 2019. His family and PTM activists said that as the police attacked him and other activists, a policeman struck Arman on the head with a gun, causing him to collapse. However, according to a police spokesman, the death was caused by a heart attack following clashes between protesters and police. He died at the hospital. The postmortem reports indicated no torture marks on his body but there was a blood clot in his brain. In a parliamentary panel, senators Farhatullah Babar and Muhammad Ali Saif supported the claims made by Arman's family and said that according to their information, the postmortem noted some critical marks in his brain, indicating that the head injury had caused some blood clots in the brain which led to his death. Mohsin Dawar, a parliamentarian and PTM leader, said that an application to lodge a first information report (FIR) for the murder was submitted against the prime suspect assistant superintendent of police (ASP) Attaur Rehman Tareen, a retired Pakistan Air Force officer. The police, however, refused to lodge an FIR, which was criticized by Shireen Mazari, the federal Human Rights Minister. On February 3, Balochistan Chief Minister Jam Kamal Khan took notice of Arman's death and sought an official report from the commissioner of Zhob Division within 48 hours.

On February 4, the Pashtunkhwa Milli Awami Party (PMAP) and other allied political parties observed a 'shutter down' strike in Balochistan in protest against the murder. PTM also held widespread protests in reaction to the murder, during which dozens of its activists, including Gulalai Ismail and Abdullah Nangyal, were arrested by Pakistani authorities. The arrests received widespread criticism, including condemnation from Afghan President Ashraf Ghani and the Pakistan Peoples Party (PPP). Amnesty International and Human Rights Watch called on Pakistani officials to transparently investigate the death, with the former also calling on the authorities to immediately release the PTM activists arrested for protesting against the murder. On March 14, 2022, the Pashtun National Jirga in Bannu demanded that Arman's death be investigated by a credible judicial commission headed by Justice Qazi Faez Isa, and that the report be made public.

== Personal life and education ==
Arman belonged to a modest family from Sanjawi in the Ziarat District of Balochistan, Pakistan. He belonged to the Loni Durrani tribe of the Pashtuns, and his father was a driver. Arman was a fan of football. He had three daughters, Mina, Awesta, and Hila. His younger sister, Wranga Loni, is also a human rights activist and writer.

When Arman was a 14-year-old student of the 7th grade, he started working as a waiter at the restaurant where his elder brother, Muhammad Qasim, also worked. Arman would take over Qasim's duties during the second half of his shift. Arman received his early education in Sanjawi and completed his master's degree in Pashto at the University of Balochistan, Quetta. While pursuing his education, Arman also started working seasonally as a clerk at coal mines, and part-time as a tailor, to support his family financially.

Despite the economic hardships, Arman started taking part in political activities of the Pashtunkhwa Milli Awami Party and became a human rights activist during his student life. Later on, Arman also pursued his Master of Philosophy degree. He wrote a thesis on "using metaphors in Pashto folklore literature against colonial enemies," a topic which mirrored his political thoughts.

== Career and political activism ==
After his master's degree, Arman successfully passed the Balochistan Public Service Commission test in 2012 and became a lecturer of Pashto literature at Degree College Quetta. He was the founder of "Pashtun Progressive Writers" (پښتانه مترقي لیکوال, Paṣhtānə Mutaraqī Līkwāl), an organization aimed at nurturing the new generation of Pashtun authors.

Arman was an active member of the Pashtunkhwa Milli Awami Party (PMAP) and its student wing, the Pashtunkhwa Students Organization (PSO), since his student life. He and his younger sister, Wranga Loni, joined the Pashtun Tahafuz Movement (PTM, "Pashtun Protection Movement") as soon as it emerged in February 2018. Both Arman and Wranga Loni actively took part in organizing the PTM public gatherings, usually traveling to the gathering site a week earlier to help run awareness campaigns among the locals. At the gatherings, Wranga would mostly give speeches from the stage but Arman would usually prefer to be behind the scenes. His family was threatened by Pakistani law enforcement agencies and pro-government tribal elders for their activities in the Pashtun Tahafuz Movement. The Loni tribal chief warned Arman to stop his activities and told him that the agencies would not tolerate it. Consequently, Arman's family was forced to move from Sanjawi to Killa Saifullah, the hometown of Nawab Ayaz Jogezai, the Pashtun tribal chief who offered them refuge. Arman then transferred himself from Degree College Quetta to Degree College Killa Saifullah to live with his family.

Arman was arrested on May 12, 2018, before the PTM public gathering in Karachi, but he resumed his activism immediately after his release. On January 30, 2019, just three days before his death, Arman organized a sit-in in Karachi against the arrest of fellow PTM activist Alamzaib Mahsud, who had been arrested on January 21, 2019 after the second PTM gathering in Karachi. Following the Karachi sit-in, Arman travelled to Loralai for the last sit-in of his life.

== Death ==
At the time of his death on February 2, 2019, the four-day sit-in in Loralai held by PTM activists to protest against the 2019 Loralai attack had been called off, and after negotiating with the government, the protesters were peacefully dispersing. When Arman was having tea that evening after the end of the protest, his friends told him that the police was looking for him. According to several eyewitnesses, assistant superintendent of police (ASP) Attaur Rehman Tareen, a retired Pakistan Air Force flight lieutenant, was involved in the attack, who started assaulting Arman with the butt of his gun as soon as seeing him. Shouting at one of his constables, "you don't know how to hit," Tareen delivered the fatal blow to his neck, causing Arman to collapse on the ground. Arman's family also blamed the police for barring him from reaching the hospital on time, and for preventing PTM activists from visiting Arman at the hospital until he had died.

The police refused to lodge a first information report (FIR) and a police spokesman said Arman was not beaten but that he died of a heart attack following clashes between protesters and police.

On March 5, 2019, the standing committee on human rights in the Senate of Pakistan condemned the police for refusing to lodge a first information report (FIR) for Arman's death. The committee ordered the police to lodge an FIR and launch an inquiry against the accused police officers.

=== Funeral prayers ===
Late on February 3, the Islamic funeral prayer for Arman was performed in Killa Saifullah. PTM leaders Manzoor Pashteen, Ali Wazir, and Mohsin Dawar were banned by the Pakistani government from entering Balochistan for Arman's funeral prayer, but they still succeeded in travelling to Killa Saifullah and participated in the funeral prayer. However, they were ordered by the government to leave Balochistan within the night. This move was condemned by the Pakistan Peoples Party senator Farhatullah Babar.

During the burial ceremony in Killa Saifullah, Manzoor Pashteen, Wranga Loni, and Nawab Ayaz Jogezai made speeches to the public. Pashteen said: "They killed our youth, beheaded our elders, destroyed our homes, dishonored our mothers and sisters. They still chase our youth. It reached a point where they even prevent us from attending our funerals. In such circumstances, when you block all our options and ways for negotiations, we will forcibly find a way. Then we will show you the power of Pashtuns."

In his opinion article for The New York Times, Pashteen wrote that on their way back from Killa Saifullah after attending the funeral, the security forces fired at the car transporting himself, Ali Wazir, and Mohsin Dawar, but luckily they were unharmed. The firing incident was condemned by the Pashtunkhwa Milli Awami Party senator Usman Kakar and the human rights minister Shireen Mazari.

Absentee funeral prayers were performed for Arman in many cities and towns of Afghanistan, Pakistan, and other countries, including Jalalabad, Asadabad, Khost, Peshawar, Dera Ismail Khan, and Karachi on February 3, Kabul, Kandahar, Gardez, Sharana, Puli Alam, and Zhob on February 4, Mazar-i-Sharif, Herat, Ghazni, Qalati Ghilji, Bannu, and Barikot (Swat) on February 5, and Kunduz on February 7. In Bamyan, a protest gathering for Arman was held on February 14 in front of the Buddhas of Bamyan to condemn his murder.

=== Investigation ===
Although Arman's family maintained he was hit by the police, the police claimed that the death was caused by a heart attack following clashes between protesters and police.

The initial autopsy, conducted by Saleem Abro, the medical superintendent of Quetta's Civil Sandeman hospital, in the presence of 10 health experts, said there were no torture marks on Arman's body. Saleem Abro and Police Surgeon Ayesha Faiz, while addressing the media, said the blood samples of Arman's brain, heart and body had been sent to a forensic laboratory in Lahore in order to ascertain the cause of death. They added, "we found a blood clot in his brain, while the deceased's face had turned blue."

=== Reactions ===
==== Human rights organizations ====
More than 20 activists of the Pashtun Tahafuz Movement, including Gulalai Ismail and Abdullah Nangyal, were arrested by the Pakistani government during protests against Arman's murder. Rabia Mehmood, South Asia Regional Researcher at Amnesty International, stated: "These protestors must be released immediately and unconditionally. They are prisoners of conscience and have done nothing but exercise their peaceful and lawful right to protest against human rights violations and call for end to them. It is shocking that the Pakistani authorities have resorted to such heavy-handed methods even as senior government officials have clearly acknowledged that the PTM has legitimate grievances that must be addressed. To add insult to injury, the crackdown follows the horrific death of Arman Luni, one of PTM's activists."

Brad Adams, executive director of the Asian division of Human Rights Watch, said: "Pakistani officials should recognize the country's diversity as a strength and not a weakness. The government should listen to and engage the concerns of the country's many communities and allow for peaceful expression of dissent. As a start, the authorities should ensure the investigation into the death of Arman Luni is effective and transparent."

==== Afghan government ====
Condemning the murder of Arman and the crackdown by Pakistani authorities against the nonviolent PTM activists, Ashraf Ghani, the President of Afghanistan, tweeted: "The Afghan government has serious concerns about the violence perpetrated against peaceful protestors and civil activists in Khyber Pakhtunkhwa and Balochistan." He further said: "We believe it is the moral responsibility of every government to support civil activities that take a stand against the terrorism and extremism that plagues and threatens our region and collective security."

However, Mujib Rahman Rahimi, the spokesman of Afghanistan's Chief Executive Abdullah Abdullah, criticised Ashraf Ghani and termed his remarks as interference in another country's affairs. Rahimi said that the issues around PTM are "an internal matter of Pakistan. Afghanistan is not in a position which will interfere in others' affairs. We have many problems and issues inside our country and it is better to address them first." Shah Mehmood Qureshi, the Pakistani federal minister for foreign affairs, also rejected Ghani's tweet and called it a "gross interference" in the internal affairs of Pakistan. On the other hand, Amrullah Saleh, the former Afghan interior minister who had resigned to join Ghani's team in the upcoming presidential elections, praised Ghani and called on the Afghan civil society to show "solid solidarity with the peaceful civil activists in Khyber Pakhtunkhwa and Baluchistan." Responding to the allegation by Shah Mehmood Qureshi, Saleh said: "We [Afghanistan] have been on the receiving end of terror and Taliban for years sent and exported from your country [Pakistan]. We have just sent back a tweet. There is a gross imbalance in our bilateral trade and tweet."

==== Opposition parties in Pakistan ====
The Pakistan Peoples Party Chairman Bilawal Bhutto Zardari called for an "independent and transparent inquiry" into the "brutal killing" of Arman.

Referring to the 'shutter down' strike in Balochistan on February 4, the Pashtunkhwa Milli Awami Party senator Usman Kakar said in his speech to mourners: "This entire region is seething with anger. This is why everywhere from Quetta [in the south] to Sherani in the north is voluntarily observing a complete shutdown."

== See also ==
- Killing of Naqeebullah Mehsud
- Tahir Dawar
