= Babu Muhammad Rafique =

Pakistani politician

Alhaj Babu Muhammad Rafique Kahloon is a former member of the Provincial Assembly of West Pakistan from Loralai, serving in the fifth and sixth assemblies from June 9, 1962, until March 25, 1969.

Alhaj Babu Rafique shaking hand with Ayub Khan
