= Zubair Khan Wazir =

Member of the National Assembly of Pakistan from South Wazirisran (2024–2029)

- زبیر خان وزیر

Member of the National Assembly of Pakistan
- Incumbent
- Assumed office 29 February 2024
- Constituency: NA-42 South Waziristan Upper-cum-South Waziristan Lower

Personal details
- Party: PTI (2024-present)

Zubair Khan Wazir (Urdu: زبیر خان وزیر) is a Pakistani politician who has been a member of the National Assembly of Pakistan since February 2024.

== Political career ==
Wazir won the 2024 Pakistani general election from NA-42 South Waziristan Upper-cum-South Waziristan Lower as an independent candidate. He received 20,022 votes while the runner-up, another independent candidate, Ali Wazir received 16,194 votes.
