= Ghalib Khan =

Pakistani politician

- غالب خان

Minister of State for States and Frontier Regions
- In office 4 August 2017 – 31 May 2018
- President: Mamnoon Hussain
- Prime Minister: Shahid Khaqan Abbasi

Member of the National Assembly of Pakistan
- In office 1 June 2013 – 31 May 2018
- Constituency: NA-41 (South Waziristan Agency)

Personal details
- Born: 8 October 1964 (age 62)
- Party: Pakistan Muslim League (N)

Ghalib Khan (Urdu: غالب خان; born 8 October 1964) is a Pakistani politician who served as Minister of State for States and Frontier Regions, in Abbasi cabinet from August 2017 to May 2018. He served as a member of the National Assembly of Pakistan from June 2013 to May 2018.

== Early life ==
He was born on 8 October 1964.

== Political career ==
Khan ran for the seat of the National Assembly of Pakistan as an independent candidate from Constituency NA-41 (Tribal Area-VI) in the 2002 Pakistani general election, but was unsuccessful. He received 1,140 votes and lost the seat to Abdul Maalik Wazir.

He ran for the seat of National Assembly from Constituency NA-41 (Tribal Area-VI) as an independent candidate in the 2008 Pakistani general election, but was unsuccessful. He secured 7,921 votes and lost again to Abdul Maalik Wazir.

He was elected to the National Assembly as a candidate of Pakistan Muslim League (N) from Constituency NA-41 (Tribal Area-VI) in the 2013 Pakistani general election. He received 8,022 votes and defeated an independent candidate, Ali Wazir, by a narrow margin of 300 votes. Following the election of Shahid Khaqan Abbasi as Prime Minister of Pakistan in August 2017, he was inducted into the federal cabinet of Abbasi. He was appointed as the Minister of State for States and Frontier Regions. Upon the dissolution of the National Assembly on the expiration of its term on 31 May 2018, Khan ceased to hold the office as minister.
