= NA-49 (South Waziristan-I) =

Constituency of the National Assembly of Pakistan

NA-49 (Tribal Area-X)
- Constituency for the National Assembly of Pakistan
- Region: South Waziristan
- Electorate: 178,293

Current constituency
- Created from: NA-42 (Tribal Area-VII)
- Replaced by: NA-43 South Waziristan Upper-cum-South Waziristan Lower

NA-49 (Tribal Area-X) (Urdu: این اے-۴۲، قباَئلی علاقہ-۷) is a constituency for the National Assembly of Pakistan comprising Ladha Subdivision, Makin Subdivision, Sararogha Subdivision, and Serwekai Subdivision of South Waziristan.

== Members of Parliament ==
=== 2002–2018: NA-42 (Tribal Area-VII) ===
Election	Member	Party
2002	Maulana Mohammad Merajuddin	Independent
2008	TBC	TBC
2013	Muhammad Jamal ud Din	JUI (F)

=== Since 2018: NA-49 (Tribal Area-X) ===
Election	Member	Party
2018	Muhammad Jamal ud Din	MMA

== Election 2002 ==
General elections were held on 10 Oct 2002. Muhammad Miraj-ud-Din an independent candidate won by 12,360 votes.

== Election 2008 ==
Due to security reason elections didn't take place.

== Election 2013 ==
General elections were held on 11 May 2013. Muhammad Jamal Ud Din of JUI-F won by 3,468 votes and became the member of National Assembly.

== Election 2018 ==
General elections were held on 25 July 2018.

General election 2018: NA-49 (Tribal Area-X)
Party	Candidate	Votes	%	±%
MMA	Muhammad Jamal ud Din	7,794	21.10	
PTI	Dost Muhammad Khan	6,606	17.89	
Independent	Qayyum Sher	6,075	16.45	
Independent	Abdul Raheem Khan Burki	3,800	10.29	
Independent	Muhammad Iqbal	2,588	7.01	
ANP	Malak Jehangir Khan	2,333	6.32	
Independent	Sherpao	2,129	5.76	
Independent	Noor Hassan	1,907	5.16	
Independent	Saddam Hussain	1,225	3.32	
Others	Others (sixteen candidates)	1,972	5.34	
Turnout		36,930	20.71	
Rejected ballots		501	1.36	
Majority		1,188	3.21	
Registered electors		178,293		
MMA^{†} hold		Swing	N/A	

^{†}JUI-F contested as part of MMA

== See also ==
- NA-48 (Tribal Area-IX)
- NA-50 (Tribal Area-XI)
