= Mohammad Merajuddin =

Pakistani politician and islamic scholar

Mohammad Merajuddin Mehsud

Religious life
- Denomination: Sunni

Member of the National Assembly of Pakistan
- In office 2002–2007
- Constituency: NA-42 South Waziristan

Personal details
- Born: 1972 South Waziristan
- Died: 20 May 2010 (aged 37–38) Tank
- Cause of death: Assassination
- Party: Jamiat Ulema-e-Islam (F)
- Occupation: Politician

Mohammad Merajuddin Mehsud was a Pakistani politician and Islamic scholar who served as members of the 12th National Assembly of Pakistan from 2002-2007.

== Death ==
He was assassinated on 20 May 2010 in Tank.

== See also ==
- List of Deobandis
