= Abdul Maalik Wazir =

Pakistani politician

Member of the National Assembly of Pakistan
- In office 2002–2013
- Constituency: NA-41 (Tribal Area-VI)

Abdul Maalik Wazir is a Pakistani politician who has been a member of the National Assembly of Pakistan from 2002 to 2013.

== Political career ==
He was elected to the National Assembly of Pakistan from Constituency NA-41 (Tribal Area-VI) as an independent candidate in the 2002 Pakistani general election. He received 8,005 votes and defeated an independent candidate, Muhammad Saleh Shah.

He was re-elected to the National Assembly from Constituency NA-41 (Tribal Area-VI) as an independent candidate in the 2008 Pakistani general election. He received 7,957 votes and defeated Ghalib Khan. He was criticized for his poor performance during his tenure as Member of the National Assembly.

He contested the National Assembly Constituency NA-41 (Tribal Area-VI) as a candidate of Jamiat Ulema-e Islam (F) (JUI-F) in the 2013 Pakistani general election but was unsuccessful. He received 3,045 votes and lost the seat to Ghalib Khan.
