= Baran Khan Kudezai =

Afghan politician

Malak Baran Khan Kudezai
- Born: 1875; Loralai, British India
- Died: 1945 (aged 69–70); Loralai, British India
- Known for: Politician and Freedom Fighter (Indian National Congress, Anjuman-i-Watan)
- Successor: Malak Methar Khizer Kudezai

Malak Baran Khan Kudezai (1875–1945) was a politician and Chief of the Marmakhel Tribe which consists of sub-tribes in Loralai i.e. Kudezai, Shabozai, Khadarzai, Malazai, Adhorhzai, Walizai, Alizai etc. He was also an active member of Loya jirga (Afghanistan Grand Council/Assembly).

== Early age ==
Baran's father, Malik Sulaiman, was a Malak (an honorary title given by Tribal Elders) of the Marmakhel tribes living in Loralai District. Sulaiman had a dominant role in his Bori, resolving disputes among his tribes as well as participating in various tribal gatherings and representing the Marmakhel tribes in the District Councils. Sulaiman taught his son the traditions and principles of attending tribal meetings.

Baran started his education in local madrassa at the age of six. He shifted to an urban school established under the British Raj] in the cantonment area of Loralai.

== Political activity ==
Baran started his political journey as a district executive member of the All India National Congress. He visited Delhi, Mumbai and Lahore to attend meetings and seminars of congressmen. As a member of Loya jirga, he also visited Kabul, Zabul, Kandahar in Afghanistan for the annual meeting of the Masharaan (Elders). He represented the Southern Regions of British India Pashtun regions of Balochistan state in the council.

Following the defeat of the Kakar Tribesmen in 1881–1882, British forces entered Loralai without resistance and occupied areas of Bori, Duki, Sanjavi and Mekhtar. In 1884, a platoon of 4800 men were stationed at Loralai Bori. Around the same time, many people like Zarak Khan Churmai, Malak Wasal Kudezai, Amanullah Khan, Sherjan Khan, Thor Sawan had started guerrilla war against British invasion. However, there was no concept of political and democratic struggle in the tribal areas of Loralai, Zhob, Barkan.

In 1936, Baran became involved in Anjuman-i-Watan, the democratic movement against British rule in India, which was founded by Abdul Samad Khan Achakzai's. This was the first organized democratic movement in the history of Loralai.

By 1937, the movement had attracted a large following, demanding a separate homeland for Pashtuns. In 1938, Anjuman-i-Watan held a huge meeting in Loralai, along with Khan Abdul Ghaffar, one of the founders of the Pashtun resistance movement Khudai Khidmatgar.

For his political activism, Baran was arrested and imprisoned at the Central Jail in Quetta, where he spent 18 months.

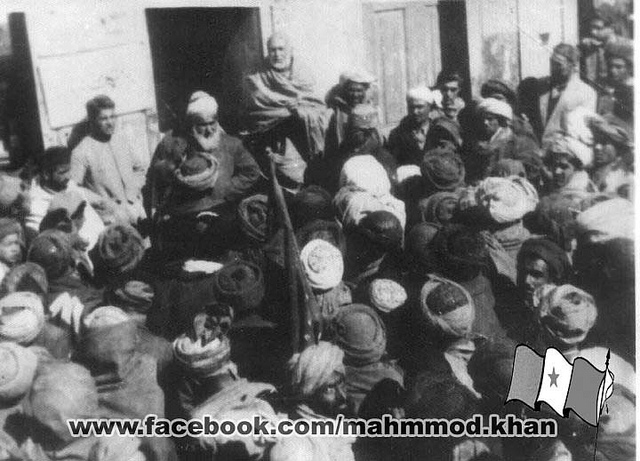
A corner meeting of Anjuman-i-Watan in Loralai City 1936

== Death ==
Baran Khan died from cancer in 1945. His death was memorialized by many people in Loralai in the form of poems.

== Sources ==
- Magazine Olas 1969 V
- Balochistan District Gazetter Loralai Chapter, 1936, 1937, 1940, 1942
- Daily Jang News Paper Quetta January 2003
