= Sarhad University of Science & Information Technology =

Private sector university in Pakistan

Coordinates: 33.9636°N 71.5292°E

Sarhad University of Science and Information Technology
- SUIT
- Type: Private
- Established: 2001
- Affiliations: Higher Education Commission (Pakistan), Pakistan Engineering Council, Pharmacy Council of Pakistan, Pakistan Medical and Dental Council
- President: Muhammad Riaz Karim
- Vice-president: Azmat Ali
- Vice-Chancellor: Saleem ur Rehman
- Dean: Waheed Mughal
- Director: Syed Rafaqat Ali
- Location: Peshawar, Khyber-Pakhtunkhwa, Pakistan
- Campus: Islamabad, Peshawar, Bannu, Mardan, United Arab Emirates
- Nickname: SUIT
- Website: suit.edu.pk

The Sarhad University of Science and Information Technology (colloquially known as Sarhad University) is a private university in Peshawar, Khyber-Pakhtunkhwa, Pakistan. Established in 2001, it offers a wide range of programs from bachelor to doctoral level.

It is the only private university in Pakistan to have recently introduced an educational satellite channel SUIT TV. The aim is to facilitate convenient access to education for students in the current era. This initiative by Sarhad University is a significant step toward modernizing the education system and marks a major contribution to educational institutions.

Current strength: more than five thousand students studying in this university and more than twenty five thousand students are enrolled in distance education with Sarhad University.

== Overview ==
Sarhad University is chartered by the Government of Khyber Pakhtunkhwa and recognized by the Higher Education Regulatory Authority (HERA) Khyber-Pakhtunkhwa. It is also recognized by the Higher Education Commission (Pakistan) (HEC) and awarded highest category (W3).

== Academics ==
The university has the following faculties:

- Faculty of Engineering & Technology
- Faculty of Science, Computer sciences & IT
- Faculty of Management Sciences
- Faculty of Life Sciences
- Faculty of Art, Social Sciences & Education

== Departments ==
The university has following departments:

- Civil Engineering
- Mechanical Engineering
- Electrical Engineering
- Technologies
- Department of computer science & IT
- Department of Mathematics
- Department of Pharmacy
- Department of Art & Design
- Department of Education
- Department of Humanities
- Department of Libraries & information sciences
- Department of sports science & Physical education
- Department of Urdu
- Department of English
- Department of Business Administration

== SUIT Distance Education ==
As per its Charter, the University has a mandate to offer education through distant/virtual means of education. The program was launched in 2002, which is duly approved by the Higher Education Department of Khyber Pakhtunkhwa. It is registered with the Higher Education Regulatory Authority, KP and recognized by the Higher Education Commission of Pakistan.

Under this program, established educational institutions across Khyber Pakhtunkhwa, Sindh, Azad Jammu and Kashmir, Gilgit-Baltistan, and the Islamabad Capital Territory have been registered to operate as Distance Education Centres (DECs) and facilitation centres for students enrolled in the distance education program.

The Governments of Baluchistan and KP have also granted NOCs to launch Distance Education Program in the major cities of Baluchistan and newly merged FATA districts, respectively, which will soon be materialized.

== Islamabad campus ==
The Islamabad campus is located in Chatta Bakhtawar and is composed of three faculties which are:

- Faculty of sciences, Computer Sciences & IT
- Faculty of Life Sciences
- Faculty of Art, Social Sciences & Education

The Islamabad campus is Chartered by Government and recognised by Higher Education Commission, accredited by Allied Health professional council, National computing Education accreditation council, Pakistan Nursing & Midwifery council & Pharmacy council of Pakistan.

== UAE sub campus ==
Sarhad University established a sub campus in Ras al-Khaimah, UAE in 2017 which is approved by the HEC, Pakistan and licensed by the Government of Ras Al Khaimah, UAE.
