= Alamzaib Mahsud =

Pakistani political activist (born 1992)

Alamzaib Khan Mahsud
- Born: 1992 (age 33–34); Ladha, South Waziristan, Federally Administered Tribal Areas, Pakistan (present-day Khyber Pakhtunkhwa, Pakistan)
- Occupation: Activist for human rights
- Movement: Pashtun Tahafuz Movement

Alamzaib Khan Mahsud (Note: Pashto: عالمزېب خان ماسید; Urdu: عالمزیب خان محسود) (born 1992) is a Pakistani political activist from South Waziristan, Khyber Pakhtunkhwa. He is one of the founding members of the Pashtun Tahafuz Movement (PTM, formerly known as the Mahsud Tahafuz Movement), and is instrumental in gathering data on missing persons and landmine victims in the merged tribal districts (former Federally Administered Tribal Areas).

== Personal life and education ==
Alamzaib graduated in chemistry, and completed his master's degree in political science. His maternal grandfather was a member of the Pakistan Army Special Service Group.

== Political activism ==
During his graduation studies, Alamzaib became a political activist. Formerly serving as the president of the Waziristan Chapter of Insaf Student Federation, he became one of the founders of the Pashtun Tahafuz Movement (formerly known as the "Mahsud Tahafuz Movement" after the Mahsud tribe). Regarding why the movement was started, he said: "We have grown up watching all of this violence happen around us. In the end, we thought that someone should raise their voice, someone should ask the harsh questions. And we saw that there was no one. Not our political leadership, not our tribal leaders, no one is willing to ask these questions." During a protest camp of landmine victims in Tank, Khyber Pakhtunkhwa, Alamzaib said: "In my area, these landmine explosives are scattered all over the place. I have taken pictures myself of unexploded artillery shells." According to him, he approached the Pakistani military three times to clear the shells from his village but was rejected each time. "Three months later, soldiers did arrive, but they were not there to remove the mines. Instead, they threatened my family and warned me to stop complaining about the dangers of living in our village on social media. So for three months they weren't able to send a unit, but then [on my Facebook post] they took such rapid action," he added.

On 26 January 2018, Alamzaib, Manzoor Pashteen, and 20 other activists started the Pashtun Long March from Dera Ismail Khan. As the protest march reached Islamabad, a sit-in called "All Pashtun National Jirga" was organized from 1 to 10 February 2018. The jirga condemned the murder of the Pashtun shopkeeper and aspiring model, Naqeebullah Mehsud, who was murdered in Karachi during a fake encounter by the police, and asked the government to set up a judicial inquiry for Naqeebullah Mehsud as well as all the other Pashtuns murdered extrajudicially in police encounters.

=== Detention in Karachi ===
On 20 January 2019, Alamzaib was an organizer of a PTM public gathering in Karachi, which was held to celebrate the first anniversary of the movement. After the demonstration, the police lodged a First Information Report against Alamzaib and 15 other PTM activists, accusing them of using "undesirable language against state institutions" and charging them under anti-terrorism and public order laws. On 21 January, Alamzaib was disembarked and taken away from his car on a busy road in the city by an armed police team, which included a man in plainclothes brandishing pistol at him. Amnesty International, a human rights organization, showed concern about his disappearance and tweeted: "His whereabouts must be disclosed immediately. Either produce him in court or release him without delay." They added: "Other PTM activists with him were allegedly beaten up. Freedom of peaceful assembly must be protected. Activists must never be attacked." Alamzaib was presented in court on 22 January in handcuffs, with his face hooded. His arrest caused a social media outcry and protest demonstrations were held for him in several cities, including Karachi, Peshawar, Mardan, Swabi, Islamabad, and Quetta.

After about eight months in prison, he was granted bail against a surety bond of Rs500,000 by the Supreme Court of Pakistan on 16 September 2019, a few days after which he was released.

=== Book ban in Pakistan ===
In November 2020, Alamzaib's book I Am Not The Accused, I Am The Complainant was banned by Pakistani authorities. The book detailed his detention at Karachi and his role in the Pashtun Tahafuz Movement (PTM), documenting his experiences and the injustices faced by Pashtuns.

Alamzaib condemned the ban as a violation of freedom of expression guaranteed by the Pakistani Constitution. He stated, "If they do not take this ban back, then I will take it to court. This ban is a continuation of the atrocities we endure.” The book, published in both Pashto and Urdu, included accounts of his time in prison, his investigation into forced disappearances, and his activism with landmine victims.

== See also ==
- Manzoor Pashteen
- Killing of Naqeebullah Mehsud
- Tahir Dawar
- Arman Loni
- Abdullah Nangyal
- Gulalai Ismail
