= Muhammad Jamal ud Din =

Pakistani politician

- محمد جمال الدین

Member of the National Assembly of Pakistan
- In office 13 August 2018 – 10 August 2023
- Constituency: NA-49 (Tribal Area-X)
- In office 1 June 2013 – 31 May 2018
- Constituency: NA-42 (South Waziristan Agency)

Personal details
- Born: 1 January 1961 (age 65)
- Party: Jamiat Ulema-e-Islam (F)

Maulana Muhammad Jamal ud Din (Urdu: محمد جمال الدین; born 1 January 1961) is a Pakistani politician who had been a member of the National Assembly of Pakistan from August 2018 till August 2023. He was also a member of the National Assembly from June 2013 to May 2018.

== Early life ==
He was born on 1 January 1961.

== Political career ==
He was elected to the National Assembly of Pakistan as a candidate of Jamiat Ulema-e-Islam (F) from Constituency NA-42 (Tribal Area-VII) in the 2013 Pakistani general election. He received 3,468 votes and defeated an independent candidate, Qayyum Sher Mahsud.

He was re-elected to the National Assembly as a candidate of Muttahida Majlis-e-Amal (MMA) from Constituency NA-49 (Tribal Area-X) in the 2018 Pakistani general election. He received 7,794 votes and defeated Dost Muhammad Khan, a candidate of Pakistan Tehreek-e-Insaf.

== See also ==
- List of Deobandis
