= Talibanization =

Following of Taliban practices by a religious group or movement

The term Talibanization (or Talibanisation) refers to a type of Islamist practice that emerged following the rise of the Taliban movement in Afghanistan, where other religious groups or movements come to follow or imitate the strict practices of the Taliban.

== Practices ==
In its original usage, Talibanization referred to groups who followed Taliban's practices such as:

- usually strict regulation and segregation of women, including forbidding of most employment or schooling for women and girls;
- the restriction or banning of Western culture and other activities generally tolerated by other Muslims such as music, sports, general entertainment (films, television, arts, etc.), and the Internet;
- the banning of activities (especially hairstyles and clothing) generally tolerated by other Muslims on the grounds that the activities are "Western", non-Islamic or immoral;
- aggressive prohibition and suppression of public displays of affection (PDA), adultery, extramarital sex, LGBT and pornography, particularly with the use of armed "religious police" and death penalty by rajm or beheading;
- the destruction of non-Muslim artifacts, especially carvings and statues such as Bamyan Buddhas, generally tolerated by other Muslims, on the grounds that these artifacts are idolatrous or Shirk;
- harboring of Al Qaeda or other extremists;
- a discriminatory attitude towards non-Muslims such as sumptuary laws against Afghan Hindus, requiring them to wear yellow badges, a practice reminiscent of Nazi Germany's policies.
- Violent suppression and persecution of modernist, moderate and liberal Muslims, often labeling them as bid'ah ("innovation" or deviation from fundamentalist Islamic interpretation).

== Etymology ==
The term pre-dates the Islamic terrorist attacks of 9/11. It was first used to describe areas or groups outside of Afghanistan which came under the influence of the Taliban, such as the areas of Waziristan in Pakistan, or situations analogous to the Taliban-Al-Qaeda relationship, such as the Islamic Courts Union (ICU) in Somalia and its harboring of Al Qaeda members, or similar harboring of Islamic extremists in Iran, Nigeria (north), Malaysia, or Indian-administered Kashmir and elsewhere around the world. It has been used to describe the influence of Islamist fundamentalist parties in Bangladesh.

The term was used in a Boston Globe editorial published on November 6, 1999, warning of the emerging threat of the Taliban regime almost two years before the attacks of September 11, 2001.

=== In the Gaza Strip ===
The influence of Islamic groups in the Gaza Strip has grown since the 1980s, especially because poverty has risen since fighting with Israel began in 2000. The efforts to impose Islamic law and traditions continued when Hamas forcefully seized control of the area in June 2007 and displaced security forces loyal to the secular President Mahmoud Abbas. After the civil war ended, Hamas declared the "end of secularism and heresy in the Gaza Strip." For the first time since the Sudanese coup of 1989 that brought Omar al-Bashir to power, a Muslim Brotherhood group ruled a significant geographic territory. Gaza human rights groups accuse Hamas of restricting many freedoms in the course of these attempts.

Following the takeover of the Gaza Strip in June 2007, Hamas has attempted to implement Islamic law in the Gaza Strip, mainly in schools, institutions and courts, by imposing the Islamic dress code or the wearing of the hijab on women. While Ismael Haniyeh officially denied that Hamas intended to establish an Islamic state, in the fourteen years since the 2007 coup, the Gaza Strip has exhibited the characteristics of Talibanization, whereby the Islamist organization imposed strict rules on women, discouraged activities commonly associated with Western or Christian culture, oppressed non-Muslim minorities, imposed sharia law, and deployed religious police to enforce these laws.

In 2009, Arab-Israeli journalist Khaled Abu Toameh wrote that "Hamas is gradually turning the Gaza Strip into a Taliban-style Islamic entity." According to Mkhaimar Abusada, a political science professor at Gaza's al-Azhar University, "Ruling by itself, Hamas can stamp its ideas on everyone (...) Islamizing society has always been part of Hamas strategy."

Palestinian researcher Dr. Khaled Al-Hroub has criticized what he called the "Taliban-like steps" which Hamas has taken. In an article titled "The Hamas Enterprise and the Talibanization of Gaza", he wrote, "The Islamization that has been forced upon the Gaza Strip – the suppression of social, cultural, and press freedoms that do not suit Hamas's view[s] – is an egregious deed that must be opposed. It is the reenactment, under a religious guise, of the experience of [other] totalitarian regimes and dictatorships.

The Popular Forces, a salafist militia that rose to prominence in the wake of the power vacuum left by Hamas, and are said to have had prior alleged ties with Islamist insurgents in the Sinai peninsula, seized eastern Rafah notably Al-Bayuk which became their de facto capital after the Rafah offensive.

=== In Yemen ===
Since the outbreak of the Yemeni civil war, the Zaidist-led Houthi movement have controlled most of the densely populated areas. The Houthi-led Supreme Political Council, an organization that promotes a religion-based model of governance which restricts women's freedom and advocates anti-Western sentiment and has been accused of practicing "Talibanization" by the Saudi-backed government. In addition, in Sunni-dominated southern Yemen, Salafist of Al Qaeda in the Arabian Peninsula has enforced the Sharia law in its Islamic Emirate of Yemen.

=== In Libya ===
The Government of National Unity instated a Taliban-like morality police to crack-down on "weird haircuts" and western practices.

== Reference to non-Muslims ==
The term is also used non-literally, and it is also applied to non-Islamic bodies and organizations by those who allege that they practice "repressive policies" which are based on their interpretation of their respective religions. In addition, some members of the American Left may use it to criticize the Republican Party and the Christian right in their allegations that the radical right wing is implementing policies which are based on Christian fundamentalism.

Sometimes, different analogous neologisms are used by the accusers, such as allegations of "saffronization" which are used to describe or critique right-wing policies which are related to Hindu nationalism or as a slur used by far left and anti-Hindu groups. Radicalized Muslims often exploit the resonance with this term to attack Hindu nationalists as kafirs (infidels) and "Hindu Talibs". In India, the term has also been used to denote Sikh Extremism (Khalistan supporters), and the far-left Naxalite terrorists beheaded Police inspector Francis Induwar in the state of Jharkhand in 2009. The action has been compared to the tactics of the Taliban, and fears exist that the leftists in these areas are "Talibanizing".

Like any highly politicized term, it may also be used hyperbolically or in an alarmist manner, to make a slippery slope argument, such as in the invocation of the phrase "Talibanization of Bradford" to discuss a gamut of common racial problems and tensions which fall far short of the imposition of sharia law and terrorist attacks. It may also be applied unfairly by those who do not understand Islamic culture and the basis of sharia law, or who fail to distinguish between moderate Islamic and extremist Islamist states, or misapplied to perceived threats which are not true or have yet to be proven.

== See also ==
- Pashtunization
- Islamic fundamentalism
- Islamism
- Al-Qaedaism
- Year Zero (political notion)
