= NA-42 South Waziristan Upper-cum-South Waziristan Lower =

Constituency of the National Assembly of Pakistan

- Constituency for the National Assembly of Pakistan
- Region: Upper South Waziristan; Lower South Waziristan
- Electorate: 467,292

Current constituency
- Party: Pakistan Tehreek-e-Insaf
- Member: Zubair Khan Wazir
- Created from: NA-49 Tribal Area-X & NA-50 Tribal Area-XI

NA-42 South Waziristan Upper-cum-South Waziristan Lower (این اے-42، اپر جنوبی وزیرستان-کم-لؤر جنوبی وزیرستان) is a constituency for the National Assembly of Pakistan. The constituency covers the entire districts of Upper South Waziristan and Lower South Waziristan.

== Members of Parliament ==
=== 2002–2018: NA-41 Tribal Area-VI ===
Election	Member	Party
2002	Abdul Malik	Independent
2008	Moulana Abul Malik Wazir	Independent
2013	Ghalib Khan	PML-N

=== 2018–2022: NA-50 Tribal Area-XI ===
Election	Member	Party
2018	Ali Wazir	IND

=== 2024-present: NA-42 South Waziristan Upper-cum-South Waziristan Lower ===
Election	Member	Party
2024	Zubair Khan Wazir	PTI

== Election 2002 ==
General elections were held on 10 Oct 2002. Abdul Malik an independent candidate won by 8,005 votes.

== Election 2008 ==
General election 2008 were held on 18 Feb, 2008. Maulana Abdul Malik Wazir an independent candidatewon by 7,957 votes.

== Election 2013 ==
General elections were held on 11 May 2013. Ghalib Khan of PML-N won by 8,022 votes and became the member of National Assembly.

== Election 2018 ==
General elections were held on 25 July 2018.

General election 2018: NA-50 Tribal Area-XI
Party	Candidate	Votes	%	±%
Independent	Ali Wazir	23,530	48.88	
Independent	Syed Tariq Gillani	8,250	17.14	
MMA	Mehmood Alam	7,515	15.61	
Others	Others (twenty-five candidates)	7,515	15.61	
Turnout		48,142	33.00	
Rejected ballots		1,332	2.76	
Majority		15,280	31.74	
Registered electors		145,872		
Independent gain from PML(N)				

== Election 2024 ==
General elections were held on 8 February 2024. Zubair Khan Wazir won the election with 20,240 votes.

General election 2024: NA-44 Dera Ismail Khan-I
Party	Candidate	Votes	%	±%
PTI	Zubair Khan Wazir (Note: Filed nomination papers as PTI candidate but ECP allowed him to run as an independent)	20,240	26.92	▲26.92
Independent	Ali Wazir	16,302	21.68	▼27.20
JUI (F)	Muhammad Jamal ud Din	14,252	18.96	N/A
Independent	Saeed Anwar	10,633	14.14	N/A
Independent	Gul Azeem	7,532	10.02	N/A
Others	Others (twenty-four candidates)	6,227	8.28	
Turnout		77,942	16.68	▼16.32
Total valid votes		75,186	96.46	
Rejected ballots		2,756	3.54	
Majority		3,938	5.24	
Registered electors		467,292		

== See also ==
- NA-41 Lakki Marwat
- NA-43 Tank-cum-Dera Ismail Khan
