= Taqin hat =

Traditional hat worn in the Afghanistan–Pakistan region

The red-and-black patterned Hazara traditional Taqin hat

The Taqin hat (Dari: کلاه تاقین), also known as Mazari hat (Dari: کلاه مزاری) and Pashteen hat (Pashto: د پښتين خولۍ), is a red-and-black-patterned hat originating from northern Afghanistan. Originally associated with the Hazaras and Uzbeks of Afghanistan, the cap became popular amongst the Afghanistan–Pakistan border region and is now worn throughout Afghanistan and parts of Pakistan.

== History ==
The Taqin hat originated in Mazar-i-Sharif or Sar-e Pol and was originally associated with the Hazaras and Uzbeks of Afghanistan. It is commonly worn by Afghan Uzbeks throughout northern Afghanistan. Taqin also became prominent among the Tajik people of Badakhshan.

The hat gained popularity among many Pashtuns of Pakistan after 2018 because of the rise to prominence of Manzoor Pashteen, the leader of the Pashtun Tahafuz Movement (PTM), who often wore it at public events and gatherings. The hat subsequently became a symbol of the PTM.

=== Taliban takeover in Afghanistan (2021–present) ===
Since the Taliban takeover of Afghanistan in 2021, the Taliban have been accused of restricting the Taqin hat. In August 2025, it was reported that the Taliban had taken these hats from locals and threatened anyone aligned with the PTM. In 2026, Taliban's minister of higher education Neda Mohammad Nadeem was accused of slapping an Uzbek student for wearing the Taqin hat. Neda rejected the accusations.

== See also ==
- Pakol
- Tubeteika
- Doppa
- Taqiyah cap
- Karakul hat
- Peshawari turban
