= Killing of Naqeebullah Mehsud =

Pakistani aspiring model killed in a fake police encounter

Police killing of Muhammad Naqeebullah Mehsud
- Date: 13 January 2018; 8 years ago
- Time: 3:21 p.m. (PST, UTC+05:00)
- Venue: An abandoned poultry farm
- Location: Usman Khaskheli Goth, Shah Latif Town, Karachi, Pakistan
- Cause: Extrajudicial murder by police
- Motive: Money
- Deaths: 4
- Convicted: SSP Rao Anwar's police team
- Sentence: No prosecutions; but SSP Rao Anwar and SP Altaf Sarwar Malik were suspended from their posts

Naseemullah (Urdu/Pashto: نسيم الله), better known as Muhammad Naqeebullah Mehsud (نقيب الله محسود), was killed on 13 January 2018 in Karachi, Pakistan, during an encounter by the senior superintendent of police (SSP) of Karachi's Malir District, Rao Anwar. On 3 January, Naqeebullah was kidnapped along with two of his friends, Hazrat Ali and Muhammad Qasim, by Rao Anwar's men in plainclothes from Gulsher Agha Hotel in Karachi. On 6 January, both of his friends were freed by the police, but Naqeebullah was kept in captivity, tortured, and then killed on 13 January in a staged encounter in which he was shot twice in the back. Alongside Naqeebullah, three other men (Muhammad Sabir and Muhammad Ishaq from Bahawalpur, and Nazar Jan Mahsud from South Waziristan) were also killed by the police in the encounter; Nazar Jan Mahsud was shot from close range.

On 17 January, Mehsud's body was handed over to his relatives at the Chhipa Welfare Association morgue in Karachi. On 18 January, his body was taken by his relatives to Tank, Khyber Pakhtunkhwa, where Islamic funeral prayer was performed for him, and on the same day, he was buried at his hometown of Makeen in South Waziristan. The fake encounter sparked countrywide protests against extrajudicial killings in Pakistan.

Referring to the killings, the police claimed that they had killed four suspected terrorists in a shootout. Rao Anwar claimed that Naqeebullah had links with the Pakistani Taliban (Tehrik-i-Taliban Pakistan, or TTP), Lashkar-e-Jhangvi (LeJ), and the Islamic State of Iraq and the Levant (Daesh). However, the claims were contested by Naqeebullah's relatives and human rights activists, especially the Pashtun Tahafuz Movement (PTM, or Pashtun Protection Movement), which launched a campaign to seek justice for him. An inquiry committee consisting of senior police officers was formed to investigate the killing, which found Naqeebullah to be innocent, and declared that the alleged police encounter staged to kill him and three others was fake.

Mehsud was survived by his wife, two daughters, and a son. On 24 January 2019, a Pakistani anti-terrorism court declared Naqeebullah and the three other persons murdered with him as innocent.

== Background ==
=== Naqeebullah Mehsud ===
Naseemullah, usually known as Naqeebullah, was born in 1992 in the Makin Tehsil of South Waziristan. He belonged to the Abdullai Mahsud tribe of Pashtuns. In 2009, his family was forced to flee their home due to Operation Rah-e-Nijat by the Pakistan Armed Forces against the militants in South Waziristan. After migrating to Karachi, Naqeebullah had been working as a labourer. He was passionate about modeling and was an aspiring model. He had three brothers, one of whom had settled in Dubai, UAE. Naqeebullah was planning to start a garment business and had rented a shop in Sohrab Goth, Karachi shortly before he was kidnapped and murdered.

=== Rao Anwar ===
Rao Anwar, a senior superintendent of police (SSP) in the Malir District of Karachi, led the team staging the fake encounter and was already known for carrying out controversial police encounters in Karachi. He was known as the "encounter specialist" of the Sindh Police.

== Abduction of Mehsud and his friends ==
On the evening of 3 January 2018, Mehsud, Hazrat Ali, and Muhammad Qasim, who had become friends via Facebook, were out together in Sohrab Goth when they were abducted by men in plainclothes. Hazrat Ali said, "we were taken to Sachal police station first. We waited for 50 minutes, then a cloth was tied to our eyes and we were taken to an undisclosed location." Ali added, "we could hear that they took Naqeebullah Mehsud first and he was being tortured. We could hear his screams. After Naqeebullah, the men came towards us [Ali and Qasim] and started to beat us up. After a while, the men forcefully put naswar down my throat. I couldn’t stop vomiting after that." According to Qasim, the men also checked Naqeebullah's messages on their mobile phones and questioned them about him. "After some time, we were let go but Naqeebullah had been separated from us. The police threatened us to not discuss the incident with anyone else", added Qasim.

Rao Anwar accused Mehsud of being a terrorist, but the inquiry committee of senior police officers probing the case found his allegation baseless. A mid-level police officer at the Malir police station, who had worked under Rao Anwar, remarked that money was the motive behind the picking up of Naqeebullah. He said: “Rao’s touts amongst the Sohrab Goth shopkeepers came to know that Naseem [Naqeebullah] was in possession of a hefty amount of money with which he wanted to buy a shop ... Two policemen — SI Yaseen Dhukku and ASI Akbar Mallah — picked him up along with two of his friends from a restaurant on Abul Hassan Ispahani road. While they let his friends go, they continued to torture him even after extracting Rs9 million, demanding he pay them Rs20 million more. By then, he was in such bad shape that they decided it would be unwise to set him free", added the police officer.

== Killing of Gul Saeed ==
On 16 January 2018, when the inquiry against Rao Anwar was about to start following the killing of Mehsud, Rao Anwar claimed he had come under attack in Karachi's Malir Cantonment while he was heading towards his house. He alleged that a suicide attacker detonated explosives near him and his squad but they remained unhurt, and that two accomplices of the attacker then opened fire on the police, both of whom were shot dead in the exchange of fire. He also alleged that a few militants escaped the site under the cover of fire while the police and Pakistan Rangers were conducting search operation. The alleged suicide attacker was later identified as Gul Saeed Afridi, a 34-year-old driver from Orangi Town, Karachi, who had gone missing a few months earlier.

Gul Saeed's body was found to be burned badly, but not blown up and still in one piece, although it had allegedly fell far from Rao Anwar's armoured vehicle. Gul Saeed's family was outraged at the demands of the police from them after the killing. They protested and took Gul Saeed's body away from the police by force, but returned it to the mortuary after negotiations. The police placed the three dead bodies at the Chhipa Welfare Association morgue in Karachi. The other two bodies besides Gul Saeed, which were still unidentified, had been riddled with bullets. The Pakistani Taliban (Tehrik-i-Taliban Pakistan, or TTP) immediately claimed responsibility of the alleged suicide attack. Gul Saeed's family, however, appealed against Rao Anwar's allegations and claimed that Gul Saeed was innocent and had no links with terrorists. They asked how a suicide attack could even be possible in a sensitive area surrounded by the military like the cantonment, and asserted that Rao Anwar had in fact murdered Gul Saeed extrajudicially.

The Counter-Terrorism Department (CTD) probing the case doubted if a suicide attack had taken place at the site. Suggesting that it was a fake encounter, a senior CTD officer Omar Khattab said: “This has been observed for the first time that the suicide bomber, despite having himself blown up with explosives, was only burnt. While examining the site of the attack, no traces of any explosive material were found. Even there was no smell of explosives.” The investigators found out that contrary to Rao Anwar's claim, no exchange of fire had taken place. According to the investigators, the alleged suicide attacker Gul Saeed was first riddled by the police with bullets, then a suicide vest was wrapped around his body, and then the vest was set on fire which burned his body.

== Investigation ==
The inquiry committee of senior police officers probing Naqeebullah Mehsud's case found no sign of an exchange of gunfire at the site of the alleged police encounter, which was an abandoned poultry farm. Although the police officers who had taken part in the alleged shootout claimed that militants were hiding inside the poultry farm who attacked them when the police encircled the hideout, the inquiry committee found out that there was no gunfire from inside the poultry farm during the incident. Some marks of firing were found in a room and on walls of the poultry farm, which the inquiry team declared to be post-incident fabrications by the police team.

The committee found out that during his service as a senior police officer in the Malir District of Karachi between 2011 and 2018, Rao Anwar carried out at least 444 killings in 192 alleged encounters, whereas the total number of alleged police encounters led by him was 745, including 553 cases which did not involve any killings. However, not a single policeman was ever killed or even injured during his 745 alleged encounters. Eight people were killed in Rao Anwar's two alleged encounters in the first 19 days of January 2018 alone.

Senior police officers in Karachi, on condition of anonymity, claimed that the majority of the people killed during Rao Anwar's encounters were ethnic Pashtuns. They added that men were airlifted to Karachi from as far away as the Federally Administered Tribal Areas for Rao Anwar to deal with them. Another senior police officer stated: “[Rao Anwar] led a team of killing machines. There was no one to stop him.” Explaining why no notice was taken of Rao Anwar's actions earlier, the senior police officer revealed that “even the police command is afraid of him because of his close connections with then-President Asif Zardari and with elements in the security establishment.”

The inquiry committee termed the allegations by Rao Anwar against Naqeebullah as baseless and suggested to add Rao Anwar's name to the Exit Control List. They stated that the claims made by Rao Anwar, including the claim that Naqeebullah was unmarried, were untrue. The committee concluded that Naqeebullah was innocent and had no history of militancy or criminal activity, but was rather killed in a fake police encounter carried out by Rao Anwar. The four men including Naqeebullah were killed in two separate rooms of the abandoned farm by Rao Anwar's team and then their bodies were dumped in a single room. On 20 January 2018, Rao Anwar was removed from his post as senior superintendent of police (SSP) Malir on the recommendation of the committee.

On 23 January 2018, Rao Anwar attempted to flee the country in a Dubai-bound flight from Benazir Bhutto International Airport, Islamabad, but the Federal Investigation Agency foiled his attempt and stopped him at the immigration counter of the airport after observing that his No Objection Certificate was inauthentic.

On 24 January 2019, a Pakistani anti-terrorism court declared Naqeebullah and the three other persons murdered with him as innocent. On remand from the court, 13 police officials were imprisoned, but 7 suspects including Rao Anwar were granted bail. Anwar's trial began in 2020 and he was acquitted by the courts in January 2023.

On 30 April 2024, an eyewitness in the Naqeebullah Mehsud murder case retracted his previous statement during the hearing at an Anti-Terrorism Court (ATC). The case took an unexpected turn when former SHO Amanullah Marwat, Shoaib Shooter, and other defendants appeared before the court. During the proceedings, Head Constable Raja Jahangir deviated from his earlier statements, claiming that he was coerced into providing false testimony. Jahangir alleged that he had signed a statement drafted by the police under pressure from higher authorities, disavowing recognition of the seven accused individuals.

== Pashtun Tahafuz Movement ==
The Pashtun Tahafuz Movement (PTM), under the leadership of Manzoor Pashteen, launched a campaign to seek justice for Mehsud soon after his murder. PTM organized a series of protest marches and sit-ins at various cities. They held public gatherings in Islamabad, Quetta, Peshawar, Lahore, Swat, Karachi, Dera Ismail Khan, Swabi, Bannu, Tank, as well as other cities and towns, in which one of the main demands was to punish Rao Anwar and his team for murdering Naqeebullah.

On 23 March 2018, PTM leader Arif Wazir led a protest rally from Wanna to the home of Naqeebullah in Makeen, South Waziristan. On 24 March, Wazir was detained by the authorities under the Frontier Crimes Regulation for organizing the rally. Three other PTM activists were also arrested. PTM supporters protested against the arrests in front of press clubs in Peshawar, Quetta, Swat, Swabi, Bannu, Dera Ismail Khan, Islamabad, Lahore, Karachi, Zhob, Loralai, Killa Saifullah, Ziarat, and other cities.

== See also ==
- Pashtun Tahafuz Movement
- Manzoor Pashteen
- Tahir Dawar
- Arman Loni
