= Loralai =

Pakistani town

Loralai: لورلايي; لورالائی
- City
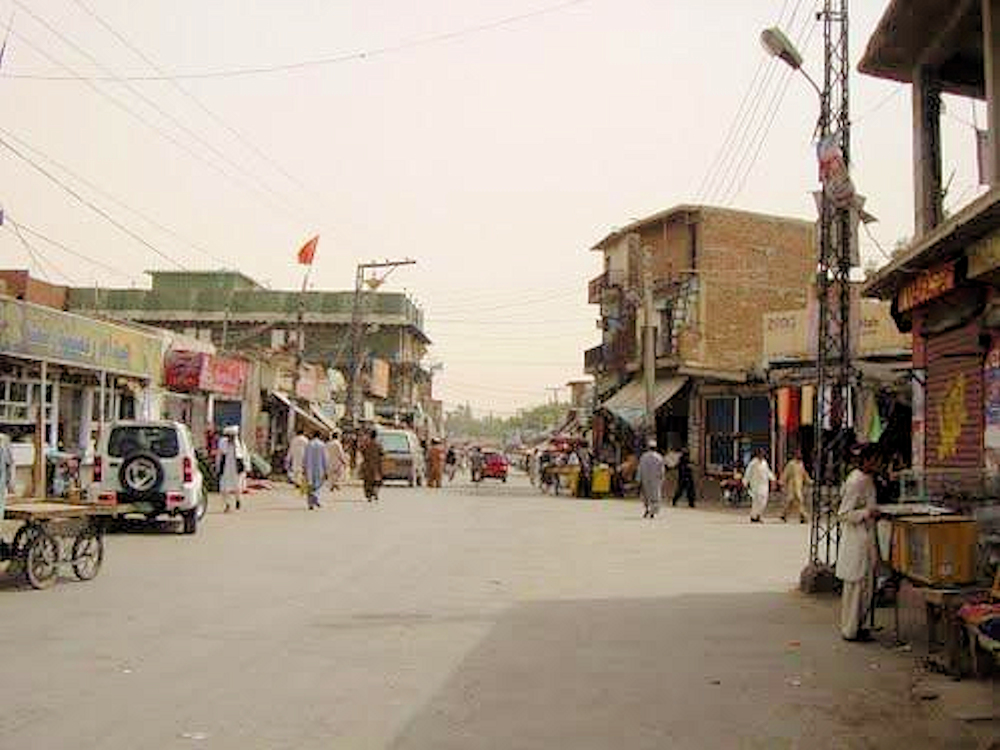
- City of Loralai

- Location within Balochistan, Pakistan Location within Pakistan
- Coordinates: 30°22′N 68°36′E
- Country: Pakistan
- Province: Balochistan
- Elevation: 1,411 m (4,629 ft)

Population (2023 Census)
  - Total: 56,613
- Time zone: UTC+5 (PST)
- Postal code: 84800
- Calling code: 824

Loralai (Pashto: لورلايي, Urdu: لورالائی), also known as Bori (Pashto: بورۍ), is a Pakistani city that serves both as the division headquarter of Loralai Division and the district headquarter of Loralai District. It is located in the northeastern part of Balochistan province of Pakistan. It is 1,400 metres (4,700 ft) above sea level.

== Demographics ==
=== Population ===
Historical population
Year	Pop.	±% p.a.
1951	4,437	—
1961	5,519	+2.21%
1972	7,157	+2.39%
1981	10,482	+4.33%
1998	25,450	+5.36%
2017	47,098	+3.29%
2023	56,613	+3.11%

According to 2023 census, Loralai had a population of 56,613, compared to 47,098 in 2017.

Languages

Languages of Loralai (2023 Census)
1. Pashto (86.1%)
2. Saraiki (4.15%)
3. Punjabi (3.25%)
4. Balochi (3.20%)
5. Urdu (2.10%)
6. Others (1.20%)

Religious groups in Loralai City (1941 & 2017) (Note: 1941: Data for the entirety of the town of Loralai, which included Loralai Municipality and Loralai Cantonment.)
Religious group	1941		2017	
Religious group	Pop.	%	Pop.	%
Islam	2,327	45.67%	53,777	98.05%
Hinduism	1,536	30.15%	526	0.96%
Sikhism	1,116	21.9%	—N/a	—N/a
Christianity	116	2.28%	498	0.91%
Ahmadiyya	—N/a	—N/a	4	0.01%
Others	0	0%	44	0.08%
Total population	5,095	100%	54,849	100%

== Notable people ==
- Raaj Kumar, Bollywood actor

== Locations ==
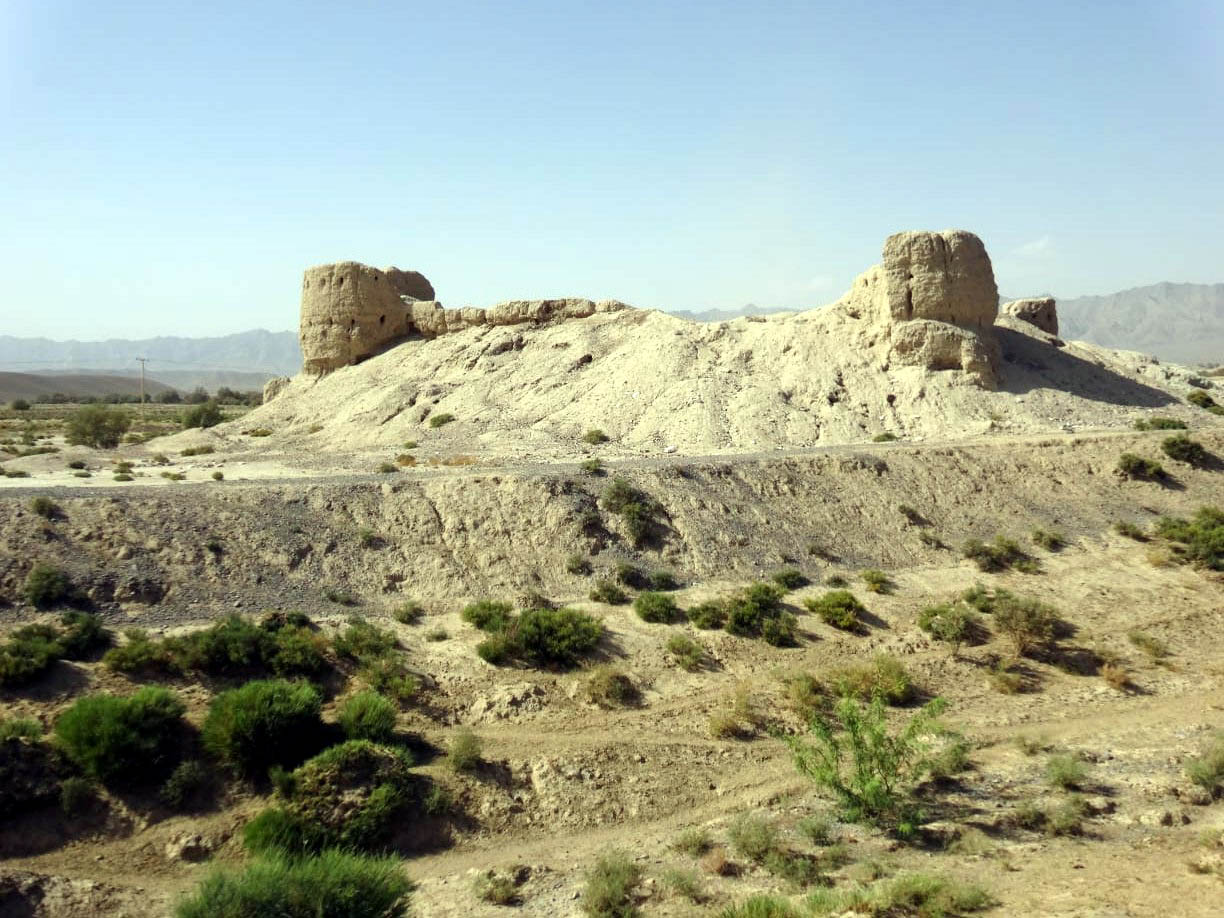
16th century Mughal fort "Mughal qila" in Loralai

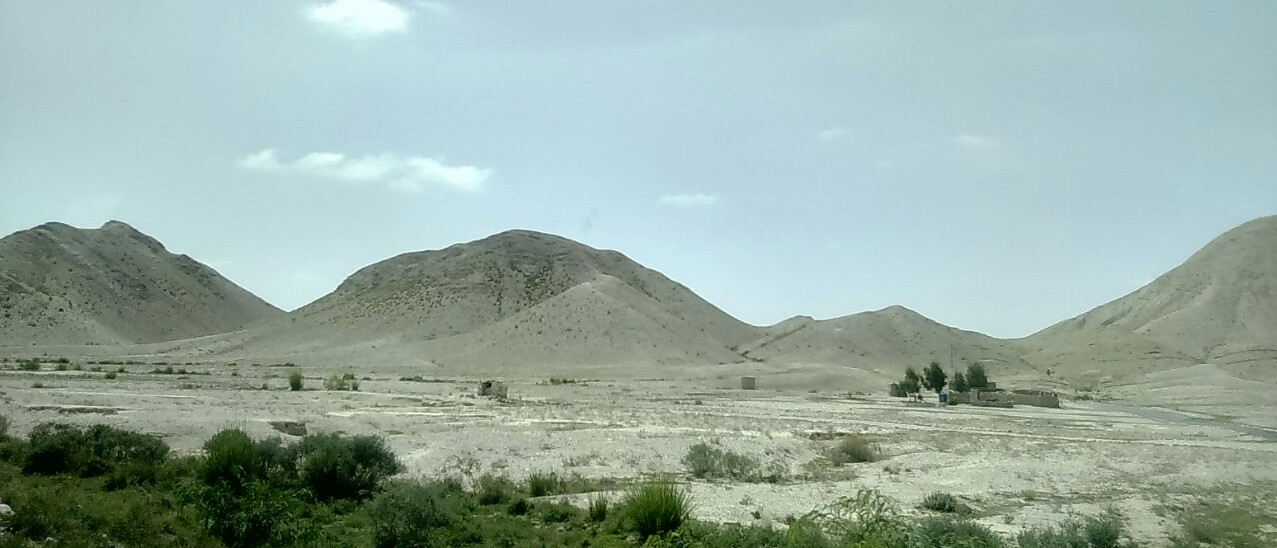
View near Loralai

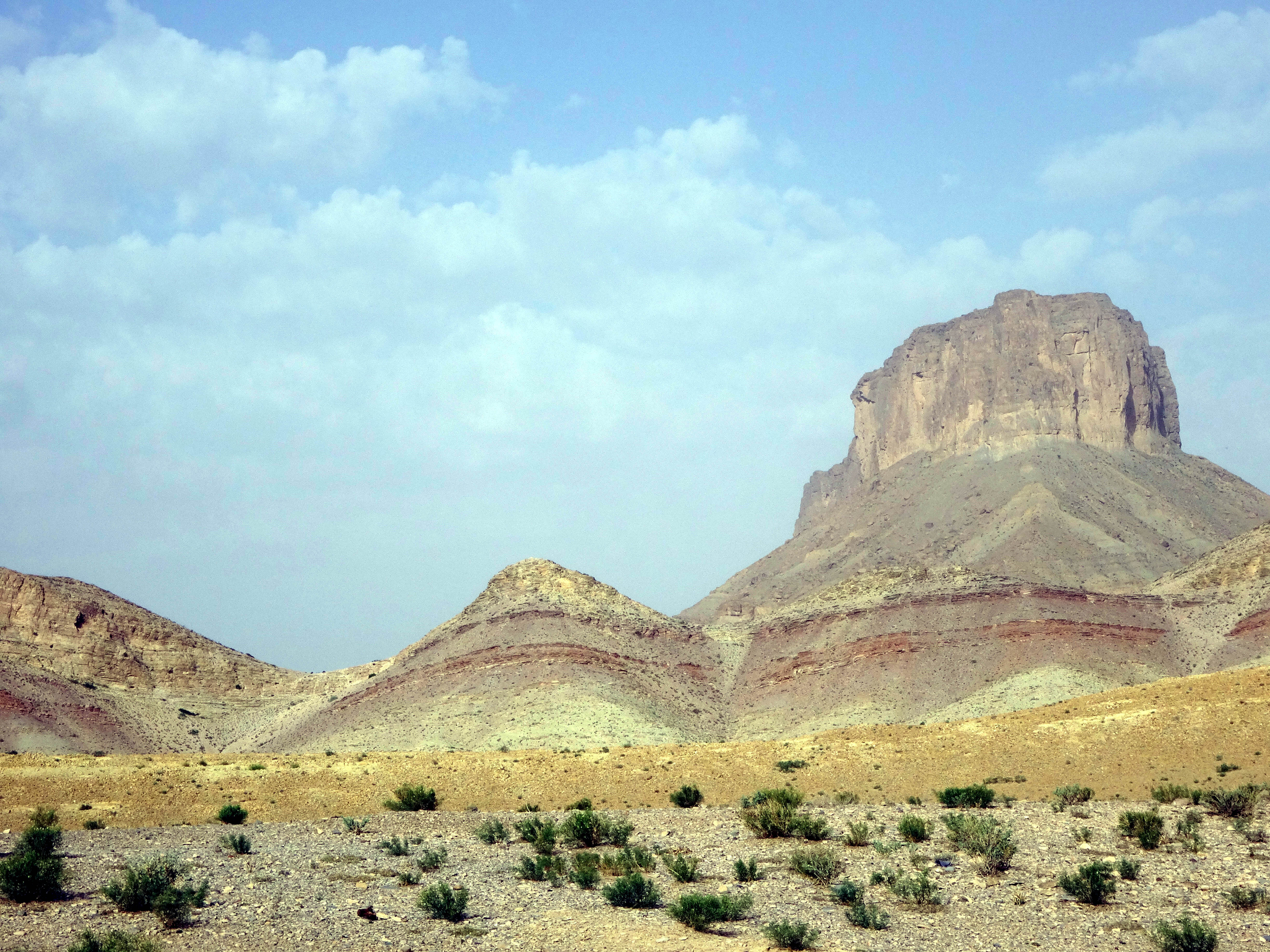
View of Chinjan, about 40 km northwest of Loralai

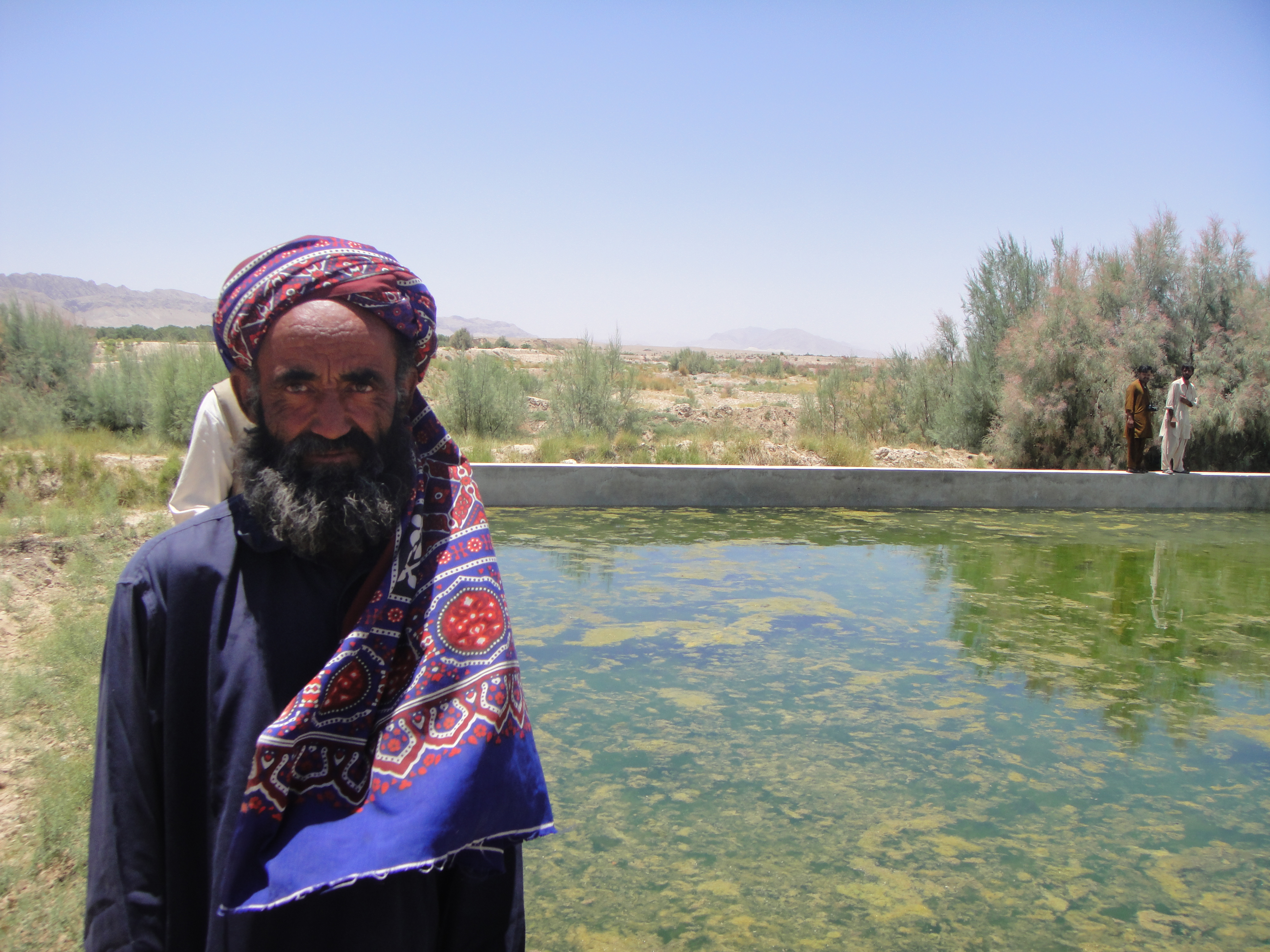
Khardazai, Loralai

== See also ==
- Loralai District
- Pakistan Coal Mines and Resources
- Baran Khan Kudezai
