= Manzoor Pashteen =

Pashtun political activist (born 1994)

- منظور پښتين
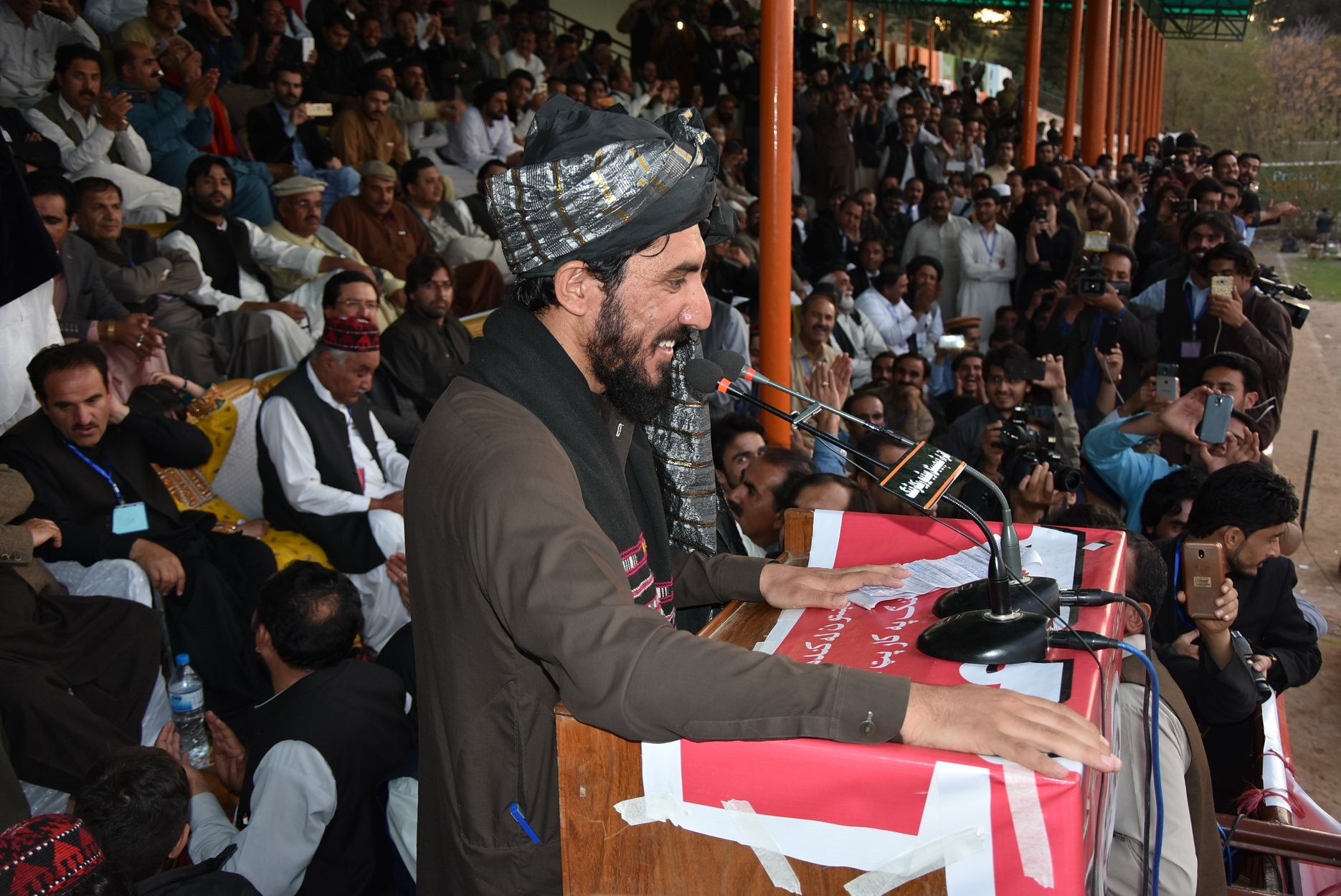
- Pashteen at a PTM rally

Chairman of the Pashtun Protection Movement
- Incumbent
- Assumed office February 2018

Personal details
- Born: October 25, 1994 (age 31) Shahur, Serwekai Tehsil, South Waziristan, Pakistan
- Party: Pashtun Protection Movement
- Relations: Ali Khan Masood (great-uncle)
- Children: 2
- Education: Gomal University
- Occupation: Human rights activist

Manzoor Ahmad Pashteen (Note: Pashto: منظور احمد پښتين; Urdu: منظور احمد پشتین) (born 25 October 1994) is a Pashtun political activist who is the chairman of the Pashtun Tahafuz Movement (PTM), a sociopolitical organization advocating against alleged enforced disappearances, extrajudicial killings, and other human rights abuses against the Pashtun population in Pakistan.

The PTM is focused on the advocacy of rights for Pashtuns in Pakhtunkhwa and Balochistan. From 11 to 14 October 2024, Pashteen was part of the Pashtun National Jirga held in Khyber District to discuss critical issues faced by the Pashtuns.

== Early life and education ==
Pashteen was born in 1994 in Shahur (or Shaheer), Mawle Khan Sarai, a small village near the town of Sarwakai in South Waziristan. The eldest of eight siblings, Pashteen belongs to the Shamankhel Mahsud tribe of the Pashtuns. His father Abdul Wadud Mahsud is a primary school teacher at his village.

Pashteen received his early education at his village's school in South Waziristan. In 2005, Pashteen and his family were forced to flee Waziristan to settle in IDP refugee camps in Dera Ismail Khan, Pakhtunkhwa, due to military operations by the Pakistan Armed Forces against militants. The family fled from their home in Waziristan for a second time in 2007, and returned in 2008, but fled again later that year due to Operation Zalzala. In 2009, he and his family were forced to flee Waziristan for the fourth time because of Operation Rah-e-Nijat.

Pashteen completed his secondary education at an army public school in Bannu, and higher secondary education in Karak. His father was determined to ensure his education. "Only I know", Pashteen said, "my father borrowed money for my schooling and only I know how much we have suffered". Pashteen received his Doctor of Veterinary Medicine degree in 2016 in Gomal University, Dera Ismail Khan. When he and his family returned to Waziristan in 2016, they found their books were looted, their home ruined, and landmines were scattered over their lands.

== Pashtun Tahafuz Movement ==
In May 2014, during his studies at Gomal University, Pashteen founded the "Mahsud Tahafuz Movement", a social movement mainly focused on removing landmines from Waziristan (especially Mahsud land).

The Pashtun Tahafuz Movement also campaigns against war, blaming both Islamist militants and the Pakistani military for the destruction. The region has been a war zone since the 1980s, during events of the Cold War between the Soviet Union and United States, and the following conflict between western and Islamist forces.

The Ministry of Interior, Government of Pakistan in its notification, dated 6 October 2024, added the PTM into list of proscribed organizations citing public order and security in the country.

=== Pashtun Long March ===
The PTM gained prominence after Naqeebullah Mehsud, accused of militant connections, was killed by police in Karachi on January 20, 2018. Human rights groups note the war on terrorism has served as a pretense for authorities to persecute Pashtuns, with thousands of young Pashtuns like Mehsud killed or abducted by authorities on shaky charges. Due to their dominance in the Taliban, Pashtuns overall have been branded as Islamists or militants.

On January 26, 2018, Pashteen and his 20 companions began a protest march from Dera Ismail Khan. Many people joined the march along the way, and it reached Peshawar on January 28. Upon reaching Islamabad on February 1, the Pashtun Tahafuz Movement organized a sit-in called an "All Pashtun National Jirga". The jirga condemned the fake encounter killing of Naqeebullah Mehsud, a 27-year old Pashtun shopkeeper from Waziristan, perpetrated by the Karachi Police under Rao Anwar Ahmed Khan. Among other demands, the jirga also appealed the government to set up a judicial inquiry for Naqeebullah Mehsud, and for all the other Pashtuns murdered extrajudicially in police encounters. On 13 March 2018, Human Rights Watch seconded the call to investigate Mehsud's killers and called on the Pakistani government to drop criminal cases against Manzoor Pashteen and other protest leaders.

There was a grand gathering of PTM in the center of Khyber Pakhtunkhwa, Peshawar on 8 April 2018.

=== Ongoing activism ===
The PTM demands an end to the extrajudicial killings and disappearances, and what they allege to be the Pakistani military establishment's policy of labeling Taliban groups as either "good" or "bad" depending on whether they support the state of Pakistan. A PTM official accused both state institutions and the 'good Taliban' of threatening the PTM. They also demand the removal of landmines from northwestern tribal areas, and that the army cease demolishing houses of Pashtuns accused of militant ties.

In 2019, following the Kharqamar incident, a clash on 26 May between PTM supporters and Pakistani troops that left at least 13 dead, Pashteen spoke to Deutsche Welle in an interview. He accused authorities of firing on demonstrators and suppressing media reports, as well as attempting to rig elections in tribal areas where PTM candidates were likely to win. He denied anti-state and anti-Pakistan sentiment, saying the PTM is anti-terrorism, while accusing the army of involvement in such activities.

Manzoor Pashteen and the PTM have been vocal about civilian deaths resulting from Pakistan's "war on terror" in which many innocent civilians lost their lives in Northwestern Pakistan during air campaigns. A number of cases highlighted by the PTM and investigated independently by the BBC came to light in a 2019 report titled "Uncovering Pakistan's secret human rights abuses". Reacting to the report, Pashteen told the BBC, "It has taken us almost 15 years of suffering and humiliation to gather courage to speak up, and to spread awareness about how the military trampled our constitutional rights through both direct action and a policy of support for the militants."

Ahead of the jirga to be held in October 2024 that attracted a large number of leaders, according to Manzoor Pashteen, his rights movement’s teams were subjected to physical harassment by the Pakistan state authorities during surveys in the tribal region. He said, "Jirga is an integral part of our [Pashtun] culture and nobody will be allowed to prevent us from holding them for the resolution of our grievances.”

=== Detentions ===
On 5 September 2017, Pashteen and his father, along with two other human rights activists, Jamal Malyar and Shah Faisal Ghazi, were detained by Pakistani security forces at Barwand check post in Tiarza Tehsil, South Waziristan. Pashteen was beaten up under the allegation that his human rights campaign damaged military morale. “I said, you are building your morale by killing innocent children and then calling us terrorists,” Pashteen later told. As a result of the social media campaign for them by their supporters, they were released on 6 September by the military.

On 27 January 2020, Pashteen was arrested by the police in Peshawar on allegations of sedition. The arrest was criticized by then Afghan President Ashraf Ghani. Human Rights Watch (HRW) urged Pakistani authorities to release Pashteen and drop the charges against him, saying "using criminal laws to chill free expression and political opposition has no place in a democracy." During a protest against the arrest outside the National Press Club in Islamabad on 28 January, PTM leader and member of the National Assembly Mohsin Dawar, Ismat Shahjahan and Ammar Rashid of the Awami Workers Party (AWP), and 26 other protesters were arrested. Ismat Shahjahan and Mohsin Dawar were released on 29 January but Ammar Rashid and 22 others were sent to jail on sedition charges; all charges were dropped against them on 17 February. On 2 February, at least 43 activists were briefly arrested from other protests held in solidarity with Pashteen in Dera Ismail Khan, Karachi and Faisalabad. After almost a month in jail, Pashteen was released on 25 February and was received by a large number of PTM workers.

On 28 March 2021, the police arrested Pashteen in Kohat and Mohsin Dawar in Karak to prevent both of them from travelling to Bannu to join and lead the Janikhel protest march. The protest was called off on 29 March after an agreement was signed between the protesters and Mahmood Khan, the Chief Minister of Khyber Pakhtunkhwa, following which Pashteen and Dawar were released.

On December 4, 2023, Pashteen was arrested under mysterious circumstances. He was enroute to Turbat, where Baloch activists were protesting state-inflicted injustices when, according to eyewitnesses, Pakistani forces fired at his vehicle, injuring a passerby. He was then arrested. On December 6, his supporters assembled outside the White House, advocating for his safe release. On December 7, an Islamabad court granted a seven-day remand for Pashteen, arrested in Chaman on Monday. His lawyer claimed Pashteen was "abducted" from Balochistan and produced in court three days later, citing an alleged car attack. Despite opposition, the court ordered police to present Pashteen again on December 14.

== Controversy ==
Many Afghan activists support the PTM in solidarity for Pashtuns in both Afghanistan and Pakistan. The Afghan government has praised Pashteen's work, with President Ashraf Ghani supporting the march in February, leading some groups to accuse him and the PTM of "foreign backing". In May 2019 Major General Asif Ghafoor, serving as a spokesman for the Pakistani military, alleged Indian and Afghan intelligence agencies were funding the PTM.

Pashteen has rejected the allegations of being a foreign agent for the Research and Analysis Wing (RAW) of India or the National Directorate of Security of Afghanistan. In another instance, following the Asma Jahangir Conference held in Lahore, Manzoor Pashteen was booked under terrorism charges by Pakistani authorities for provoking resistance against the armed forces and the state institutions during his speech.

During the recent organization of the Pashtun National Court by the Pashtun Tahafuz Movement (PTM) in Khyber District on 12 October 2024, the internationally proscribed terrorist organization Tehreek-i-Taliban Pakistan (TTP), in an unprecedented move, announced a unilateral temporary ceasefire in the region in anticipation of the event, which gave rise to speculations regarding an emerging nexus between the proscribed terrorist organization and PTM leadership.

== Taqin hat ==
Pashteen usually wears the Taqin hat (also Mazari hat) at public events and rallies leading to the cap being known as "Pashteen cap" in many areas of Khyber Pakhtunkhwa.

== See also ==
- Asma Jahangir
- Human Rights Commission of Pakistan
- Asma Jahangir Conference
- Pakistan
