= Mahsud =

Pashtun tribe

محسود
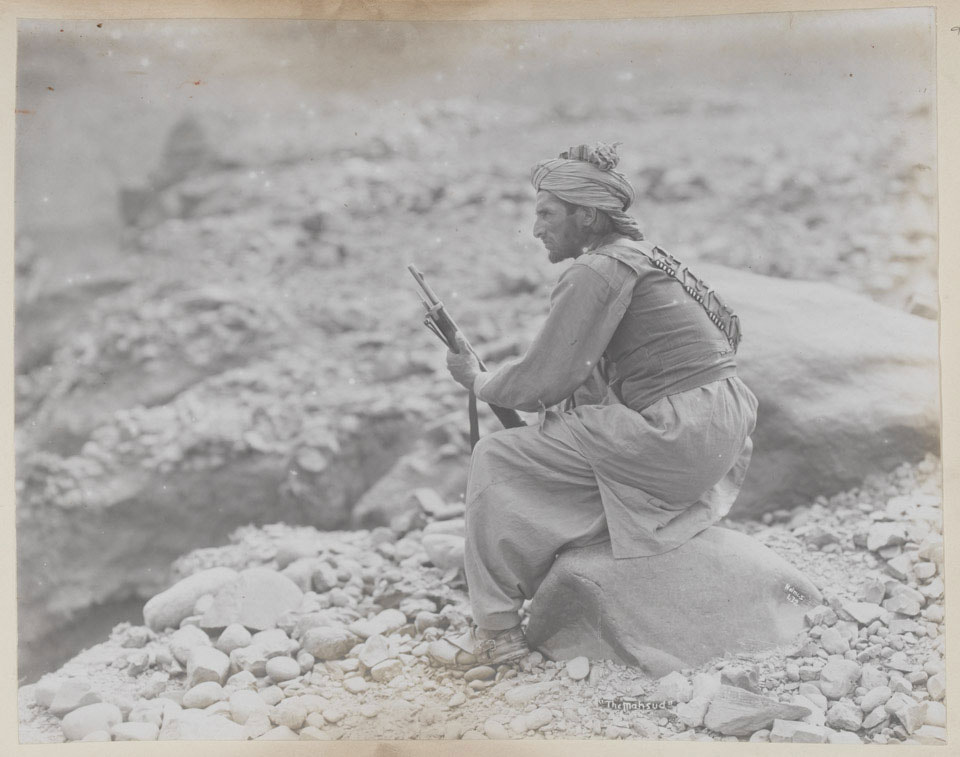
- A Pashtun of the Mehsud tribe during the anti-British War in Waziristan, 1919

Languages
- Pashto

Religion
- Sunni Islam

Related ethnic groups
- Wazir, Orakzai, Afridi, Zadran, Mangal Zazai and other Karlani Pashtun tribes

The Mahsud (Pashto: محسود), also spelled as Mahsood, Mehsud and other variants, is a tribe of Pashtuns belonging to the Karlani confederacy, and inhabiting mostly the South Waziristan district of Khyber Pakhtunkhwa, Pakistan.

The Mahsud are divided into three great clans or subtribes, namely Alizai, Bahlolzai, and Shamankhel. Each tribe has his own Khan. A minor number of Mahsud are settled in the Logar Province of Afghanistan, especially in Charkh District, Baraki barak and Muhammad Agha, but also in Wardak, Ghazni and Kunduz Provinces. The Mahsuds also inhabit the center and north of South Waziristan valley, surrounded on three sides by the Darweshkhel Wazirs, and being shut off by the Bettanis Pashtun tribe on the east from the Derajat and Bannu districts. Two Pashtun tribes, the Ahmadzai Wazirs and the Mahsuds, inhabit and dominate South Waziristan.

Within the heart of Mahsud territory in South Waziristan lies the influential Ormur (Burki) tribe's stronghold of Kaniguram. The Ormurs are considered by other tribes of South Waziristan to be close brethren of the Mahsuds due to marital and other ties and the fact that the Ormurs have lived in and controlled Kaniguram for over a thousand years. There are also some Mahsuds living in the UAE, Germany and the United Kingdom.

== History ==
The Mahsuds originally lived in the centre of Waziristan area of FATA. In the later 14th century, they migrated eastwards. Eventually, the Mahsuds settled at the center of Waziristan, in the Makeen, Kaniguram and Lada area.

During the British colonial period, the Mahsuds were invaded by the British Empire, in 1925's Pink's War, in 1860, 1881, 1894–95, 1900–01 and in The Waziristan Campaign which ensued after the Afghan War of Independence In the words of Sir Olaf Caroe, who acted as the former governor of the British Indian Frontier, "The Maseed tribe are a people who can never even think of submitting to a foreign power." From 1860 to 1937, the British forces repeatedly attacked Mahsuds positions but never got a foothold in the area.

== Primary locations ==
South Waziristan, Mahsud inhabited Area.

The Mahsuds tribe inhabits a large portion of the center of Waziristan, which is drained by the Tank Zam and Shahur Rivers. The Mahsuds territory is a rough triangle between Jandola, the hills north of Razmak, and from Shuidar to Janimela, north of Wana. No portion of their territory touches the "settled" districts, and the tribe is surrounded on the north and west by the Wazirs, on the east by the Bhittanis, and on the south by the Wazirs and Shranis.

Except for a few Shabi Khel in the Bannu District, some land near Gumal in the Tank Tehsil, and the colonies at Chark and elsewhere in the Logar Valley in Afghanistan, none of the Mahsuds own land outside of South Waziristan Agency. To escape the severe cold in the higher hills during the winter, a large number move down to the lower valleys but always keep within the Mahsuds territorial limits. Many of these people live in caves or tents.
"South Waziristan is mountainous with several high peaks; Pirghal, for example, being 11,600 feet. The Gomal is the main river, in addition to which there are many hill torrents, which remain dry for most of the year."
The mountains and valleys geographically isolate the Mahsuds from large-scale movements of invaders and provide opportunities to conduct effective ambushes on enemies. The cave villages along the Shahur River near Barwand and along the Split Toi provide excellent hiding places and defensive positions.

== Culture ==
It is a tribal society having its own subculture. Nearly all Mahsud follow Islamic traditions, celebrate the same holidays, dress the same, consume the same food, listen to the same music and are multi-lingual to a certain extent. In the southern and eastern region, Mehsuds live in accordance with the Pashtun culture and are usually bilingual in maseedwola also known as maseedo.

=== Migratory patterns ===
Many Mahsuds live in the lower valleys during the winter. They return to family compounds at higher elevations during the summer.

== Key terrain features ==
Valleys: Makeen, Wacha Khwara, Ladha, Baddar, Darra Algad, Khaisara, Mastang, Shaktu, Sheranna, Split Toi, Tak Zam

Plains: Razmak Malik Allah Neer:velleys Kotkai

Mountains: Kundeygaar, Pre Ghal, Spin Ghar, Spinkamar

Rivers: Tak Zam, Gomal, Shahur, Shinkai Toi, Baddar Toi, Split Toi, Lower Khaisara Toi, Tauda China, Kundygar, Osspass, Karrama, Torwam, Thangi Parkhai

=== Climate ===
The climate in the region is hot in summer, with high temperatures around 43 °C (110 °F), and cool in winter, with low temperatures around 2 °C (35 °F). There is modest rainfall in July and August and in January and February.

== Recent history ==
Mahsud Tribal Family hierarchical tree

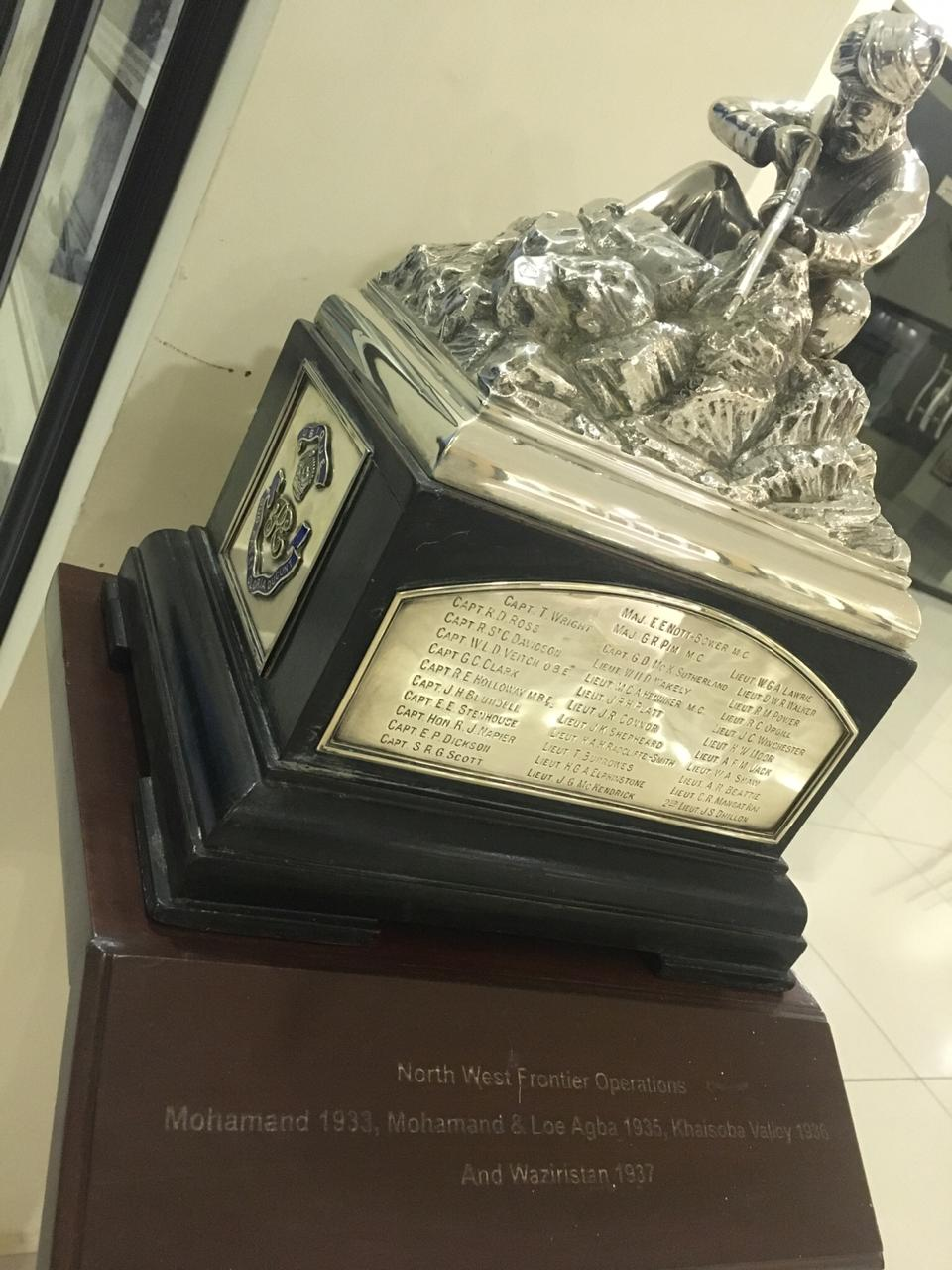
Souvenir presented by British Officers who took part in Waziristan operation of 1937 depicting Tribal Marksman in an ambush against invading British Indian Forces.

On many occasions, the Afghan throne was saved with the help of the Mahsuds/Maseeds (like General Ramzan Khan Maseed Shamankhel, Shabaram Khan Machikhel, Bakhan Mahsuds, Mosa Khan Maseed, Miajee Maseed, Jagar Maseed etc.), Burki/Baraki, and Wazirs from Waziristan, Pakistan. Of those who fought during this time, most came back to their homeland, but those who stayed were given high ranks of office, such as Faiz Muhammad Maseed, who was appointed as an interior minister during the Reign of Daud Khan in the 1970s. Today a minority of Mahsuds are still in Logar Province, with the title of Waziri, but by caste, they are Maseeds. The majority of these are with a sub-caste of Malik Denai, Dramankel, Faridi, Shamirai شمیرائی, Shabi khel, etc. When the Soviet–Afghan War started, some of these families came back to Waziristan but could not stay there, so they moved to cities like Peshawar and Karachi. Some of them stayed in Waziristan and D.I. Khan. The Mahsuds helped in defeating the British invading troops and saved Afghanistan, they contributed a lot because Afghanistan was nearly in the hands of the British.

John Ayde described the Maseeds:

They are poor but brave… and although turbulent and difficult to deal with, still have a great love of their country and cherish their independence, possessing qualities that we admire ourselves, and which deserve consideration and respect.

Maseed are very good marksmen and have a reputation of trustworthiness. Maseed is the most independent of all the tribes. Even their own maliks have very limited control over them. However, Maseed have been increasingly integrated within Pakistani society since independence.

Sir Olaf Caroe in his book published just after partition of the British India about Mahsuds

They hold aloof, and are continually engaged in aggressive warfare against their Wazir cousins, at whose expense they have encroached to acquire new lands. And to those who know both tribes, they present a different appearance. Pass along a road which is being used by babirs, or caravans, of these tribes- men, and it is not so hard to distinguish one from the other, not by his dress, for that is much the same, but by something indefinable in his air and carriage. The nearest I can get to it is to liken the Mahsud to a wolf, the Wazir to a panther. Both are splendid creatures; the panther is slier, sleeker and has more grace, the wolf-pack is more purposeful, more united and more dangerous.

The Saintly Poet of the East (Dr. Allama Iqbal) has also prayed for the dominant Waziri and Mahsud tribes of Waziristan

Sher Shah Suri has so well said:

The distinction of tribes is the cause of all ruin.

Waziris and Mahsuds are names dearest to heart;

Alas! They feel no pride in being Afghans.

The Muslims of the mountains are divided into thousand tribes,

And every tribe has its own idol.

The same sanctuary is filled with Lat and Manat;

May God grant you power to break them all.

Zarb-e-Kaleem (Iqbal)

In 1850, Lewat's tribesmen the Great Baromi's (Shabi Khel) defeated 3,000 British troops with only 300 fighters, using guerrilla tactics by attacking the British in the Valley of Bobar (Waziristan) from all sides with outdated rifles and swords. This attack demoralized the British and made them fearful of the Mahsuds. Survivors of this attack reported that the sight of the Mahsud tribesmen charging at them (with loud roars and wearing long hair and beards like Lions) affected them mentally.

In 1860, three thousand Mahsud tribesmen attacked the British regiment base in Tank (present South Waziristan). The British struggled to defeat them.

In 1897, Mujahed tribesmen again stood up against the British all the way from Quetta kakar, and the British experienced difficulty when engaging them. It was during this time that the name of Mulla Powinda [Jagar Draman Khil][Miajee] [Laly Malik Denai] [Mulla ShaSaleem kaka] emerged. Powindah comes from the Pashto language, meaning "nomad".

Day after day, Mulla Powinda grew more popular and famous. His right-hand mulla Shasaleem Kaka Machikhel was popular among Wazirs and Mahsud tribes. He emerged as a legendary figure among the people of the region and beyond. There was even a time the British considered him to be the sole leader of the Waziristan country. His followers would sporadically kill individual British officers. However, the British were not able to capture the attackers, who would return to their mountain hideouts. All attempts to stop those attacks were unsuccessful.

In 1907, the Wazir and Mahsud tribesmen were blocked from entry into any government-controlled territory. Economic sanctions were imposed, blocking even basic amenities, such as food and medicine. The British commander of that time blockaded the areas of Makeen and Kaniguram. Various areas were searched to arrest Mulla Powinda without success. The British thought that the tribesmen were receiving weapons by sea, from the coast of Balochistan and responded by creating checkposts, but no weapons were confiscated.

Mulla Powindah died in 1913. It could be said that he was the crownless emperor of one of the most fearsome of the Pashtun Tribes, the Mahsuds. Upon his death, his son Shah Fazal Din was given leadership and his son-in-law, Mulla Abdul Hakeem Kakar, was appointed his adviser. They have good relations with Amir Abdul Rahman Khan, the Amir of Afghanistan.

When World War I started in 1915, the British were concerned that they would be engaged in battle on more than one front. This was a threat to their safety and economy, so they decided to close those fronts of lesser significance. They abandoned their ‘Forward Policy’ for the time being and sent a message of friendship and peace to the tribes. The tribes did not trust the British and rejected these peace proposals. Instead, the Mahsud assembled a militia to attack the British.

By this time, the British had established an air force in the subcontinent, which was used to harass the tribesmen, and as a result the tribe's hatred of the British increased. As a result of their suffering, they were bent upon taking revenge, and hence their morale increased. A series of attacks were made by the Mahsuds, inflicting heavy losses on the enemy. The attack on the Marhatta Regiment resulted in the deaths of hundreds of sepoys and five British Officers. In the attack on the Punjab Regiment, the Mahsud warriors slaughtered everyone. The aerial bombardments had inflicted significant losses on the tribesmen, but they were content that they were also doing well and had killed around 250 of the enemy forces.

After the end of World War I, the British returned to Waziristan. This time, they built roads and forts throughout the land. The sophistication and constant patrols of the British Air Force helped create a secure atmosphere for their ground troops. With this sense of security, the British Army constructed a road from Jandola to Ladha. At Razmak, they constructed a cantonment for their army officers and soldiers.

By 1922–23, all the British forces had moved from Wana to Razmak. They had constructed an airport there and instead of flying all the way from India, their aircraft would fly from Razmak Airport and bomb the countryside. Because of this, the countryside of Makeen was totally devastated. The Mahsud deemed it appropriate at this time to agree to a ceasefire because this new British tactic was inflicting widespread losses on their side. The ceasefire, they imagined, would also enable them to devise a strategy for countering the latest British advances.

In 1925, the Royal Air Force successfully put down a Maseed rebellion by strafing the tribes' mountain strongholds. The action, which came to be known as Pink's War led to the tribal leaders seeking peace terms.

In 1927 Ghazi Ramadan Khan Mahsud attacked Wana camp with a huge lashkar (tribal militia). The result was a major loss for the British Army. In 1928 Ghazi Ramadan Khan Mahsud re-assembled his lashkar again for his next attack, on Sararogha Fort. This time he attacked with a powerful force, killed all of the defending soldiers (numbering 300) and took hold of the Fort.

=== Lashkar invasion of Kashmir ===
Immediately after Pakistan came into existence, Mahsuds raised a tribal militia under Gaideen Khan Abdullai which entered Kashmir to help the newly created state Pakistan to capture Kashmir. They quickly reached Baramulla town, instead of pressing on to the capital, Srinagar, to seize Kashmir completely.

A large number of tribals from Pakistan attacked Kashmir under the code name "Operation Gulmarg" to seize Kashmir. The invading tribals started moving along Rawalpindi-Murree-Muzaffarabad-Baramulla Road on 22 October 1947 with Muzaffarabad fell on 24 October 1947. They reached and captured Baramulla on 25 October 1947.

=== Culture ===
Pir Roshan is the first person who founded the Pashto alphabet. He was born in Kanygram of Waziristan. The Roshani Ghorzang was one of the great revolutions in the land of Pshtonkhwa. Mula Shasleem kaka, Mula Pawenda Maseed and Haji Mirza Ali Khan Fight several years for the unity of both side Pashtons.

=== Jarga ===
Mahsuds have a Mahsuds Jarga for large problems. The Jarga is a tribal assembly of elders which takes decisions by consensus, particularly among the Pashtun people.

=== Music and Attan ===
Attan, is the famous dance of Mahsud tribe. Dhol is also widely used in Waziristan.

== Subtribes ==
Like other Pashtun tribes, the Mahsud tribe also has its own individual subtribes and clans:

- Shaman Khel
- Manzai
- Balizai
- Jalal khel (or Jalali) (Pashto:جلال خېل) (Dari:جلال خیل)

These subtribes are then divided into more clans amongst themselves.

== Notable Mahsuds ==
- Abdullah Mehsud, military commander of the Tehrik-i-Taliban
- Alamzaib Mahsud, activist for missing persons and landmine victims in the tribal areas
- Baitullah Mehsud, founder and first emir of the Tehreek-e-Taliban Pakistan (TTP)
- Hakimullah Mehsud, second emir of the TTP
- Mustafa Pashteen, Human rights activist of PTM
- Kamal Mahsud, Pashto folk singer
- Manzoor Pashteen, chairman of the Pashtun Tahafuz Movement
- Mulla Powinda, Pashtun religious freedom fighter who led Jihād against British India
- Naqeebullah Mehsud, Pashtun martyred in police encounter
- Noor Wali Mehsud, fourth emir of the TTP
- Said Alam Mahsud, political activist
- Salahuddin Khan Mehsud, Inspector-General for Khyber Pakhtunkhwa Police
- Zaman Mehsud, assassinated journalist

== See also ==
- Mahsud Attan
- Pashtun Tahafuz Movement
