= Pashtun culture =

Culture of Pashtun people

Pashtun culture (Pashto: پښتني هڅوب or پښتون کلتور) is primarily rooted in Pashtunwali, Pashtuns are traditionally strict and conservative regarding the preservation of their culture. an ancient indigenous honor code, alongside the preservation of the Pashto language and traditional Pashtun attire.

As the foundational framework for social behavior and governance within the Pashtun tribal society, Pashtunwali emphasizes collective core tenets such as hospitality (Melmastia), asylum (Nanawatai), and justice. Consequently, Pashtuns traditionally maintain a highly conservative approach toward preserving their distinct heritage, community structures, and customary practices against external assimilation.

== Pashtunwali as a social code of honor ==
Being the world's largest tribal ethnicity, Pashtun society is guarded by a code of common rules, customs and social behaviors, known collectively as Pashtunwali. The code is based on personal honor and promotes courage, self-respect, independence, leadership, justice and hospitality.

=== Hospitality ===
Hospitality (Pashto: مېلمستيا, romanized: melmastyā́) is one of the core tenets of the Pashtunwali. Historically, it was not regarded as just good manners, but a social obligation. Travelers in Pashtunistan record being provided food, shelter and protection regardless of being known to the host. This was first noted in English by Mountstuart Elphinstone in 1815 who said "The most remarkable characteristic of the Afghans is their hospitality. The practice of this virtue is so much a point of national honor, that their reproach to an inhospitable man is that he has no Pushtunwali."

Almost 100 years later, this was expanded on by British writer and orientalist Theodore Leighton Pennell, who noted that this generosity even extended to former enemies, he goes to explain that the host assumed responsibility for him and risked his life to defend him.

My plan was, therefore, to put myself entirely in their hands, and let them see that I was trusting to their sense of honour and to their traditional treatment of a guest for my safety.

During one journey he stayed overnight in a village in the North West Frontier occupied by numerous outlaws. Although some younger men reportedly wished to kill him during the night, the village elders refused to allow any harm to come to their guest. As one elder explained:

See, he has trusted himself entirely to our protection, and because he trusts us he is sleeping so soundly; therefore, no harm must be done to him in our village.

The hospitality is also a two-way-street, as Pennell notes. He is reluctant to refuse a roast mutton and pilao meal cooked by his host, lest it be considered an insult to his hospitality. He also comments that it is ironic that some men would practice this faithful hospitality whilst stealing from others; Hospitality occupied a unique place within Afghan moral life. Even among men whom he elsewhere describes as outlaws, raiders, or professional thieves.

=== Vendetta ===
Another principle of the Pashtunwali is vendetta (Pashto: نياو او بدل, romanized: nyāw aw badál). Winston Churchill took note of this during his service in British India, writing:

The Pashtun tribes are always engaged in private or public war. Every man is a warrior, a politician and a theologian. Every large house is a real feudal fortress. ... Every family cultivates its vendetta; every clan, its feud. ... Nothing is ever forgotten and very few debts are left unpaid.

Winston Churchill (My Early Life, Chapter 11: "The Mahmund Valley")

Vengeance was often perused with patience. An avenger might wait months or years for an opportunity, according to Pennell. He supplants this with the story of a tribal chief who refused to open a particular window in his tower because his cousin had been watching it for months in the hope of shooting him. Some months later, Pennell records, the chief inadvertently approached the window and "had been shot there by his cousin." "Revenge is a word sweet to the Afghan ear" says Pennell.

== Traditional dress and clothing ==
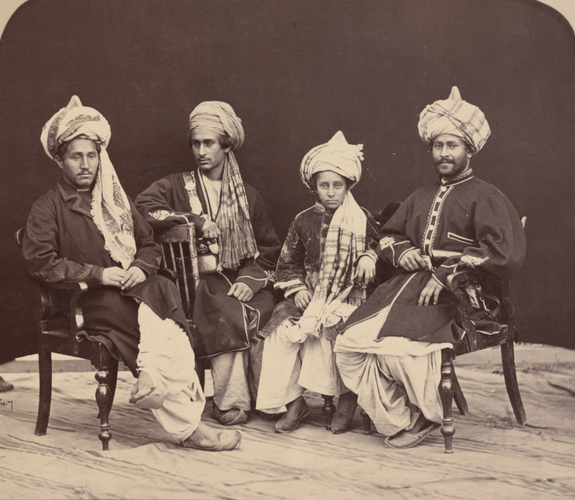
Pushtun Nawabs

=== Headwear and turbans ===
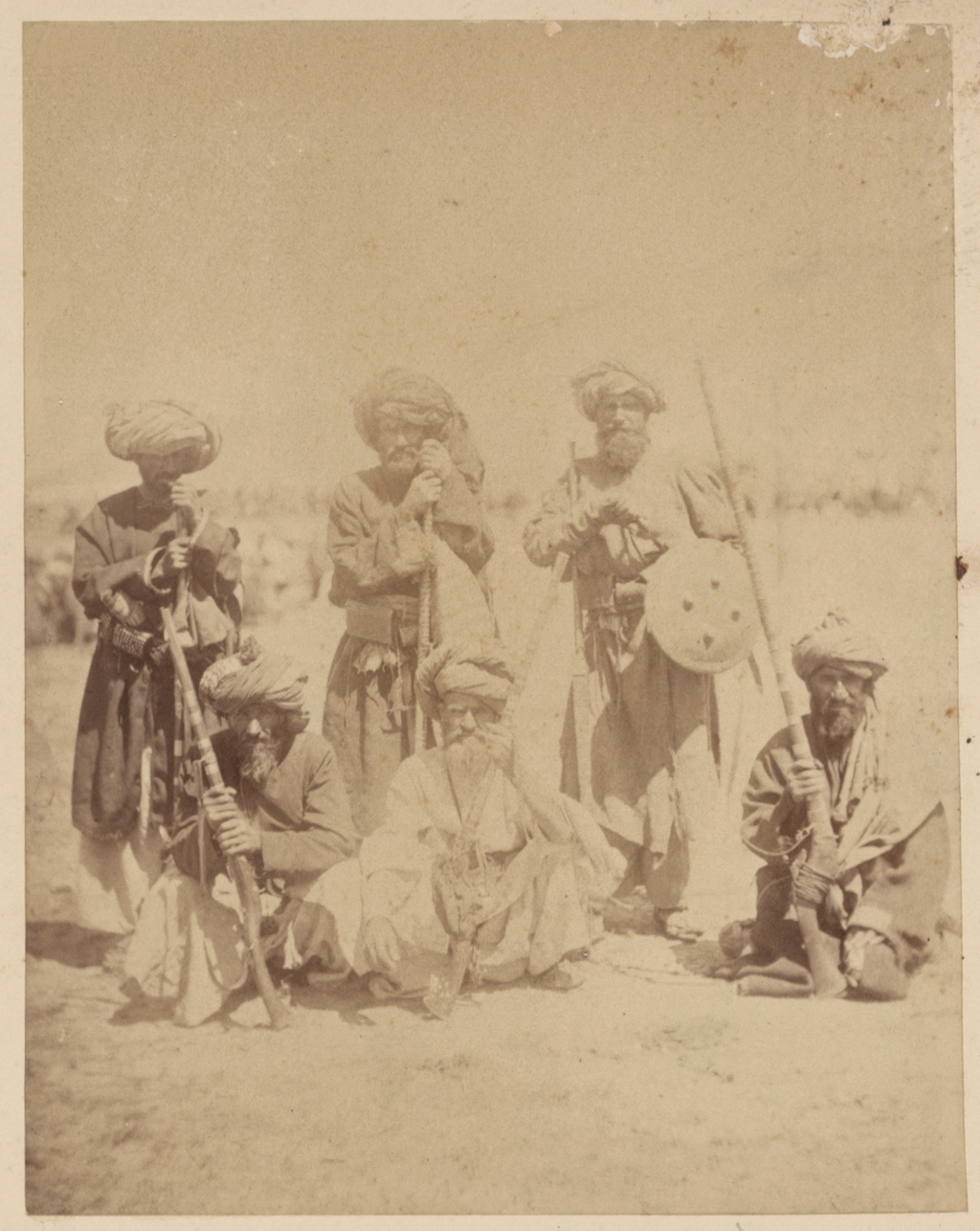
Pushtun men wearing turbans (their traditional headwear)

One of the trademark and historical headwear of Pashtun men is an adorned turban (Pashto: شمله, romanized: shamla) wrapped tightly around a hat with one of its ends loose over the shoulders, a sure sign and recognition of a Pashtun. The turban itself has been a symbol of pride and the center of many Pashto proverbs. However, it should be mentioned that different tribes have different types of turbans unique to them, as such tribal styles have been persevered for centuries. They are worn in everyday life by male elders, adults and tribal leaders as sign of status and respect. The common turban comes in a spectrum of colors with unique striped patterns. These styles are uniquely associated with Pashtuns throughout Central and South Asia. However, other Afghan ethnic groups have also however adopted the Pashtun turban style.

=== Women's clothing ===
Traditionally modest, Pashtun women when in public, or when visiting cities or in the presence of men, have observed the Burka, a garment worn by some Muslim women around the world. They cover themselves with burka from head to toe, whilst leaving latticed slits, or nets to see through. It is made from cotton and comes in a variety of colors such as blue, white, brown and black. The burka is an essential part of Pashtun culture as it conveys honor and respect to others, in society, however it is not worn by children, young girls or elderly women. It may be worn in all Pashtun regions from Afghanistan and Pakistan, as well as by some diaspora women. However, in the presence of their own family members it may be taken off. The burka has historically been associated with women of higher class and suggested women didn't need to work. Many women insist upon wearing it to preserve their self respect and honor

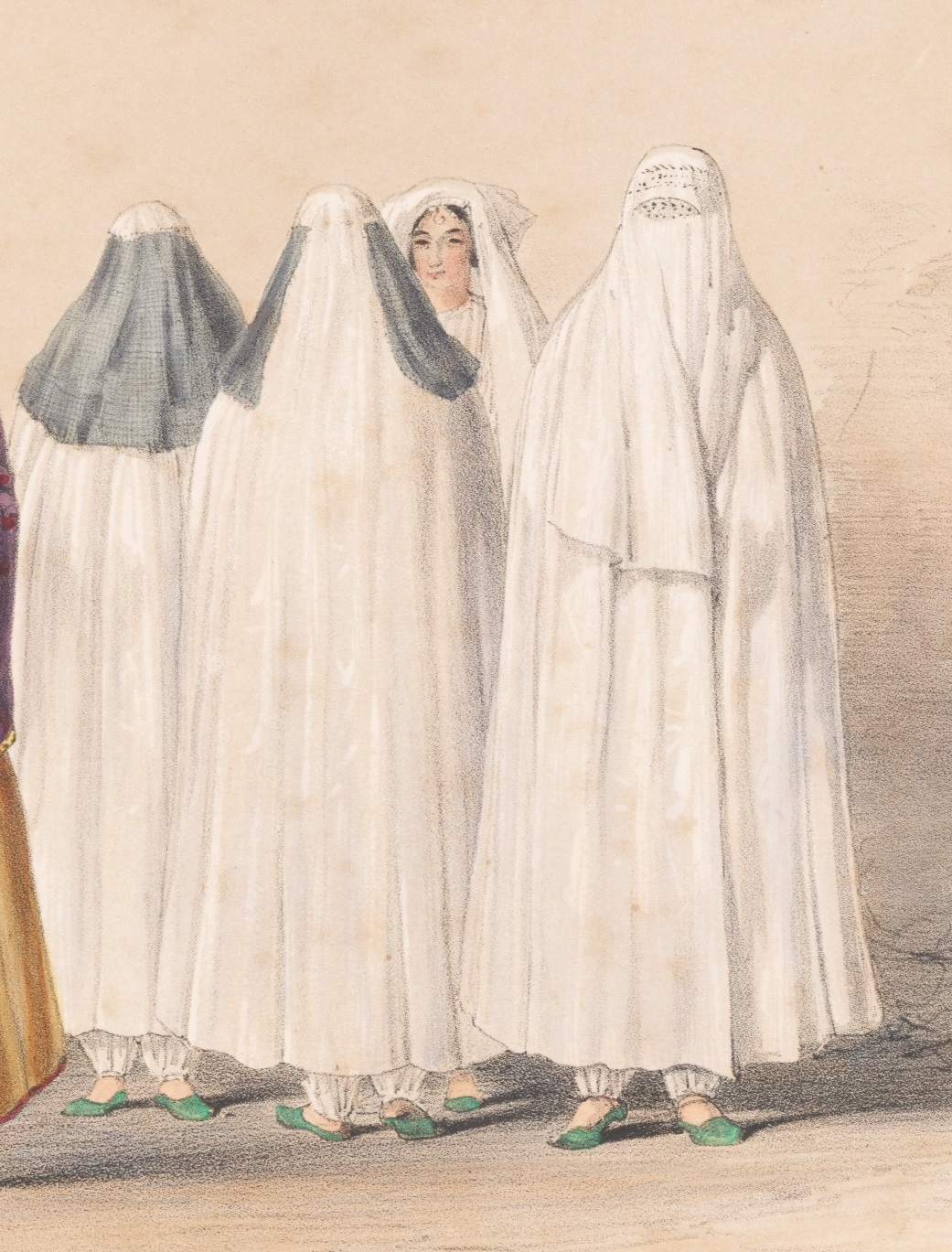
Painting of Pashtun women in traditional burka, Kabul, 18th century

Contrary to the false beliefs and propaganda suggesting it was introduced by Taliban, the earliest recorded mention of Pashtun women wearing the burka was in the early 18th century, by a British soldier of the Bengal Army, James Rattray records that:

When out of doors, or taking Horse exercise, these ladies don an immense white sheet, reaching from the top of the skull cap, to the feet, a long square veil, attached by a clasp of gold, or jewel to the back of the head, conceals the face, across where there is an opening of network to admit light and air. This dress is called a Boorkha. It conceals the whole figure, all outlines which is so entirely lost, that a stranger, on viewing a party of these shrouded beings flitting about him on the streets, might as well be at a loss to guess to what class of creatures they belonged. In addition to the winding sheets, they wear long loose white boots of calico, fastened by a silken garter above the knees and turned back like a falling collar, in order to display the lining. The soles of these baglike leggings are of shawl and the garters, in their glittering tissues bear emblazed holy memorials, acts of zeal, and love recorded eminents from - from the Quran, the loose boots and veils are also embraided in white and coloured silk. They sit aside on horse back generally behind their own husband or one of their own sex

Women typically wear a veil, a long pleated upper garment extending below the knees, loose coloured trousers, often blue or red, and traditional clothing similar to the Khet Partoog. The color of the dress is usually red and is covered with variety of other ornaments. They adorn themselves in various traditional jewelry such as ornamental headpieces, bracelets, nose rings, earrings, necklaces are also worn. Henna is also done of the fingers, feet and hands to beautify themselves

=== Tattoos ===
Amongst the Ghilji tribes of Pashtuns, an ancient tradition exists, the Sheen Khaal, which is regarded as a sign of beauty for women. Sheen Khaal, a tribal custom, are geometric blue facial tattoos on the chin, cheeks, mid-brow, and forehead of Pashtun women. It was once quite common amongst the Ghilji Pashtun women. However, nowadays it is often seen on elder ladies or nomads normally referred to as Kochi. This practice is slowly being abandoned due to the influence of Islam which forbids tattoos and this is also because most of the nomadic Ghilji tribes have slowly have become more settled. Despite this many elderly ladies still have it as well as a few younger ones in Southern Afghanistan. As a substitute, many women now apply Sheen Khaal temporarily with henna on special occasions (e.g., weddings). Different sub-tribes of the Ghilji tribe have different patterns.

== Role of Women ==
The role of women in Pashtun culture has evolved throughout history. One of the earliest accounts documenting this in English thoroughly comes from the author Theodore Leighton Pennell. According to Theodore, they occupied a unique social position governed by established custom and partly by the jealously and harshness of men. Pashtun women were privately influential within the family, he says, and hardworking and frequently moving.

For example one aspect of Pashtun culture he recorded was an etiquette governing the use use of women's names. Married women typically avoided naming themselves, and identified through their eldest son. For example:

- "The mother of Muhammad Ismail."
- "The mother of Taira Lai."

=== Povindah ===
The Povindah were a class of nomadic traders in Pashtunistan that conducted commerce for their tribe. They were frequently described in colonial literature. According to Pennell, they are "splendid specimens of robust womanhood." he attributes this to their workload and physically demanding life, as they would travel hundreds of miles from Khorasan to India or Central Asia to gather goods. Their abilities impressed the British author who wrote:

"The Povindah women—strong, robust, and rosy from the bracing highlands of Khorasan—are dressed almost entirely in black.."

According to Pennel, the Povindah could be distinguished by: black clothing, blue forehead tattoos marks, and silver coin ornaments on the forehead. The women worked the hardest during seasonal migrations.

=== Domestic Labour ===
Pennell provides an detailed accounts of women's daily responsibilities historically in British Pashtunstan. According to him, a typical wife was expected to:

- Grind grain.
- Fetch water.
- Prepare meals.
- Churn milk.
- Milk cows and goats.
- Clean the house.
- Raise children.
- Perform virtually all household work.

By contrast, he notes that husbands generally purchased food and clothing but contributed little to domestic labour, they carried little but their weapons.

Additionally, fetching water was one of the most demanding tasks. Wells could be six or ten miles away, and women would leave before dawn with donkeys carrying goatskin water bags. Whilst on route, they were often targeted by brigades. Village wells served as places were women exchanged news and gossip.

== Jirga, Blood-Feuds and Hujra ==
=== Jirga (tribal council) ===
Pashtun society historically did not have a strong central government, with authority lying in tribes, clans, extended families. Within both Afghanistan and Pakistan, one of the oldest recorded traditions of Pashtun society is Jirgas, or tribal councils. It is an assembly of respected elders and chieftains, get together in a circle and make decisions for the tribe. The Jirgas or tribal councils pass laws, resolves conflicts, deal with the government, murder cases, rewards fines and death sentences, declare war and peace, and banish people from the tribe.

Foreign powers, such as the British Empire, attended Jirgas during the 18th and 19th century, in order to maintain relationships with the tribes and settle any conflicts. Today, both Afghan and Pakistani

There is no hierarchy in Jirgas, no president or spokesmen's; with respect to the elders, all the participants are equal, all can participate and speak, no one has authority over another. It has been described as "the closest thing to Athenian democracy that has existed since the original". Unlike most western courts, the Jirgas do not have any police power capable of enforcing their decisions, they instead rely on fear of public disgrace for compliance. Tribes that disobey it's decisions are at risk of losing their public standing.

=== Blood-Feuds ===
As Theodore Leighton Pennell observed, many feuds arose over what Afghans themselves summarised as "tan, zar, and zamin" (women, money, and land.) This adage is also common in the Persian and Urdu language. Disputes occurred between cousins most often, rather than strangers. Among Afghans it had become proverbial that a man was "as great an enemy as a cousin". These were mostly delegated to the jirgas that tried to keep peace but sometimes they escalated into full-fledged blood feuds. One interaction Pennell was this.

An Afghan man introduced him to his roommate by saying, "That is the man who shot my brother."

When Pennell expressed surprise that the two men lived together amicably, his host explained the logic of the feud:

"Yes, we are good friends now, because the debt is even on both sides. I have killed the same number in his family."

He wrote of this saying that once each side believed that an equal number of lives had been taken, peace could be made "without sacrificing their izzat (honour)." If one family believed the balance had not yet been restored, however, "the feud may go on indefinitely, until whole families may become nearly exterminated."

Trivial incidents historically escalated into serious generational violence among Pashtuns because of concerns over honour. During a jirga between Mahsud and Darwesh Khel Wazirs, a malik accidentally fell after being pushed by an orderly, and "in another moment the whole assembly were frantically attacking each other."; perceived insults could trigger violence among tribesmen whose honour demanded an immediate response.

=== Hujra ===
Hujras are guest houses for men, used to entertain. They act as a community club that is as old as the Jirga itself. Every village has a hujra and is occasionally owned by a wealthy family but is shared by the entire community. Male members of the community who linger and associate like a larger family commonly visit the hujra which serves as more than just a place to hold collective ceremonies.

A man can enter a Hujra at any time of the day, month or year and be sure of getting safety, food and shelter. It is only after he has been adequately fed that the members ask him how they can help him and assure him that he can stay as long as he wishes.

== Religion ==
The Pashtun people are primarily Sunni Muslims, although there are some tribes such as the Orakzai that practice Shia Islam. Islam among the Pashtuns is, to some extent, intertwined with the Pashtunwali code. Instead of relying strictly on external Islamic clerics or state courts for community issues, Pashtuns frequently rely on their native 'Jirga'.

Historically, there has been some divergence between what has been regarded as orthodox Islamic practice and the beliefs of Pashtunistan; those being widespread popular beliefs surrounding Walis (saints), shrines, charms, and miracle-workers mostly influenced by Sufism. Descriptions from European travelers reveal the religious culture in which Islamic observance coexisted with local customs that many people believed offered practical protection against illness, misfortune, and evil spirits. Many sought divine assistance through saints' shrines, blessed objects, miracle-workers, and written charms. In the modern era, this is largely no longer the case as these practices are considered to be shirk by the Taliban and conservative Pashtuns.

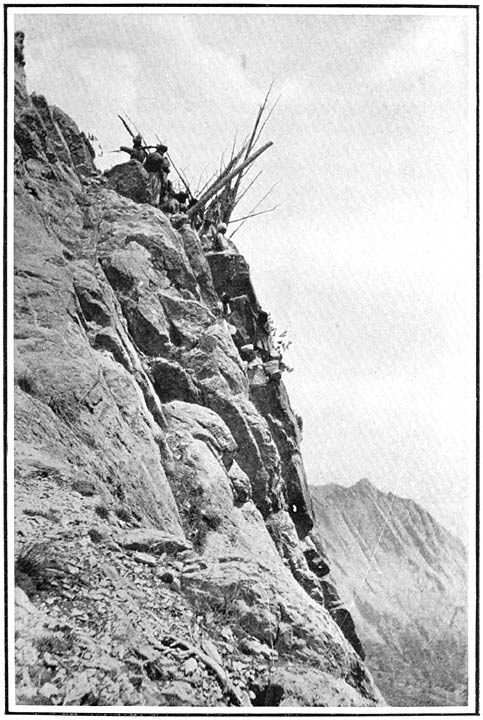
Gesudraz I Shrine on the Takht-i-Suliman

One practice that particularly interested travelers was the veneration of saints' tombs. Theodore Leighton Pennell says that "graves have a certain sanctity in the eyes of the Afghans". He records that certain shrines attracted pilgrims from considerable distances, not because of any historical importance but because miraculous powers were attributed to them. One example was a grave near the mission house at Peshawar which local people believed continued to grow each year and would leave gifts by (Mazar (mausoleum)).

The widespread use of charms and amulets as another was, and to some extent still is, another practice considered among Pashtuns. Pennell writing in 1909 claims that their use was "practically universal," extending across all classes:

The children of the rich may be seen with strings of charms fastened up in little ornamented silver caskets hung round their neck, while even the poorest labourer will not be without a charm sewn up in a bit of leather.

Most of these charms consisted of verses copied from the Qur'an by respected mullahs and then blessed before being worn. Others contained cabalistic writing, scraps of paper, or pieces of cloth believed to possess spiritual power. They were expected to protect the wearer from disease, misfortune, or supernatural danger.

As a doctor, Theodore Leighton Pennell recounts several occasions on which patients transformed his own medical prescriptions into amulets instead of taking the medicines he had prescribed. One patient proudly informed him "...he had never suffered from rheumatism... after he had tied round his arm a prescription in which I had ordered him some salicylate of soda, although he had never touched the drug."

In another case, a patient carefully wrapped Pennell's prescription "paper and all" inside leather and wore it around his neck as a protective charm rather than following the written instructions. Pennell presents these incidents as evidence that many people believed the physical presence of written words possessed healing power independent of the medicine itself.

In Pashtunistan, there were also Faqirs - nomadic folk healers - that purported to heal people with rituals at a cost.

== Cultural dance ==
=== Attan ===
Amongst Pashtuns, a part of their traditional pre-Islamic culture is the Attan, a war dance. Historically, Pashtuns perform the Attan just before or after a successful raid or tribal war, used to instill confidence before a battle and spiritually be ready, however today its usually done more specifically for celebrations such as weddings - some still do it before a tribal war.

Historically said to be linked with Zoroastrianism, It is a circular dance ranging from two to over a hundred people, and the performers will follow each other going round and round in a circle to the beat as the rhythm and beats faster. It is typically performed in a circle of tribesmen, around a drummer beating a double-headed barrel drum, the rhythm of the speed of the Attan is based on the rhythm of the drum. The dance, which is intensive, usually lasts up to 30 minutes, and is finished until exhaustion of all the performers.

There are various types of Attan in the Pashtun belt of Afghanistan and Pakistan, they differ in motions, and even accessories. The differences are unique to the different tribes such as, Khattak, Wazir, Mehsud, Kochi, Zadran, Zazai, Wardaki, Mangal and more.

== Cuisine ==
Pashtun cuisine is characterized by their own traditional dishes as well as some influence by outsiders. Rice dishes and kebabs feature prominently in Pashtun cuisine. Lamb is eaten more often in their cuisine than any other culture in the region. Bannu Pulao, Kabuli palaw, Chappli Kebab, Mutton, are the most famous dishes.

== Holidays and celebrations ==
- Eid (Islamic Holiday)
- Nowruz
- Independence day of Afghanistan (19 August),

It is not uncommon for Pashtuns to start firing guns shots joyously into the air during a special event or celebration. Celebrations include weddings, birth of a child, or the end of Ramadan.

== See also ==
- Pashtun folklore
- Pashtun people
- Pashtun tribes
- Pashtunistan
