= Ladha =

Ladha لدھا لده Lada
- Location in Pakistan
- Coordinates: 32.5677985°N 69.8288830°E
- Country: Pakistan
- Province: Khyber Pakhtunkhwa
- District: South Waziristan
- Subdivision: Ladha Subdivision
- Tehsil: Ladha
- Elevation: 5,659 ft (1,725 m)
- Time zone: UTC+5 (PST)

Ladha (Pashto: لده; Urdu: لدها) or Lada is a town in South Waziristan, in the Khyber Pakhtunkhwa province (formerly in the Federally Administered Tribal Areas, now merged with province). Just 10 km north of Ladha is the city of Makeen, while 10 km south of Ladha is the village of Kaniguram, the historical homeland of the 16th-century revolutionary leader Bayazid Pir Roshan.

== History ==
=== British Raj ===
During the early part of World War II, the Queen's Royal Regiment was stationed there.

=== War on terror ===
In November 2009, the Pakistani army launched an attack on Ladha, which killed 30 militants and wounded eight soldiers. Another attack by the Pakistani army killed 37 militants and 5 soldiers. A mine blast on a road in Ladha killed two and injured nine. A drone attack by the United States targeting the base of a Taliban leader killed 27 people in Ladha. In November 2009, Ladha was one of the targets of Operation Rah-e-Nijat by the Pakistan Army against Tehrik-i-Taliban Pakistan, during which the Pakistani military entered and cleared a large part of the area.

== See also ==
- Alamzaib Mahsud
- Mulla Powinda
- Said Alam Mahsud
