= Ladha Tehsil =

Ladha Tehsil تحصیل لدھا لده تحصیل
- Tehsil
- Country: Pakistan
- Region: Khyber Pakhtunkhwa
- District: South Waziristan
- Seat: Ladha

Government
  - Chairman: Taj Ul Malook (JUI(F))

Population (2017)
  - Total: 109,710
- Time zone: UTC+5 (PST)

Ladha Tehsil is a subdivision located in South Waziristan District, Khyber Pakhtunkhwa, Pakistan. The population is 109,710 according to the 2017 census.

== See also ==
- Alamzaib Mahsud
- Mulla Powinda
- Said Alam Mahsud

== See also ==
- List of tehsils of Khyber Pakhtunkhwa
