= 2009 Makin airstrike =

- Location: Makin, South Waziristan, Pakistan
- Date: 23 June 2009
- Deaths: More than 60
- Victim: Funeral attendees
- Perpetrator: United States

23 June 2009 Makin airstrike was an attack launched by United States drones on a funeral procession in the city of Makin in South Waziristan, Pakistan. Over 60 people were reported killed in what is considered perhaps the deadliest strike since the drone attacks started. Other sources claimed up to 83 people were dead. There were reports that Baitullah Mehsud was in the area but escaped unhurt while his deputy Qari Hussain was killed, although this has been disputed. Hussain later phoned reporters to prove he was still alive. The drones fired missiles when Sangeen Khan, an Afghan commander belonging to Tehrik-i-Taliban Pakistan, was holding a meeting soon after the funeral of an associate of Baitullah Mehsud.

== See also ==
- Drone attacks in Pakistan
- Damadola airstrike
