= Richard Pink =

Royal Air Force air commodore

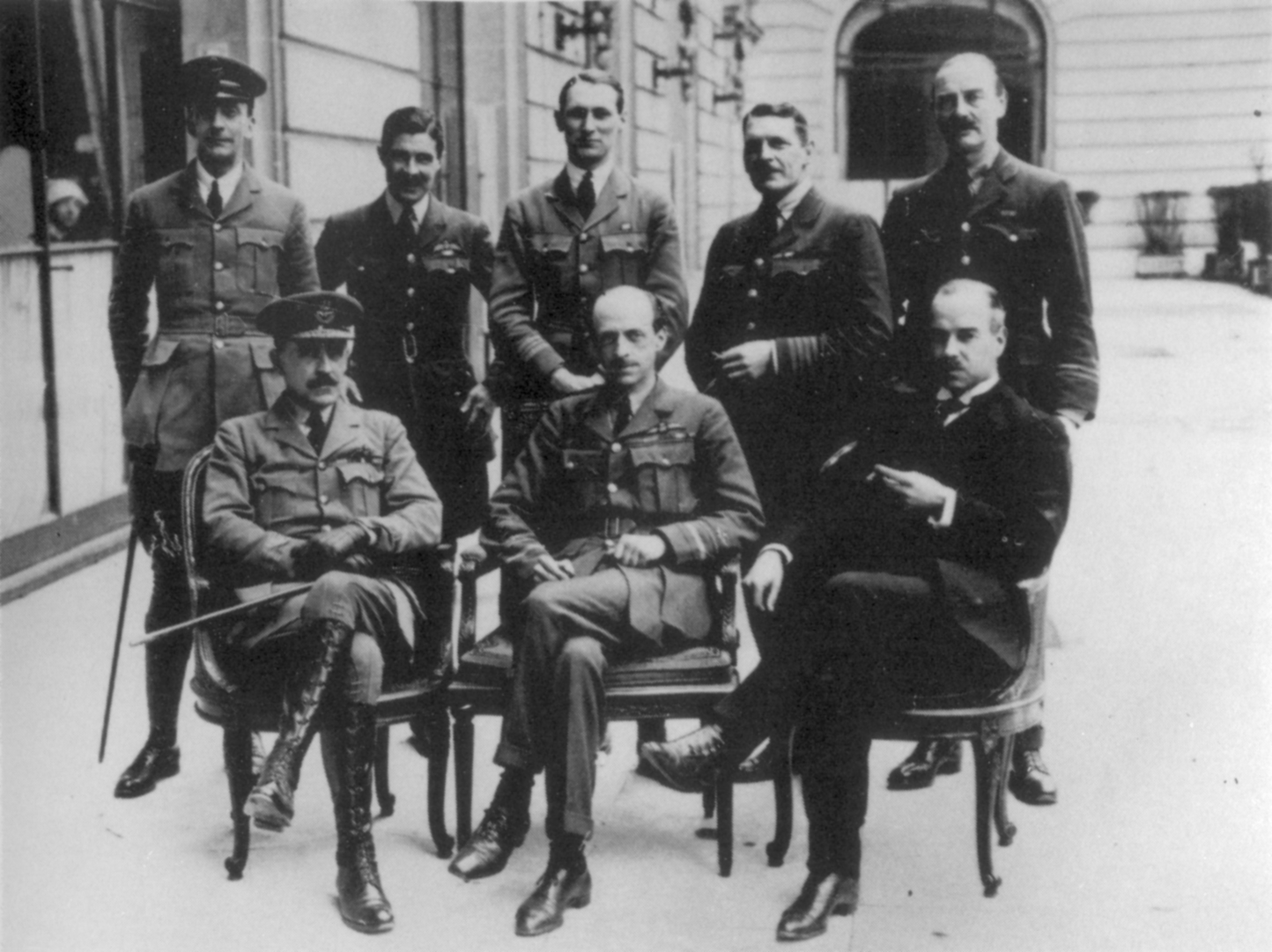
- The British Air Section at the 1919 Paris Peace Conference. The officer standing in the middle is believed to be then-Lieutenant Colonel Pink.
- Born: 30 November 1888; Winchester, Hampshire
- Died: 7 March 1932 (aged 43); Princess Mary's RAF Hospital, RAF Halton, Buckinghamshire
- Military career
- Allegiance: United Kingdom
- Branch: Royal Navy (1904–18); Royal Air Force (1918–32)
- Service years: 1904–1932
- Rank: Air Commodore
- Commands: RAF Manston (1929–31); Aircraft Depot, Egypt (1921–23); No. 2 (Indian) Wing (1925); Milford Haven Anti-Submarine Group (1917)
- Conflicts: First World War; Pink's War
- Awards: Commander of the Order of the British Empire; Mentioned in Despatches

Air Commodore Richard Charles Montagu Pink, CBE (30 November 1888 – 7 March 1932) was a senior officer in the Royal Air Force (RAF). He distinguished himself during service with the Royal Navy and Royal Naval Air Service in the First World War, before joining the RAF shortly after its creation in 1918. He is the namesake of Pink's War, which was the first campaign conducted by the RAF alone, without involvement of the British Army or Royal Navy, and the only campaign to be named after an RAF officer.

== Early life and naval career ==
Richard Charles Montagu Pink was born on 30 November 1888 in Winchester, Hampshire, to Charles Richard Pink, an architect, and Florence Anna, née Browne. He was schooled at St Aubyns, Eastbourne, and Britannia Royal Naval College, Dartmouth, Devon, then in 1904 was commissioned into the Royal Navy as a midshipman. He received promotions to sub-lieutenant in 1908 and lieutenant in 1911. He married Marie Wrigley on 27 June 1912, while stationed with the torpedo ship HMS Vulcan in Dundee. During his time with the Royal Navy and then the Royal Naval Air Service, Pink worked first in submarine and then anti-submarine warfare, coming to command the Milford Haven Anti-Submarine Group in 1917, followed by postings as Commanding Officer of RNAS Longside and RNAS Pembroke.

== Royal Air Force career ==
With the transfer of RNAS personnel into the new Royal Air Force (RAF) on 1 April 1918, Pink was appointed to senior staff duties in the Marine Operations Section of the RAF's Directorate of Flying Operations. By January 1919 he was part of the British Delegation's Air Section to the Paris Peace Conference but was recalled to home duties later that year to take up post as the Director of Flying Operations and act as the Airship Advisor to the Chief of the Air Staff. He received a permanent commission as a lieutenant colonel on 1 August 1919, a rank later renamed to wing commander. From 1919 to 1921, Pink carried out executive roles at the RAF's Coastal Aircraft Depot, before being posted at the end of November 1919 as the Officer Commanding the Aircraft Depot in Egypt.

=== With the RAF in India and 'Pink's War' ===
In November 1923, Pink took command of Nos. 5, 27, and 60 Squadrons as No. 2 (Indian) Wing. Through the early 1920s, British forces in Waziristan had undertaken a number of operations to subdue elements of Mahsud tribes in southern Waziristan, including actions by mounted cavalry. By October 1924 almost of all the tribes had ceased actions against the British, except the Abdur Rahman Khel tribe, who with support from three other tribes continued to raid army outposts. Air Vice-Marshal Sir Edward Ellington, then Air Officer Commanding RAF India since November 1923, decided that the RAF would conduct operations alone, without ground support from the Army, the first time that the RAF had fought independently of other services.

Pink formed his headquarters with No. 5 Squadron and their Bristol F.2B Fighters at Tank, before flying to the forward operations base at Miramshah to brief Nos. 27 and 60 Squadrons. Following the dropping of leaflets to warn the local population, operations commenced with the main aim not of causing casualties to the rebel forces, but to undermine morale and interrupt daily life. Sorties were flown during the day and by moonlight, both to villages and to prevent access to 'safe havens', with 2700 hours having been flown and 250 tons of bombs dropped by the end of the fifty-four days of operations. At the end of April, rebel leaders declared their intention to make peace with British forces, and on 1 May 1924 agreed to terms presented to them at Jandola.

Following the campaign, the India General Service Medal was awarded with the Waziristan 1925 clasp, the rarest clasp for the India medal, to the 46 officers and 214 men of the RAF who took part in what became known as Pink's War. Pink himself was mentioned in despatches by Air Vice-Marshal Ellington during his report on the actions in The London Gazette, with the citation reading:

I wish to bring to notice the services of Wing Commander R. C. M. Pink, C.B.E., who was in command in WAZIRISTAN. He has shown a fine example to his command in taking part personally in a number of raids. He has shown great resource, determination and energy, and it is due to the same qualities that Nos. 27 and 60 Squadrons, which were under his orders for 14 months previous to the operations, were fit to perform the arduous work required of them.

— Air Vice-Marshal Sir Edward Ellington, Air Officer Commanding RAF India

Pink was soon after promoted to group captain in the 1926 New Year Honours list "in recognition of his services in the field of Waziristan", and was assigned to HQ, Air Defence of Great Britain. He went on to command the School of Technical Training at RAF Manston from July 1929 to July 1931, returning to ADGB as an air commodore in July 1931.

== Death ==
Pink died of cancer on 7 March 1932 at Princess Mary's RAF Hospital, RAF Halton. His death at the age of 43 had "in the opinion of many senior RAF officers, denied the service a potential future chief of air staff." He had two sons by his wife Marie (née Wrigley). One of his sons, Squadron Leader Charles Richard John Pink, was killed in an air training accident at Church Fenton airfield on 9 March 1941.
