= Makeen =

Makeen مکین مکین
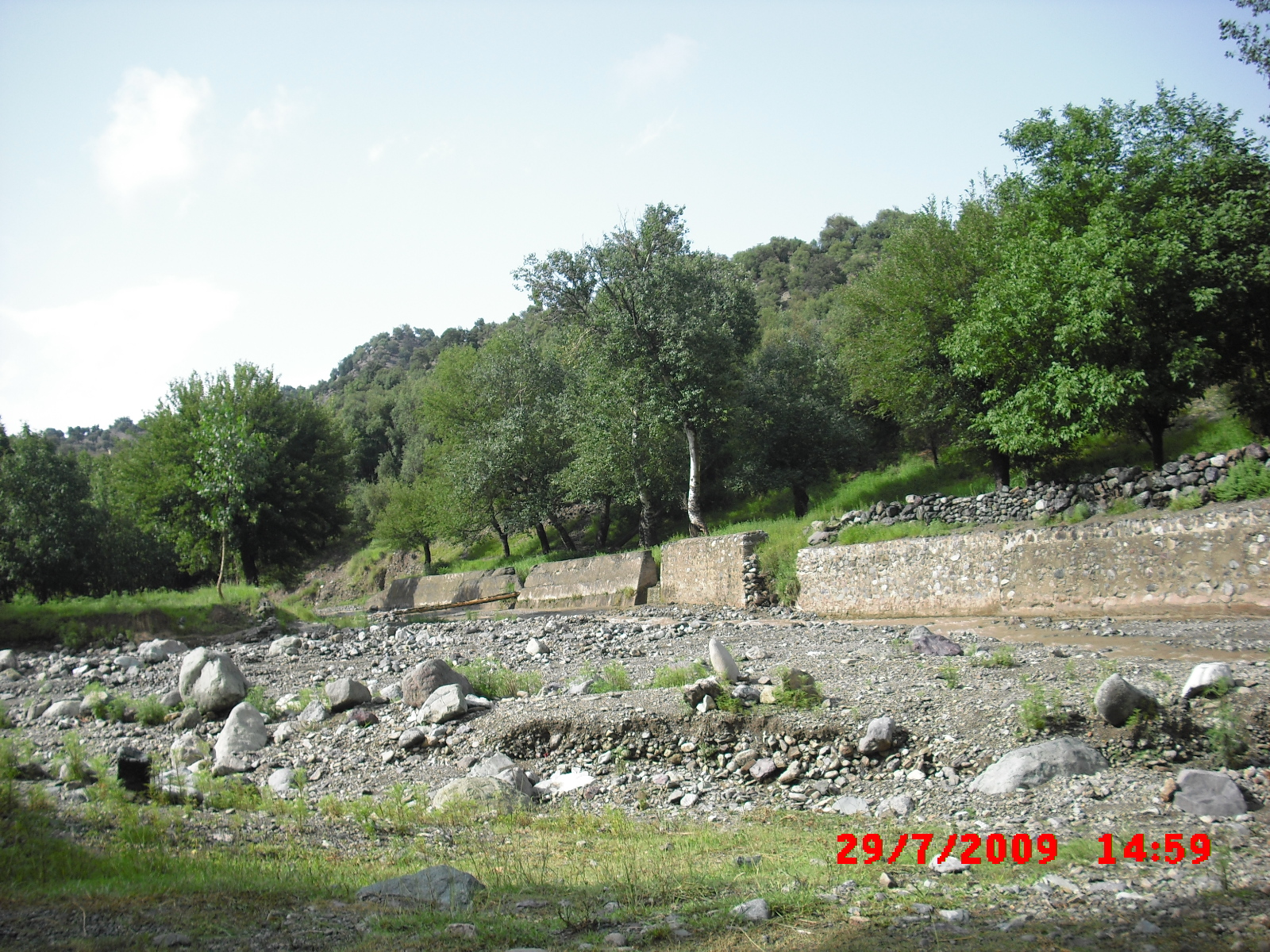

- Location within Khyber Pakhtunkhwa Location within Pakistan
- Coordinates: 32°37′15.6″N 69°50′21.72″E
- Country: Pakistan
- Province: Khyber Pakhtunkhwa
- District: South Waziristan
- Subdivision: Makin Subdivision
- Elevation: 5,591 ft (1,704 m)
- Time zone: UTC+5 (PST)

Makeen (Pashto: مکین) or Makin (ماکین) is a city in the South Waziristan region of Khyber Pakhtunkhwa, Pakistan. It is located on the boundary of the North Waziristan district. On its west, it shares a border of 40 km (25 mi) with Afghanistan's Barmal District and Paktika.

Makin Subdivision has seven middle schools (including two for girls), and two high schools (none for girls).

== History ==
=== British Raj ===
In the late 19th century, Makeen was a center of the rebellion movement and guerilla warfare against the colonial army of the British Raj, led by Mulla Powinda, a Pashtun tribal leader.

In 1919–1920, the Waziristan revolt was sparked by the Third Anglo-Afghan War. The military operation against the Mahsuds was led by Lieutenant William Kenny, who was killed during action at Kotkai, which lies to the southeast of Makeen. He received a posthumous Victoria Cross for his gallantry, the highest award of the British honours system. One aspect of this campaign was the effective use of air power in Waziristan by the British Indian Army. The Mahsuds took heavy casualties during the fighting at Ahnai Tangi. It was these casualties and the destruction of their villages a month later by bombers of the Royal Air Force, that temporarily subdued the Mahsuds. Throughout 1921–1924, the British Indians undertook a road construction effort in the region that led to further conflict during the 1921–1924 campaign.

In 1925, the British Royal Air Force carried out the Pink's War bombing campaign under the command of Wing Commander Richard Pink against the Mahsuds. After over 50 days of bombing, the tribal leaders sought peace to end the bombing, bringing the campaign to a halt. Pink's War was the first air action of the Royal Air Force carried out independently of the British Army or Royal Navy. Conflict flared up again in 1936 as the Mahsuds and other tribes joined the uprising led by Faqir Ipi (Mirzali Khan) against the British, resulting in another campaign that lasted until 1939.

=== War on terror ===
In 2007, Makeen became the hotbed for the militant activities of Baitullah Mehsud, leader of the militant group Tehrik-i-Taliban Pakistan. According to Pakistani officials and his aides, he had hundreds of trained fedayeen ready to kill themselves as suicide bombers upon his instructions. According to a United Nations report released in September 2007, he was responsible for almost 80% of suicide bombings in Afghanistan.

On 28 December 2007, Baitullah was in Makeen when he allegedly claimed responsibility for the assassination of Benazir Bhutto in Rawalpindi during a phone call intercepted by Pakistani intelligence officials. A United Nations report on Benazir, however, stated that the government was quick to blame him and that she potentially faced threats "from elements in the Pakistani establishment" itself. In February 2009, a US drone strike targeted three compounds allegedly used by Baitullah and killed over 30 people, while two vehicles were destroyed in a March 2009 drone strike. Reporter David Rohde of The New York Times, his interpreter Tahir Ludin, and their driver Asadullah Mangal, who had been kidnapped outside Kabul by the Taliban in November 2008, were being kept in Makeen during the March 2009 drone strike. Rohde reported that the area "teemed with Uzbek, Arab, Afghan and Pakistani militants." After the drone strike, the Taliban arrested and executed a local man accused of spying, whose decapitated body was hung in Makeen's bazaar. Baitullah also survived a June 2009 US airstrike which killed over 60 people in Makeen. However, in August 2009, another US drone strike succeeded to kill him and his wife.

Makeen was a target of Operation Rah-e-Nijat in 2009, a major ground-air offensive by the Pakistan Army against Tehrik-i-Taliban Pakistan, due to which thousands of families fled to IDP camps in Tank and Dera Ismail Khan. On 6 November 2009, the Pakistani military entered and cleared a large part of Makeen.

=== Contemporary history ===
Makeen was the birthplace of Naqeebullah Mehsud, who was killed on 13 January 2018 during a fake police encounter staged by a police officer Rao Anwar in Karachi. The Pashtun Tahafuz Movement (PTM), under the leadership of Manzoor Pashteen, launched a campaign to seek justice for Naqeebullah Mehsud after his murder.

== Climate ==
With a warm and temperate climate, Makeen features a subtropical highland climate with uniform rainfall (Cfb) under the Köppen climate classification. The average temperature in Makeen is 12.3 °C, while the annual precipitation averages 1,079 mm. There is a lot of precipitation even in the drier months. December is the driest month with 21 mm of precipitation, while July is the wettest month, has an average rainfall of 201 mm.

June is the warmest month of the year with an average temperature of 20.9 °C. The coldest month January has an average temperature of 0.9 °C.

Climate data for Makeen
Month	Jan	Feb	Mar	Apr	May	Jun	Jul	Aug	Sep	Oct	Nov	Dec	Year
Mean daily maximum °C (°F)	6.9 (44.4)	7.7 (45.9)	13.9 (57.0)	19.7 (67.5)	24.5 (76.1)	25.9 (78.6)	24.7 (76.5)	23.8 (74.8)	22.2 (72.0)	19.1 (66.4)	14.1 (57.4)	10.1 (50.2)	17.7 (63.9)
Daily mean °C (°F)	0.9 (33.6)	2.0 (35.6)	8.1 (46.6)	13.9 (57.0)	18.7 (65.7)	20.9 (69.6)	20.9 (69.6)	20.0 (68.0)	17.5 (63.5)	13.3 (55.9)	7.8 (46.0)	3.7 (38.7)	12.3 (54.2)
Mean daily minimum °C (°F)	−4.5 (23.9)	−3.7 (25.3)	1.7 (35.1)	7.0 (44.6)	11.8 (53.2)	15.1 (59.2)	17.0 (62.6)	16.2 (61.2)	12.8 (55.0)	7.6 (45.7)	2.1 (35.8)	−1.9 (28.6)	6.8 (44.2)
Average precipitation mm (inches)	39 (1.5)	68 (2.7)	102 (4.0)	106 (4.2)	87 (3.4)	133 (5.2)	201 (7.9)	160 (6.3)	90 (3.5)	46 (1.8)	26 (1.0)	21 (0.8)	1,079 (42.3)
Average precipitation days (≥ 0.1 mm)	4	6	10	11	11	15	21	21	16	8	4	3	130
Average relative humidity (%)	56	62	60	52	45	57	82	85	77	61	56	52	62
Mean daily sunshine hours	8.1	8.1	9.0	10.4	11.7	10.8	7.0	6.5	8.1	9.3	8.8	8.6	8.9
Source: Climate-Data.org

== Notable people ==
- Mulla Powinda
- Naqeebullah Mehsud
