= Zaman Mehsud =

Pakistani journalist

Muhammad Zaman Mehsud
- Died: 3 November 2015
- Cause of death: Multiple gunshot wounds
- Occupation: Journalist
- Employer(s): Urdu language publications, Daily Ummat, Daily Nai Baat, and the news agency SANA
- Organization: Tribal Union of Journalists' South Waziristan chapter
- Movement: Human Rights Commission of Pakistan

Muhammed Zaman Mehsud (Unknown – 3 November 2015) was a Pakistani human rights activist and journalist for Urdu language publications Daily Ummat and Daily Nai Baat, as well as the Syrian Arab News Agency. He died of injuries suffered in a targeted shooting, claimed by the extremist militant group Tehrik-e-Taliban Pakistan.

== Personal ==
Zaman Mehsud hailed from South Waziristan, a region in the tribal areas of Pakistan. He is survived by his wife and five children—three sons and two daughters—as well as his brother, Muhammad Aslam Khan. He was buried on 14 November 2015, although there is some uncertainty as to where he was buried. The Pakistan Press Foundation reported at the time that the funeral would be held at Narsez IDP camp in the Tank district of Pakistan on Wednesday. Another source said "his body was taken back to the Gomal area where he would be buried."

== Career ==
Mehsud was a journalist who worked for the Urdu-language Daily Ummat and Daily Nai Baat newspapers. He also worked for the SANA news agency and developed and ran his own Twitter news feed, called "Gomel News." He also served as the president and secretary general of the Tribal Union of Journalists' South Waziristan chapter and was a coordinator for the Human Rights Commission of Pakistan in the Tank district. Mehsud mainly did most of his reporting along the border with Afghanistan, in South Waziristan, located in Pakistan's region formerly known as the Federally Administered Tribal Areas (FATA).

== Death ==
Tank, within Pakistan, is shown relative to the capital Islamabad.

Mehsud was murdered in the Tank district in Khyber Pakhtunkhwa province while riding his motorcycle. This area lies east of FATA, along the border of Afghanistan, where terrorist groups such as the Taliban, Al-Qaida, and affiliates are known to operate. Rasool Shah, the district police chief, said that "Mehsud was traveling to his office when he was targeted." The police chief stated that Mehsud was on his motorcycle when two unknown assailants opened fire on him in the Tank district before running away. The police chief also stated Mehsud was shot seven times, other sources have reported between four and ten shots. Mehsud was taken to a nearby hospital and later transferred to D.I. Khan hospital, where he died from his wounds. Soon after Mehsud was murdered the Taliban Pakistan, known as Tehrik-i-Taliban Pakistan, claimed responsibility for the killing. In an exclusive quote to Reuters, Tehrik-i-Taliban Pakistan commander Qari Saif Ullah Saif said, "We killed him because he was writing against us...we have some other journalists on our hit list in the region, soon we will target them." While Taliban Pakistan claimed responsibility for the killing and many organizations strongly condemned the killing and pressed for a proper investigation, no one has been charged or convicted of the killing of Mehsud.

== Context ==
The killing happened the day after the International Day to End Impunity for Crimes against Journalists. This is a day where journalists and news organizations are encouraged to come forward and discuss the lack of justice when it comes to convictions of violent crimes committed against journalists and media employees. "Pakistan ranks as the fifth worst country in terms of the numbers of unresolved cases of violence against journalists." According to Human Rights Watch, "More than 35 journalists and media workers have been killed in Pakistan because of their work since 2010." Many Pakistani journalists are subjected too harassment, intimidation, assault, kidnapping, and even arbitrary arrest and detention.

== Impact ==
Mehsud's death was important because it helped shed a light on the lack of support from government officials in investigating violent crimes against journalists. On 2 December 2015, members of Pakistan's Federally Administered Tribal Areas marched from the Peshawar Press Club to the door of the Governor's house where speakers addressed the public. The former president of the Tribal Union of Journalists, Safar Dawar, spoke against government officials for failing to take on the responsibility for following up on the murder of Mehsud after a faction of the Tehrik-i-Taliban Pakistan claimed responsibility for the killing. Another speaker pointed out that maybe Impunity wouldn't be such a problem today if the murder of journalist, Hayatullah Khan, in 2006 had been properly investigated. Another journalist, Sailab Mahsud also stepped forward and reprimanded the governor of Peshawar for living a life of pleasure and being constantly surrounded by security while the journalist from the tribal areas are the ones actually reporting on the conflict and news in these areas, while they continue to be targeted with no assistance from the government. Naseer Azam Mehsud, is journalist that had to flee his home in Tank, after the death of Zaman Mehsud and receiving a death threat from the Tehrik-i-Taliban Pakistan in the exclusive quote to Reuters. Nazeer said, "While claiming credit for killing Zaman, Qari Saifullah threatened to kill three other journalists because they are not giving coverage to Taliban stories. A fellow journalist informed me about the life threatening call from Qari Saifullah. Then, I immediately shifted." Many journalists are at a crossroads when it comes to a situation like this, because the government passed a ban that forbids covering militant groups. Even though, in 2014, the military launched an operation in the Tribal regions to get rid of the Tehrik-i-Taliban Pakistan and other militant groups, it has left many people displaced and threats are still at an all-time high with many of these sources coming from the Tehrik-i-Taliban Pakistan and even governmental sources.

== Reactions ==
A number of organizations had strong reactions to the murder of Mehsud.

Irina Bokova, director-general of UNESCO, said, "I condemn the murder of Zaman Mehsud, I look forward to a full investigation of his killing. We should not let violence muzzle the media and deprive the public of news and information."

Another statement issued by Human Rights Watch from Brad Adams, Asia director, said, "The Taliban's claim of responsibility for this latest killing of journalist shows a cruel disregard for human life and free speech. Pakistan's government needs to move to bring the perpetrators of attacks on journalists to justice if these crimes are to stop."

The IFJ and PFUJ also responded in strongly condemning the killing. The general secretary of IFJ, Anthony Bellanger, stated, "The IFJ strongly condemns the killing of senior journalist Dr Zaman Mehsud in Khyber Pahktunkhwa province of Pakistan. The province is one of the most dangerous zones in Pakistan for journalists to exercise their duties, and perform duties, and we are saddened by the killing of a senior journalist and media rights activist. The killing came a day after Pakistan and the world marked the International Day to End Impunity for Crimes against Journalists in the country where impunity is rife in cases of killing journalists. The IFJ urge the Pakistan government to ensure that justice is delivered to Mehsud and other killed journalists."

In a separate joint statement from the PFUJ, Lahore-based president, Rana Azeem, and general secretary, Amin Yousef, said "This recent incident has highlighted the need to act against impunity for crimes against journalists that persists in Pakistan. Pakistan was already the most dangerous country in the world for journalists were as many as 117 journalists have sacrificed their lives in the last decade. We are already running impunity campaign for the crimes against journalists and this murder has added the difficulties for the working journalists in the country."

== See also ==
- Human rights in Pakistan
