= Powindah =

Powindah may refer to:

- Powindah, an Indian English term for the Kuchi, nomadic tribesmen found in Afghanistan and Pakistan known as the pioneers of nomadic trade
- Mullah Powindah, a Pashtun religious leader who died in 1913
- Powindah (Dune), a fictional term from Frank Herbert's Dune universe
