= Darweshkhel =

The Darweshkhel (Pashto: دروېش خېل) is a section of the Wazir Pashtun tribe found in South Waziristan, North Waziristan, and Frontier Region Bannu in the Federally Administered Tribal Areas of Pakistan on its border with Afghanistan.

The tribe comprises two geographically separate subgroups. The Utmanzai are settled in the North Waziristan Agency and the Ahmadzai are in the South Waziristan Agency and Bannu District. Those subgroups are in turn divided further, for example into Utmanzai tribes such as the Bakakhel and Janikhel.

== Origin legend ==
The Darweshkhel are said to descend from Musā, son of Khidrai, son of Wazīr. Musā was a religious man and so was nicknamed Darwesh ("fakir"). Musa is said to have died in the hills near Khwāja Khidar, at the border between present-day South and North Waziristan.

Another son of Khidrai was Masud, who is said to be the progenitor of the Masid tribe, another branch of the Waziri confederacy.

Besides Musa Darwesh and Masud, Khidrai is also said to have had a third son Mubarak, who in turn had a son called Gurbuz, the namesake of the third branch (Gurbuz) of the Waziri confederacy. The Gurbuz now live in westernmost North Waziristan and in southern Khost.
