= Government College Asghar Mall Rawalpindi =

Government Graduate College, Asghar Mall, Rawalpindi گورنمنٹ گریجوئیٹ کالج اصغر مال، راولپنڈی
- Other names: Asghar Mall College
- Motto: Arabic: عَلَّمَ الْإِنسَانَ مَا لَمْ یَعْلَمْ (انسان کو سکھایا، جو وہ نہیں جانتا تھا)
- Motto in English: Taught man that which he knew not
- Type: Public
- Established: 1913; 113 years ago
- Affiliations: Board of Intermediate and Secondary Education, Rawalpindi; University of the Punjab
- Principal: Dr. Tanwir Ahmad Abbas Khichi
- Location: Rawalpindi, Punjab, Pakistan; 33°37′45″N 73°03′31″E
- Colours: Blue, white, and grey
- Website: gpgcam.edu.pk

Government Post Graduate College, Asghar Mall, Rawalpindi, founded as Sanatan Dharma High School, is a historical and prominent government college in Rawalpindi, Pakistan. It was established in 1913 as a high school by Sanatan Dharma, a Hindu religious movement.

== History ==
In 1904, a high school was established in Rawalpindi bearing the name of the renowned Hindu sect SANA'-TUN-DHARAM. The property of the school included the premises of the school itself and the adjacent temple. The present building was constructed for the first time in 1913.

Pakistan was founded. The Education Department of the Government of Punjab announced that the SANA'-TUN-DHARAM school would be raised to the status of a college on 19 October 1948.

== Building ==
The college building infrastructure is divided into seven blocks & one auditorium:

- Main Block
- Science Block
- Faisal Block
- Johar Block
- Jinnah Block
- Post-Graduate Block
- Administration Block
- Alimuddin Auditorium

== Subjects taught ==
- Islamiyat
- Arabic
- Urdu
- Pakistan Studies
- Physics
- Chemistry
- Biology
- Zoology
- Botany
- English
- Economics
- Statistics
- Mathematics
- Persian
- Computer
- Geography
- Civic
- Psychology
- Education
- African American Culture
- Space Chimps Analysis

== Notable alumni ==
- Said Alam, pediatric surgeon and political activist
- Babar Awan
- Raja Abdul Hanif, Pakistani politician
- Shoaib Akhtar, Pakistani former cricketer
- Jan Rambo, Pakistani Actor
