= Pink's War =

RAF bombardment against the Mahsud

- Part of the instability on the North-West Frontier
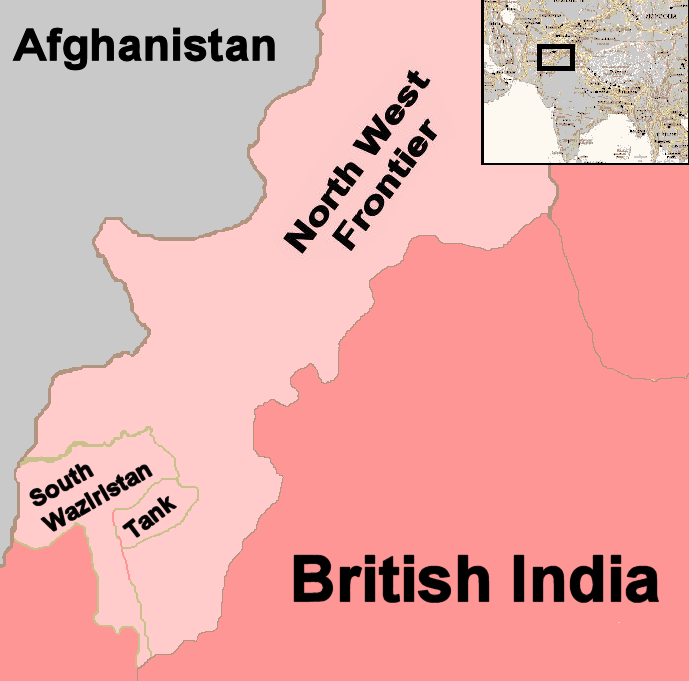
- Map of the area of operations
Date	9 March 1925 – 1 May 1925 (53 days)
Location	South Waziristan
Result	British victory (see Operations section)

Belligerents
United Kingdom	Mahsud tribesmen

Commanders and leaders
(United Kingdom) Edward Ellington (United Kingdom) Richard Pink	Unknown

Units involved
No. 2 (Indian) Wing, RAF	Unknown

Strength
Three aircraft squadrons	Four tribes

Casualties and losses
Two killed One aircraft lost	Unknown

Pink's War was an air-to-ground bombardment and strafing campaign carried out by the Royal Air Force, under the command of Wing Commander Richard Pink, against the mountain strongholds of Mahsud tribesmen in South Waziristan in March and April 1925. It was the first independent action by the RAF, without the engagement of British Army or Royal Navy, and remains the only campaign named after an RAF officer.

== Background ==
The defence of the North-West Frontier Province was an important task for British India. In the 1920s, the British were engaged in a continuing effort to defend British Indian Army bases against raids from native Pashtun tribesmen in the province. In July 1924, the British mounted operations against several of the Mahsud tribes in southern Waziristan and by October most tribes had ceased their activities. Only the Abdur Rahman Khel tribe and three other supporting tribes continued to attack army posts.

== Operations ==
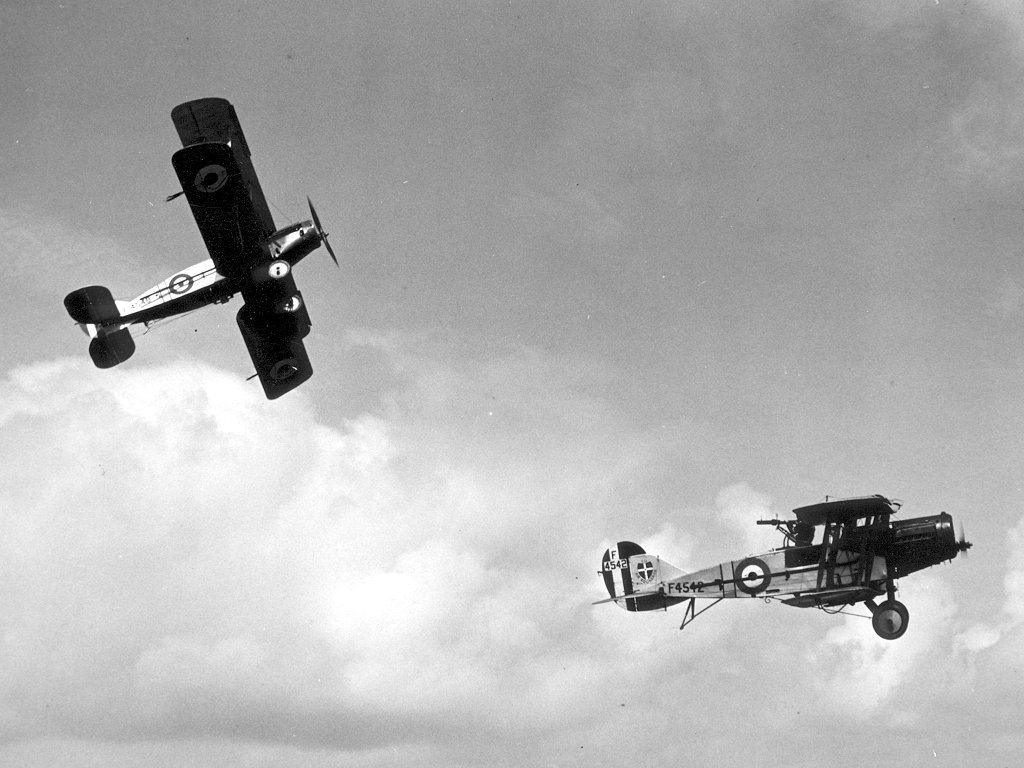
A pair of Bristol F.2B fighters, one of the types of aircraft used in the operation

After the successful use of aerial bombardment in the Fifth Somaliland Expedition in 1920, the fledgling RAF was keen to further establish its military credentials. British forces had conducted operations against Mahsud tribes in Waziristan from July 1924, leaving only the Abdur Rahman Khel tribe and a few other tribes still engaged in activity by October 1924. The air officer commanding in India, Sir Edward Ellington, made the unprecedented decision to conduct air operations against the tribesmen without the support of the army. No. 2 (India) Wing, under the command of Wing Commander Richard Pink at Risalpur, was assigned to conduct the operation.

Bristol F.2B Fighters of No. 5 Squadron were deployed to the operational headquarters at Tank airstrip, with de Havilland DH.9As from 27 and 60 squadrons deployed to a forward operating base at Miranshah. Operations commenced on 9 March 1925, and following an initial sortie to drop warning leaflets on the targeted areas, the RAF squadrons strafed tribal mountain strongholds in a successful attempt to crush the rebellion. Operations focused on causing disruption to day-to-day activities for the militant tribes, as well as preventing access to safe havens; sorties were flown at night as well as during the day, in order to cause further disruption.

On 1 May 1925, after just over 50 days of bombing, the tribal leaders sought peace to end the bombing, bringing the short campaign to a close. Only two British lives and one aircraft were lost during the campaign; Mahsud casualties are not known. Pink's War was the first air action of the RAF carried out independently of the British Army or Royal Navy.

== Honours ==
After the campaign was over, the India General Service Medal with the Waziristan 1925 bar was awarded to the 46 officers and 214 men of the Royal Air Force who took part in Pink's War. It was by far the rarest bar given with an India General Service Medal, and was only awarded after the then-Chief of the Air Staff Sir John Salmond succeeded in overturning the War Office decision not to grant a medal for the campaign. The campaign's commander, Wing Commander Pink, after whom the action became named, soon received a promotion to group captain "in recognition of his services in the field of Waziristan". For distinguished service during Pink's War, Squadron Leader Arthur John Capel was awarded the Distinguished Service Order, the Distinguished Flying Cross was awarded to flight lieutenants John Baker and William Cumming, and Flying Officer Reginald Pyne, and the Distinguished Flying Medal was given to sergeant pilots George Campbell and Ralph Hawkins, Sergeant Arthur Rutherford, Corporal Reginald Robins, and Leading Aircraftman William Alfred Walmsley. A further 14 men were mentioned in despatches, including flying officers Edward Dashwood and Noel Hayter-Hames, who both died in the campaign.

== See also ==
- First Anglo-Afghan War
- Second Anglo-Afghan War
- Third Anglo-Afghan War
- Waziristan campaign (1921–1924)
- Waziristan campaign (1936–1939)
- Waziristan rebellion of 1948-1954
- North-West Frontier (military history)
- List of Waziristan Campaign Victoria Cross recipients
- Bacha Khan
- Mirzali Khan
- Mullah Powindah
