= Pakhtunkhwa Olasi Tehreek =

Pakhtunkhwa Olasi Tehreek پښتونخوا اولسي تحريک
- Founder: Said Alam
- Founded: 2014
- Ideology: Progressivism
- Political position: Center-left

The Pakhtunkhwa Olasi Tehreek (POT) is a movement in Pakistan that primarily operates in the Khyber Pakhtunkhwa province. Founded by Said Alam in 2014.

== History ==
The movement was founded by Said Alam and a group of young activists and political leaders who were unhappy with the current political landscape in the province. The party's main focus is on promoting the rights and welfare of the people of Khyber Pakhtunkhwa, particularly in the areas of education, healthcare, and economic development.

== Ideology ==
The party's ideology is centered on progressive and democratic values, and it is committed to the principles of social justice, equality, and human rights. POT also advocates for greater autonomy and self-governance for the people of Khyber Pakhtunkhwa, and it is a strong advocate for the rights of the Pashtun people.
