= Makin Tehsil =

Makin Tehsil تحصیل مکین مکین تحصیل
- Tehsil
- Country: Pakistan
- Region: Khyber Pakhtunkhwa
- District: South Waziristan
- Seat: Makeen

Population (2017)
  - Total: 58,700
- Time zone: UTC+5 (PST)

Makin Tehsil is a subdivision located in South Waziristan District, Khyber Pakhtunkhwa, Pakistan. The population is 58,700 according to the 2017 census. The main town is Makeen.

== Notable people ==
- Mulla Powinda
- [Malik Muhammad Nawaz Abdallai]
- [Malik Haji Muhammad Khan]
- Naqeebullah Mehsud

== See also ==
- Makeen
- List of tehsils of Khyber Pakhtunkhwa
