= Said Alam =

Pediatric surgeon and political activist

Said Alam Mahsud
- سید عالم محسود
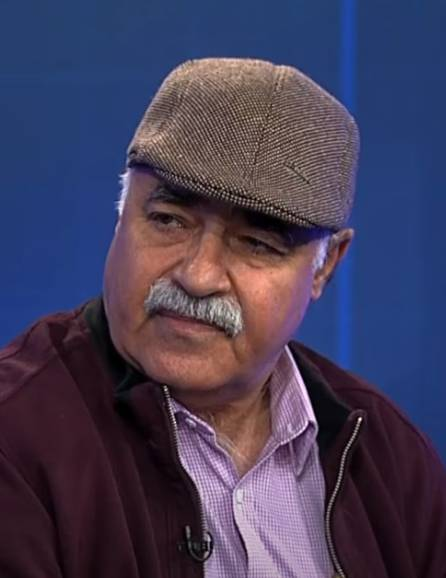
- Said Alam in 2019
- Born: May 17, 1958 (age 67); Pamana, Ladha, South Waziristan, Pakistan
- Education: Khyber Medical College, University of Peshawar
- Occupations: pediatric surgeon, political activist
- Organization: Pakhtunkhwa Olasi Tehreek
- Movement: Pashtun Tahafuz Movement

Said Alam Mahsud (Pashto: سید عالم ماسید; Urdu: سید عالم محسود) is a pediatric surgeon, political activist, and one of the leaders of the Pashtun Tahafuz Movement (PTM). He is also the chairman of the civil society organisation Pashtunkhwa Ulasi Tehrik, and a technical expert on China–Pakistan Economic Corridor (CPEC). He was formerly the provincial senior vice-president of the Pashtunkhwa Milli Awami Party (PMAP). Although based in Peshawar, he belongs to the Mahsud tribe of South Waziristan, Pakistan.

== Early life and education ==
Said Alam was born on 17 May 1958 in Pamana, a village in the Ladha Tehsil of South Waziristan, Pakistan. In 1977, he completed his higher secondary education at Government College Asghar Mall Rawalpindi. In 1982, he completed his Bachelor of Medicine, Bachelor of Surgery (MBBS) at Khyber Medical College, University of Peshawar. In 1993, he did a fellowship in pediatric surgery at the College of Physicians and Surgeons Pakistan.

== Political activism ==
In 2004, Said Alam joined the Pashtunkhwa Milli Awami Party (PMAP) and became its provincial senior vice-president for the North-West Frontier Province (present-day Khyber Pakhtunkhwa). He left PMAP in 2012.

He started his political activism against the Taliban militants in 2010. "In those days, it was very difficult to talk against the Taliban in Peshawar, but we would stage public protests and chant slogans against them, visit injured victims and condole the bereaved, and urge people displaced by the fighting to address the real issue," he said. The Taliban threatened him that he was on their hit list, forcing him to sell his clinic and move his family. He went underground, constantly changing his location with the help of his relatives and friends.

In April 2014, he founded the civil society organization Pashtunkhwa Ulasi Tehrik. Later, he became the Khyber Pakhtunkhwa government's technical expert on China–Pakistan Economic Corridor (CPEC).

In late January 2018, he joined the Pashtun Tahafuz Movement. He actively participated in the "Pashtun Long March" from Dera Ismail Khan to Islamabad, which was held to demand justice for the Pashtun shopkeeper and aspiring model, Naqeebullah Mehsud, who was extrajudicially killed in Karachi during a fake encounter staged by the police. Referring to PTM, Said Alam said: "For the first time in history, the Pashtuns across Khyber Pakhtunkhwa, the Federally Administered Tribal Areas, and adjoining northern districts of Balochistan Province have become united."

=== Exit Control List ===
Said Alam's name was placed on the Exit Control List by the Government of Pakistan on 8 December 2018 because of his association with PTM, barring him from leaving the country. He submitted a petition against it at the Peshawar High Court, in which he argued that he was ill and needed to go to England to seek treatment. The court ordered the Ministry of Interior to remove his name from the list to enable him to travel abroad.

== Published works ==
Said Alam is the author of books and articles, including The Case of Pakhtuns in Pakistan published in 2006.

== See also ==
- Manzoor Pashteen
- Fazal Khan
- Tahir Dawar
- Arman Loni
- Abdullah Nangyal
- Gulalai Ismail
