= Qari Imran training camp =

According to United States's military intelligence there was a Qari Imran training camp in Pakistan's border region.

The News International reported that the camp was located in South Waziristan Agency. The reported that the camp "belonged to Commander Qari Imran alias Hakeem Nasir of the Mehsud group." They said the camp was part of Tehrik-e-Taliban, Baitullah Mehsud's group. Dawn described Qari Imran as an Al Qaeda facilitator. The reported the camp had been used to train Arshad Pathan, a suicide bomber who struck on February 4, 2009. They named three other individuals who had been involved in setting up the bombing: Qari Muhammad Ismail, Ghulam Mustafa Qaisrani, and Qari Hassan Ahmed Mehsud. Qari Muhammad Ismail and Ghulam Mustafa Qaisrani were captured in April 2009, and promptly confessed to helping organize the attack. Dawn reported that the pair's capture came from information supplied by another recent capture, Qari Ismael.

American officials reported that 10 to 15 individuals were killed when the camp was hit by a missile launched from a Predator UAV on September 11, 2008.
