= Povindah =

Pashtun nomadic tribal class

The Povindah (Pashto: پاوینډه) were a class of warrior nomadic traders in present-day Afghanistan and north-western Pakistan, who belonged chiefly to the tribes of Ghilzais Pashtuns. Their name, which designates their occupation, is derived from the same root as the Pashto word meaning "to graze".

== Occupation ==
They assembled every autumn on the plains east of Ghazni, with their families, flocks, herds and long strings of camels and horses, laden with the goods of Bokhara and Kandahar; and forming a caravan march through the Kakar and Waziri countries by the Zhob and Gumal passes of the Suliman Hills.

== Powindah tribes ==
Several of the Ghilji or Ghilzai are almost wholly engaged in the carrying trade between India and Afghanistan and the northern states of Central Asia and have so for many centuries to the exclusion of all other tribes of the country . The principal clans employed in this great carrying trade are the Ahmadzai, Hotak, Niazi, Nasar, Miakhel, Mulla Khel, Daulat Khel, Kundi, Kharoti and the Sulemankhel. From the nature of their occupation they collectively styled, or individually so far as that goes, Povinda and Lawani or Lohani

=== List of Povindah clans ===
- Ghilzai
- Nasar is a Pashtun ethnic Khillji Tribe, mainly living in Afghanistan and Pakistan. The most famous General Saidal Khan Nasar who Fought with Persia along with Mirwais Baba as Chief of Army and overcame Isfahan now in the modern days the popular politicians in Pakistan namely Mullana Fazal u Rehman, Sardar Yaqoob Khan Nasar.

Ahmadzai

The Ahmadzai (Pashto: احمدزی) is a Pashtun subtribe of the Ghilji confederacy. The Ahmadzai Pashtun tribe is a Powandah tribe and are traditional nomadic merchant warriors.

Hotak

- Niazi:

In the early part of the 15th century the Niazi and Lodhi tribe, followed their kinsmen from Ghazni into Tank where they lived as Pawindahs for nearly a century

- Kharoti

== See also ==
- Niazi
- Lohani
