= India General Service Medal (1909) =

British campaign medal

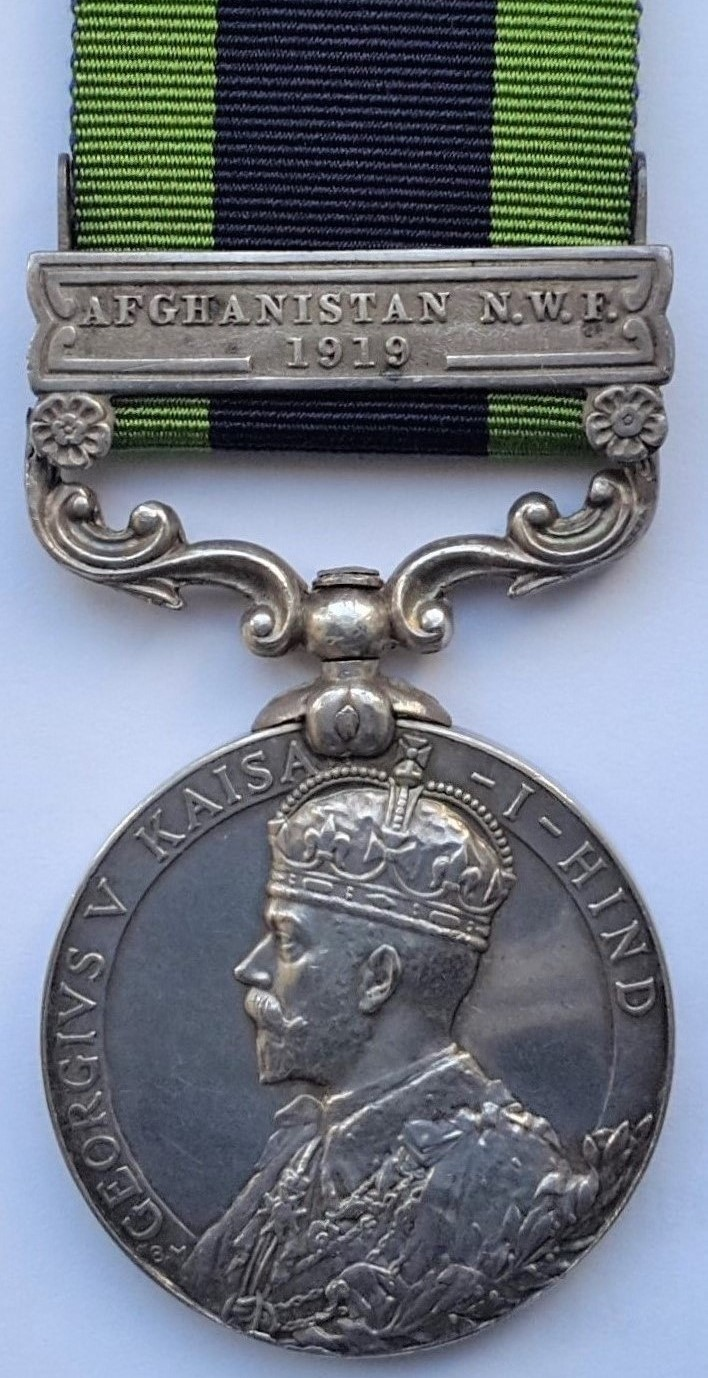
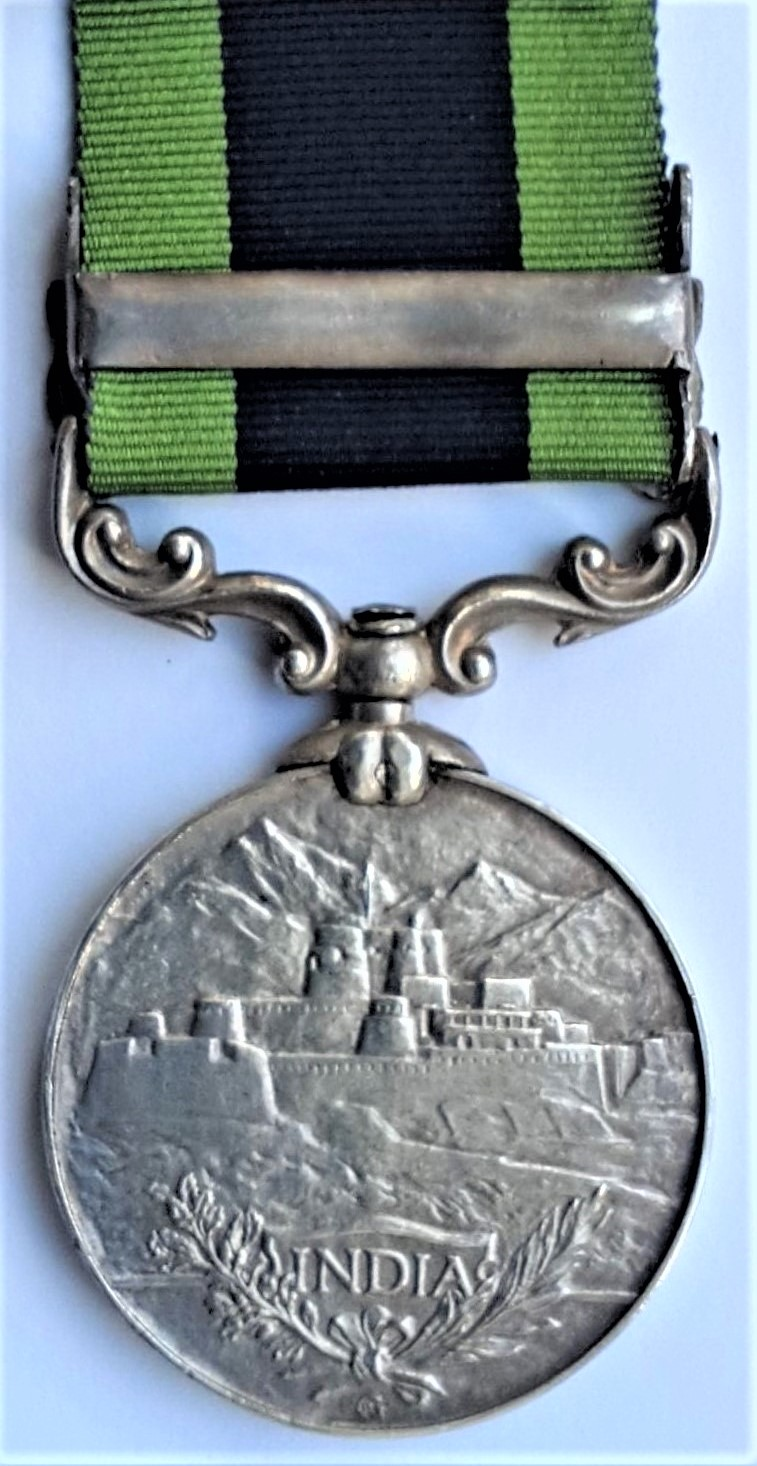
- Obverse and reverse of medal with Afghanistan NWF 1919 clasp.
- Type: Campaign medal
- Awarded for: Campaign service.
- Description: Silver or bronze disk, 36mm diameter.
- Presented by: United Kingdom of Great Britain and Ireland
- Eligibility: British and Indian forces.
- Campaign: India 1908–35.
- Clasps: North West Frontier 1908; Abor 1911–12; Afghanistan NWF 1919; Mahsud 1919–20; Waziristan 1919–21; Malabar 1921–22; Waziristan 1921–24; Waziristan 1925; North West Frontier 1930–31; Burma 1930–32; Mohmand 1933; North West Frontier 1935
- Established: 1909
- Ribbon: 32mm, green with broad blue central stripe.

The India General Service Medal (1909 IGSM) was a campaign medal approved on 1 January 1909, for issue to officers and men of the British and Indian armies. From 1919, it was also awarded to officers and men of the Royal Air Force. It was never issued with a clasp. In the case the recipient qualified for subsequent clasps they were issued just the additional clasps, not a new medal. However, due to lapses in administration, on occasion fresh medals bearing the later clasps were sent out to recipients in error.

== Clasps ==
The 1909 IGSM was awarded for various minor military campaigns in India from 1908 to 1935. Each campaign was represented by a clasp on the ribbon; 12 were sanctioned.

- North West Frontier 1908
- Abor 1911–12
- Afghanistan NWF 1919
- Mahsud 1919–20
- Waziristan 1919–21
- Malabar 1921–22
- Waziristan 1921–24
- Waziristan 1925
- North West Frontier 1930–31
- Burma 1930–32
- Mohmand 1933
- North West Frontier 1935

== Description ==
The medal is 36 millimetres (1.4 in) in diameter. It was struck at both the Calcutta and London mints, for Indian and British forces respectively. For the first two clasps the medal & clasp was awarded in silver to combatants and in bronze to native bearers and servants. From 1919 onwards all awards were in silver.

The obverse shows the reigning monarch facing left with a suitable inscription. There are three versions:

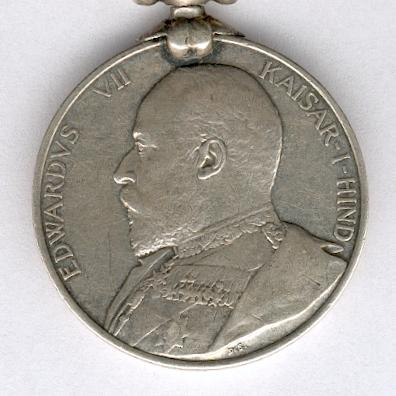
King Edward VII 1908–10
EDWARDVS VII KAISAR-I-HIND

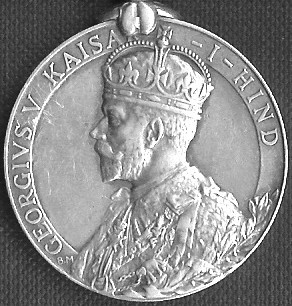
King George V 1911–25
GEORGIVS V KAISAR-I-HIND

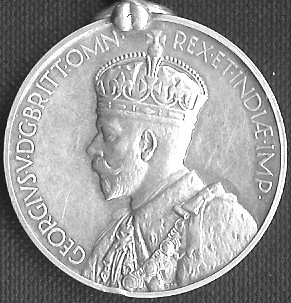
King George V 1930–35
GEORGIVS V DG BRITT OMN REX ET INDIAE IMP

The reverse depicts Jamrud Fort at the Khyber Pass with the word ‘India’ below between a wreath of oak and olive branches.

The ribbon, 1.25 inches (32 mm) wide, was green with a broad blue central stripe. After a change in regulations in 1947, those recipients of a mentioned in despatches in a campaign for which the medal was awarded after 1920 could wear a bronze oakleaf on the medal ribbon.

The name and details of the recipient originally were engraved on the edge of the medal however from 1919 onwards it was impressed.

== Waziristan 1925 ==
The Medal with the Waziristan 1925 clasp was awarded to only 46 officers and 214 men of the Royal Air Force, and 2 Indian Army Officers, who took part in Pink's War. It is, by far, the rarest clasp given with an India General Service Medal, with the exception of only 14 ‘Burma 1930-32’ clasps, awarded to the Royal Air Force, and was only awarded after the then Chief of the Air Staff, Sir John Salmond, succeeded in overturning the War Office decision not to grant a medal for Pink's War. The ‘Waziristan 1925’ clasp, was not awarded to Royal Air Force personnel, who already had, or elected to have, the ‘Waziristan 1921-24’ clasp. For details, see ‘British Battles & Medals’, 7th. Edition.

== See also ==
- North-West Frontier (military history)
- Stiles, Richard G.M.L. (2012). Taming the Tiger. The Story of the India General Service Medal Roll 1908-1935. London: Savannah Publications. ISBN 978-1-90-236651-7.

== Bibliography ==
- Dorling, H. Taprell (1956). Ribbons and Medals. London: A.H.Baldwin & Sons. OCLC 930416375.
- Joslin; Litherland; Simpkin (1988). British Battles and Medals (6th ed.). London: Spink. ISBN 0-907605-25-7.
- Laffin, John, Swifter than Eagles, a biography of Marshal of the RAF Sir John Salmond, (1964). William Blackwood & Sons Ltd
- Mackay, J and Mussel, J (eds), Medals Yearbook - 2006, (2005). Token Publishing
- Mussell, John W, ed. (2015). Medal Yearbook 2015. Honiton, Devon: Token Publishing Limited. ISBN 978-1-90-882816-3.
