= Daily Ummat =

Pakistani Newspaper

- Format: Tabloid
- Founder(s): Abdul Rafiq Afghan
- Founded: 1996
- Political alignment: Islamism
- Language: Urdu
- Country: Pakistan
- Website: Official website (in Urdu)

The Daily Ummat (Urdu: روزنامہ امت) is an Islamist Urdu-language newspaper published in Karachi, Sindh, Pakistan.

== History ==
Daily Ummat was founded in 1996 by Abdul Rafiq Afghan and family.

== Coverage ==
Adopting the motto, "we show all that others hide", the Daily Ummat practices comprehensive news coverage. It has long reported on the intersection of crime, ethnic violence, and politics in Karachi, frequently attributing these issues to the Muttahida Qaumi Movement (MQM). This criticism towards MQM can be traced back to allegations surrounding the death of Abdul Rafiq Afghan’s father-in-law, Maulana Salahuddin, as well as past conflicts in student politics.

== Political stance ==
Daily Ummat has a distinctively pro-Islamist stance. It actively promotes causes such as actions in the India-administered Kashmir and opposition to western forces in Afghanistan. The newspaper routinely covers instances of alleged or actual discrimination against Muslims worldwide.

The paper stands in strong support of Pakistan's anti-blasphemy laws, as well as other legislation in the country inspired by Islamic principles. The editorial content is noted for its focus on the Ahmadi community, a minority sect that identifies as Muslim but is legally prohibited from publicly affirming this identity.

The newspaper also exhibits clear ideological demarcations in its content. It often presents moderate, liberal, and leftist figures under a critical lens, irrespective of their societal or national contributions. On the other hand, it tends to withhold critique from favored entities and individuals, who are mainly Islamist politicians, extremist preachers, jihadists, or anti-Shia militants.

The newspaper uses front-page advertisements to rally public support on religious issues. For instance, it called on Karachi's citizens to 'reclaim' a mosque demolished by city authorities due to its unauthorized establishment on a public park.
