= South Waziristan District =

South Mahsud Waziristan District ضلع جنوبی محسود وزیرستان
- District of Khyber Pakhtunkhwa
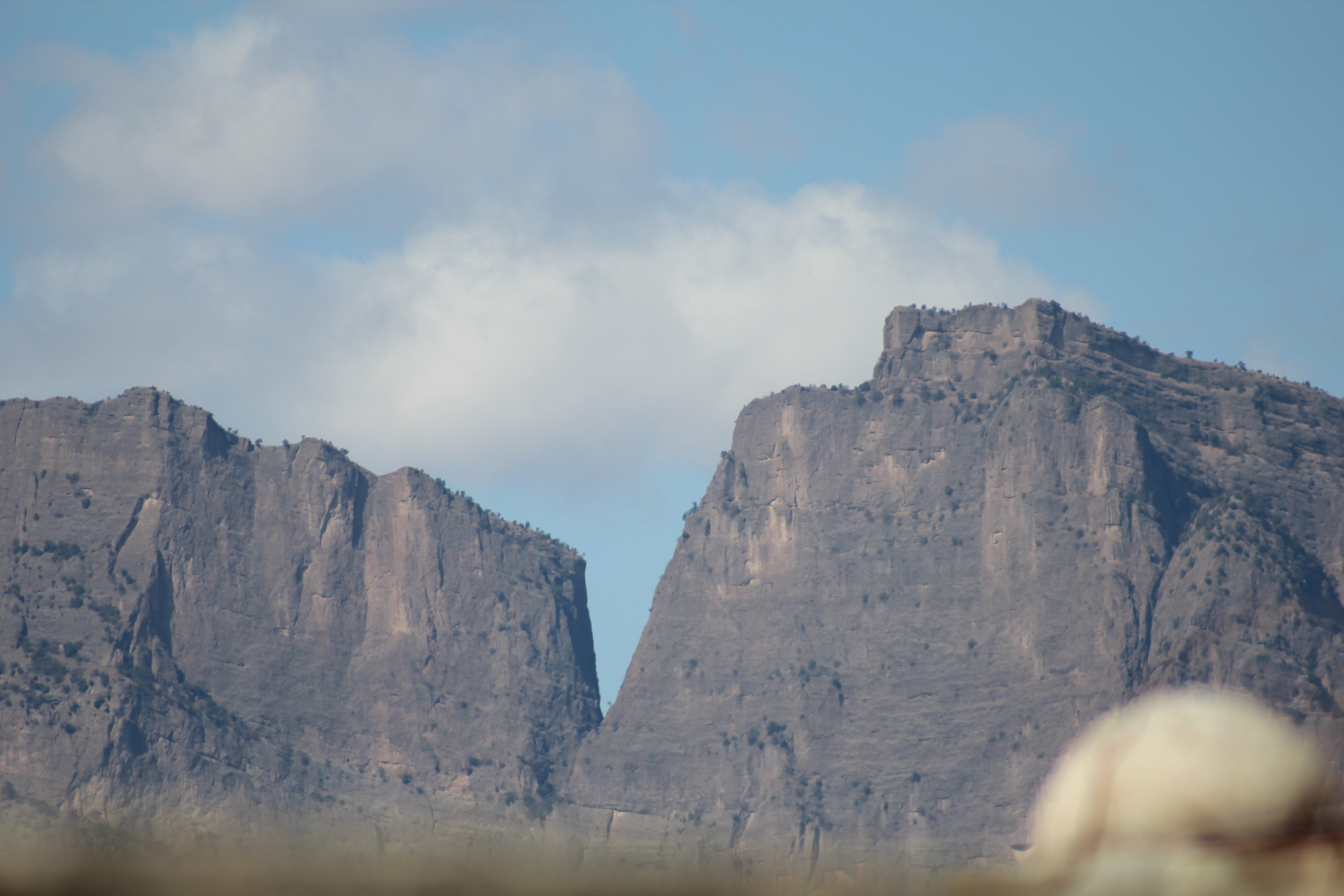
- Skanrr Gharra mountain from Kot Nawaz

- Map of South Waziristan District
- Country: Pakistan
- Province: Khyber Pakhtunkhwa
- Division: Dera Ismail Khan
- Established: 1893 (as an agency of Federally Administered Tribal Areas)
- Headquarters: Wanna
- Number of Tehsils: 8

Government
  - Type: District Administration
  - Deputy Commissioner: Khalid Khattak
  - District Police Officer: N/A
  - District Health Officer: N/A

Area
  - Total: 6,620 km^{2} (2,560 sq mi)

Population (2023)
  - Total: 888,675
  - Density: 134/km^{2} (348/sq mi)
- Time zone: UTC+5 (PST)
- Postal code: 29450
- Main language(s): Waziri; Pashto; Ormari
- Website: southwaziristan.kp.gov.pk

South Waziristan District (Urdu: ضلع جنوبی محسود وزیرستان) was a district in the Dera Ismail Khan Division of the Khyber Pakhtunkhwa province of Pakistan, before splitting into the Lower South Waziristan District and the Upper South Waziristan District on 13 April 2022. South Waziristan was located in the southwest of Khyber Pakhtunkhwa. It was situated between two rivers, the Tochi River to the north and the Gomal River to the south. In 1894 the Mahsud tribe under Mulla Powinda, who assumed the title Badshah-i-Taliban, attacked at Wana which led to an expedition by the British against the tribes during the cold season of 1894-1895, following on from this the agency of South Waziristan had been created with its headquarters at Wanna.

South Waziristan was dominated by the Wazir tribe while North Waziristan was dominated by the Mahsud tribe, both the tribes are the subgroups of the Waziri tribe, after whom the region "Waziristan" is named, and speak a common Waziristani dialect.

Established in 1895 and with an area of 6,619 km^{2} South Waziristan had been the largest agency in the erstwhile FATA region - it became a district in 2018 when FATA was merged into the province of Khyber Pakhtunkhwa in 2018. It was bordered by the North Waziristan district to the north, Bannu and Lakki Marwat districts to the northeast, Tank and Dera Ismail Khan districts to the east, Zhob District of Balochistan to the south and by Afghanistan to the west.

== History ==
Located near the site of the ancient Indus Valley civilization and Harappa, the region was annexed as part of a far flung satrapy by the old Persian Achaemenid Empire before 500 B.C. The Macedonians under Alexander the Great marched on the area around 330 B.C., the later Greco-Bactrians establishing an independent Indo-Greek Kingdom following a split with the Seleucid Empire to the west. Afterwards, it came under Mauryan rule. The Saka arrived around 97 B.C., before the Indo-Parthians of Arsacid affinity ruled under Gondophares to about A.D. 75. The following few centuries A.D. brought at least nominal Kushan, Ephthalite, Kidarite and Sassanian Persian rule, the last of which fell to the forces of the Arab Rashidun Caliphate, which introduced Islam to the East Iranian borderlands in the seventh century. Islam was spread further east under the Saffarid dynasty which, under Ya'qub-i Laith Saffari, pressed deep into the Khyber hinterlands. The succeeding centuries saw Ghaznavid, Ghorid, and Babar control of the area, where regional Pashtoon tribes living in and around the Hindu-Kush later battled the encroaching British India northwest of the Punjab. From then onward, the region remained under British Indian Empire rule after the 1893 Durand Line agreement, until the state of Pakistan was created.

Up to 1895, the Deputy Commissioner of Dera Ismail Khan and Bannu had controlled all political matters in Waziristan since the taking over of the Frontier from the Sikhs. These areas did not come under British control until November 1893, when the Amir of Afghanistan signed a treaty renouncing all claims to these territories. After an attack on the Delimitation Commission Escort at Wanna in 1894 and subsequent large military operations in 1894–95, a Political Agent for South Waziristan was permanently appointed with its headquarters at Wanna; another was appointed for the Tochi area (North Waziristan) with headquarters at Miramshah. The post of Resident in Waziristan was created in 1908. The Political Agent in North Waziristan was subordinate to the Resident, who was directly responsible to the Chief Commissioner of North Western Frontier Province. With the withdrawal of Indian government to the settled districts, the regular armed forces were withdrawn and, instead, a local militia was raised in 1900. However, large scale disturbances occurred in 1904 resulting in the murder of the Political Agent and Militia Commandant at Sarwakai. Later, a plot to murder all the British officers, seize the Wanna fort; and hand it over to Mullah Powindah, the self-styled king of Waziristan, was discovered. The Political Agent and the Commandant, on the same night, disarmed and dismissed all the Mahsuds from the Militia. A few months later, they were again enlisted, but were once again disbanded in 1906. In 1925 the Royal Air Force pacified Mahsud tribesmen by means of the Pink's War bombing campaign.

In the 20th century, Mirzali Khan (Faqir of Ipi), although based in Gurwek, North Waziristan, had also many followers from South Waziristan.

== Geography ==
Map of agencies and frontier regions in FATA and Khyber Pakhtunkhwa, northwest Pakistan: – South Waziristan; – FATA; – Khyber Pakhtunkhwa

The district is mostly a mass of rugged and complex hills and ridges. There are no regular mountain alignments. The land rises gradually from south and east to north and west. The dominating range is the Preghal in the west along the border with Afghanistan. It is the highest peak which is 3,515 metres high. Zarmelan, Wanna, Shakki, Zalai, Spin and Tiarza are the main plains of the district.

Direction of water courses, in general, are from west to south i.e. from the watersheds of Sulaiman Mountains to the Indus. There are two principal rivers in the district, Gomal of Luni and Tank Zam. Some important rivulets are Khaisora, Shaktu, Siplatoi, Toi Khwla, Shuza, Shinkai and Shahur. The rest are mountain streams which can become dangerous and impassable during heavy rains which frequently occur during the months of July and August. The Gomal River rises in two branches in the eastern slopes of the western Sulaiman range in the Barmal District of Afghanistan not far from the source of the Tochi River. The Tank Zam is formed by the junction of the Tauda China and the Baddar Toi, at Dwa Toi, south of Razmak.

== Administration ==
The district headquarter of the South Waziristan district was Wanna, Prior to abolition South Waziristan was divided into three administrative subdivisions of Ladha, Sarwakai, and Wanna. These three subdivisions were further divided into eight Tehsils.

- Birmil Tehsil
- Ladha Tehsil
- Makin Tehsil
- Sararogha Tehsil
- Serwekai Tehsil
- Tiarza Tehsil
- Toi Khulla Tehsil
- Wana Tehsil

The overall region of Waziristan had been divided into two "agencies": North Waziristan and South Waziristan. Primarily, two big tribes lived there. The Wazir tribe lived in south Waziristan while Mahsud tribe inhibited North Waziristan. Both the tribes are subgroups of the Waziri tribe, after whom the region "Waziristan" is named, and speak a common Waziristani dialect.

== Climate ==
The district has hot summers and very cold winters. In winter, temperatures go below freezing point in places of high altitude. The summer season starts in May and ends by September. June is generally the warmest month when the mean maximum temperature rises slightly over 30 degrees Celsius. The winter starts in October and continues until April. December, January and February are the coldest months. The mean maximum and minimum temperatures for this period are 10 and −2 degrees Celsius, respectively. The district is outside the monsoon zone, yet at higher altitudes a fair amount of rainfall is received. South Waziristan District has an arid climate, receiving minimal precipitation. The western portion, bordering Afghanistan, receives more rainfall than the eastern portion touching Tank and D.I.Khan districts due to high altitude. Most of the district receives mean annual rainfall of 150 millimetres (6 in), while a small area in the southeastern corner receives less than 250 millimetres (10 in) of rainfall annually.

== Demographics ==
Historical population
| Year | Pop. | ±% p.a. |
|---|---|---|
| 1972 | 307,514 | — |
| 1981 | 309,454 | +0.07% |
| 1998 | 429,841 | +1.95% |
| 2017 | 675,215 | +2.41% |
| 2023 | 888,675 | +4.68% |

As of the 2023 census, South Waziristan District has 178,636 households and a population of 888,675. The district has a sex ratio of 107.08 males to 100 females and a literacy rate of 31.96%: 42.63% for males and 20.38% for females. 295,611 (33.26% of the surveyed population) are under 10 years of age. The entire population lives in rural areas. In the 2023 census, 1,694 (0.19%) people in the district were from religious minorities, mainly Christians. Pashto was the predominant language, spoken by 97.99% of the population. 1.85% speak other languages, possibly Ormuri.

The two main tribes of the district are the Ahmadzai Wazir and the Mahsud. The other significant tribal populations are the Ormur (Burki or Baraki), Dotani, Sulaimankhel, Ghilji, Khomia and Taji. Some Bettani tribal people live in a strip on the south-east border, while the Ghilji are mainly settled in the south-west corner. The Dotani and Sulaimankhel tribes mainly live in Toi Khwla and Gulkuch.

== Dress and ornaments ==
The tribal people of this area wear distinctive dress. The dress of men consists of a turban smock; Shalwar and Chaddar. The smock is generally white or grey and occasionally embroidered on the chest with silk or cotton. Their Shalwars are baggy and big. Maliks and the wealthy wear white cotton smocks and carry Chaddar on their shoulders. The young educated males wear modern dress as worn by people elsewhere in the country. Women wear different colored clothes as to be identified. Married women put on dark-blue or dark-red smocks of coarse cotton. The spinsters invariably of both married and unmarried women are similar and fit closely below the knee. The married women usually wear a very huge firak called "ganr khat". The unmarried wear simple shalwar and qamees. One can easily differentiate between married and unmarried by this firak. Currently trends are changing of people and they adopt the new culture as well. in wazir etan the trend is slowly emerging but those people who migrated to other Urban areas of Pakistan they changed the fashion and also adopt the other culture. these tribe consist mainly on Mehsud and Wazir tribe. but still two main tribe of wazir e stan not change the way of living and they prefer the simplicity and traditional life (Dotani and Suleman Khel tribe).

== Food ==
The people of South Waziristan eat simple food of wheat and maize bread. They are also fond of chai (tea) and rice cooked with mutton. Pulao, a rice pilaf, with roasted meat are served on special occasions. But the main one is Sohbat of Mahsud tribals. The famous food of Dotani and suleman khel tribe is "Korrat", the half white rice mix up with "ghee" which is made from cow milk and second is Bar be Q of Goat.

== Economy ==
The majority of Wazirs Mahsuds, Dotani and suleimankhail of South Waziristan are pastoral. The Wazirs breed cows and sheep and earn their livelihood from sheep-rearing. Suleimankhail are also horses and sheep and some go to different parts of Punjab in summers and most of them are in Iran to earn their livelihood. A large number of Mahsuds are employed in the Army, as levies and Khassadars in militia and scouts. Mahsuds have also taken to business in Tank and Dera Ismail Khan driving buses and trucks. The district also produces or trades charcoal, wool, potatoes, chilghozas and a few varieties of locally grown fruit.

=== Mining ===
There is hardly significant mining to be mentioned. Coal mines have been discovered in the Wazir area of Neeli Kach Tehsil Wanna. Copper is found in Preghal and Spin Kamar. Chromite in area Sarah Khuara near Dre Nashter.

== Places of interest ==
Wanna is the summer headquarters of the district. The Historic Gomal Pass is mentioned by a famous diplomats and writer Dr Shamshad as an entry point of the Shahab- u- Din Ghouri's attacking army in 1192 AD. Ghouris travelled through south Waziristan and attacked India. Moreover, Musa Qala fort or the house of Pir Bagdadi near WANA bazar is also important place in SWD. Likewise, the check posts of British army built on various immensely tall mountains give evidence of the expertise of British army. The Red Bridge, locally known as seer Pall, at Tiarza is a remarkable sign of UK construction in the region. The Village Ghowa Khawa is also a very important place. Ali wazir who is the MNA and leader of PTM belongs to this village. Besides, famous lawyers of SWD Bar like Advocate Fida Hussain wazir were born here in Ghowa Khawa.

It is an important tehsil and a camp similar to Razmak. The population is mostly of Ahmadzai Wazirs. It has a vast plain with extensive valleys surrounded on all sides by hills. It is an important industrial and agricultural center. Khaisur, Osspass, karama, Ladha, Makin, Sararogha, Azamwarsak and Angur Ada are also important places of the district. Kaniguram is inhabited principally by a tribe called Burki. There are some Mahsuds who also live there but no others. Recently in a local clash the Malik din Khel clan of Mahsuds annexed many parts of Burkis on which the Malik Din Khels have built their own houses. It is, population-wise, the largest habitation in South Waziristan at 7,000 feet (2,100 m) above sea level. The tribesmen manufacture small arms and knives, which are most known for their finish and performance and much-liked by tourists and foreigners.

== Administration ==
The civil administration of South Waziristan Agency has been functioning since 1895 under a Political Agent who administers civil criminal and revenue cases in accordance with the Frontier Crimes Regulations and Customary Law. The Agency is divided into the three administrative subdivisions of Ladha, Sarwakai, and Wanna. These three subdivisions are further divided into eight Tehsils: Ladha, Makin, Sararogha, Sarwakai, Tiarza, Wanna, Barmal, and Toi Khwla.

The subdivision of Sarwakai is administered by Assistant Political Officer, whereas the subdivisions of Ladha and Wanna are administered by Assistant Political Agents. Each tehsil is headed by a Political Naib Tehsildar. The Malik system introduced by the British government is functioning Agency. Maliks used to work like media between administrations and the (Qaum) or Tribe. A Maliki is hereditary and devolves on the son and his son so on and so forth for which regular benefits and subsidies are sanctioned from time to time. Lungi system known as Sufaid Resh is slightly lower form of Maliki.

=== Provincial Assembly ===
| Member of Provincial Assembly | Party affiliation | Constituency | Year |
|---|---|---|---|
| Hafiz Islam Uddin | Jamiat Ulema-e-Islam (F) | PK-113 South Waziristan-I | 2018 |
| Naseer Ullah Khan | Pakistan Tehreek-e-Insaf | PK-114 South Waziristan-II | 2018 |

== Pakistan's new Waziristan strategy ==
On 4 June 2007, the National Security Council of Pakistan met to decide the fate of Waziristan and take up a number of political and administrative decisions to control "Talibanization" of the area. The meeting was chaired by President Pervez Musharraf and it was attended by the Chief Ministers and Governors of all four provinces. They discussed the deteriorating law and order situation and the threat posed to state security.

The government decided to take a number of actions to stop the "Talibanization" and crush the armed militancy in the Tribal regions and Khyber-Pakhtunkhwa.

The NSC of Pakistan has decided the following actions will be taken to achieve the goals:

- Deployment of unmanned reconnaissance planes
- Strengthening law enforcement agencies with advanced equipment
- Deployment of more troops to the region
- Operations against militants on fast-track basis
- Focused operations against militant commanders
- Action against madrasahs preaching militancy
- Appointment of regional coordinators
- Fresh recruitment of police officers in Khyber-Pakhtunkhwa

The Ministry of Interior has played a large part in the information gathering for the operations against militants and their institutions. The Ministry of Interior has prepared a list of militant commanders operating in the region and they have also prepared a list of seminaries for monitoring.

The government is also trying to strengthen the law enforcement in the area by providing Khyber-Pakhtunkhwa Police with weapons, bulletproof jackets and night-vision devices. The paramilitary Frontier Corps will be provided with artillery and Armored Personnel Carriers (APCs). The state agencies are also studying ways to block broadcasting of illegal FM radio channels.

A major military offensive was launched in the area by the Pakistani army on 17 October 2009. ISPR on 2 November told the media about involvement of Indian's in South Waziristan had been found. A Qari Imran training camp was located in South Waziristan.

The Taliban has been dislodged from the area. However, reports that appeared in 2012 suggested that only one out of six subdivisions has been de-notified as conflict zone. Army has control over the main roads and strategic hilltops while TTP militants have safe havens in the valleys.

== See also ==
- Battle of Wanna
- Dera Ismail Khan Division
- Bannu District
- North Waziristan District
