= Mulla Powinda =

Afghan religious leader in the Mahsud tribe

- Born: Mohiuddin Maseed; 1863; Marobi Shabikhel, Makin Subdivision of South Waziristan
- Died: 1913 (aged 49–50)
- Other names: Mullah Powindah, Selani Mulla, Shahninshah-i-Taliban
- Occupations: Religious leader and freedom fighter

Mulla Powinda (Pashto: ملا پوونده) or Mullah Powindah, born Mohiuddin Maseed (Pashto: محي الدين ماسيد) (1863–1913), was a religious leader and a freedom fighter from the Pashtun tribe of the Shabi khel Mahsuds, based in Waziristan. He was from Marobi Shabikhel, a village in the present-day Makin Subdivision of South Waziristan. He led a long-standing guerrilla insurgency against the British colonial forces in the late 19th century. And came to prominence by getting the two elders of the Jirga, who were responsible for handing over two Mahsuds wanted by the British authorities for killing a British officer of the Works department. to the Political Agent in 1893.

Mullah Powindah used the Tochi Valley of North Waziristan as his centre of operations and incited people from the area to revolt in Jihad against the British. He became known first as the Selani Mulla and later as Mulla Powinda rather than by his rarely used real name of Mohiuddin."

== Clash with the British ==
The British did not like his increasing popularity. They were already aware of the resistance from the Wazirs. In 1894, 2,000 Mahsud youths had raided the British Cantonment, of the Durand Force and the mastermind of the raid, was this Mullah Pawinda and the field commander of the Lashkar was an Abdur Rahman Khel Mahsud named Jaggar British losses at the hand of these Mujahideen in Wana were still fresh in their minds. After this incident, a Mr. Bruce was named the Political Agent to the South Waziristan agency. He had already played a major role in the success of the Sandeman policy in Balochistan.

However, Bruce knew it would be difficult to handle the tribes. Unlike Balochistan; where sardars wield the power, whereas in the Mahsud and Wazir tribes had power in the Jirga; where every single youth was an important member. As soon as Bruce was appointed, a group of five Wazirs assassinated the British officer in charge of the constructions and communications department. Bruce pressured the Maliks to bring forward the accused in a Jirga and punish them. The Mahsud tribe yielded under pressure and brought forward the five accused. They were each given seven years imprisonment.

When Mulla Powindah learned of this, he understood it as an act of submitting to the authority of the British. He announced that no one was to carry out this punishment. At this, the public surrounded the abodes of each of the Maliks who had announced the punishment. Three of them were executed for treason and the other two vanished fearing their lives. Along with this, Mulla Powinda also sent a letter to the political agent Mr. Brucc through his trusted nephew Mulla Abdul Hakeem. In the letter, he told the Political Agent to release the five tribesmen. At the time of receiving the letter. Mr. Bruce was again planning to recapture areas outside Wana. In the same letter Mulla Powinda also told him to stay clear of Wana.

As expected, Bruce did not pay much attention to these warnings and sent an insulting reply to Mulla Powinda. After the failure of these peace talks, Mulla Powinda decided to inflict a sudden strike on the British to convince them to take him seriously.

Early morning on 2 November 1894, the British officers were still asleep in the Wana cantonment. Suddenly, a Lashkar of Mahsud Mujahideen organized by Mullah Powinda made a surprise attack. Such was the ferocity and quickness of the strike that the British forces couldn't make proper decisions on how to react.

According to the Pioneer (published from Allahabad, India), the number of Mujahideen was around 1000. Caroe gives the figure of 2000 while describing the detail of the event, how the drumming, shouting and firing Mujahideen caught the British by surprise. The article reported at least 100 British officers and soldiers killed and 200+ wounded. Masuds also suffered 350 casualties during their withdrawal to their area because Wana lies in Wazir area.

== 1900–1902 war ==
Following a punitive expedition in 1900–1902, the Mahsud had signed a peace agreement with the British authorities, bringing conflict to an end for the time being.

== Death ==
Mulla died in November 1913, and was succeeded as chieftain by his second surviving son, Fazl-Din, who was 14 or 15 years of age at this time.

== See also ==
- Mirzali Khan
- Sartor Faqir
- Umra Khan
