= Gulalai Ismail =

Pakistani human rights and peace activist

- ګلالۍ اسماعیل
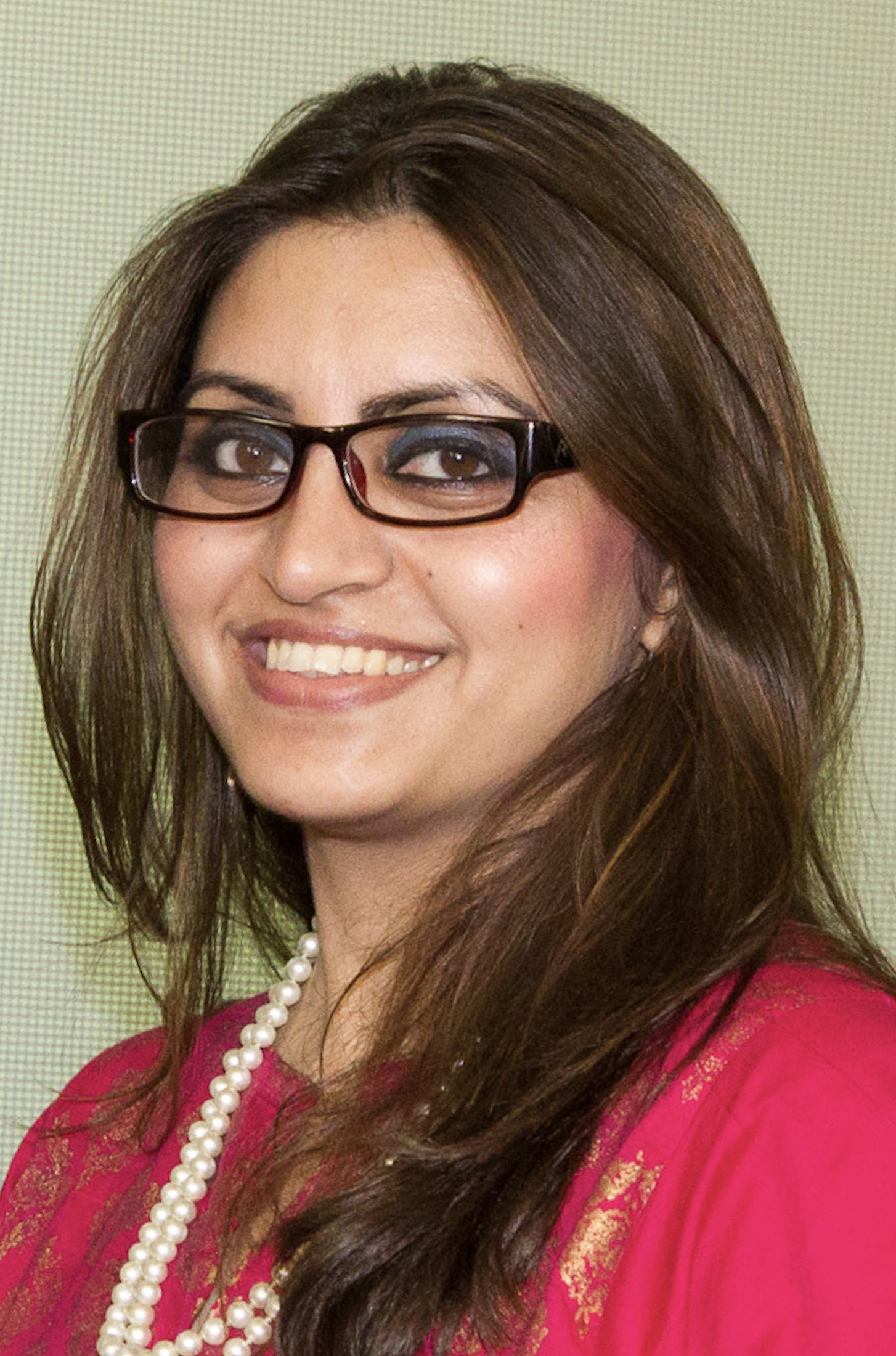
- Born: 30 October 1986 (age 39); Swabi, Khyber Pakhtunkhwa, Pakistan
- Education: Josef Korbel School of International Studies at the University of Denver; Quaid-i-Azam University
- Occupation: Human rights activist
- Organization(s): Aware Girls; Humanists International
- Movement: Pashtun Tahafuz Movement
- Parents: Muhammad Ismail (father); Uzlifat Ismail (mother)
- Relatives: Saba Ismail (sister)
- Family: Saba Ismail (sister)
- Awards: International Humanist of the Year Award (2014); Commonwealth Youth Award for Asia (2015); Chirac Prize for Conflict Prevention (2016); Anna Politkovskaya Award (2017)
- Website: awaregirls.org

Gulalai Ismail (Pashto: ګلالۍ اسماعیل; Urdu: گلالئی اسماعیل; born 30 October 1986) is a Pakistani human rights activist from Khyber Pakhtunkhwa. She is the chairperson of Aware Girls, a global ambassador for Humanists International, and a leading member of the Pashtun Tahafuz Movement (PTM). She speaks on the subject of promoting peace and women's empowerment at conferences internationally, and is the recipient of the International Humanist of the Year Award, the Chirac Prize for Conflict Prevention, and the Anna Politkovskaya Award.

In 2019, during the government of Prime Minister Imran Khan, Ismail fled Pakistan and took refuge in the United States after fearing for her life for speaking out against sexual assaults and disappearances allegedly carried out by the Pakistani military. In March 2021, she became a global ambassador for Humanists International.

== Early life and activism ==
Ismail was born to a Pashtun family in Swabi and from the age of nine was brought up in Peshawar, Khyber Pakhtunkhwa. The daughter of teacher and human rights activist Muhammad Ismail, she was educated from a young age about gender discrimination and women's rights. She graduated from Quaid-i-Azam University in Islamabad in 2012 with a Master of Philosophy degree in biotechnology.

In 2002, when she was a 16-year-old first-year pre-medical student at Frontier College for Women, Peshawar, she founded the non-governmental organization Aware Girls with her 15-year-old sister Saba Ismail, aiming to challenge the culture of violence and the oppression of women in Khyber Pakhtunkhwa. Ismail aimed to bring peace activists together in order to discuss ways to promote peaceful resistance to the Pakistani Taliban and encourage more women into politics, and investigate the psychological impact of terrorism on children and families. Malala Yousafzai, the youngest Nobel Prize laureate, who was shot by the Pakistani Taliban at the age of 15 in 2012 because of her activism for female education, was an attendee of Aware Girls in 2011. In an interview in 2011, Ismail said:

I set up Aware Girls when I was 16 because all around me, I saw girls being treated differently to boys. My girl cousin was 15 when her marriage was arranged to someone twice her age; she couldn't finish her education while my boy cousins were [doing so]. This was considered normal. Girls have internalised all this discrimination – a woman who suffers violence but doesn't say anything is much admired in the village as a role model. A good woman submits to her husband or father. Aware Girls raised awareness of equal status. We did training that women have human rights and taught leadership skills and how to negotiate with their families and with their parents to get an education and to have control over their own lives.

Ismail's organisation widened its scope to include education on topics such as access to HIV and AIDS prevention and treatment, access to safe abortions, and she continues to speak at international conferences to promote awareness of peace-building, tolerance and women's rights. Both Gulalai and her sister Saba Ismail have also acted as advisers on peace and women's rights to the United Nations and US governmental departments. In 2013, Ismail set up the Marastyal Helpline to give advice and assistance to women at risk from, and victims of, gender-based violence. The service operates from Peshawar and gives advice on legal and medical aid as well as emergency ambulance information and emotional counseling. Ismail criticised the British government's prevent strategy, saying it could lead to alienation of Muslims and could turn vulnerable individuals towards extremism. Ismail also spoke out against the laws of blasphemy in Pakistan and the effect this had on progressive speech, secular activism, and the safety of secular activists. She said: "I am convinced that without a secular democracy, we will not achieve peace in Pakistan."

In addition to Aware Girls, which she continues to chair, Ismail set up the Seeds of Peace Network in 2010, training young people in human rights and political leadership, encouraging the participation of women in politics in Pakistan, and encouraging tolerance between people of differing faiths. Seeds of Peace was a response to what Ismail saw as the increased "Talibanisation" of young men and women vulnerable to militants in Swabi District and other Pashtun rural areas. According to the World Humanist Congress, "her work is characterised by promoting peace and pluralism; challenging religious extremism and militancy; promoting good governance in areas stricken by militancy; providing civic education to young people; strengthening democracy; and political mainstreaming of young women." Between 2009 and 2011, Ismail was on the Executive Committee of the Young Humanists International, and between 2010 and 2012 she was a Board Member of the Women's Global Network for Reproductive Rights. She also works for the Gender Working Group of the United Network of Young Peacebuilders (UNOY), and is a member of the Asian Democracy Network. Ismail was a board member of Humanists International from 2017 until 2021 and now serves as its global ambassador.

Aware Girls have been forced to organise their community meetings by invitation only, in hotel rooms protected by armed guards, where they know the owners and staff. Its delegates suspect they are being monitored by Pakistan's intelligence agency, Inter-Services Intelligence (ISI). Ismail has been threatened and forced to flee her home in the past because of her activism. On 16 May 2014, four armed gunmen attempted to force their way into her family home in Peshawar, shouting for Ismail who was luckily not home at the time; she had been delayed at the airport because she had lost her luggage after a flight. The gunmen were making threats and started shooting guns into the air when her father refused to open the door. "I thought that sooner or later I’d be attacked, but I never thought it would happen to my family," Gulalai Ismail said. She did not know if the gunmen were Taliban, Pakistan's security services, or criminals trying to kidnap her for ransom. “We cannot trust anyone,” she added. In an interview with the BBC, she said:

I am aware that the security risks are high. At times, I am afraid for the lives of my family. We had to relocate ourselves, again and again, we had to change our home because of the insecurities. One of the positive messages which it gives me is that the impact of my work is huge and they want to create fear in my heart so that I become silenced.

== Intimidation and detentions ==
In November 2017, the head of a Pakistani youth parliament in Mardan, Hamza Khan, falsely accused Ismail of blasphemy, a charge which in Pakistan carried the death penalty, and urged his followers to kill her. The accuser was seemingly unhappy with her activism. Ismail denied the blasphemy allegation and in February 2018 filed a legal case against the accuser, after which he was arrested by the police. In a statement, Ismail said: "I stand not only for myself – this legal move will give voice to other people in Pakistan who are falsely charged with blasphemy." Blaming the system of education in Pakistan, Ismail said, "it’s not the fault of Hamza Khan or his friends. The real perpetrator is the state that intentionally indoctrinates our children and youth in educational institutions."

On 12 August 2018, she delivered a speech at the PTM public gathering in Swabi, which was organised by the Pashtun Tahafuz Movement (PTM) to commemorate the 70th anniversary of the 1948 Babrra massacre. Ismail and 18 other PTM activists were charged with making "anti-state" and "anti-military" comments at the rally.

In October 2018, when she returned from attending a Humanists UK conference in the United Kingdom, Ismail was detained by airport officials at Islamabad International Airport in Islamabad and her passport was withheld from her. After detention, she was released on bail. The airport officials said her name had been on the Exit Control List (ECL), barring her from leaving Pakistan. Her legal representative petitioned the Islamabad High Court to have her passport and travel documents returned to her and her name removed from the ECL on the grounds that it was a violation of basic human rights.

It was revealed during proceedings that Pakistan's premier intelligence agency, Inter-Services Intelligence (ISI), had instructed the Federal Investigation Agency to place her name on the ECL. In November 2018, she was taken to ISI headquarters. "They told my father that if you do not make sure that your daughter is silenced, we are going to kill her," Gulalai Ismail said. On 14 March 2019, the court set aside the decision to place her on the ECL as she had not been given an opportunity of a hearing as required by Section 8 of the Passport Act 1974 and directed that her passport be returned to her. The court, however, allowed that her passport might be confiscated at a later date if the correct procedures are followed.

On 18 January 2019, a video surfaced in which a 13-year-old boy, Hayat Khan from Khaisor, North Waziristan, said Pakistani security forces had arrested his father and brother, and that his family had been facing harassment due to frequent visits by two security personnel to his home when he was the only male among the females present at home. On 27 January, Ismail visited Khaisor along with five other female PTM activists, Ismat Shahjahan, Bushra Gohar, Jamila Gilani, Sanna Ejaz and Nargis Afsheen Khattak, to express solidarity with Hayat's mother and to also interview the local women about other incidents of sexual harassment. Ismail said that due to the bombing of their homes by the armed forces, "the mental health of women from the tribal areas has deteriorated so much that they cannot endure another day of war.” Ismat Shahjahan added, "[dozens of] women came out of their homes when we visited them, pleaded and cried, and asked us to help them bring their missing sons back. We cried with them."

On 6 February 2019, Ismail was arrested outside the National Press Club in Islamabad along with dozens of other PTM activists including Abdullah Nangyal, at an event protesting the murder of Pashtun rights activist Arman Loni. Ismail was shifted to an undisclosed location after her arrest. During the detention, she was kept hungry and thirsty for two days in a cold, dirty room which had a urine-soaked carpet. The arrests received widespread criticism in Pakistan and internationally, including condemnation from Afghan President Ashraf Ghani, Amnesty International, and the Pakistan Peoples Party (PPP).

On 23 May 2019, as Ismail and other activists were protesting in Islamabad against the murder of Farishta Momand – a 10-year-old Pashtun girl who had been abducted in Islamabad, allegedly raped, and then killed with a knife and thrown in a forest where animals ravaged her body – Ismail became the subject of another first information report for allegedly defaming state institutions during the protest rally against Farishta's murder. According to Farishta's family, the child was reported missing on 15 May, but the police refused to investigate the case or register a missing person report for five days. Farishta's father told the BBC that the police did not take the case seriously, and instead the police would ask him to "carry out chores for them around the police station for several days, including cleaning their offices and bringing them fruit for their iftar [fast-breaking dinner during Ramadan]." Because of the protests against Farishta's murder, Ismail received a 30-day travel ban and a further application was raised to block her social media accounts. Justice Aamer Farooq of the Islamabad High Court remarked that it was necessary to take appropriate action if anybody talked against the state or its institutions. Besides Ismail, the court also issued notices to her fellow PTM leaders Manzoor Pashteen, Ali Wazir and Mohsin Dawar.

After the Kharqamar incident on 26 May 2019, the government intensified its crackdown on PTM, arresting Ali Wazir, Mohsin Dawar and other PTM activists. Because of receiving death threats and the treason allegations against her, Ismail decided to go into hiding. On 10 June 2019, several local news outlets reported that Ismail was arrested in Peshawar but her father said the news had not been confirmed by the police. Her father told the Voice of America: "Last night, police raided our relatives and family friends’ houses in Peshawar in an attempt to arrest her, but she was not there. I have no contact with her and don’t know her whereabouts." A massive police operation was launched to find her but she was able to evade capture, eventually able to cross out of Pakistan. Ismail's family and relatives, however, were kept under digital and physical surveillance for several months, with raids on her family home and torture of her friends in an attempt to get information about her. In July 2019, Humanists International and more than 40 other humanist organizations signed an open letter to the United States Congress, urging it to intervene and question the visiting Pakistani delegation in the US led by prime minister Imran Khan. Humanists International’s director of advocacy, Elizabeth O’Casey, made a statement to the United Nations Human Rights Council, saying "we call on Pakistan, a member of this Council, to revoke the charges against Gulalai with urgency, to instead protect and cherish a citizen who speaks truth to power in defence of countless women and girls." After staying in hiding for four months, Gulalai Ismail took refuge in New York, US in September 2019. She said, "if I had ended up in prison and tortured for many years, my voice would have been silenced. The last few months have been awful. I have been threatened, harassed, and I am lucky to be alive."

After she went into hiding, both of Gulalai Ismail's parents were charged with "terrorism financing" in a case that lasted for more than a year. The Ismail family said their home in Islamabad was raided by security forces five times while she was in hiding. "They all come in, in plain-clothes with their guns out. They surround the area, with 30 or 40 vehicles. Everyone comes out and enters the house, searching from the bathrooms to the roof," her father said. However, the Pakistan Army spokesman Major General Asif Ghafoor denied that the military had any role in the raids. In July 2020, a Peshawar anti-terrorism court judge dismissed the case against her parents for lack of evidence, but a few weeks later, authorities re-filed the case with the additional allegation that her parents had directly facilitated the Pakistani Taliban in the Peshawar church bombing in 2013 and the Peshawar Shia mosque attack in 2015. The charges were refuted by the Ismail family.

Separately, her father, retired professor Muhammad Ismail, was also charged with sharing "anti-state content" on social media and expressing dissent against the government. In January 2021, a judge ordered him to "stop sharing objectionable content." After the hearing of the case, Muhammad Ismail told Al Jazeera: "Honouring the orders of the court, I hereby surrender my right to share my dissident voices on social media, therefore I say goodbye to Facebook and Twitter." On 2 February 2021, Muhammad Ismail was again arrested on terrorism charges, which rights groups said was part of a sustained campaign of judicial harassment against him. After spending more than two months in jail, he was released on bail on 15 April 2021. Gulalai Ismail said, "my father’s bail is a relief, but his health is fragile and even after the release he will have to attend the trial court dates on daily basis, which will have a huge toll on his already deteriorating health."

== Awards and recognition ==
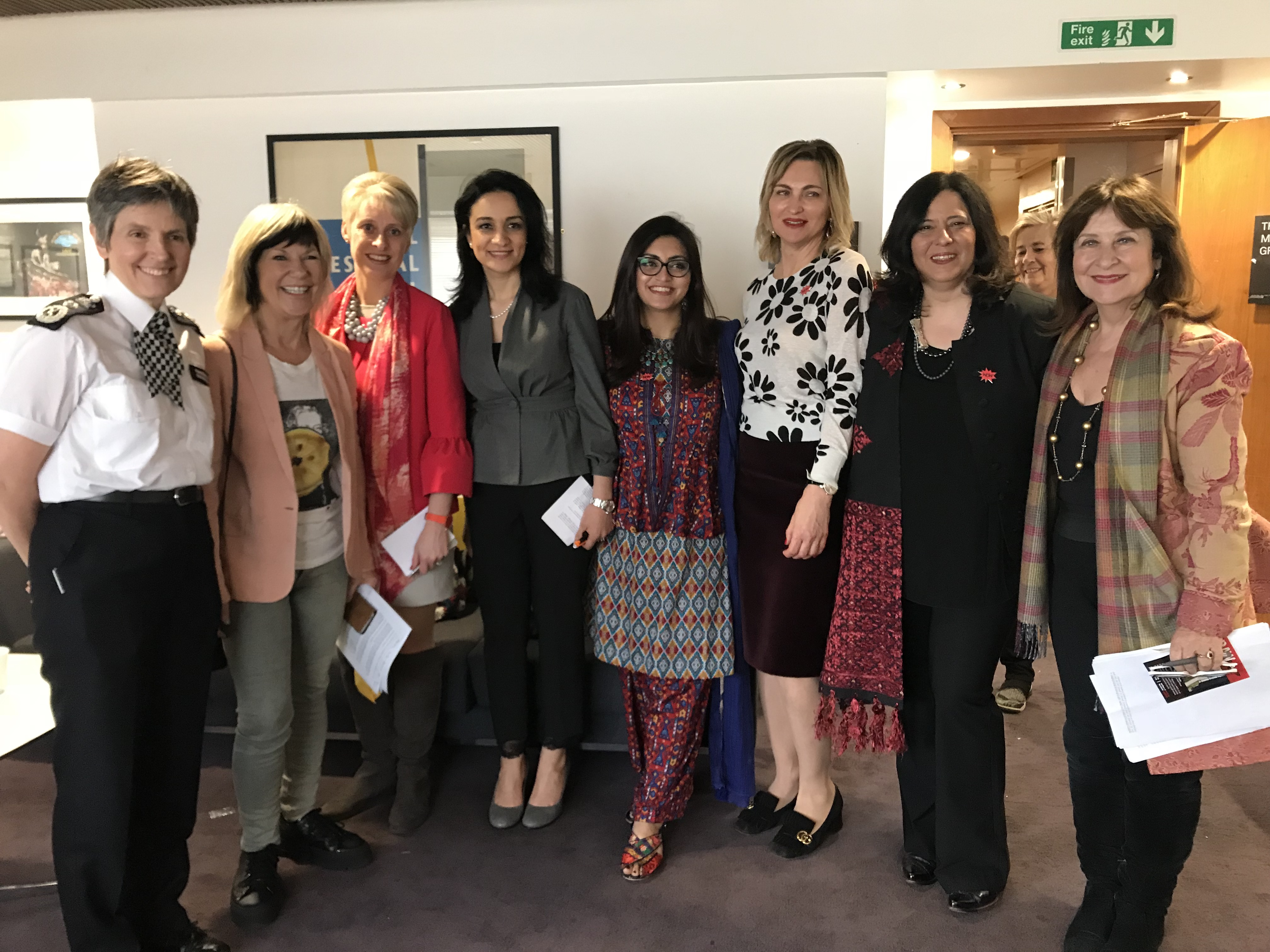
Gulalai Ismail (center) received the 2017 Anna Politkovskaya Award at the Women of the World Festival in London in March 2018.

Ismail won the 2009 YouthActionNet Fellowship and the 2010 Paragon Fellowship. She was recognised as an Agent of Change by the British High Commission, Islamabad.

In 2013, she received the Democracy Award from the National Endowment for Democracy, and was acknowledged as one of the 100 Leading Global Thinkers of 2013 by Foreign Policy magazine.

In August 2014, she was awarded the International Humanist of the Year Award by Humanists International at the World Humanist Congress in Oxford, England. She was elected to Humanists International's Board of Directors in 2017. In 2021, she was appointed Humanists International's first ever Ambassador.

In recognition of her efforts to further women's empowerment, she received the 2015 Asia Region Commonwealth Youth Award for Excellence in Development, under the theme of Democracy and Human Rights.

In 2016, her organisation Aware Girls was awarded the Fondation Chirac Peace Prize for Conflict Prevention, which was presented to Ismail by the then French president Francois Hollande.

In 2017, Ismail was the joint winner, along with the murdered Indian journalist-turned-activist Gauri Lankesh, of the Anna Politkovskaya Award, Reach All Women in War (RAW in WAR) award, for campaigning against religious extremism.

== See also ==
- Malala Yousafzai
- Sanna Ejaz
- Bushra Gohar
- Asma Jahangir
- Fouzia Saeed
