= Saba Ismail =

Pakistani human-rights activist

- Born: 1987 or 1988; Swabi, Khyber Pakhtunkhwa, Pakistan
- Education: Josef Korbel School of International Studies
- Organization: Aware Girls
- Family: Gulalai Ismail (sister)
- Awards: Democracy Award, National Endowment for Democracy (2013)

Saba Ismail (born 1987 or 1988) is a Pakistani human-rights activist who co-founded Aware Girls with her sister Gulalai Ismail in 2002.

She is the 2013 winner of the National Endowment for Democracy's Democracy Award.

== Biography ==
Saba Ismail was born in 1987 or 1988 in Northwest Pakistan to father Muhammad Ismail, an activist and teacher with progressive values. She grew up with her several siblings including her sister Gulalai who is two years older. In 2017, Saba spoke about peace-building on a panel with Melinda Gates at the White House.

Saba co-founded the women's rights organisation Aware Girls with Gulalai in 2002, when both sisters were teenagers, Saba then being 15. The organisation supports Pakistani women facing gender-based violence and promotes peace-building and gender equity in politics. Specific activities also include advocacy against honour killings, acid attacks, and modern slavery. Saba also helped set up Dignity Project, an initiative that amplifies the voices of women from South Asia.

In 2018, Saba lived in Brooklyn, New York City. In 2023, she was studying for a master's degree in international human rights at the University of Denver's Josef Korbel School of International Studies.

== Awards ==
Saba was featured in Foreign Policy's list of "Leading Global Thinkers", and in 2013, she received the National Endowment for Democracy's Democracy Award.

Saba won the Fondation Chirac's Chirac Prize for Conflict Prevention. The award was given at a November 2016 ceremony in the Quai Branly Museum by Christine Albanel.
