= Leeds Atheist Society =

Club at the University of Leeds

Leeds Atheist Society is a Leeds University Union affiliated free thinking student society based at the University of Leeds. It was founded in 2006 and has since grown to become the most active free thinking student society in the United Kingdom as well as being instrumental in the foundation of the National Federation of Atheist, Humanist and Secular Student Societies.

== Activities ==
As well as the group's regular activities, the society has developed and piloted many events which have gone on to be used on a national level by other groups in the United Kingdom. In particular the group was the first to develop the concept of a non-belief awareness week which has since been adopted by groups at the University of Southampton, Durham University, University of Liverpool and on a national level by the British Humanist Association. They are regular supporters of the annual charity week run by the AHS, Non-Prophet Week.

In April 2009 the group appointed their first humanist chaplain, Nicola Jackson, in 2010.

The group also began an annual irreligious camping weekend, which was later run by the AHS and named Questival.

== Controversy ==
The group has faced controversy during several times in its history. In 2007 the group ran a talk entitled "I'll Mock Muhammad if I want to" as a talk on freedom of speech following the Jyllands-Posten Muhammad cartoons controversy. The talk itself did not contain any of the cartoons.

The group ran into further controversy in 2008 when the president submitted a motion for the Leeds University Union referendum to stop selling Halal and Kosher meat following the Farm Animal Welfare Council's recommendations in 2004 that such practices were unethical and should be stopped. The motion was rejected by the union council before going to ballot.

The group has also been the victim of several controversial events. In 2007 the group filed a discrimination complaint against the interfaith chair. In 2009 the group's awareness week was overshadowed by death threats made against society members and vandalism of the society's property following a heated debate with the Islamic Society.

The group has also faced regular theft or defacement of its banners and posters.
