= International Safe Abortion Day =

Abortion advocacy day

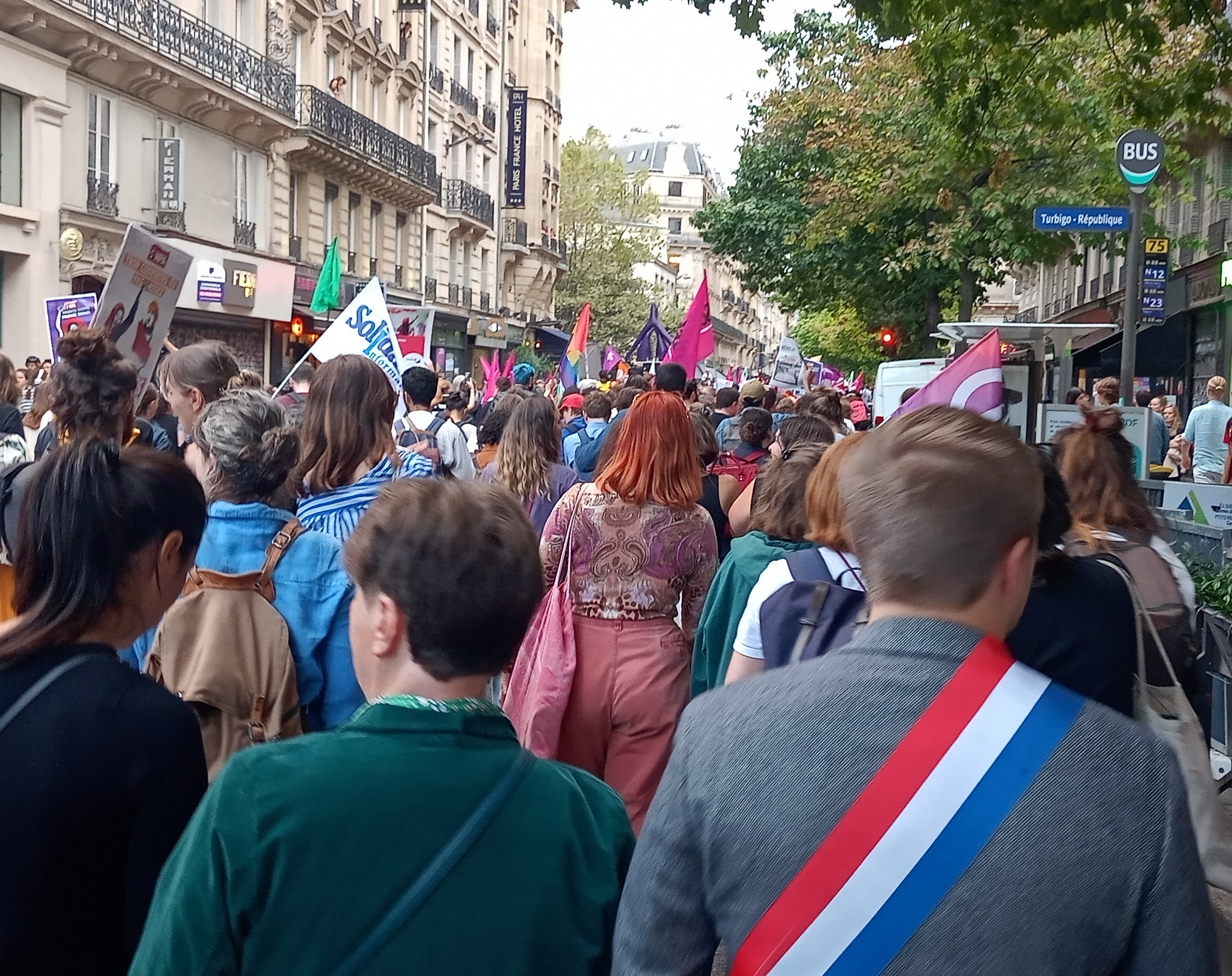
Parade for Safe Abortion Day in Paris (September 28, 2023)

28 September is International Safe Abortion Day. The day was first celebrated as a day of action for decriminalization of abortion in Latin America and the Caribbean in 1990 by the Campaña 28 Septiembre. In 2011, the Women's Global Network for Reproductive Rights (WGNRR) declared 28 September as an international day. The date was chosen to commemorate the passing of the Law of Free Birth passed by the Brazilian parliament on September 28, 1871. This law was a key legal reform intended to provide freedom for the children of enslaved people in Brazil at the time.

The day's name was changed to International Safe Abortion Day in 2015; that year 83 activities were organised in 47 countries by national, regional and international NGOs and activists. 2016 was the biggest International Safe Abortion Day ever celebrated.

In 2018, September 28 marked a mobilisation in Argentina against the cuts made to the Ministry of Health by the conservative government. These cuts had substantial impacts on women's welfare and access to abortions in the country.

In 2019, Malta held its first protest in favour of the legalisation of abortion; it was held on 28 September to commemorate International Safe Abortion Day.

In 2021, rallies across Latin America were held on International Safe Abortion Day in support of abortion rights. Thousands marched in protest in countries including El Salvador, Chile and Mexico to pressure lawmakers to ease punitive abortion laws.

In 2023, the WHO drafted a report on a range of actions needed to address barriers to quality abortion care. Many of these actions are directly reflected in the WHO Abortion care guideline, and the WHO/IBP implementation stories provide captivating examples of how these issues have concretely been addressed at country and local level:

- Decriminalization of abortion and removal of laws and policies that are barriers to access.
- Empowering, supporting and protecting abortion care providers.
- Ensuring access to self-management of abortion as an option to access medical abortion care.
- Ensuring access to post-abortion care.
- Involving and reaching youth to safeguard abortion access for all.
