= Hamida Aman =

Afghan entrepreneur (born 1973)

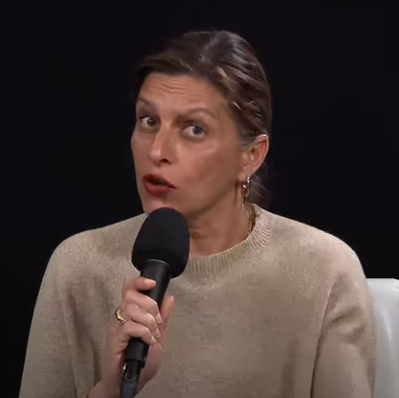
- Born: 26 April 1974 (age 51); Kabul
- Citizenship: Afghan Swiss
- Education: University of Lausanne
- Occupations: women's rights activist, media entrepreneur, journalist and founder of Begum Organization for Women
- Known for: starting Radio Begum for girls in Afghanistan
- Television: Begum TV
- Spouse: Christian Marie
- Children: 2 kids
- Website: https://begum.ngo/

Hamida Aman is an Afghan media entrepreneur and founder of the Begum Organization for Women who has made significant contributions to Afghan women's rights. In 2024, she was recognized as one of the BBC's 100 inspirational women.

== Biography ==
Aman was born in Kabul on 26 April 1974. Her family fled the country due to the war, finding refuge in Switzerland when she was eight. She grew up in Lausanne, studied journalism, and worked for the Swiss press. When the Taliban regime fell at the end of 2001, she returned to Kabul, where she worked for various international NGOs supporting Afghan media's development.

In 2004, she created Awaz ("the voice" in the Dari language), a small audiovisual production company, which within a few years became a significant actor in Afghanistan's media and entertainment industry.

In 2020, together with others, she founded the Begum Organization for Women. This organization aims to defend Afghan women's rights through various media.

When American forces withdrew from Afghanistan in August 2021, Hamida had already launched Radio Begum in the preceding March. The Taliban's approach to governance led to what was later termed gender apartheid, as women were excluded from public life, and secondary schools and universities were reserved for boys and men.

=== Awaz Communication ===
In 2004, Hamida Aman founded the audiovisual production company Awaz Communication, which is dedicated to supporting the development of Afghan institutions and media. She appointed Arif Ahmadi as the director of the Kabul office. The company grew to employ 150 people, strongly emphasizing hiring women. One of its most successful productions was the reality TV show Réaction, which embedded itself with police patrols.

=== Begum Academy ===
Launched in November 2023, this initiative aims to make education accessible to Afghan middle and high school girls deprived of schooling since August 2021 and for the Afghan population as a whole.

The Begum Academy digital platform was specifically designed to be user-friendly for an audience with limited digital literacy.

=== Begum TV ===
The satellite channel was launched on March 8, 2024 - International Women’s Day. The TV channel continues the mission of the two other programs, Radio Begum and Begum Academy, by broadcasting video lessons from Begum Academy and offering educational and entertaining content for the whole family.

By 2023, nearly one in two Afghan households will have access to a satellite connection. It allows for more flexible broadcasting as the channel airs from Paris, where programs are recorded by the Afghan journalist teams of BOW (Begum Organization for Women).
