= Radio Begum =

Afghan radio station

- Region served: Afghanistan
- Services: Educational radio broadcasts
- Official language: Pashto, Dari
- Funding: International Programme for the Development of Communication of Unesco, EU, Malala Fund, private donation
- Website: https://begum.ngo/our-story

Radio Begum is an Afghan radio station made by women, for women. It was created on 8 March 2021 to coincide with International Women's Day by Afghan entrepreneur and journalist Hamida Aman, and is run by Begum Organization for Women (called BOW) which had been founded on 8 December 2020. It broadcasts live and continuously via both FM and satellite, to Kabul and more rural surroundings, covering approximately three quarters of the country. On 8 March 2024 its sister broadcaster Begum TV was launched in Paris with a grant from Malala Fund, to provide video courses covering the Afghan school curriculum from 7th to 12th Grade by satellite.

== Origin ==
The station was launched on 8 March 2021 to coincide with International Women's Day, in the context of the possible return to power of the Taliban, which when previously in power had suppressed women's education. Begum means princess or a woman of high status or responsibility.

== Broadcast and programming ==
In 2023, the radio station was heard daily by approximately 600,000 households thanks to its six transmitters, having permission to use another four. According to its founder, Radio Begum was the number one private radio station in Afghanistan.

The station offered courses for middle and high school students who had been deprived of education since the return of the Taliban to power on 15 August 2021. Programs were offered in the two official languages of the country: in Dari in the morning and in Pashto in the afternoon.

Radio Begum continued to broadcast despite limitations being focus on education, offer topics aimed at women, and have a separate space for women. But in November 2021, it broadcast Afghan or foreign music but only religious music that glorifies the prophet and God.

== Suspension ==
On 4 February 2025, the Taliban ordered the suspension of operations of Radio Begum for “unauthorized provision” of content and programming to an overseas TV channel. The radio station resumed broadcasting on 23 February after giving assurances to the authorities.

== See also ==
- Outline of Afghanistan
