= Non-Prophet Week =

UK and Ireland annual charity week

Campaign logo.

Non-Prophet Week is an annual charity week for the irreligious in the United Kingdom and Ireland, and is coordinated by the Humanist Students (formally The National Federation of Atheist, Humanist and Secular Societies, AHS). During the week, AHS societies and similar organisations in Ireland and the UK are encouraged to run charity events. The week has had different themes. Sometimes a charity has been chosen, other times groups have been encouraged to volunteer their time, donate blood and raise money for any cause or issue that they feel is important. So far over 200 Non-Prophet Week events have taken place in around 30 different cities. Over £12,000 has been raised and donated to charity.

== History ==
=== The first Non-Prophet Week ===
The first Non-Prophet Week ran in 2011 during the week 7–13 February. It was coordinated by Nicola Young Jackson, the then Secretary of the AHS. In the first three days alone, £1,400 was raised. The entire week raised £2,358.83 for a huge variety of charities. Each day the activities were written up and societies tweeted about the event using the hash tag #nonprophetweek.

This week societies and groups taking part chose the charity for which they wished to raise money. In order to participate in Non-Prophet Week, an individual must be a member of an AHS associate, a local humanist or secular group, a Skeptics in the Pub group or a group with similar values. The money raised goes to a charity which does not promote atheist or humanist values in Ireland or the UK.

15 member societies, plus BHA Choir, BHA staff took part in the week. £2,221.80 has been raised, (including €50 converted to £41.90), 5 pints of blood were donated, four bags of stuff were donated and 27.5 man hours were spent planting trees.

The Aston Humanist Society raised the most money –£700– and was recognised by A. C. Grayling for their efforts.

The following charities benefited from the week: Book Aid International, Amnesty International, East African Playgrounds, Water Aid, Médecins Sans Frontières, Volunteers for Educational Support and Learning, One World Action, Childreach International, NSPCC, Sense about Science, Tayside Children with Cancer and Leukaemia, Barnardo's charity shop, Council of Ex-Muslims of Britain, Cork College Student Hardship Fund, the Hope Foundation and Horgan's Buildings Senior Citizens Centre.

The societies that took part are: Aston Humanist Society, Birmingham Atheist Society, Bradford Atheist and Humanist Society, Chichester Atheist, Humanist and Agnostic Society, University College Cork Atheist Society, Dundee University Atheist Society, Durham University Humanist and Secular Society, University of Edinburgh Humanist Society, Leeds Atheist Society, LSESU Atheist and Humanist Society, QMUL Atheism Society, Reading University Atheist, Humanist and Secular Society, Southampton Atheist Society, UAL Atheist, Skeptical Society, and UCL Atheist, Secularist and Humanist Society.

=== The second Non-Prophet Week ===
This took place on 7–13 November 2011. The time of year was changed due to feedback from student societies finding February being too busy. Children in Need was chosen as the recommended charity. Nicola Young Jackson coordinated the week whilst back-packing in East Africa and £2,879.04 was raised. This year the British Humanist Association sponsored T-shirts for individuals and groups participating in the week.

The societies and groups that took part were: BHA choir, University of Birmingham Atheist, Secular and Humanist Society, Bradford Atheist and Humanist Society, University of Bristol Atheist, Agnostic and Secular, Cambridge University Atheist and Agnostic Society, Freekthinkers of Leceister; Atheists, Secularists and Humanists, Leeds Atheist Society, Oxford Atheists, Secularists and Humanists, Reading University Atheist, Humanist and Secularist Society, University of Southampton Atheist Society, University of Surrey Skeptic & Atheist Society, and UCL Atheist, Secularist and Humanist Society.

=== The third Non-Prophet Week ===
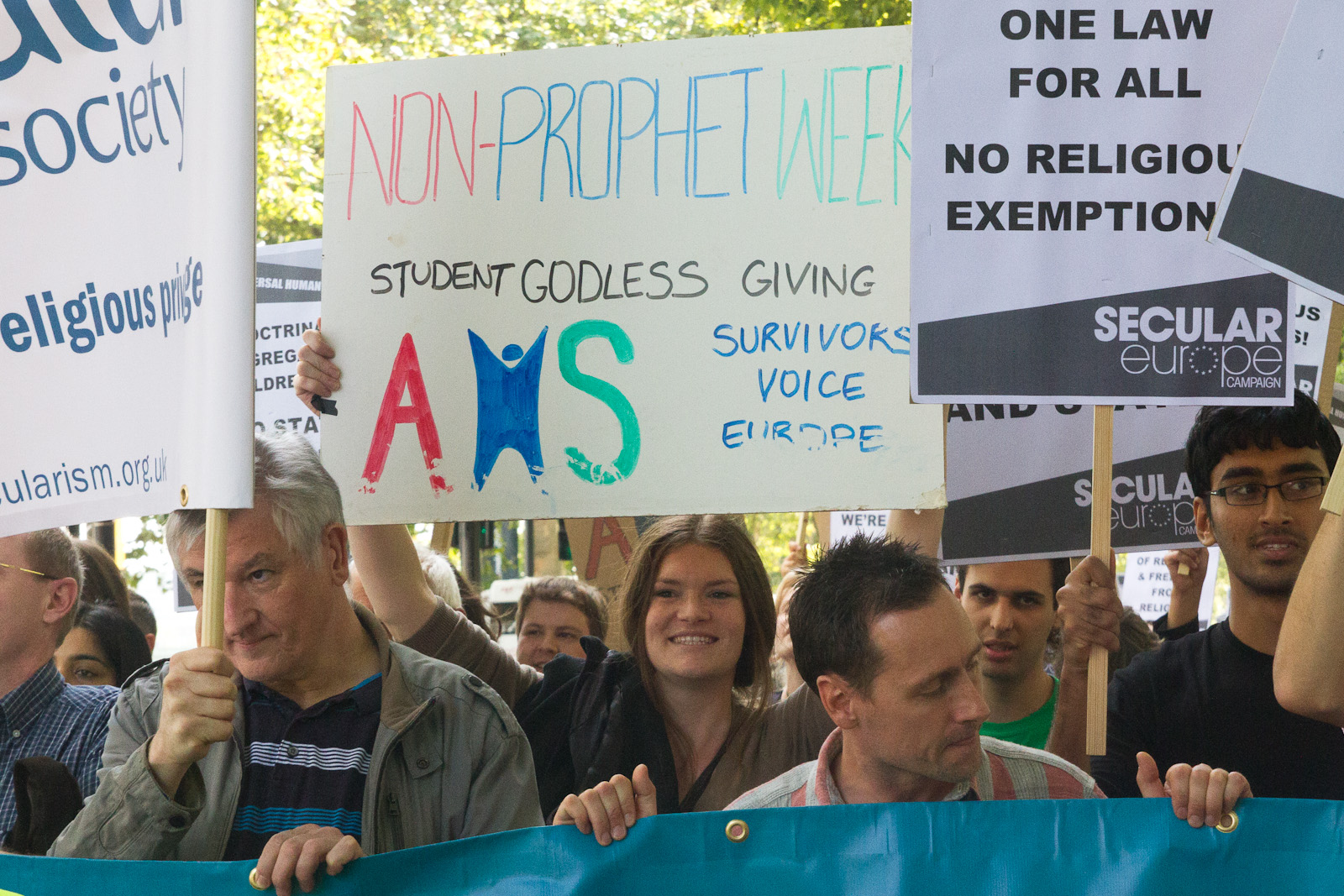
Nicola Young Jackson represented the Non-Prophet Week and the AHS at the 2012 Secular Europe March in London.

This took place on 29 October to 4 November 2012. It was the second year that the British Humanist Association sponsored T-shirts for participants. The week was coordinated by Nicola Young Jackson.

=== The fourth Non-Prophet Week ===
This took place from 28 October to 3 November 2013. It was coordinated by the National Federation of Atheist Humanist and Secular Student Societies then President Rory Fenton. All money raised went to Against Malaria Foundation.

=== The fifth Non-Prophet Week ===
The week was 20–26 October 2014. This year it was decided they would focus on raising money for the Uganda Humanist Schools Trust (UHST). Martin Smith, then AHS Secretary, coordinated the week and it raised £2,794.60. Activities included, among other things, a solo static line parachute jump, sponsored cycle rides and walks and the money has rolled in over the weeks that followed.

Martin Smith, who Coordinated the week said: "We decided to support UHST because they symbolise the practical aspect of Humanism and represent an excellent cause that sends a clear message to the student community of just how committed AHS is to the practical expression of Humanist values. We liked the fact that Uganda Humanist Schools Trust helps a number of schools in Uganda to provide a liberal secular education to needy children irrespective of race or faith. An education is something we are all fortunate enough to have. We were born into a country that could supply that education, in some cases pay for that education too. We are all humanists, and I absolutely believe that being a humanist means taking an active part in improving the lives of our fellow humans across the world. Humanism is after all, ‘for the one life we have. It has been a pleasure and a privilege to organize a fundraising effort for a cause that touches the hearts of so many people, as is clearly demonstrated."

=== The sixth Non-Prophet Week ===
It will be part of the International Humanist and Ethical Youth Organisation's (IHEYO) International Humanist Charity Week, Better Tomorrow. 9–15 November 2015. The President of IHEYO, Nicola Young Jackson had founded the week. The chosen charity with Give Directly. It was promoted by One Law for All website and Humanist Life

== External support ==
Although the week was arranged by The National Federation of Atheist, Humanist and Secular Student Societies (The AHS), it had support from the British Humanist Association, National Secular Society and the International Humanist and Ethical Union.

All the above organisations have advertised the event in their newsletters and on their websites.

== Media coverage ==
The Charity Week has featured in many Humanist and secular websites, particularly based in the UK. It is often used as an example of Humanists doing charity work. At 4.18 pm, 25 July 2013 it was mentioned in the House of Lords by Lord Ahmad of Wimbledon, now Baron Ahmad of Wimbledon, as an example of public service by atheists and humanists:

"Noble Lords have furnished many examples of public service by atheists and humanists, historically and in the present day. I have a couple of my own. The National Federation of Atheist, Humanist and Secular Student Societies has a non-profit week, an annual event, during which it harnesses the enthusiasm and commitment of students to raise money for charities such as Children in Need, Amnesty International and Médecins Sans Frontières. Day in, day out, as the noble Lord, Lord Harrison, mentioned, there is the silent service of humanist chaplains providing pastoral support to non-religious people in hospitals, prisons and universities alongside our religious chaplains. This work is essential to ensure that non-religious people and those of no faith, and humanists and atheists, can get the support that they need in times of difficulty.

The first Non-Prophet Week appeared in Secular News Daily, and Humanist Life.

The second Non-Prophet Week was publicised in an episode of The Pod Delusion podcast.

== Blogs ==
In 2011 Stephen Law encouraged people to support Non-Prophet Week.

In 2013 Maryam Namazie shared information about the week on her blog. Patheos encouraged people to get in involved.

In 2015 Kate Smurthwaite wrote about the show she was doing for Non-Prophet Week.

Groups that take part in Non-Prophet Week often blog about their events and why they think the week is so important. For example, The University of Aston Humanist Society wrote about their events and the University of Leeds Atheist Society proudly say they take part in the week on Leeds University Union website.

== See also ==
- Irreligion in the United Kingdom
- Irreligion in the Republic of Ireland
