= Young Humanists International =

Secular youth movement

- Formation: 2002; 24 years ago
- Region served: Worldwide
- Website: humanists.international/about/young-humanists-international/

Young Humanists International, known as the International Humanist and Ethical Youth Organisation (IHEYO) from 2002 to 2019, is the youth wing of Humanists International (known as the International Humanist and Ethical Union from 1952 to 2019), founded in 2002. It aims to network young humanists around the world together, support training and promote humanist values for the age category of 18–35. It is an umbrella organisation representing around 40,000 young people across the world.

== Purpose ==
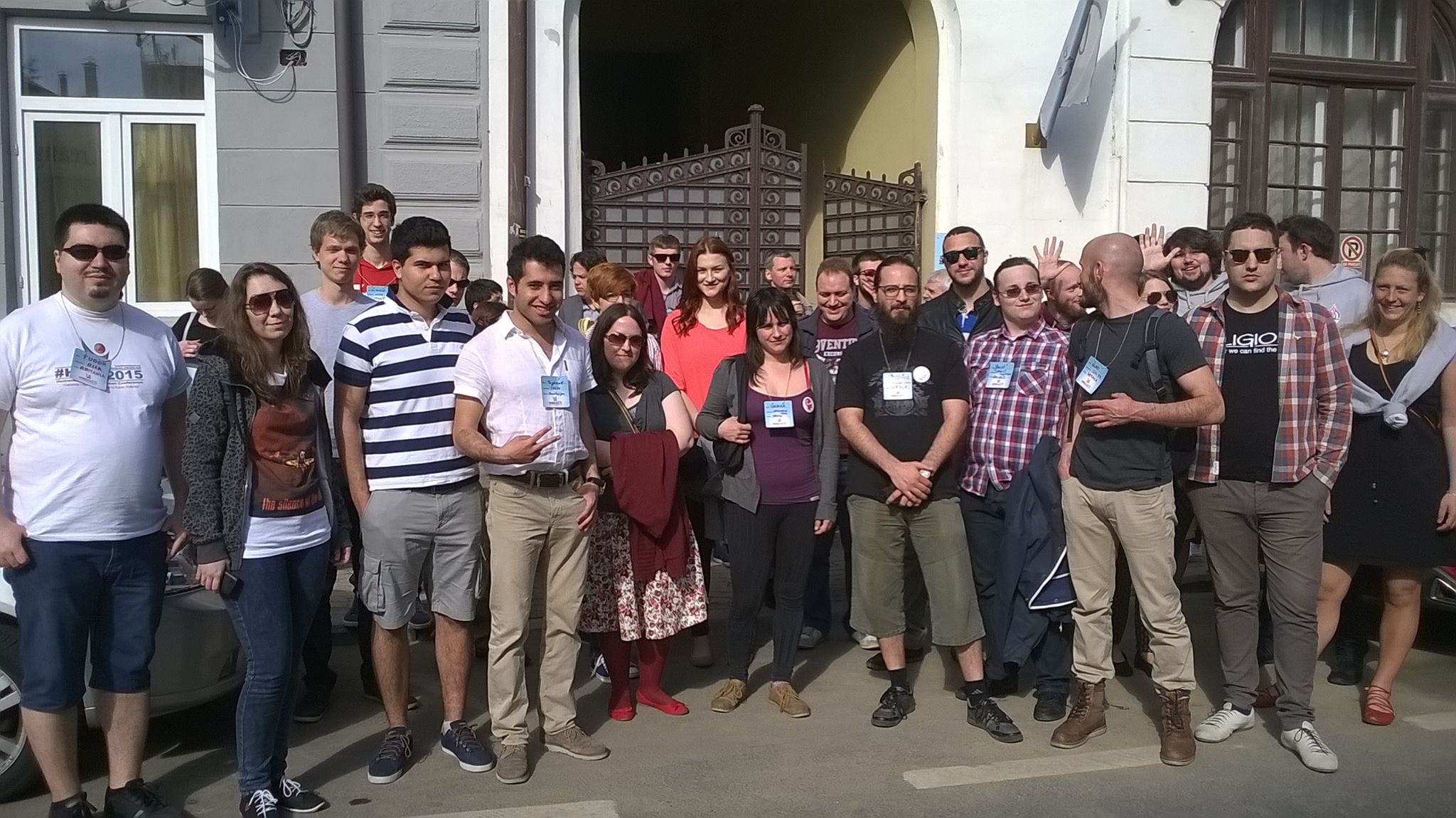
East European Conference in Bucharest, Romania, in 2015

Young Humanists International is the international umbrella organisation for Humanist youth organisations. Its primary mission is to bring into active association youth groups and young humanist individuals throughout the world interested in promoting humanism, as is described in the IHEU Amsterdam Declaration 2002. Young Humanists International brings together people aged 18–35 who describe themselves as humanists, atheists, agnostics, freethinkers, skeptics and similar views.

The vision of Young Humanists International is to give a voice to young humanists within the mission of Humanists International. The mission of Humanists International is to build and represent the global humanist movement that defends human rights and promotes humanist values worldwide. It does this by organising international networking events, offering training, connecting youth through social media and by its work in regional working groups. These activities empower its members to achieve their individual, local and regional goals.

Young Humanists International members form the young humanist communities and campaign for political and cultural change in a diverse range of areas such as religious freedom, women's rights, education rights, abortion rights, LGBTIQ rights, equality, human rights, freedom of speech/thought/belief, public communication of science.

== History ==
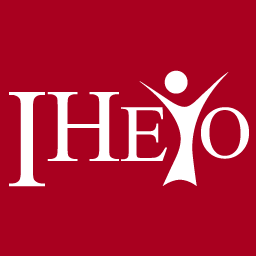
IHEYO logo, 2002–2019

Young Humanists International was formally established as the International Humanist and Ethical Youth Organisation (IHEYO) in 2003, but it was not completely a 21st-century construct. The first version of the organisation was launched in 1966, and lasted around ten years. In the 1980s, it was again revived for a similar period of time. But it was not until 2001, when Humanists International (then known as the International Humanist and Ethical Union) started an internship programme that the idea of re-establishing an international humanist youth network was revived in a lasting way. IHEYO was renamed Young Humanists International on 15 February 2019.

== Membership ==
| Name | Group | Country |
|---|---|---|
| Atheist Centre | Asia | (India) |
| Aware Girls | Asia | (Pakistan) |
| Humanists UK (represented by Young Humanists and Humanist Students) | Europe | (United Kingdom) |
| Junge Humanistinnen & Humanisten in Deutschland | Europe | (Germany) |
| Humanist Alliance of the Philippines, International | Asia | (Philippines) |
| Humanist Association for Leadership, Equity and Accountability | Africa | (Uganda) |
| Humanist Empowerment of Livelihoods in Uganda | Africa | (Uganda) |
| Humanistische Jongeren (Hujo) | Europe | (Belgium) |
| Humanistischer Freidenkerbund Havelland/Brandenburg | Europe | (Germany) |
| Humanistisk Ungdom | Europe | (Norway) |
| Humanist Society (Singapore) | Asia | (Singapore) |
| Jong HV | Europe | (Netherlands) |
| Nigerian Humanist Students Society | Africa | (Nigeria) |
| Norwegian Humanist Association | Europe | (Norway) |
| Polish Humanist Association | Europe | (Poland) |
| Polish Rationalists Society | Europe | (Poland) |
| Social Development Foundation | Asia | (India) |
| Society for Humanism Youth | Asia | (Nepal) |
| Swedish Humanist Association | Europe | (Sweden) |
| Unie Vrijzinnige Verenigingen | Europe | (Belgium) |
| Youth for Community Academic and Development Services | Africa | (Liberia) |

As IHEYO, the organisation kept a separate membership list from its parent organisation, the International Humanist and Ethical Union. At the 2017 general assembly in Malta, the organisation voted to merge its membership list with the parent organisation as part of the relaunched Humanists International and Young Humanists International.

It is customary for organisations with youth sections to have those sections represented as voting delegates at Young Humanists International meetings. For example, the Belgian humanist group DeMens.nu is represented by Humanistische Jongeren; the American Ethical Union is represented in the form of its Future Ethical of Societies wing; and the British group Humanists UK is represented by Young Humanists (UK) and Humanist Students.

== Structure ==
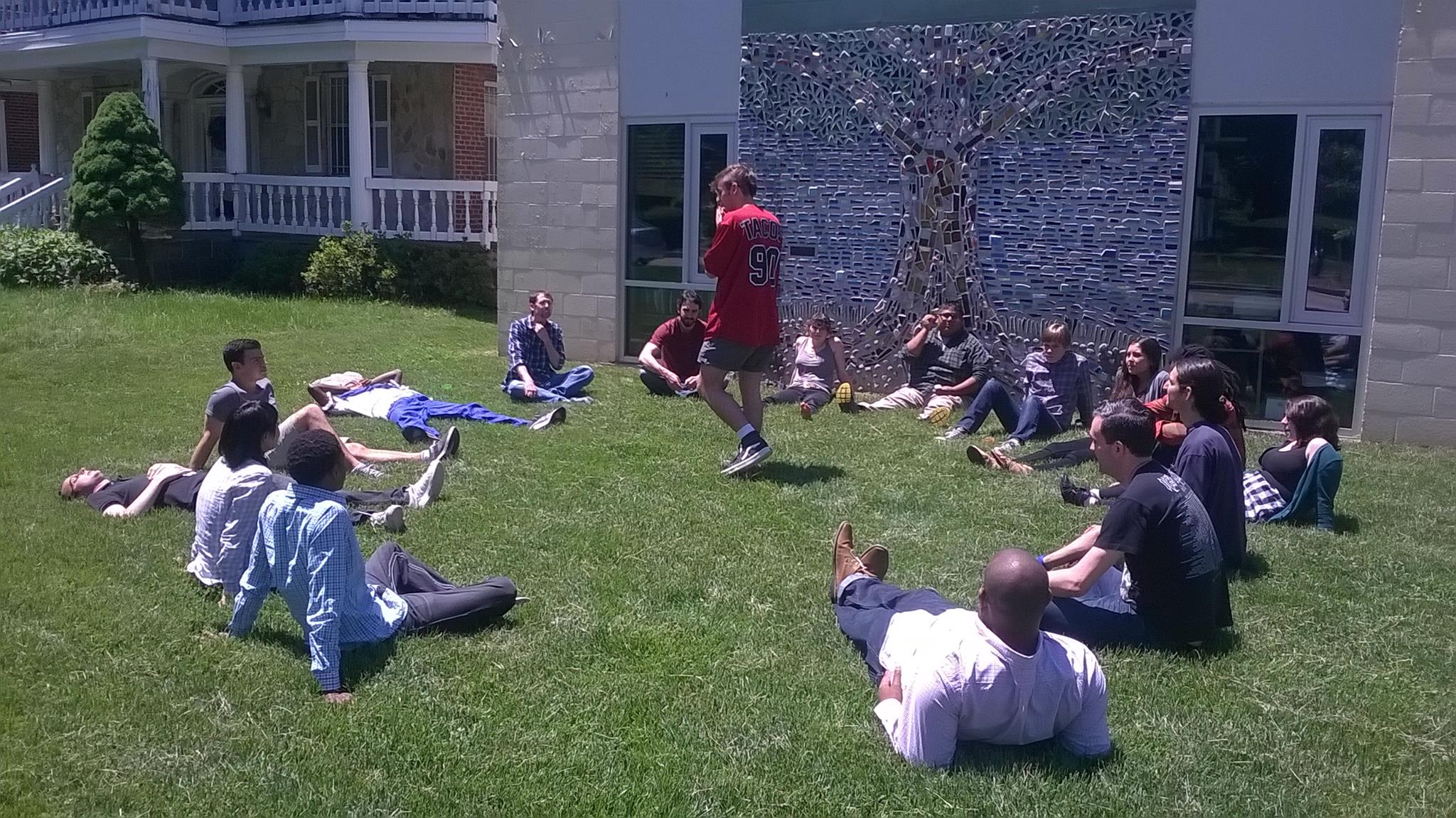
Americas WG launch event in Washington, DC, 2015

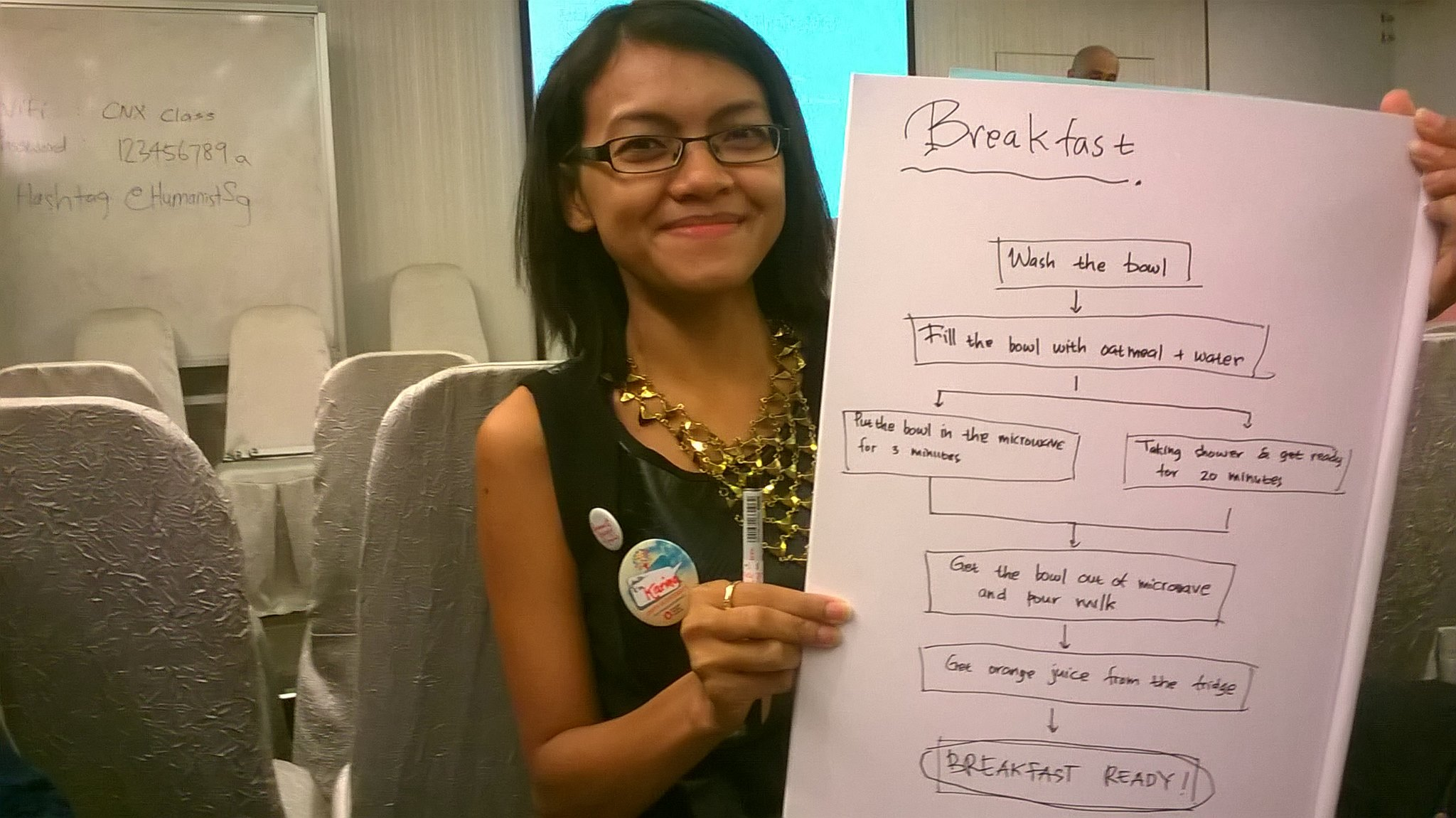
Asian WG training in Singapore, 2015.

Young Humanists International is organised into regional "working groups", which act as forums through which youth-led humanist organisations can cooperate and coordinate their activities. There are four Working Groups: the Asian Humanist Alliance, African Working Group, European Working Group, and an Americas Working Group.

=== African Working Group ===
The African Working Group was established around 2005. It organises regional meetings in East and West Africa. The African Working Group is mainly organised in East Africa (Uganda, Tanzania, Kenya, Rwanda, etc.) and West Africa (Nigeria, Ghana, Liberia, Cameroon, etc.). The Fourth Annual IHEYO East African Regional Working Group Meeting was held in Kigali on 26–28 August 2015.

=== Americas Working Group ===
The American Working group is the newest and launched in Washington DC in May 2015 at the Future of Ethical Societies Annual conference. This working group covers Canada, the United States of America, Central America, and South America.

=== Asian Humanist Alliance (Asian Working Group) ===
The Asian Working Group is a joint humanist effort in this continent to foster humanist values and ideas. Since its inception in 2007, it has published information −bulletins, has had regular meetings and organised events. The Working Group has members in Pakistan, India, Nepal, Bangladesh, Sri Lanka, Malaysia, Indonesia, Singapore and the Philippines.

=== European Working Group ===
The European Working group brings together member organisations in Europe. Humanist groups in Western Europe are typically among the strongest and best-developed in the world, and Working Group participation is often led by dedicated youth sections of European humanist organisations. The Working Group organises annual in-person meetings to coordinate the international exchanges taking place at events organised in Europe, including conferences it organises such as "European Humanist Youth Days".

== Events ==
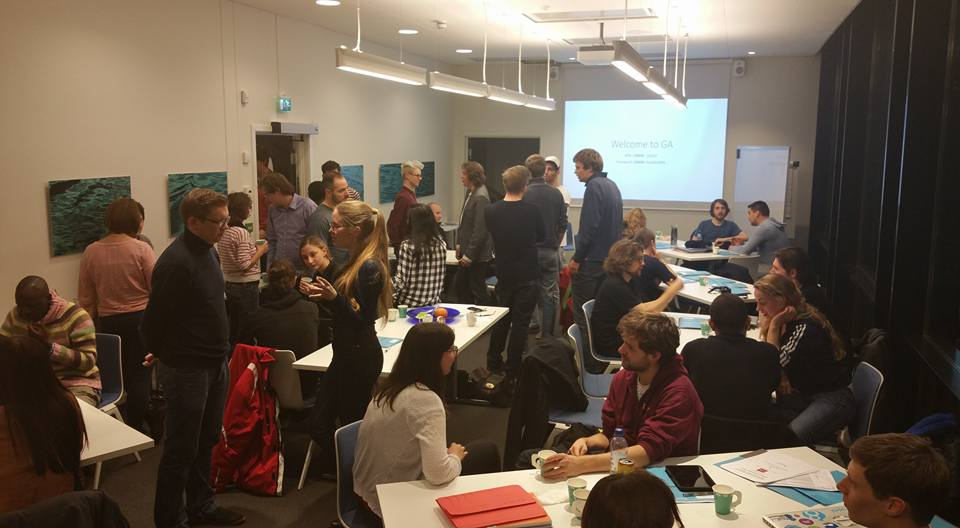
IHEYO General Assembly

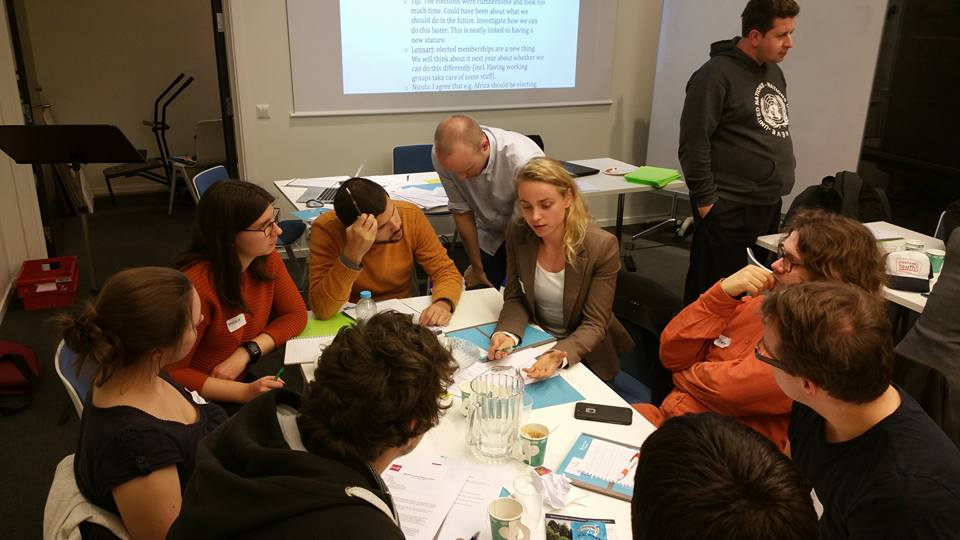
in Oslo, Norway 2015

- 21–23 June 2013: Asia Humanism Conference: Breaking Barriers in the Philippines
- 2–5 August 2013: European Humanist Youth Days in Brussels, Belgium
- October/November? 2013: African Regional Humanist Meeting in Uganda
- 14-18 April 2014 Asian Working Group Meeting in Nepal
- 24–26 April 2015: Humanist East European Conference in Bucharest, Romania
- 7–11 August 2015: Summer Weekend in Esbeek, Netherlands
- 31 October–1 November 2015: IHEYO General Assembly in Oslo, Norway
- 18 - 20 March 2016: (Centre d’Action laïque) Brussels, Belgium
- 21 May: IHEYO General Assembly in Malta
- 29 - 31 July 2016: European Humanist Youth Days in Utrecht, Netherlands

=== Better Tomorrow ===
Better Tomorrow is IHEYO's annual charity event. Its concept was based on the British student federation AHS's Non-Prophet Week.

== Presidents ==
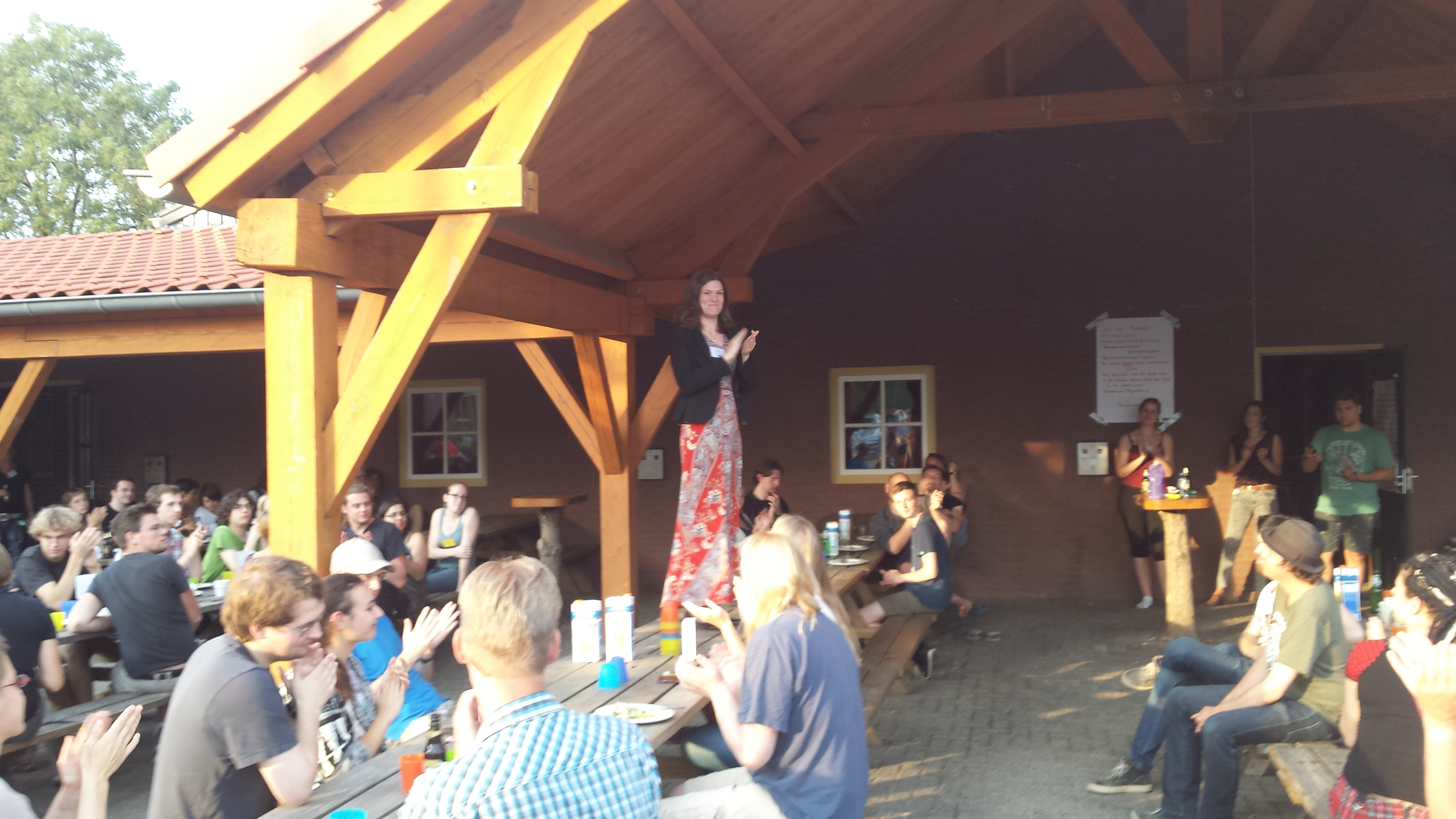
Jackson with European humanists in Esbeek, Netherlands, in 2015

- 2002–2005: Gea Meijers
- 2006–June 2008: Lars-Petter Helgestad (ad interim)
- June–November 2008: Uttam Niraula (ad interim)
- 2008–2014: Silvana Uhlrich
- August 2014–May 2016: Nicola Young Jackson
- May 2016–present: Marieke Prien
