= Women Media Center =

Women Media Center Pakistan
- Founder: Fauzia Shaheen
- Type: Non-Profit Organization
- Purpose: Journalism
- Location: Karachi, Pakistan
- Region served: Women in Journalism
- Website: www.wmcpk.org

The Women Media Center (WMC) is a non-profit organization created in 2005 to promote women journalists and women in the media in Pakistan. Based in Karachi, Pakistan, the Center promotes gender equality in Pakistani mass media.

== About ==
WMC was founded by Fauzia Shaheen in 2005, and she continues to serve as its executive director and general secretary. The organization's main objectives are to conduct research, educate women in various professions of the media and to promote creativity and empowerment among Pakistani women writers and journalists.

Women Media Center organizes workshops in Pakistan to improve the skills of women journalists and holds seminars and training workshops.

== Mission ==
The following mission statement is from the Women Media Center Website.

The Women Media Centre's mission is multidimensional;

- To provide professional environment and to increase women's participation in the mainstream media through training, research and education.
- To improve women's status by means of promoting socially conscious programs on television, video and radio to raise awareness.
- To raise awareness of civic issues from perspective of Pakistani women.
- Work with Pakistani Universities, Mass Communication departments on practical platform for aspiring women journalists in the shape of training programs development syllabus and new courses, encompassing technical area of mass communication with the objective to develop women journalist.
- Provide empowerment training, promote media freedom. And to address the entry barriers confronted by women journalists.
- Networking in its own database with institution involved in promoting awareness and media in particular especially in Pakistan and whole South Asia.
- Provide a gateway for the media industry to address the issues like scarcity of women journalists and services.
