= Humanist Students =

- Formation: 2008
- Type: Nonprofit organisation
- Purpose: Supporting atheist, humanist and secular student groups
- Region served: United Kingdom
- President: James Dart
- Website: humanists.uk/students

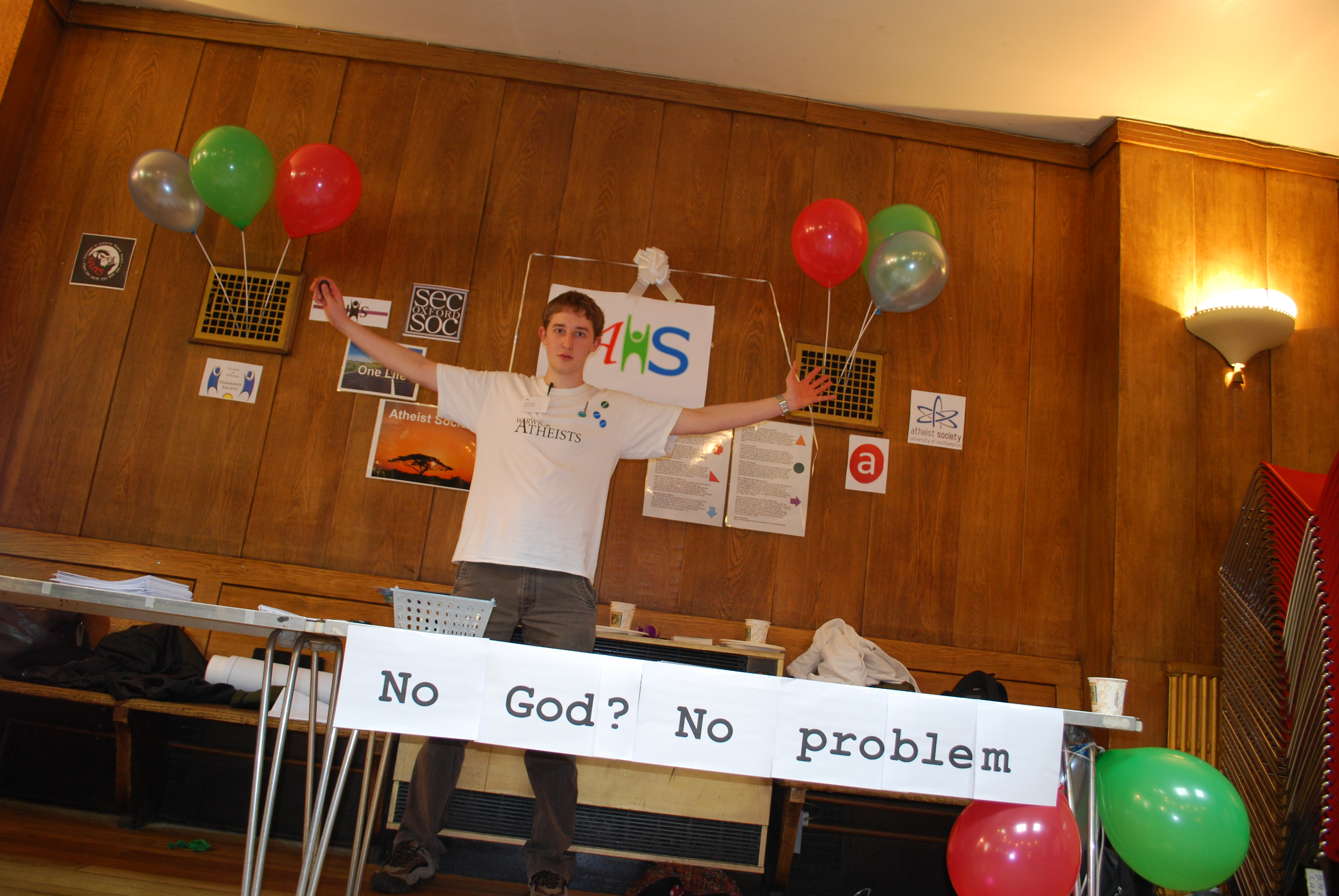
"S is for Secularism" campaign

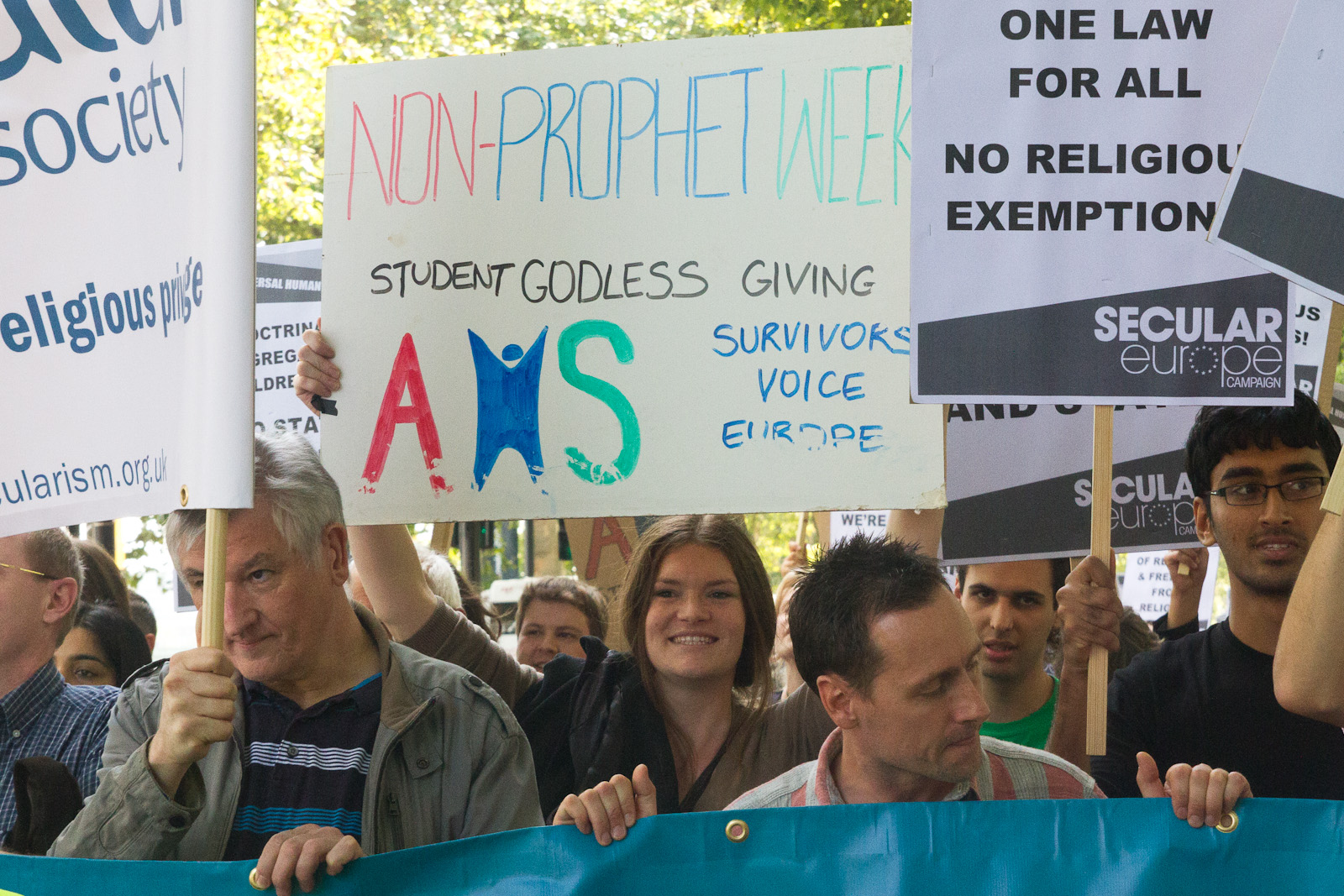
Nicola Young Jackson represented the Non-Prophet Week and the AHS at the 2012 Secular Europe March in London.

Humanist Students is the national umbrella organisation for free-thinking, atheist, humanist and secular student societies in the United Kingdom. Its aim is to provide a national voice for non-religious student societies in the UK and help coordinate national activities.

The group is a membership body composed of student societies in higher education institutes across the UK. In 2012, it became the student section of the Humanists UK (then known as the British Humanist Association), the UK charity which promotes Humanism and secularism in Britain. Until 2017, it was known as the National Federation of Atheist, Humanist, and Secular Student Societies, and later simply Atheist, Humanist, and Secular Students (AHS). In 2017, member societies voted to rename the AHS 'Humanist Students', as well as introducing new structural changes, such as the direct election of the President of Humanist Students by the members of individual societies each year.

Through Humanists UK, the organisation is represented internationally as part of Young Humanists International, the youth wing of Humanists International.

== Aims and objectives ==
As 'The AHS', Humanist Students was set up to support both established and newly forming atheist, humanist and secular student groups and give voice which could be heard nationally. It hoped to achieve this by providing a network, resources and a joint platform for these societies through which they could make their needs and views known on both a national and international level.

== Organisational structure ==
The AHS is run by a committee composed of representatives from each society, namely the president and an elected representative. From the committee the executive, composed of a president, secretary, membership officer, and treasurer, are then elected to form the core leadership body of the organisation.

There is also a sovereign decision-making body within the AHS called the "Caucus". This consists of two representatives from each member society, the executive and the board. They are responsible for electing the executive to manage the organisation on their behalf, determining and directing major policy choices and ratifying applications for membership.

It is one of several sections of Humanists UK, alongside others such as Young Humanists (for 18-35s), LGBT Humanists UK (an LGBT section), and Defence Humanists (for military personnel).

== See also ==
- Secular Student Alliance (USA)
