= Women's Global Network for Reproductive Rights =

Non-governmental organization

Women's Global Network for Reproductive Rights (WGNRR)
- Founded: 1984
- Type: Non-Governmental Organization
- Purpose: Sexual and reproductive health and rights
- Location: Manila, Philippines
- Website: wgnrr.org

Women's Global Network for Reproductive Rights (WGNRR) is an international non-governmental organization (NGO) that advocates for its understanding of women's sexual and reproductive health and rights worldwide. Based in the Global South, it is a membership-driven organization that "works within the rights, justice and feminist frameworks." WGNRR has consultative status with ECOSOC.

== History ==
WGNRR was founded at the fourth International Women and Health Meeting in 1984. The conference was themed "No to Population Control... Women Decide!" and saw the formation of other important international networks including Women Living Under Muslim Laws (WLUML) and Latin American Women and Health Network. In 1987, at another IWHM conference, WGNRR partnered with the Latin America and Caribbean Women's Health Network to launch a campaign addressing maternal mortality and declared May 28 the International Day of Action for Women's Health.

WGNRR was an active participant in the International Conference "Reinforcing Reproductive Rights", held in Madras, India, in 1993. It was this year that WGNRR began campaigning for safe and legal abortion. WGNRR's position on abortion was critical during the International Conference on Population and Development (ICPD) in 1994. According to their website, "WGNRR was part of a coalition – the Women’s Alliance – to ensure that women’s voices were heard and represented at the conference. that protested the population control theories that abounded at the time. WGNRR was also involved in workshops protesting the use of anti-fertility "vaccines". WGNRR's support of the ICPD's inclusion of right to access of safe abortion was still tempered by its concern over the language and the fear of the misuse of such a document by proponents of coerced population control."

In 1995, WGNRR undertook campaigns to address the feminisation of poverty and was an active participant in the development of the Programme of Action for the Women’s World Conference in Beijing. Following the Cairo Consensus, WGNRR held a 1996 Regional Members' Meeting in Amsterdam. Between 2003 and 2007, WGNRR collaborated with the People’s Health Movement on the Women’s Access to Health campaign. WGNRR then relocated its main office to the Global South and by 2009, the main office was transferred from the Netherlands to the Philippines.

== Key areas ==
- Access to safe and legal abortion
- Access to contraceptives
- abortion rights advocacy
- Youth sexual and reproductive health rights
- Women's sexual and reproductive health rights
- Sexual rights for all people

== Campaigns ==
WGNRR has facilitated several international campaigns on a wide range of issues including maternal mortality and morbidity, poverty, forced sterilization and the sexual and reproductive rights of youth. Since its inception, WGNRR has used "Calls for Action" to mobilize members. WGNRR's two primary campaigns are the International Day of Action for Women's Health (May 28) and the International Day of Action for Access to Safe and Legal Abortion (September 28).

=== Global Day of Action for Access to Safe and Legal Abortion ===
September 28 was chosen as the date for the Latin American and Caribbean Campaign for the Decriminalization of Abortion in 1990. In 2015, the name of the day was changed to International Safe Abortion Day in an attempt to have a simpler, easier to remember name and to advocate for the day to become an official UN day.

=== International Day of Action for Women's Health ===
In 1987, during a convene of the members of Women's Global Network for Reproductive Rights (WGNRR), 28 May was declared as International Day of Action for Women's Health.

== Funders ==
WGNRR works in partnership with and has received recent funding from Oxfam Novib and The Safe Abortion Action Fund (SAAF).
