= Fondation Chirac =

French philanthropic organization

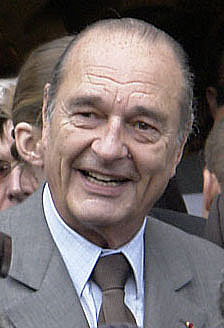

The Fondation Chirac is a French philanthropic organisation launched by former French President Jacques Chirac, after having served two terms in office between 1995 and 2007. Since 2008, this foundation strives for peace through five advocacy programmes:

- conflict prevention
- access to water and sanitation
- access to quality medicines and healthcare
- access to land resources
- and preservation of cultural diversity

It supports field projects involving local people with innovative solutions. The Fondation Chirac has also awarded the Prize for Conflict Prevention every year since 2009.

The foundation's stated priorities include combating falsified medicines, deforestation and desertification, and helping to preserve endangered languages and cultures. The "Sorosoro programme" took its name from an Araki word for "breath, speech, language". The endangered Araki language, in Vanuatu, was spoken by then by only eight people, and the programme's stated objective was to "participate actively in the struggle for the preservation and revitalisation of these endangered languages".

The foundation was directed from its creation until 2013 by Catherine Joubert. Facing difficulties, the foundation must in 2012 leave its premises on rue d'Anjou and thank the staff, except Marc-Antoine Jasson, currently the only employee. At the same time, Claude Chirac and Alain Juppé joined the board of directors.

== History ==
The Foundation was officially launched on June 9, 2008, at the Quai Branly Museum in Paris, with the attendance of most of its Honour Committee's members, such as:

- Kofi Annan, former UN Secretary-General and Nobel Peace Prize.
- Andrés Pastrana Arango, former President of Colombia.
- Abdou Diouf, former President of Senegal.
- Ely Ould Mohamed Vall, former President of Mauritania.
- Rajendra Kumar Pachauri, former chair of the Intergovernmental Panel on Climate Change.
- Rigoberta Menchú Tum, Guatemalan Nobel Peace Prize.
- Youssou N'Dour, artist, Minister of Tourism and Culture of Senegal.
