= Jogezai =

Tribe in Pakistan

Jogezai (Pashto: جوګيزئ‌, Urdu: جوگیزئی; also spelled Jogizai) is a Pashtun lineage of the Sanzarkhel branch of the Kakar tribe, with historical roots in the Zhob Valley and surrounding areas of Balochistan, particularly Killa Saifullah and Loralai. For generations, the family held considerable influence in the region, where chiefly leadership was closely tied to tribal relationships, religious standing, and local traditions. The 1907 Zhob District Gazetteer traces the lineage to an ancestor named Jogi and identifies two principal family branches, the Ishak Kahol, residing in Killa Saifullah, and Nawab Kahol (residing in Loralai and Zabul), descended from the sons of Mukam.

The family's recorded political history reaches back to the eighteenth century. According to the gazetteer, Ahmad Shah Durrani granted Bekar Nika, a descendant of Jogi, a sanad (royal charter) recognizing him as ruler of Zhob. In the nineteenth century, the Jogezais became closely involved in the struggles surrounding British expansion into the region. Shah Jahan Jogezai, one of the family's most influential chiefs, resisted British advances during the Second Anglo-Afghan War and the years that followed. The British expedition into Zhob in 1884 marked a turning point, bringing military confrontation, changes in chiefly authority, and eventually political settlements between different Jogezai leaders and the colonial administration.

The family's involvement in public affairs continued after the establishment of Pakistan in 1947, although its members followed different political paths. Nawab Mohammad Khan Jogezai represented Balochistan in Pakistan's first Constituent Assembly, while later generations entered provincial and national politics, the civil service, and other public institutions. Among them were Dr. Nasiruddin Jogezai, a physician and senator who served as federal Minister of Health and Social Welfare from 1981 to 1984, and Sardar Gul Muhammad Jogezai, who served as Governor of Balochistan from 1991 to 1993.

== Historical genealogy and family branches ==
=== Ancestral genealogy ===
The Baluchistan District Gazetteer Series documents the Jogezai lineage in the Zhob District Gazetteer published in 1907. The gazetteer references an earlier genealogical chart prepared in 1901 by Mir Shams Shah who was Settlement Extra Assistant Commissioner in Baluchistan. According to the gazetteer's genealogy, the wider Kakar tribe traces its descent to Kak Nikka, son of Dani. Within this lineage, the Sanzar Khel trace their ancestry to Sanzar who was the son of Sughrak and grandson of Kak Nikka.

The same source identifies Jogi as the progenitor of the Jogezais, eleven generations below Sanzar, and names his two sons as Bostan and Mitha. It mentions Bekar Nika as a great-grandson of Bostan. Bekar's son Mukam had two sons, Ishak and Nawab, whose descendants became known as the Ishak Kahol and Nawab Kahol. These relationships form the ancestral framework recorded in the early twentieth-century gazetteer.

== Historical and Political Leadership ==
=== Early Tribal Leadership and Durrani Period ===
The Jogezais' traditional centres of influence included territories now forming parts of northern Balochistanand southeast Afghanistan. Traditional accounts discuss the lineage as holding religious prestige and hereditary chiefly authority among the Kakars. The 1907 Zhob District Gazetteer recounts traditions about Jogi and his descendants and specifies shrines associated with both Jogi and Bekar Nika at Spin Tangi. These accounts reflect the religious standing associated with the lineage, although the gazetteer does not establish when Jogi lived or provide a detailed account of his life.

Jogezai authority was associated with several sources: claims of descent, religious reputation and control of resources. Colonial records also record economic privileges held by members of the leading family branches. The 1907 gazetteer records revenue free lands, exemptions from cattle tax, grain allowances and payments for levy service among prominent members. These arrangements changed in nature and scope over time.

==== Baikar Nika and Ahmad Shah Durrani ====
Baikar Nika or Bakar Khan Jogezai is among the earliest figures in the Jogezai genealogy linked to an identifiable historical ruler. The 1907 gazetteer describes him as a descendant of Jogi and a leading member of the family in the eighteenth century. It records that Ahmad Shah Durrani, founder of the Durrani Empire, granted Bekar a sanad in the mid-eighteenth century and recognized him as "Badshah or Ruler of Zhob,” and presented him with a gold turban ornament as a mark of chiefly recognition.

The gazetteer records a tradition about Bekar Nika's relationship with Ahmad Shah Durrani. According to the account, Bekar was called to Kandahar over questions about revenue collection and subjected to an ordeal involving boiling water. He reportedly emerged unharmed and that prompted the Afghan ruler to recognize his religious standing and exempt him from certain revenue obligations.

A related reference appears in Aziz Ullah’s 2020 study, Marital Networks and Political Alliances in Baluchistan, Pakistan. Drawing on local accounts, Ullah writes that Bekar Nika joined Ahmad Shah Durrani on an expedition into India, bringing around 300 men from Zhob.. The account doesn't identify specific battle. According to the tradition, Bekar later received the title Naib-e-Kakaristan and a ceremonial crown, which came to symbolize chiefly legitimacy. The gazetteer also notes a shrine associated with Bekar Nika at Spin Tangi.

==== Formation of Ishak Kahol and Nawab Kahol ====
Historical genealogies identify Mukam, son of Bekar Nika, as the father of Ishak and Nawab. Their descendants became known as the Ishak Kahol (living in Killa Saifullah) and Nawab Kahol (living in Loralai and Zabul), respectively. The word kahol means extended family or descent group, and the distinction between the two branches was originally genealogical: each traced its ancestry to one of two brothers in the same lineage. The 1907 gazetteer names Shah Jahan as a member of the Nawab Kahol and Dost Muhammad, Shahbaz Khan, and Bangul Khan as leaders of the Ishak branch.

By the nineteenth century, prominent members of the lineage were competing over succession, seniority, resources, and political influence. Historical accounts suggest that tensions between leading households predated the major British military expedition of 1884. British colonial involvement later reshaped these relationships through the recognition of certain chiefs, political settlements, government allowances, and the allocation of administrative privileges.

=== Resistance to British Expansion ===
==== Shah Jahan Jogezai and British Expansion ====
Shah Jahan Jogezai, son of Nawab and a leading figure in the Nawab Kahol branch, became one of the most influential chiefs in the Zhob region during the nineteenth century. Frontier and Overseas Expeditions from India describes him as among the most influential members of the family. His character and reputation as a fakir and miracle worker helped him secure authority over the many sections of the Sanzar Khel Kakars. He also extended his influence among the Sanatia Kakar tribes, including the Sarangzais and Panezais, whose support he could rely on in pursuing his policies.

From 1878 to 1884, his authority extended across Zhob, Bori [Loralai], and the adjoining areas of Kach and Kowas. His influence reached beyond his immediate family to other Kakar tribes, thanks in part to his reputation as a religious figure.

== Nawab of Jogezai ==
The first Nawab from the Jogezai clan was Shaheed Nawab Bangul Khan Jogezai, who was first awarded the title of Sardar Bahadur in 1897 and later on, was granted the title of Nawab in 1906. After dying in 1906, Nawab Bangul Khan was succeeded by his son, Nawab Mohammad Khan Jogezai. Nawab Mohammad Khan was a close ally of Muhammad Ali Jinnah and rendered great services to the Pakistan Movement and was the head of the Shahi Jirga of Balochistan. He was also a member of the Constituent Assembly of Pakistan from Balochistan (1947-1954). The third Nawab was Nawab Taimoor Shah Jogezai who also remained a member of the Provincial Assembly of Balochistan and was a Provincial Minister. He nominated his eldest grandson Nawab Mohammad Ayaz Jogezai to be his successor while he was still alive and after his death in 1988, Nawab Ayaz took over and is the current head of the family.

== List of Nawabs ==
- Nawab Bangul Khan Jogezai
- Nawab Mohammad Khan Jogezai
- Nawab Taimoor Shah Jogezai
- Nawab Muhammad Ayaz Khan Jogezai

== Notable Personalities ==
Other notable personalities include:

- Nawabzada Jehangir Shah Jogezai, Member of Senate of Pakistan.
- Nawabzada Mehboob Khan Jogezai
- Nawab Ayaz Jogezai
- Sardar Wazir Ahmed Jogezai, Deputy Speaker of National Assembly of Pakistan.
- Nawabzada Hamayun Jogezai, War Hero during Pakistan and India conflict, and former DIG.
- Sardar Gul Muhammad Khan Jogezai, 11th Governor of Balochistan.
- Sardar Muhammad Usman Khan Jogezai, Sardar and member of the Pakistan Movement in Baluchistan
- Dr Nasser uh din Jogezai, Member of Senate of pakistan, Federal minister of health, provincial Minister, Senator, IJI president.
- Dr Ameer Muhammad Jogezai Former provincial minister of health Balochistan
