= Ameer Muhammad Khan Jogezai =

- Born: 1957 (age 68–69); Loralai District, Balochistan
- Relatives: Sardar Gul Mohammad Khan Jogezai (brother)

Ameer Muhammad Khan Jogezai was nominated to become the Governor of Balochistan after the resignation of Muhammad Khan Achakzai. His nomination was consented to by the Prime Minister of Pakistan Imran Khan only to be rescinded later on.

A pediatrician by trade, he later declined the governorship due to investigations into allegations of embezzlement and misappropriation of funds, but then clarified that his statement about declination was misrepresented. He just requested to delay the oath taking until the embezzlement charges were investigated, otherwise he was willing to accept the position.

On 26 August 2018 the prime minister's office rejected the news reports about his appointment as a governor of Balochistan.

== Early life and family ==
Jogezai was born in 1957 in Loralai District, Balochistan. He belongs to the Kakar clan, of whom the Jogezais are a sub-clan.

He is the younger brother of former governor of Balochistan Sardar Gul Mohammad Khan Jogezai.
