= First 100 days of Imran Khan's premiership =

The first 100 days of the Imran Khan premiership began with his oath of office ceremony on 18 August 2018 as the 22nd Prime Minister of Pakistan – shortly after the oath-taking of the 15th National Assembly of Pakistan on 13 August, and the elected parliament's vote of confidence for Khan's premiership on 17 August. The 100th day of his premiership was 25 November 2018.

The first 100 days of his premiership took on symbolic significance after his party had announced a "100-day agenda" months before the 2018 Pakistani general election. According to both government sources and outside observers, this period was considered a benchmark to measure the early success of his government.

== Background ==
Just a few days before the elections were announced, his party unveiled the first 100 days plan for his future government. The plan included the creation of a new province in Southern Punjab, reconciliation with alienated Baloch leaders, development of Karachi, poverty alleviation, and betterment of the economy overall. The plan included a jumbo development package for FATA to which other provinces will contribute three per cent of their share. The newly created province in Southern Punjab would be given complete autonomy, made an agricultural hub, an economic package would be announced, and the young will be provided with job opportunities by setting up a food processing industry. The promise was made to implement the job quota reserved for Balochistan. The federal government would announce a development package for Karachi after the completion of six-point agenda, which includes betterment of law and order, strengthening of local government, operations against extortionists and China cutting mafia, a housing infrastructure plan, setup of a public transport system, and culmination of militant sections of political parties. To improve the overall economy of the country, it was promised that 10 million jobs will be created, the manufacturing sector will be resuscitated, small and medium-sized businesses will be developed fast, and the private sector will be assisted in building five million houses. Reformation of tax administration, increase in tourism, the transformation of state-owned enterprises, and overcoming of the energy challenges was also promised. Improvement of the agriculture sector was promised through increasing profitability and access to finance for farmers. Farmers will also be provided value-added incentives, livestock sector, and produce markets will be improved. National Water Policy will be improved and acted upon. Through this plan, it was promised that national security would be revamped by creation of four national security organizations.

== Inaugural address ==
On 19 August 2018, he addressed the nation formally on television otherwise referred to as his formal inaugural address in which he laid out the basis of his policies and agenda for his government. In that address, he announced many austerity measures which included reduction of PM house employees and bulletproof vehicles, conversion of PM house into a university, conversion of governor houses into public benefit buildings, and criticism on foreign visits of prime minister (which was taken as an indication that he will reduce them). He showed concern about how the nation's children were having stunted growth due to malnutrition while the government is spending an extensive amount of money on its own luxuries. Khan announced that he will not live in Prime Minister House and will cut down the staff of prime minister house from 524 people to 2 people. He also announced that he will only keep two vehicles out of the current 80 vehicles available for use by Prime Minister and the rest will be auctioned. He said he will not own any business while in office so that there is no conflict of interest. He also promised to strengthen the Zakat system. He announced that his government will take measures to increase exports. He also announced that he will be ashamed to ask for monetary help from other nations and rather would adopt austerity measures to get rid of the debt. He announced to strengthen the tax collection system. He requested overseas Pakistani to help Pakistan in this time of great need by keeping money in Pakistani banks and by sending money by banks instead of by illegal means. Explaining the reason to keep interior ministry to himself he said he wanted to keep Federal Investigation Agency directly under himself so he can oversee the efforts to curtail money laundering. He announced to the creation of a task force to bring laundered money back to Pakistan. He offered National Accountability Bureau, the help of the federal government to curtail the corruption. He announced to form a task force to improve government hospitals so poor people of the country can get the same high-quality care as rich who opt to get health care in private hospitals. He also touched upon how Pakistani children are having stunted growth due to malnutrition.

He said there is a crisis of water in major cities and we will work on completing Diamer-Bhasha Dam to combat that crisis and we will help farmers on methods to save water during irrigation. He announced that we will not invite people from other countries to take care of sanitation needs rather we will create our own sanitation system. He gave the example of the state of Medina and how educated prisoners of war were given incentives upon teaching an uneducated person. He also announced to convert PM House into a world-class research university where he would invite scholars from around the world to do research on different subjects. He announced that he will improve the government school system so people do not have to opt for private schools to give quality education to their children. He also said that the madrassah system will be brought at par with the rest of the education system so it can produce quality citizens. On foreign policy, he announced in his inaugural address to the nation that we want peace with all the nations in the world. He announced that his government will create initiatives to plant billions of trees to combat global warming and heatwaves. He announced that we will build parks and playgrounds. He promised to build four tourism sites every year for the development of tourism. He also promised to develop international standard beaches. Khan said that he specifically tasked his human rights ministry to work towards ending sexual abuse towards children. He stressed the creation of a new province in Southern Punjab. Giving an example of Khyber Pakhtunkhwa's former government, he announced that the police system would be reformed in Punjab and Balochistan in a similar manner and they would request the Sindh government to do the same. He said that he would have a meeting with Chief Justice of Pakistan and together they would reform the judicial system so that every case would be decided in less than one year time. He asked civil service to provide services to the common man with respect as they have the right to those services. He announced to create a new local government system and not provide development funds to members of parliament. He addressed the nation formally on television otherwise referred to as his formal inaugural address in which he laid out the basis of his policies and agenda for his government. Khan announced that he will appoint Nasir Durrani as an advisor in Punjab Government so that he can bring same reform in Punjab Police as he did in Khyber Pakhtunkhwa as Inspector General of Khyber Pakhtunkhwa Police.

== Building the team ==
Khan announced most of his team at national and provincial levels before he took oath as prime minister but some of his nominees were confirmed later either by a vote or by mere taking an oath of their concerned office. On 18 August 2018, after taking oath as prime minister of Pakistan, Khan announced his 21-member federal cabinet and their portfolios. He appointed Mohammad Azam Khan as his secretary. The same day, he nominated Arif Alvi for the office of President of Pakistan. On 19 August 2018, His nominee Sardar Usman Buzdar, a political candidate belonging to the rural area of Dera Ghazi Khan, was elected as Punjab Chief Minister despite criticism, mainly due to his less prominent background and allegations of a criminal case against him in 1998. Khan and the PTI justified Buzdar's selection, stating the party conducted background checks and found him to be honest, adding that the previous case against him was politically motivated; according to Khan, Buzdar belonged to an impoverished district with "no water, electricity or hospital" and that he would be "well acquainted with how people live in those areas, and secondly, he is aware of how the poor lead their lives. When he will assume the office of the chief minister he will know the nature of the plight that faces the underprivileged people of Pakistan". On 20 August 2018, His cabinet took the oath of office. Khan appointed former official of NAB Mirza Shehzad Akbar as his special assistant for accountability. The PTI's chief whip, Shireen Mazari, was given the portfolio of human rights ministry.

Khan nominated Ehsan Mani as Pakistan Cricket Board chairman after Najam Sethi resigned. On 22 August 2018, two new special assistance to prime minister were inducted including Iftikhar Durrani on media affairs and Naeemul Haque on political affairs. On 25 August 2018, Khan nominated Ehsan Mani and Asad Ali Khan as members of Board of Governors of Pakistan Cricket Board. He gave his consent to the nomination of Ameer Muhammad Khan Jogezai as Governor of Balochistan. Shibli Faraz was nominated leader of the house for the Senate of Pakistan. Khan approved the appointment of former counsel for Pervez Musharraf, Anwar Mansoor Khan as Attorney General of Pakistan. On 26 August 2018, prime minister's office backtracked on the decision to make Ameer Muhammad Khan Jogezai as governor of Balochistan saying that the name was discussed but never finalized. A 23-member Punjab cabinet and a 15-member Khyber Pakhtunkhwa cabinet was formed with full approval by Khan. On 27 August 2018, Khan appointed finance minister Asad Umar as the boss of forthcoming Economic Coordination Committee. On 28 August 2018, Khan decided to appoint Shehryar Khan Afridi as minister of the state for interior. Same day, Khan also made some appointments in bureaucracy, he appointed Muhammad Suleman Khan as Director General Intelligence Bureau. Jahanzeb Khan was appointed as Chairman of the Federal Board of Revenue. Mehr Khaliq Dad Lak was appointed as Director-General of National Counter Terrorism Authority. On 1 September 2018, Khan formed an 18-member Economic Advisory Council (EAC) to advise on matters of economic policymaking. The council includes financial experts associated with international universities such as Atif Mian from Woodrow Wilson School of Public and International Affairs at Princeton University, Asim Ijaz Khawaja from John F. Kennedy School of Government, and Imran Rasul from University College London.

On 4 September 2018, Pakistan Tehreek-e-Insaf's presidential candidate, Arif Alvi, was elected as the 13th President of Pakistan following the 2018 presidential election scheduled on 4 September. He received 352 votes and defeated opposition candidates Fazal-ur-Rehman and Aitzaz Ahsan who secured 184 and 124 votes, respectively. Polling was held via the Electoral College of Pakistan, which comprised the National Assembly, Senate, and the four provincial assemblies of Punjab, Sindh, Khyber Pakhtunkhwa and Balochistan; all elected members of the respective houses cast secret ballot voting for their preferred candidate. Khan's advisor and legal aide Babar Awan voluntarily tendered his resignation from the ministry of parliamentary affairs, following a corruption case filed against him by the National Accountability Bureau (NAB) over alleged irregularities in the Nandipur Power Project, when Awan had been affiliated with the ruling PPP government from 2008 to 2013 as federal law minister. Explaining his resignation, Awan tweeted: "Rule of law begins with me. Thank you, Insafians for standing by me always. I will never let you down." Information minister Fawad Chaudhry defended Atif Mian's appointment to the Economic Advisory Council, following a vicious smear campaign against the latter on social media targeting him for his Ahmadi faith. Lambasting the controversy, Chaudhry stated: "Pakistan belongs as much to minorities as it does to the majority. I don't think anyone should have objections [to Mian's appointment], and those who do, they are basically extremists and we will not bow to extremists", later tweeting: "...we'll follow [the] principles of Mr Jinnah, not of extremists". Continuing his defense of Atif Mian's appointment in the EAC, Fawad Chaudhry stated: "Protecting minorities is our responsibility. It is the religious duty of each Muslim, not just the government, to protect minorities and respect those that they live with". On 7 September however, it was learnt that the government had relented and asked Atif to step down, who voluntarily offered to commit out of the EAC and would be replaced. According to senator Faisal Javed, the government did not aim to deliberately create social division based on such issues and said the government aimed to "move forward alongside scholars and all social groups, and it is inappropriate if a single nomination creates an impression to the contrary". The development was roundly condemned by critics, especially those belonging to the liberal sections of society. In solidarity with Mian, two overseas-based economists in the EAC, Asim Khwaja and Imran Rasul, announced they were resigning from the committee with a decision which was "painful" and "heavy-hearted" respectively; both wished the new government well, and said they would always be willing to assist Pakistan in their individual capacities. Meanwhile, on 8 September, Fazl-ur-Rehman, leader of the right-wing opposition party JUI-F, castigated the government for appointing Mian and alleged that by selecting an Ahmadi from the West, Khan was actually seeking to "influence our economy with Jewish ways" and on the "dictates of the West". An article on Dawn dated 10 September stated the actual reason behind Mian's removal lay in "internal dissent" from religious parties who had threatened nationwide sit-ins against the appointment, on the same day that Chinese and Saudi dignitaries were to arrive in Islamabad. Sources said the government had been compelled to take the decision to avoid an 'ugly' situation during the foreign dignitaries' visits, as well as due to political pressure and nitpicking by some opposition parties. A PTI member described the situation as "unfortunate" and said some cabinet members felt "depressed" after the EAC lost three of its top thinkers, even while replacement slots were being filled.

On 4 September 2018, Khan's pick for the chairmanship of Pakistan Cricket Board, Ehsan Mani was elected as such by the board. On 5 September 2018, Khan's nomination for governorship of Khyber Pakhtunkhwa, Shah Farman took oath of office.

On 8 September, it was learnt that the PTI's Punjab government had inducted nine more ministers, three extra advisers and five special attendants; the federal government meanwhile announced it was expanding the cabinet and adding four more ministers, who were to take oath on 10 September: Omar Ayub Khan (energy portfolio), Ali Zaidi (maritime affairs portfolio), Muhammad Mian Soomro (privatisation portfolio) and Murad Saeed, whose post was still undetermined. This brought the number of total federal cabinet members to 24. That same day, Mamnoon Hussain completed his tenure in office as President of Pakistan and exited the President House with a guard of honour. He would be succeeded by president-elect Arif Alvi of the PTI, who won the 2018 presidential election days back and was slated to take office on 9 September 2018.

== Economic, anti-corruption, and austerity measures ==
On 20 August 2018, Khan's cabinet minister Shafqat Mahmood made a committee to counsel on forthcoming community consumption of "heritage buildings" which include governor houses around the country among others. Same day, Khan's finance minister Asad Umar said that Khan had ordered him to bring back the laundered money from oversees. Umar also said that workers of Pakistan International Airlines and Pakistan Steel Mills will not be sacked as those people have nothing to do with these organizations being in financial loss. He said that government will sell bonds to expatriate Pakistanis. As part of anti-corruption measures, his cabinet decided to put Nawaz Sharif and Maryam Nawaz on exit control list so they cannot leave the country. The cabinet also issued a directive to bring back Ishaq Dar and sons of former prime minister Nawaz Sharif - Hussain and Hassan - to face justice in pending cases against them. The cabinet also decided to implement the austerity measures announced in Khan's inaugural speech. It was decided that employees released from the prime minister house would be adjusted elsewhere. The cabinet decided that the British government will be contacted for "attachment'" of Avenfield properties so that they can be sold and the derivatives brought back to Pakistan treasury. Khan has instructed his ministers to work fourteen hours per day while he himself will work sixteen hours per day, he also instructed them to not take any holiday for the first three months (a little short of 100 days) including Sundays. The cabinet also decided to discontinue the overseas medical facilities for ministers which are usually funded by the government treasury. It also decided to auction the bulletproof and extravagant vehicles belonging to the prime minister house. The decision was made to avoid unnecessary international tours by government officials including the prime minister, to that effect foreign minister Shah Mehmood Qureshi will attend the annual United Nations General Assembly session in September 2018 instead of Khan. On 21 August 2018, the announcement made by the cabinet regarding putting Nawaz Sharif and Maryam Nawaz on exit control list was acted upon.

Asad Qaiser, Speaker of the National Assembly of Pakistan announced to follow strict austerity measures in parliament. On 21 August 2018, after reviewing a ten year report of Capital Development Authority (CDA), Khan announced that he will act towards ending corruption in CDA, he also issued directive to solve water crisis in Islamabad. Same day, the announcement made by the cabinet on 20 August 2018 regarding putting Nawaz Sharif and Maryam Nawaz on exit control list was acted upon. The cabinet decided to eliminate discretionary funds for members of parliament including ministers and the prime minister but in reality, these funds were already abolished by the previous government of Pakistan Muslim League (N). The cabinet also decided that no announcements of projects of public benefit will be made during public rallies like previous prime ministers used to do. Khan will not use a special plane for international visits and the benefit of travel via first-class has been taken away from ministers, the prime minister, the president, and the chief justice of Pakistan, all will travel via club class. A forensic audit of major mass transport systems in the country will be conducted. Khan instructed Chief Minister of Punjab, Sardar Usman Buzdar to keep the cabinet small. On 24 August, the government launched a probe to audit all metro bus projects initiated by the previous PML-N government, including the established metros in Lahore, Islamabad and Multan, the upcoming Green Line of Karachi, and the Orange Line train of Lahore; the objective was to evaluate the transparency of the projects, the contracts allotted to companies, and the spending of funds. On 27 August 2018, while adopting the austerity measures announced by the prime minister, Chief Minister of Khyber Pakhtunkhwa, Mahmood Khan directed that no tea and no water bottles should be presented to attendees during official meetings. Aleem Khan, the provincial minister and close associate of prime minister announced that he will donate his monthly salary to Shaukat Khanum Memorial Hospital during his tenure as the minister. He also announced that he will not be running his business while he is in government and will only use his personal vehicle for his governmental land travel needs. On 28 August 2018, in a twist about a controversy regarding Khan not following his own announced austerity measures by using a helicopter for his daily travel between prime minister house and his Bani Gala residence, his information minister Fawad Chaudhry explained that the travel by helicopter costs 50 rupees per kilometre. He said that this cost is based on his Google Search about prime minister's travel by helicopter. Chaudhry's claim became a laughing stock on social media. Khan spent the weekdays at the Prime Minister's secretariat, while his weekends were spent at his Bani Gala residence.

On 28 August, finance minister Asad Umar stated that the government was weighing its options, but had not decided yet on whether it would seek a fresh bailout package from the International Monetary Fund (IMF), keeping in view the ongoing economic situation of the country. He informed the Senate that Pakistan had gone to the IMF 12 times previously, and said that the government's real fight was with unemployment and inflation. He also initiated the National Finance Commission Award process with his finance secretary. Khan gave two weeks deadline to the task force which was created to bring the country's stolen wealth from overseas to come up with a plan to fulfil the assigned task. Same day, the cabinet tasked the advisor for austerity to present government reforms within ninety days. On 29 August 2018, the prime minister had a meeting with National Accountability Bureau Chairman during which he ensured government's unflinching support to strengthen the bureau further and praised its performance. The meeting drew criticism due to the conflict of interest as the same bureau was investigating helicopter misuse case against the prime minister and corruption cases against cabinet member Pervez Khattak. On 31 August 2018, Khan's government announced its first reduction in petroleum prices. The price of petrol, high-speed diesel, kerosene oil, and light diesel was reduced by 2.41, 6.37, .46, and .59 rupees accordingly. On 1 September 2018, going ahead with austerity measures announced by Khan, the prime minister house set the date for the auction of a total of 102 luxury vehicles including 27 bullet-proof vehicles. As part of this auction, three 2014 BMW cars, three 2016 5000cc BMW SUVs, two 2016 3000cc BMW SUVs, four 2016 Mercedes-Benz cars (out of which two are 4000cc bullet-proof), one 2004 Toyota Lexus car, one 2006 Toyota Lexus SUV, two 2004 Toyota Land Cruisers, four 2015 bullet-proof Toyota Land Cruisers, one 2013 Honda Civic 1800cc car, two 2013 Suzuki Cultus cars, one 2013 Suzuki APV, one 1994 Hino bus, and 2003 to 2013 model Toyota vehicles will be up for sale on 17 September 2018. On 2 September 2018, following the austerity drive, Chief minister Balochistan vowed to dedicate two chief minister houses being built in Quetta and Urak Valley for public use.

On 2 September, the central government deployed nine senior officers of the civil service to Balochistan on long-term assignments, where they would expedite works being carried out under the China Pakistan Economic Corridor projects. On 3 September 2018, in a top-level meeting, Khan directed government departments to take proactive measures in preventing money laundering and smuggling across the country through unconventional, illegal methods such as hawala and hundi. He reviewed a presentation from the Federal Board of Revenue on losses incurred to the economy as a result of illegal financial transactions. A committee was constituted to make existing financial laws stronger, and propose amendments to these laws where required, the findings of which would be presented in a week. On 4 September 2018, Khan asked the petroleum division to make a plan for stopping the stealing of gas and ordered a 46% increase in natural gas rates as devised by Oil and Gas Regulatory Authority. The decision was criticised particularly due to its impact on gas bills for consumers, but other analysts said it was necessary given the pressure faced by the government over existing subsidies to the gas sector. On 5 September 2018, the cabinet held a meeting, during which it was decided that efforts would be made to recover money illegally stashed abroad by Pakistanis, mainly due to corruption. Khan was in the process of ratifying a treaty with Swiss authorities to exchange information of Pakistani-owned bank accounts there. A whistleblowers' law would be enacted whereby individuals and firms who helped in trailing and recovering illegal money abroad would be awarded 20 per cent of the recovered amount. The government also announced the end of the Prime Minister's Laptop Scheme and other loss-making schemes of the previous government, which reportedly saved up to Rs. 80 billion in funds. The cabinet also gave its final approval to end discretionary funds for ministries and their divisions.

On 5 September, according to the Central Directorate of National Savings, the federal government had announced increasing profit rates on National Savings Schemes on a basis points range of 72 to 100. According to an official, profit rates are reviewed by the finance ministry based on current interest rates and the profit rates on government-related securities such as treasury bills and the Pakistan Investment Bonds (PIB).

On 7 September 2018, a petition was filed in Islamabad High Court asking to stop the auction to sell prime minister house vehicles as those vehicles are used by foreign dignitaries. If the vehicles are sold, the prime minister house will have to rent similar vehicles in case of visits by foreign dignitaries and it will be expensive for the exchequer. The petitioner also maintained that there was Rs80 million spent on the auction advertisement. Finance Minister Asad Umar said the government wanted to boost exports, and in this regard complete support would be provided to export-based industries including textiles, during a meeting in Islamabad with All Pakistan Textile Mills Association, also attended by the government's textile and industry advisor, Abdul Razak Dawood. Also discussed were gas and electricity prices, on which Umar said no decision had been reached by the government to increase tariffs as reported in the media, in addition to withdrawing sales taxes and customs on imported raw materials, refunds of sales taxes, market-based exchange rates, duty drawback schemes and increasing the tax net. He said the government would provide gas and electricity to export-based sectors at regionally competitive rates, as promised prior the elections. He also met fertiliser manufacturers on the issue of pricing and subsidies with reference to their windfall profits made last year, and refusing to accept their demands, said manufacturers should shut down their units if they were not profitable at current prices; he said the new government's priority was to provide fertilisers to farmers "at affordable rates" and this had been part of their original commitments. Umar also chaired a meeting of the National Executive Committee (NEC), which was formed to monitor the country's anti-money laundering measures and countering of finances to terrorist organisations, as mandated by the Financial Action Task Force which had grey-listed Pakistan months earlier. Umar said implementation of the relevant measures would ensure Pakistan successfully meets international standards under the FATF action plan.

On 8 September, the PTI government scaled-down spending on the federal development program to Rs. 775 billion from Rs. 1,030 billion, under the 2018–19 Pakistan federal budget. The Planning Commission released Rs.35 billion for development projects, which was around 75% less than the same period last year, Rs. 135 billion. The cuts were due to several "non-development projects" of the previous PML-N government under the Public Sector Development Programme (PSDP) facing the axe, as well as projects of governments before it, which had all been moved out of the PSDP. An official said the government would spend part of the savings on water sector projects, and also incorporate some of its own critical, priority projects under the spending regime. The progress of CPEC projects, including the Gwadar Smart Port City Master Plan and the structuring of industrial zones, were also reviewed.

On 27 September, eight buffaloes from the Prime Minister's house were auctioned for nearly Rs. 2.3 million (US$8,200).

== Environmental initiatives ==
On 24 August 2018, the cabinet decided to commence a major tree plantation project. A task force was created to launch a cleanliness drive in the country.

Climate change adviser Malik Amin Aslam informed about the first phase launch of 10-billion tree tsunami drive, and announced that 1.5 million saplings will be planted on 2 September 2018 for which 190 plant collection stations will be set up around the country from where the public will be able to collect saplings for plantation.

On 2 September 2018, Khan arrived in Haripur and planted a sapling to commence the Plant for Pakistan drive. Under the campaign, the government aimed to plant at least 1.5 million saplings initially, and achieve 'ten billion' tree plantations by the end of its term, as part of its "tree tsunami" and green environment policy to tackle climate change and air pollution.

On 13 October, Khan launched the "Clean and Green Pakistan" initiative at a school in Islamabad, where he also planted a sapling. Under the campaign, the government would aim to plant 10 billion trees by the end of its term, and also improve the country's sewage and sanitation system. Whilst addressing school students, Khan emphasised the importance of trees in the context of global warming and pollution mitigation and stressed the important role that students played in creating awareness of the environmental movement. He said the cleanliness drive would also extend to impoverished areas such as slums, and that his aim was to bring Pakistan on par with Europe in terms of cleanliness during his term.

== Water conservation initiatives ==
The Asian Development Bank approved a $100 million grant to address water scarcity projects in Balochistan on 4 September. On 7 September 2018, Khan made his second televised address to the nation. The speech, which was only a few minutes long, stressed the importance of the Diamer-Bhasha Dam and the extremely critical need for water storage infrastructure in Pakistan's immediate future, which was faced with the threats of severe drought and depletion of resources. Khan called on overseas Pakistanis and also appealed to all country folk to generously donate to the public fund created by the Chief Justice of Pakistan which sought to raise money for the dam project; he stated: "Our debt today stands at Rs30,000 billion but the biggest problem we currently face is the water crisis... When Pakistan was made, every Pakistani had 5600 cubic metres of water. Today that stands at only 1000 cubic metres... If every overseas Pakistani donates $1,000, we will have enough to build the dams ourselves... I know not every overseas Pakistani will be able to give $1,000, especially the ones working in the Middle East. To them, I would say that donate as much as you can... We alone will have to build this dam, and we can. We just have to make up our minds." He also cited an example of Egypt, where a similar public drive had been launched to build dams using national resources and said Pakistan's current situation with rising foreign debt necessitated the need to reduce external financing. According to Khan, Pakistan's current water storage capacity could last only 30 days in critical times whereas the internationally safe capacity was 120 days.

The speech was welcomed by Pakistanis abroad. Government departments and the private sector committed themselves to the cause; the Punjab government declared that all provincial cabinet members would be donating one month's worth of salary to the dam fund, while the railways' ministry which announced it would donate Rs. 100 million to the dam fund every year. Real estate tycoon Malik Riaz and ARY Digital Network president Salman Iqbal donated 50 million and 10 million rupees to the fund respectively. The Express Tribune reported that before Khan's speech, the dam fund established by Chief Justice of Pakistan had already collected around Rs 1.93 billion, and the vast majority (around Rs 1.91 billion) of funds had been raised domestically. According to the source, there was widespread enthusiasm among overseas compatriots to donate but they could not do so due to the select number of Pakistani bank branches abroad, as well as a lack of awareness on where, how and which avenues to donate through. The Chief Justice provided special instructions to the Governor of the State Bank of Pakistan to resolve these issues on an urgent basis.

== Relations with the military ==
On 21 August 2018, Khan paid tribute to sufferers of terrorism and sang praise for the military and security agencies of Pakistan for combating terrorism.

On 27 August 2018, Pakistan Army chief Qamar Javed Bajwa extended his congratulations to Khan on being elected as premier; the two held their first meeting at Khan's office, during which the country's ongoing security situation and peace efforts were also discussed.

On 30 August 2018, Khan paid his first visit to General Headquarters (Pakistan Army) in Rawalpindi. The iconic claim of "civil-military leadership on one page" came on the new government's day 13 when information minister cleared all doubts of differences between the civilian government and the military leadership by repeating that sentence but added that this time "they share the same book" as well. Khan's meeting at the GHQ lasted eight hours, during which he received briefings on highly sensitive and confidential security matters from the military establishment. Next day, Khan invited prominent journalists and took them into confidence about his visit to GHQ.

On 3 September 2018, at his office, Khan held a one-on-one meeting with army chief General Qamar Javed Bajwa, the third such meeting since Khan assumed office. According to a press release, issues discussed included "matters related to security" which were broadly defined as "Defence Day, US-Pakistan relations, and the internal and external security situation". The meeting came ahead of U.S. Secretary of State Mike Pompeo's scheduled visit to Pakistan on 5 September. Defence analysts suggested the meeting was held to chalk out the government and military's joint strategy with respect to the U.S.

On 6 September, the country observed its annual Defence Day honouring soldiers and martyrs who died for the country. The event was held at the General Headquarters and attended by political leaders, members of the military, civil society and many notable public celebrities. During his address on the occasion, Khan paid tribute to the Pakistani soldiers and common people who died in past and present wars, and said the armed forces would "spare no effort to protect the motherland". He added: "Furthermore, we all collectively will face our problems following the Quaid's principles of faith, unity and discipline. Let's play our role with diligence and devotion for the progress of the country". Khan also said his foreign policy would prioritise the nation's interests above all else, that Pakistan would "not become part of a war of any other country" in the future, and that he had been against the very war on terror from the beginning. He also ruled out the frequently discussed "civil-military" dynamics as a myth, stating that "There is no such thing as a civil-military tug of war... Our goals are same, that is to make Pakistan as one of the greatest countries of the world".

On 7 September, the Chairman of the Joint Chiefs of Staff Committee, general Zubair Mahmood Hayat, held a meeting with Khan at the Prime Minister's office and discussed matters relating to the armed forces.

On 6 October, Khan visited Quetta along with army chief Qamar Javed Bajwa, his first trip to Balochistan after taking charge. He was received at the airport by the chief minister Jam Kamal Khan. During his trip, Khan received a briefing from Bajwa on the province's security matters at Southern Command Headquarters, and held meetings with the province's governor, chief minister, provincial cabinet members, and civil society representatives to assess the progress of development projects. The briefings included discussions on the Khushal Balochistan development program, security of CPEC projects underway throughout the province, and progress in fencing off the Pakistan–Afghanistan border. He was accompanied by Senate chairman Sadiq Sanjrani, deputy National Assembly speaker Qasim Khan Suri and interior minister Shehryar Khan Afridi.

== Foreign relations ==
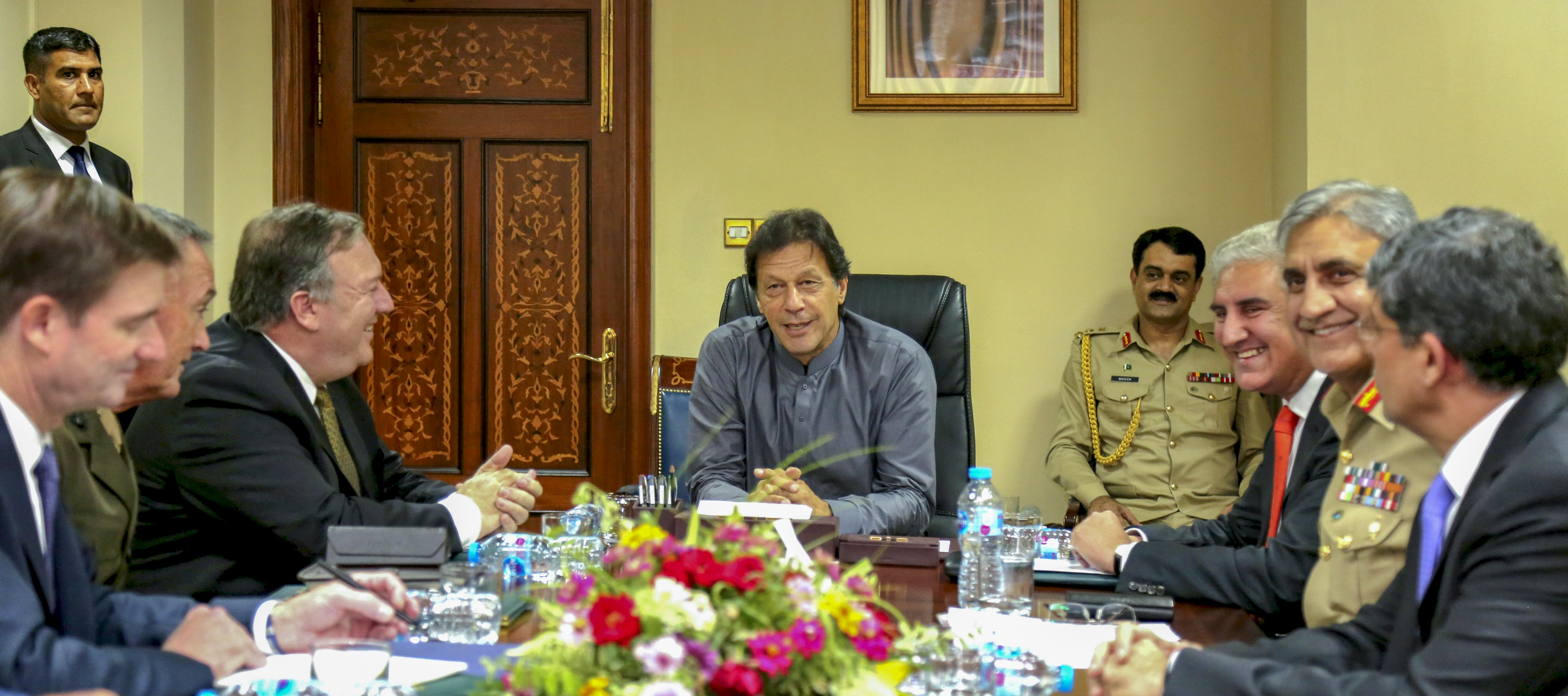
Khan speaks with U.S. Secretary of State Mike Pompeo and his delegation in Islamabad, September 2018

Shah Mehmood Qureshi was sworn in as the new Foreign Minister, along with the rest of Khan's cabinet, on 20 August. Qureshi held his first press conference as foreign minister, during which he said the new government's foreign policy would put "Pakistan first" and "begin and end at Pakistan", emphasizing a focus on national interests. He said all policies would be made at the Foreign Office, and expressed willingness to consult previous foreign ministers, retired diplomats as well as important institutions whilst devising the foreign policy. He briefly touched upon Pakistan's relations with its neighbourhood, the United States and China, and outlined the government's visions and road map in the months to come.

On 21 August 2018, in line with his agenda of promoting the interests of expatriate Pakistanis, Khan stressed the importance of the contributions made by 400,000 Pakistanis living in Canada during a call with Justin Trudeau. Prime minister Imran Khan offered India peace talks to improve mutual relationships for better trade and normalise the situation in the region. He further said that the only way to move forward is through dialogues.

On 23 August 2018, Khan offered humanitarian assistance to flood ravaged Kerala.

On 24 August, Khan paid his first visit to Pakistan's Foreign Office, where he was received by the foreign minister and officers of the Foreign Service. He received a briefing from officials on the country's present foreign policy, political and security dynamics, and Pakistan's relations with several key countries. Khan emphasised that he would pursue an independent and proactive foreign policy with "no compromise on national interests", seek relations based on parity, and bridge the trust deficits in regional relations. He also said Pakistan's overseas embassies would adopt a key role in this.

On 24 August 2018, a dispute arose after Mike Pompeo's call with Khan with US State Department saying that Pompeo discussed "terrorists operating from within Pakistan" while Pakistan's foreign office denying it in the strongest possible words but US State Department reaffirming its statement even after Pakistan's denial.

On 27 August, the Chinese and Saudi Arabian ambassadors met Khan separately at his office, during which the envoys congratulated Khan and discussed the strength and progress of China–Pakistan relations and Pakistan–Saudi Arabia relations respectively.

On 28 August 2018, responding to a letter from the Asia director of Human Rights Watch, Khan's human rights minister urged the organization to take up the matter of human rights violations against Palestinians by Israel and against Muslims living in the European countries in the form of restrictions on their dress code, building houses of worship, and the attacks on their religion. A nine-member Indian delegation under the Permanent Indus Commission arrived in Pakistan on a two-day visit to discuss water sharing rights as per the Indus Waters Treaty, and to discuss bilateral concerns on current hydro-projects. Both sides agreed to allow each other to tour and inspect hydro-projects on their respective sides.

On 30 August 2018, United States State Department released the transcript of the call between Pompeo and Khan which proved that Pompeo discussed "terrorists operating from Pakistan", leading analysts to claim a diplomatic embarrassment for the Pakistani government. However, the Pakistani foreign ministry released a statement that it wanted to bury the matter and move forward ahead of Pompeo's visit to Pakistan scheduled over the coming week: "Foreign Minister Shah Mehmood Qureshi has already issued a detailed clarification and we will not comment further on this matter". According to another official: "Now, we don't want to create more misunderstandings as we already have trust issues with the US. Raising this issue further could mean more misunderstandings". The same day, the Japanese foreign minister Kazuyuki Nakane arrived in Pakistan on a two-day visit to consolidate both countries "excellent bilateral relations", and held talks with the new government. He was one of the first foreign dignitaries to visit the country following the formation of the new government. Pakistan's finance minister Asad Umar notably gave his first foreign interview to a Japanese agency, and both sides emphasised increasing their current bilateral trade, as well as continuing Japanese projects inside Pakistan. Japan agreed to extend over Rs 2.6 billion worth of grants to inaugurate a weather surveillance installation in Multan, and a human resource development program.

On 31 August 2018, Khan denied a phone call to French president Emmanuel Macron twice during a meeting with journalists. Later, he talked to the French president, both counterparts exchanged views about mutual cooperation. In a separate development, Khan said his government will not accept any unfair demands by the United States. He added that Pakistan seeks to improve ties with Washington and peaceful relations in the region. The prime minister further added that government would cancel any agreements made against national interests by previous governments. Iranian Foreign Minister Mohammad Javad Zarif along with Iran's military chief arrived on a two-day official visit, becoming the first foreign dignitaries to visit the new Pakistani leadership. Both sides' civil and military sides held joint talks. The visit and the developments surrounding it were viewed positively. Pakistan expressed its support to Iran over its ongoing nuclear deal row with the United States. Pakistan's foreign ministry confirmed that it was closing down its consulate in Jalalabad, Afghanistan, reportedly due to security issues and interference by Nangarhar provincial governor Hayatullah Hayat "in the affairs of the consulate" which it said was in violation of the Vienna Convention. According to Pakistan, it had apprised the Afghan government. Afghanistan's foreign ministry spokesman said the matter was due to a simple "misunderstanding", and assured all issues would be resolved soon following meetings with Pakistani officials at the Kabul embassy, following which the consulate will be reopened.

On 2 September 2018, The Pentagon said it had cancelled $300 million in aid to Pakistan, supposedly due to a lack of "decisive action against militants". The suspension was in addition to another $500 million worth of Coalition Support Funds which had been withheld earlier in the year under the Trump administration and was done to ratchet up pressure according to observers. The news came ahead of a scheduled visit to Islamabad by U.S. Secretary of State Mike Pompeo and Chairman of the Joint Chiefs of Staff, general Joseph Dunford. Analysts speculated on how the developments may tie with Khan's past stance against U.S. drone strikes, and his complete opposition to the U.S. presence inside Afghanistan. Pakistan's foreign minister said that this money was not an aid instead it was a due right of Pakistan as a reimbursement for the losses suffered by the country in the war on terror. Prime minister of Bangladesh, Sheikh Hasina offered cooperation to Khan's government saying that the cooperation will be for the welfare of masses of Pakistan and not the "conspirators" and she expressed hope that Khan can "hit all the sixes" by staying in power.

On 3 September, a meeting was reported between army chief General Qamar Javed Bajwa and Khan. The two were reported to have touched upon the government and military's joint position vis-a-vis the United States, ahead of Pompeo's visit to Pakistan scheduled in two days. The Afghan foreign minister Salahuddin Rabbani telephoned Shah Mehmood Qureshi, during Rabbani congratulated the latter on his appointment and both sides discussed the reopening of the Pakistani consulate in Jalalabad.

On 4 September 2018, Khan reviewed the progress of energy projects such as Turkmenistan–Afghanistan–Pakistan–India Pipeline and Iran–Pakistan gas pipeline.

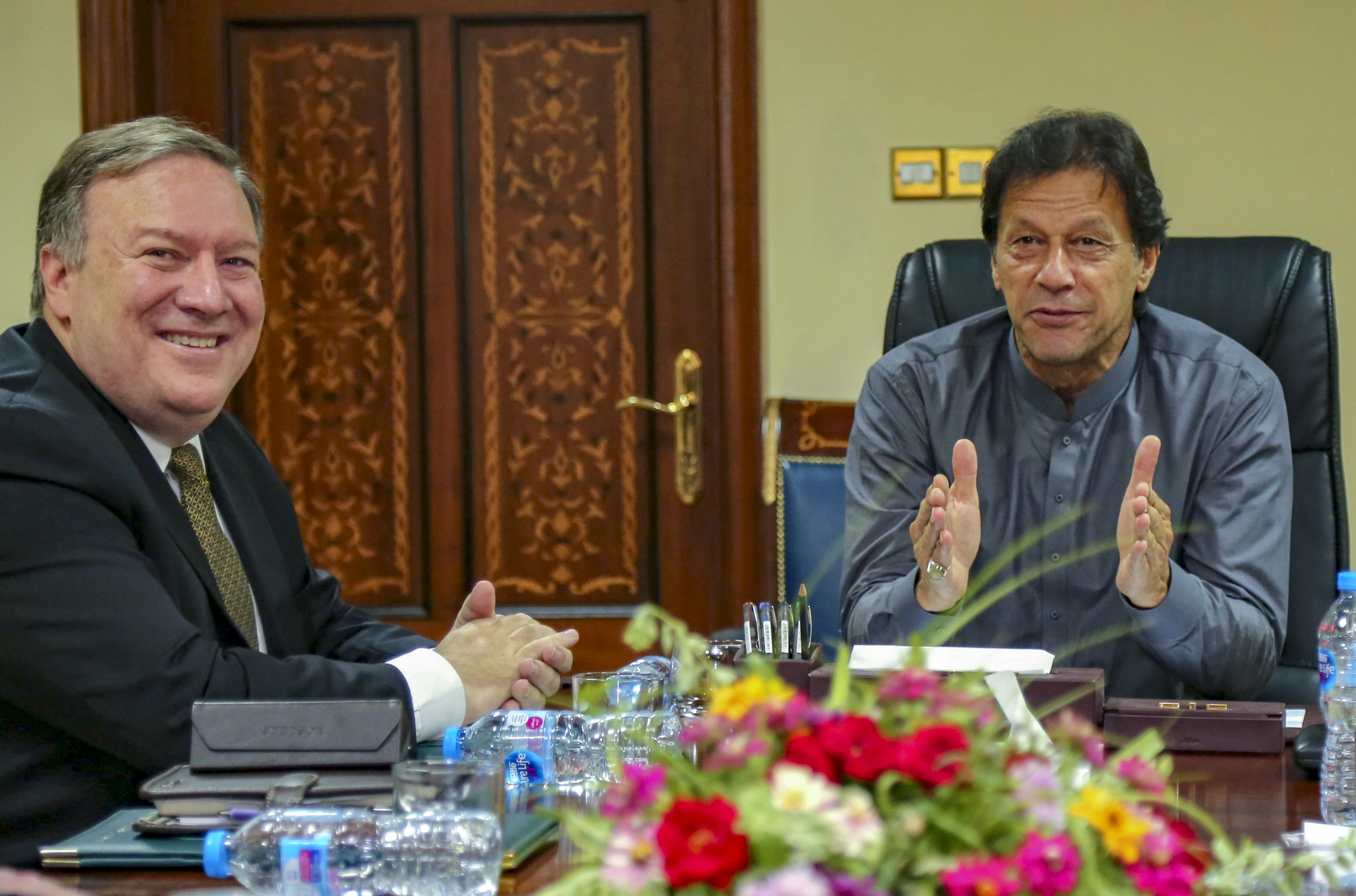
Mike Pompeo with Prime Minister Khan in Islamabad in September 2018

On 5 September 2018, U.S. Secretary of State Mike Pompeo arrived on a one-day visit to Islamabad as part of his South Asia tour, along with U.S. Chairman of the Joint Chiefs of Staff, General Joseph Dunford. Pompeo's delegation held meetings with the Foreign Minister Shah Mehmood Qureshi, followed by a meeting with Khan during which top Pakistani military officials were also present. Both sides discussed "bilateral, regional and international issues". Following the meeting with Khan, Pompeo said he was "hopeful" of resetting bilateral relations, adding that "I'm hopeful that the foundation that we laid today will set the conditions for continued success" and said ensuring peace in Afghanistan was a "shared goal" of both countries. Prior to leaving for Pakistan, Pompeo had said: "First stop Pakistan; a new leader there. I wanted to get out there at the beginning of his [Khan's] time in an effort to reset the relationship between the two countries... There are lots of challenges between our two nations for sure, but we’re hopeful that with the new leadership, we can find common ground and begin to work on some of our shared problems together... So we’ll have three opportunities to walk through the complexity that is this relationship and hopefully begin to make some progress so that we can get back to a set of common understandings... We need Pakistan to seriously engage to help us get to the reconciliation we need in Afghanistan". The U.S. embassy issued a press release stating Pompeo "emphasised the important role Pakistan could play in bringing about a negotiated peace in Afghanistan, and conveyed the need for Pakistan to take "sustained and decisive measures against terrorists and militants threatening regional peace and stability". Pakistan's foreign minister Shah Mehmood Qureshi held a press conference following the meetings however and said, while responding to questions, that there was no demand of "do more" from Washington. Qureshi said there had been a 'forward movement', and that the negotiations, which he described as being held in a very "cordial and positive" environment, set the stage for "resetting the ties and the impasse in the relationship has been broken." He dismissed perceptions that there had been any tough talks from either side during the meeting, stating the environment of the meeting had in fact resulted in ice being thawed. He also said that the prime minister and army leadership had participated in the main meeting jointly, to send a message that all institutions were on the same page. Regarding Afghanistan's peace process, he commented that "This is the position Imran has been advocating for years. It is a welcome development that the US has expressed readiness for direct talks with the Taliban." Information minister Fawad Chaudhry that nearly 3,000 Pakistani prisoners facing death row in Iran were going to be granted relief in the wake of Tehran amending its anti-narcotics laws, and that the Pakistani government had raised this matter with Iranian foreign minister Javad Zarif during his visit.

A Saudi trade delegation led by the Saudi deputy minister for foreign trade, Abdul Rahman Al-Harbi, met with Pakistani trade and commerce ministry officials led by commerce secretary Mohammed Younus Dagha in Islamabad. Both sides pledged to boost their $3.2 billion trade further, as well as increasing investment and private sector trade, and expanding ties in the oil, gas and petrochemical sectors. Indonesia announced that it was sending a trade mission to Pakistan to study its industry, and also to tap the local market for its palm oil exports.

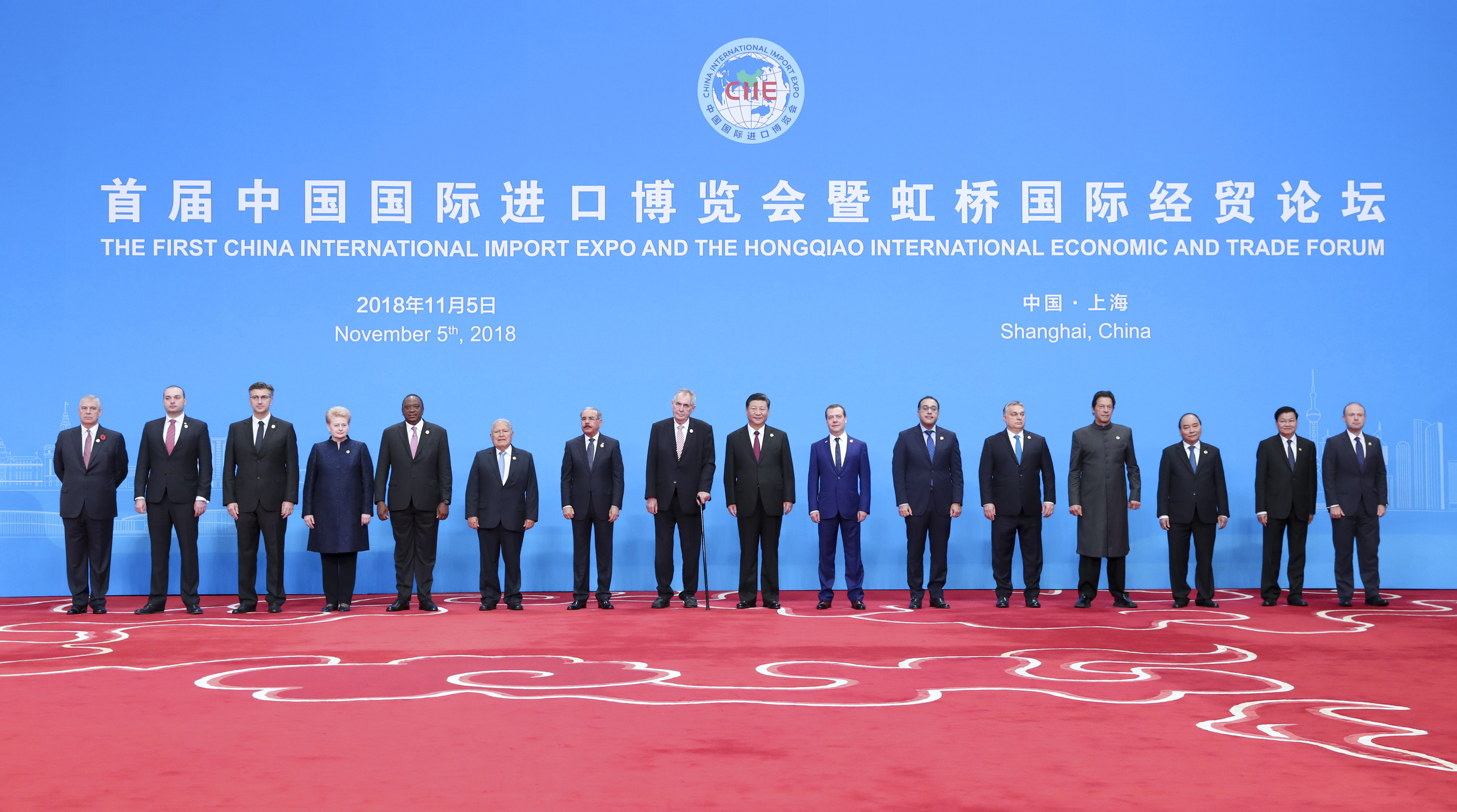
Khan at the first China International Import Expo in November 2018

On 7 September, China's foreign minister Wang Yi became the latest foreign dignitary after Iran, Japan, and the United States, to arrive in Pakistan, on a three-day visit to discuss bilateral relations and the ongoing economic projects under the multibillion China-Pakistan Economic Corridor. Wang met with Qureshi, as did their respective delegations, and also met Khan and army chief Qamar Javed Bajwa. Following their meeting, the two foreign ministers held a press conference during which both announced the two countries had agreed to deepen their ongoing strategic cooperation. Qureshi said CPEC was a vital instrument of Pakistan's socio-economic development and said both sides touched upon their bilateral trade, poverty alleviation efforts, cultural links, job creations and education sector developments. Previously, Khan had made many references to emulating the Chinese model of rapid social and economic development in Pakistan. The Chinese side lauded Pakistan's counter-terrorism efforts, and Yi emphasised that "China will continue to support Pakistan as per its foreign policy". He extended an invitation to Khan to attend the 2018 Chinese International Import Expo as a guest of honour. The two sides appreciated Pakistan's provision of security to Chinese citizens in Pakistan which included workers. Yi also offered clarification on China's One Belt, One Road projects in Pakistan under the aegis of the CPEC, and said the projects were not "debt" but rather investments that would "unleash huge economic benefits.. and these will create considerable returns to the Pakistani economy." He explained the CPEC projects had so far created 70,000 jobs in Pakistan and added to economic growth by one to two per cent. An article in The Financial Times dated 9 September claimed that Pakistan was planning to renegotiate the terms of agreements existing under CPEC, especially those that were perceived to be tilted away from Pakistan's favour; the report quoted Abdul Razzaq Dawood, the cabinet member for commerce, textiles and industry stating: "The previous government did a bad job negotiating with China on CPEC — they didn't do their homework correctly and didn't negotiate correctly so they gave away a lot. Chinese companies received tax breaks, many breaks and have an undue advantage in Pakistan; this is one of the things we're looking at because it's not fair that Pakistan companies should be disadvantaged". However, this report was swiftly refuted later by both Pakistani and Chinese government sources; Dawood said he had been quoted "out of context" in many parts of the report, on which he would be adding clarification, while the commerce ministry said CPEC was a national priority under Pakistan's long-term economic plans whose future held "complete unanimity". The Chinese embassy in Islamabad clarified that CPEC was a mutually beneficial project, which was being carried forward by both governments "according to the needs of Pakistan and for the development of Pakistan".

On 7 September, Saudi Arabia's minister for information and culture Awwad Alawwad also arrived in the country and met his Pakistani counterpart, Fawad Chaudhry. The two discussed extending the current Pakistani-Saudi cooperation in all fields, particularly economic development and the media sector. The Saudi minister was also poised to meet Khan, in addition to the political and military leadership. Pakistan expressed its support for ongoing Saudi reforms, including the Vision 2030. Alawwad said Saudi Arabia enjoyed strong and deep relations with Pakistan based on mutual trust.

== Stand on blasphemous caricature contest ==
On 20 August 2018, the cabinet condemned the government of Netherlands' action to allow an MP to display "blasphemous caricatures" . On 27 August 2018, while addressing the National Assembly of Pakistan Khan said that his government will bring forth the issue of sacrilegious caricatures in United Nations General Assembly and it will also push the Organization of Islamic Cooperation to formulate a united framework against the publication of such caricatures. On 28 August 2018, Pakistan formally registered its protest with the Dutch government over a proposed sacrilegious caricature competition by a Dutch MP, Geert Wilders. Foreign minister wrote a letter to OIC secretary-general to call up a meeting to discuss the matter of offensive caricatures. On 29 August 2018, the Tehreek Labbaik Pakistan head Khadim Hussain Rizvi demanded the government to cut all ties with Dutch government, kick out its ambassador from Islamabad, summon Pakistani ambassador back from Netherlands, and toughen the stance against United States since irreligious caricature contest judge is an American. Following Pakistan's diplomatic escalation to the Dutch government against a blasphemous caricature contest planned by Dutch MP Geert Wilders, he announced on 30 August 2018 that the contest had been cancelled for safety reasons. The Pakistani government credited their stance on the issue and said a "major crisis" had been averted. On Twitter, whilst reacting to a Pakistani foreign ministry statement, Wilders wrote: "Don't claim victory too soon. I am not finished with you yet. I will expose your barbarism in many other ways."

== Government reforms and other initiatives ==
On 17 August, a day before Khan took oath as premier, the Supreme Court ruled a landmark decision allowing overseas Pakistanis the right to vote via an internet system. The court had been hearing a petition filed by Khan who had long sought voting rights for Pakistanis abroad, with his party enjoying a large following amongst the diaspora. Overseas Pakistanis would be able to avail this right during the by-elections scheduled on October 14 for 37 constituencies. On 21 August 2018, Khan directed to make plans for treatment of table tennis player Mehak Anwar who is the daughter of a peon and is suffering from cancer. Same day, the information minister Fawad Chaudhry announced that government is ending political censorship from state-run media outlets such as Pakistan Television Corporation and Radio Pakistan so they can produce content with complete freedom instead of just singing praise for the government. Elaborating on the media policy days later, Fawad Chaudhry said the government was proposing to merge the existing Pakistan Electronic Media Regulatory Authority (PEMRA) and Press Council of Pakistan into one top body, which would be rechristened as the Pakistan Media Regulatory Authority (PMRA). There was also a desire to strengthen existing cyber laws under the aegis of the Federal Investigation Agency.

On 23 August 2018, Khan told Chief Minister of Punjab, Sardar Usman Buzdar to work on changing the ways of Punjab Police.

On 24 August 2018, the cabinet decided to change the work hours from 8:00 am – 4:00 pm to 9:00 am – 5:00 pm in government offices. Khan ordered the formation of a task force to look into problems of katchi abadis (slums) in the country.

On 25 August 2018, an inquiry committee investigating Result Transmission System failure on election day recommended Khan to remove chairman and other officials at NADRA.

On 27 August 2018, the government directed Federal Investigation Agency to banish the VIP protocol at airports which is usually given to elites including military officials, judges, senior bureaucrats, journalists, legislators, and politicians. All previous governments decided about this measure but could never implement it.

On 28 August 2018, the cabinet gave ninety days to the task forces to come up with a plan to fulfil their assigned obligations while the prime minister will review their performance every fifteen days. It was also decided that the government will work with the opposition parties to bring about a consensus on the creation of South Punjab province so that a constitutional amendment can be tabled after ensuring two-thirds majority support in the parliament. The advisor Arbab Shehzad will work on speeding the process of the remainder of tasks for the merger of Federally Administered Tribal Areas into Khyber Pakhtunkhwa. Information minister Fawad Chaudhry announced the formation of a working committee headed by law minister Farogh Naseem which will plan to strengthen NAB laws and ensure inheritance rights for women.

On 29 August 2018, the government decided to create a new media regulatory authority called Pakistan Media Regulatory Authority by merging all existing such authorities. Aleem Khan announced that he will present a recommendation for a new local government system in Punjab to the prime minister on 1 September 2018, under this new system, local governments will have financial and administrative powers.

On 31 August 2018, Khan invited prominent journalists and took them into confidence about the security situation in the country, different challenges and policy road map. During this interaction, he asked the media to give his government three months to perform. Same day, talking about election mismanagement Azam Khan Swati a politician associated with the ruling party revealed that the government has decided to investigate allegations related to election mismanagement, he blamed NADRA for the failure of RTS on election day and exonerated Election Commission of Pakistan. He added that the appointment of the NADRA chairman by the previous government was controversial and he should be temporarily terminated for the inquiry to go forward. This drew a strong reaction from NADRA, the agency saying it's ready for a forensic audit.

On 1 September 2018, during a meeting headed by Chief Minister of Balochistan, Jam Kamal Khan the head of the coalition government supported by Imran Khan's party, the chief minister took initiatives to improve traffic and building management of Quetta city, he directed vehicle showrooms, storage facilities (godowns), and garages to be moved out of the city. He also directed not to issue any permits to the hospitals, and shopping malls that do not have a parking lot. He directed to complete installation of smart traffic signals at fourteen intersections in the city and the completion of the construction of public parking places. BBC appreciated a visible change in censorship policy of state-owned news media which included Radio Pakistan, Pakistan Television and social media accounts. It was noted that equal representation is given to opposition parties, which was strictly controlled previously in favour of the ruling party. Prime minister directed the Punjab government to take action against groups and mafias involved in encroachment and occupation of public properties. During a high-level meeting, he ordered to revamp local body system effectively, reform police system, reform the civil services and federal bureaucracy in line with a proposed government programme, remove barricades from Lahore city, and audit ongoing and completed projects for complete transparency. He also directed ministers of Punjab government to work towards implementation of "100 day agenda".

Khan ordered a comprehensive security plan for pilgrims visiting Iran, Iraq and other holy places in the month of Muharram. He formed a committee to devise a plan for a new local government system. The committee is tasked to present a proposal in one week time. The proposal will be submitted to provincial assemblies for approval. It was reported that the prime minister already has approved a proposal presented by information minister Fawad Chaudhry. According to that proposal, existing district governments will abolish and new governments at the tehsil level will be created. Tehsil mayors will head these governments while city mayors will oversee the whole system of tehsil governments in their respective cities. The city and the tehsil mayors will be directly elected by a 51% vote. It has also been decided that union councils will continue and will not be replaced by village councils. The opposition PML-N on 8 September threatened to launch mass protests against the government if it sought to abolish the existing local government system. Chief Minister Punjab, Usman Buzdar ordered anti-encroachment drive immediately across Punjab after the direction from the prime minister a day before. On 8 September, the first phase of the anti-encroachment drive was conducted in Islamabad under the Capital Development Authority; properties constructed on nearly two kilometres of illegally-occupied land were demolished and taken down. Fawad Chaudhry announced that the drives were being expanded into Karachi and Lahore, under the directives of the local governments there. Railway minister announced a train service between Rawalpindi and Mianwali, the ancestral city of Khan, the service will commence on 14 September 2018.

On 5 September 2018, the cabinet discussed policies relating to health, education, and water supply at the federal level. A task force on education, led by education minister Shafqat Mehmood, was set up to explore how to bring out-of-school children into education. Same day, Khan directed for a complete reformation of Pakistan Television and the constitution of the board of directors comprising professionals of integrity. On 5 September 2018, Khan ordered not to terminate any government employee or contractor except by a court order. The federal cabinet stated it was also abolishing the National Commission on Government Reforms (NCGR), and replacing it with a newly-appointed task force instead which would bring about reforms in the government structure and civil service. An Institutional Reforms Cell was set up in the Prime Minister's office to serve as the base of the task force, and the task force would put forth its proposals on reforms in 90 days. Issues pertaining to provincial matters would be put forth under the existing Council of Common Interests. On 7 September prime minister's office denied reports that any notification to terminate federal employees were ever issued and called an investigation of the matter.

On 5 September 2018, Governor of Sindh, Imran Ismail decided that Governor House will be open from 7 September for the people and educational tours for students to show them the articles used by Muhammad Ali Jinnah. It will be open for public every day. Later on 9 September 2018, Governor of Punjab, Chaudhry Mohammad Sarwar also opened the Governor's House (Lahore) and other Governor House (which is located in Murree) for the public. It will be open for public on every Sunday (10 am to 6 pm). On 1 October 2018, the Governor of Khyber Pakhtunkhwa, Shah Farman also opened the Governor's House (Peshawar) for public. On 6 September, task forces were set up separately to oversee the ongoing merger process of FATA with Khyber Pakhtunkhwa province, and the restructuring of the government and civil service. On 8 September, the PTI's Punjab government announced it was ending the "chit" system in government offices and that anyone seeking services would be allowed to enter the offices without a special permit. NAB sought records of all hospitals and health centres in Punjab, as part of its corruption allegations probe in the health sector. Interior Minister Shehryar Afridi assured pilgrims who were travelling to Iran during Muharram would be facilitated and given all necessary provisions. On 7 September, major reshuffles had been announced in the top cadres of Punjab and Sindh police; the government appointed new senior officers in key positions, including that of the provincial inspector-generals. Khan's two sons Sulaiman and Qasim also arrived in Pakistan from London on 8 September for a four-day visit, meeting their father for the first time since he became premier. They had previously been excluded from attending Khan's austere oath-taking ceremony as per his own directions. The ministry of religious affairs requested detailed feedback from all tour organisers on the quality of arrangements and facilities made for Pakistani pilgrims who had travelled to Saudi Arabia for the annual Hajj pilgrimage. The United Nations High Commissioner for Refugees, Filippo Grandi, arrived in Pakistan and toured major Afghan refugee settlements. He lauded Pakistan's contribution in hosting refugees for over three decades. He said arrangements were being made on the progressive repatriation of Afghans to Afghanistan.

In Lahore, a fire engulfed a high-rise plaza, Ali Towers, on M.M. Alam Road, leaving several people stranded inside the building. One man died of injuries after he jumped from the building to save himself. Fire brigades arrived on the site to douse off the flames. According to minister Fayaz-ul-Hasan Chohan, "every single person was rescued from the building". The plaza reportedly belonged to the son-in-law of Shehbaz Sharif. The Punjab chief minister ordered an immediate inquiry into the incident, and asked for a report from Punjab's inspector-general.

On 10 October, Khan launched the "Naya Pakistan Housing Program". Under the housing scheme, the government would aim to construct five million affordable houses for homeless people, and provide these homes within five years. Khan also announced that a National Financial Regulatory Body would be set up within 60 days to assist with the program's financial model and help arrange finances for the project. The law ministry would aim to deal with all legal hurdles being faced for the construction industry. At the same time, a housing colony was also announced for federal government employees known as the Federal Government Employees Scheme, which would be set up in coordination with the Punjab government.

== Acquittal and release of Asia Bibi ==
Following the acquittal of Asia Bibi, a Pakistani Christian who was charged with blasphemy and kept in solitary confinement for eight years until found innocent on 31 October 2018, Islamist Tehreek-e-Labbaik party members held protests across Pakistan that included "blocking roads and damaging infrastructure". Muhammad Afzal Qadri, a TLP co-founder, also called for the death of the three Supreme Court justices involved in hearing Bibi's appeal, stating "The Chief Justice and two others deserve to be killed ... Either their security guards, their drivers, or their chefs should kill them."

On 2 November 2018, the Government of Pakistan under the administration of Imran Khan and the Tehreek-e-Labbaik political party, which encouraged the protests against Asia Bibi, came into an agreement that barred Asia Bibi from leaving the country, in addition to releasing Tehreek-e-Labbaik protesters who were under arrest. The deal includes expediting a motion in the court to place Asia Noreen on Pakistan's no fly list, known officially as the Exit Control List (ECL). Due to pressure from Tehreek-e-Labbaik, Pakistani authorities will not release Asia Noreen until the "Supreme Court makes a final review of its verdict" as "Ghulam Mustafa, the lawyer representing a provincial cleric in Punjab who had filed the initial blasphemy charges against Bibi, petitioned the Supreme Court requesting that the judges review her acquittal."

This agreement between the Government of Pakistan and Tehreek-e-Labbaik has led to "allegations [that] the government was capitulating to extremists". Pakistani Information Minister Fawad Chaudhry responded to these allegations, saying that "We had two options: either to use force and when you use force people can be killed. That is not something a state should do... We tried negotiations and (in) negotiations you take something and you leave something." Asia Noreen's lawyer Saif-ul-Mulook called the agreement between the Government of Pakistan and the Islamists "painful", stating that "They cannot even implement an order of the country's highest court". Feeling that his life was threatened, Mulook fled to Europe in order "to stay alive as I still have to fight the legal battle for Asia Bibi." British Pakistani Christian Association chairman Wilson Chowdhry stated that “I am not surprised that Imran Khan's regime has caved in to extremists”. Jemima Goldsmith, an ex-wife of Imran Khan, similarly "said that Pakistan's government caved in to extremist demands to bar Asia Bibi from leaving the country", opining "Not the Naya Pakistan we'd hoped for. 3 days after a defiant & brave speech defending the judiciary, Pakistan's gov caves in to extremist demands to bar #AsiaBibi from leaving Pak, after she was acquitted of blasphemy- effectively signing her death warrant."

On 7 November 2018, Asia Bibi was released from New Jail for Women in Multan, flown to PAF Base Nur Khan, from whence she then departed the country on a charter plane, to the Netherlands. Hafiz Shahbaz Attari of the Islamist political party Tehreek-e-Labbaik Pakistan (TLP), upon hearing the news, said that TLP members would gather in Islamabad and Rawalpindi to try and prevent the departure of Asia Bibi to the Netherlands.

== Legal challenges ==
On 6 September, the Lahore High Court received a Petition challenging Khan's election as Prime Minister. The petition argued that 69 members of the National Assembly, the lower house of Parliament, abstained from casting their vote in the session held to elect the new Prime Minister, and that therefore Khan had been elected unconstitutionally. The court admitted the petition, issued notices to the respondents and set a date of 1 November to hear the petitioner's case.

== Incidents ==
On 22 August 2018, the railway minister Sheikh Rasheed Ahmad allegedly "manhandled an elderly woman" who was weeping after his guards did not allow her to meet him. He then went on to break the phone of a TV cameraman who was trying to record the incident. On 26 August 2018, during his first meeting with Railway officials, Sheikh Rasheed Ahmed got upset over the briefing by officials in which the performance of railways under his predecessor Khawaja Saad Rafique was highlighted, Ahmed admonished the officials for praising the former minister which resulted in one of the officials requesting a long leave who stated that he will not be able to work under an "ill-mannered" and "unqualified" minister.

On 27 August 2018, a police officer from Pakpattan was removed from his duties as District Police Officer and transferred to Lahore as an OSD over a row with Khawar Maneka, former husband of Prime Minister Imran Khan's wife Bushra Bibi. Allegedly the officer was asked by Chief Minister of Punjab, Usman Buzdar to tender an apology to Bibi's former husband whose vehicle was chased by the said officer since he did not stop at the police check post. The officer declined the apology demand saying his department was not at fault. It is also reported that allegedly the first lady played a role in this demotion through the prime minister. However, IG Punjab, denied this story and maintained that he was transferred without any political interference, due to his misconduct during this incident and false reporting of this incident to his superiors.

On 28 August 2018, Pakistan Tehreek-e-Insaf's leader from Karachi, Aamir Liaquat Hussain seemed to distance himself from the party saying that he was being treated like an outsider. Taking account of that behaviour he might decide to sit on opposition benches.

On 30 August 2018, Fayyaz ul Hassan Chohan, Punjab government's minister for information and culture caused controversy by using obscene language against television staff and passing "vulgar and derogatory misogynistic remarks" against actresses of Lollywood. After it drew a huge storm of criticism Chohan tendered an apology to the actresses, he maintained, that he respects all actresses, the said remark was slip of tongue while answering the question on vulgar content in theatres.

On 1 September 2018, Chief Justice Saqib Nisar ordered one of PTI's lawmakers from Sindh, Imran Ali Shah, to donate Rs. 3 million to a public fund for the construction of Diamer-Bhasha Dam as a fine; Shah had been involved in a controversy days after the elections, when a video of him slapping and physically assaulting a man on the street during a heated argument surfaced online, sparking outrage on social media. Shah later apologised for his actions to the victim personally; his membership of PTI's Sindh chapter was suspended for a month, and he was also ordered by the party to pay Rs. 500,000 in fines as well as bear the costs of medical treatment for 20 patients at an Edhi Foundation centre. The case was marked closed.

== The role of opposition ==
On 8 September, Shehbaz Sharif, leader of the opposing PML-N held his first press conference since the general elections concluded. During the conference, Sharif accused Khan of coming into power through mass rigging and questioned why a parliamentary commission into rigging allegations had not been constituted yet. He also accused the PTI of increasing gas, electricity and fertilizer prices, criticized their progress in power generation projects in Khyber Pakhtunkhwa, lamented the government's abolishment of Prime Minister's Laptop Scheme initiated by Nawaz Sharif, and said Khan should attract investors for constructing the Diamer-Bhasha dam rather than relying only on collecting public funding. He also hit out at Khan's pronounced austerity measures, stating the PML-N had adopted such type of measures throughout its own tenure.

Ahead of the 2018 by-elections, it was announced that the two main opposition parties, PML-N and PPP, would be arranging seat adjustments with one another and contesting the by-polls together as a united front against the PTI. Imran Khan has again vowed not to let the corrupt go, which appears to be on the goal of the main opposition parties (NRO).

== See also ==
- Premiership of Imran Khan
