= Sanad =

Sanad may refer to:

== People ==
=== Given name ===
- Sanad Al Warfali (born 1992), Libyan footballer
- Sanad Ali (born 1988), Emirati footballer
- Sanad Bushara Abdel-Nadief (born 1947), Sudanese footballer
- Sanad ibn Ali (died 864), 9th century Iraqi Jewish astronomer, translator, mathematician and engineer
- Sanad ibn Rumaythah, Emir of Mecca from 1359 to 1360
- Sanad Sharahili (born 1986), Saudi Arabian footballer

=== Surname ===
- Ali Sanad (born 1986), Qatari footballer
- Maikel Nabil Sanad (born 1985), Egyptian-American political activist
- Mohamed Sanad, Egyptian antenna scientist
- Nesrin Sanad (born 1985), Egyptian actress

== Places ==
- Sanad, Bahrain, a place in Bahrain
- Sanad (Čoka), a village in Serbia
- Sanad, Tunisia, a place in Tunisia

== Other uses ==
- Sanad (deed), granted to princely rulers in British Raj

== See also ==
- Imtiazi Sanad, a Pakistani military award for gallantry or distinguished service in combat
- SANAD, a film lab at the Abu Dhabi Film Festival
- Sanad Rashed, Iran, a village in Iran
