= Nawab Mohammad Khan Jogezai =

Pashtun tribal leader

Nawab Mohammad Khan Jogezai (1884–missing) was a prominent Pashtun tribal leader from Baluchistan Province and the sole representative from the province in the Constituent Assembly of Pakistan.

== Early life ==
Jogezai was born to Bangul Khan Jogezai in 1884 at Killa Saifullah. In 1906, he was appointed a Sardar of the Bori Tahsil in Loralai District by the Coronation Durbar. Under the Sandeman system, these Sardars were paid monthly emoluments in return for maintaining peace in their frontier tracts; Jogezai received Rs. 1800, as of September 1935. (Note: The particular amount varied based on the perceived importance to British Government and often went into millions.)

== Political career ==
=== British India ===
In August 1946, Jafar Khan Jamali — then, an upstart leader of the provincial Muslim League — persuaded Jogezai to submit his candidature for representing Baluchistan Province at the Constituent Assembly of India as an independent candidate after Qazi Muhammad Isa, the original League candidate, refused to proceed with his candidature. (Note: The British Government had created a sixty-five member strong electoral college from the Shahi Jirga (forty six tribal elders) and the Quetta Municipality (nine nominated members + ten elected members from ten wards), given the lack of any elected legislature. Isa — a Muslim of no noble heritage — feared that neither the Sardars nor the non-Muslim members would vote for him; accordingly, he convinced the Khan of Kalat to withdraw Sardars belonging to his province from the electorate but failed to convince the Government in removing the non-Muslim members from the municipality. Unsure about his chances, he withdrew.) Jogezai's opponent was Abdul Samad Khan Achakzai of the Anjuman-i-Watan Baluchistan, who was supported by the Indian National Congress. It appears unlikely that any poll did take place; a pro-League faction of the electorate published public letters in local newspapers expressing support for Jogezai and soon enough, he had secured a super-majority of over forty signatures against a paltry ten by Achakzai. Despite the win, he abdicated attendance until the Mountbatten Plan sanctioned the creation of Pakistan and its own constituent assembly, obeying the League's orders.

During the Partition, Jogezai played a significant role in ensuring that the referendum on the province's accession to Pakistan passed smoothly despite opposition from Sardars who were either aligned to the Congress or the Khanate of Kalat, and preferred outright independence or accession to India. (Note: In the official narrative, members of the Shahi Jirga and Quetta Municipality had convened under Jogezai to approve the accession, unanimously. The unanimous nature of the referendum and the jurisdictional right of an unelected assembly to decide on such a question remains disputed to date and has catalyzed the Baloch Insurgency for decades.) Activists sympathetic to Baloch ethno-nationalist causes claim that Jogezai, having failed to win the confidence of the electorate in multiple discussions on the accession, had the final voting preponed by a day to eliminate dissenters. Yet, there was renewed pandemonium with representatives of tribal factions unclear on the implications of accession to their political future and no voting could take place; nonetheless, Jogezai, in connivance with the British Government, declared a successful accession. (Note: Less than a month later, the Sardar of the Bugtis petitioned the Governor General that notwithstanding his vote in favor of accession to Pakistan, his tribe shall be allowed to independently negotiate their rights with the successor government!) In contrast, pro-Pakistan authors concede that the accession was won by manipulations but downplay their significance; Jogezai's declaration of accession without depending on a poll is portrayed as an ingenious tribal strategy to outmaneuver the British Government who had apparently postponed the vote by a day to buy more time for the Indian National Congress. Martin Axmann, a German scholar specialising in colonial Balochistan, agrees that no meaningful voting did take place but finds it impossible to sieve out further truth from these competing claims — which failed to agree even on the basics like the strength of the electorate or the date of accession — in light of a lack of archival sources; however, he notes that the accession had popular support and would have succeeded irrespective of Jogezai's alleged stratagems.

=== Pakistan ===
Jogezai had an insignificant role in the Constituent Assembly, choosing to remain absent during most of the proceedings. Records show that he took part in a division of the house only once voting against an amendment that sought to prevent the state from suspending fundamental rights on grounds of "internal discontent"; he did not table any amendment and would deliver his solitary speech on 13 October 1953, a year before the eventual dissolution of the Assembly, criticizing the denial of political reforms in Balochistan as an insult to Jinnah's (and the League's) assurances before and during the accession.

In June 1949, Jogezai was appointed an advisor to Mian Aminuddin, the Chief-Commissioner of the province before being replaced in August, 1950. (Note: Initially, pursuant to Jinnah's assurances about democratizing Balochistan, a multi-member non-partisan council was planned to be installed in an advisory role but with certain binding powers. However, it fizzled down both in strength — with the only other member being Qazi Mohammad Isa — and power, becoming a mere forwarding post to the Commissioner. Isa notwithstanding his erstwhile loyalty to the League became a fervent critic of Pakistan's top-down approach in administering the province and allegedly, even urged Balochs to take up arms against the government.) In March 1952, he was appointed by the Assembly as a member of the Advisory Committee for the Ministry of States and Frontier Regions. (Note: His four colleagues were Bhabesh Chandra Nandi, Nur Ahmed, Mumtaz Hasan Kizilbash, and Amir Azam Khan.) In September 1958, the Government of Pakistan chose Jogezai as its envoy to pacify the Khanate of Kalat who — in collaboration with Achakzai, Abdul Ghaffar Khan, and others — rejected the One Unit Scheme and demanded the restoration of his erstwhile territories as a single state; the parley failed and martial law was imposed the next month after, leading to the Jhalwan Disturbances.

In the 1970 Pakistani general election, Jogezai was nominated by the Qayyum Muslim League from Quetta I; he was defeated by Maulvi Abdul Haq.

== Death and legacy ==
Jogezai's family remains significant in Baloch politics. His elder son Taimoor Shah Jogezai was the Health Minister in 1980s ; the younger son, Jahangir Shah Jogezai was a bureaucrat before his appointment to the Senate in 1985. Among his grandsons, Nawab Ayaz Jogezai has served in the Provincial Assembly, the National Assembly, and the Senate.
