= Nesrin Sanad =

Egyptian actress, model

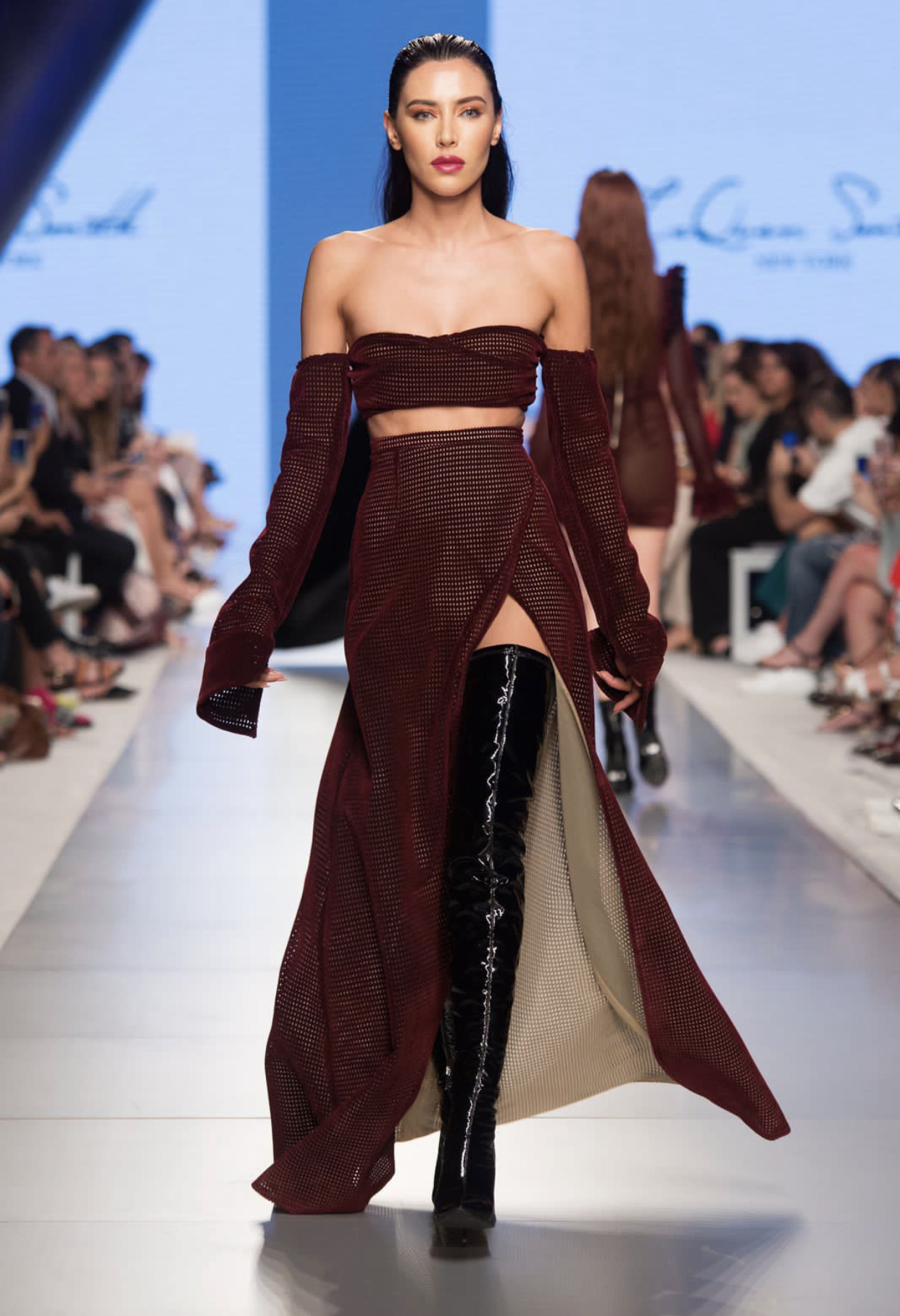
- Occupations: actress, model, Internet personality
- Years active: 2007 - present
- Modelling information
- Height: 176 cm (5 ft 9 in)
- Hair colour: Brown
- Eye colour: Light Brown
- Website: nesrinsanad.com

Nesrin Sanad is an Egyptian actress, model, Internet personality and painter. Her acting roles include appearances in Ghafwa and Sea Shadow and Adam. As a model, she has been photographed for magazines such as Grazia, Harper’s Bazaar Serbia, and L’Officiel.

== Career ==
Sanad appeared in the Emirati film Sea Shadow, which was released in 2011. She also appeared as an extra in the film Furious 7.

Sanad starred in the short film Adam, which was written and directed by Amani Alsaied and based on the 2011 Syrian Revolution. The film premiered at the Cannes Film Festival in 2015.

Sanad starred in a short fashion film for designer Faissal El-Malak’s Fall 2018 collection, which was released through Vogue Arabia.

In 2022, Sanad was named “Motivational Lifestyle Influencer of the Year” at the World Influencer Business Awards (WIBA), which were held at the Cannes Film Festival.

After receiving this award, she was profiled in Grazia and Harper’s Bazaar Serbia. In the same year, she appeared in pictorials for L’Officiel and the Croatian magazine Stilueta.

Sanad has walked the runway at fashion shows such as Paris Fashion Week, representing brands such as Chanel, Gucci, and Cartier. She has also served as a brand ambassador for APM Monaco, Aldo, Agent Provocateur, and Fashion Nova. She has also appeared in photo shoots for brands such as the French sportswear and watch brand Grandeur, Fragrance du Bois, and Eforea Spa.

In June 2022, Sanad confirmed her plans to film a documentary about Arab fashion.

In June 2023, Sanad attended the Happy Hearts Fundraiser in Czech Republic, along with her husband, where they donated funds to the organization which would help schools in compromised counties.

== Personal life ==
Sanad is married. She lived in UAE for about 2 decades, but now resides in Istria, Croatia.

== Filmography ==
=== Film ===
| Year | Title | Role | Notes | Ref. |
|---|---|---|---|---|
| 2011 | Sea Shadow | Pretty Girl | Feature Film | |
| 2014 | Adam | Hawwa | Short Film | |
| 2015 | Furious 7 | Extra | Feature Film | |
| 2018 | Faissal El-Malak: Fall 2018 Collection | Model | Fashion film | |
| 2019 | Ghafwa | | Feature Film | |

=== Television ===
| Year | Title | Role | Notes | Ref. |
|---|---|---|---|---|
| 2014 | Shoufi Mafi | Presenter | TV series | |
