= Gul Mohammad Khan Jogezai =

Pakistani politician

Sardar Gul Mohammad Khan Jogezai was Governor of Balochistan, Pakistan from July 1991 to 1994. He was born into the Sardar Family of Jogezai sub-branch of Kakar Pashtun tribe in Killi Zingiwaal Bori Loralai Balochistan, Pakistan. His son Sardar Sikandar Hayat Khan Jogezai was the caretaker Federal Minister of Sports in the regime of President General Pervez Musharraf in 2008. In May 2010, Sardar Gul Mohammad Khan Jogezai was very ill and admitted to the kidney center in Quetta.
