= Nawab Ayaz Jogezai =

Pakistani politician

Nawab of Pashtuns Nawab Ayaz Khan Jogezai

Member of the National Assembly of Pakistan

Assembly Member for NA-200 (Zhob-cum-Killa Saifullah)
- In office 1993–1996

Member of the Senate of Pakistan
- In office 2003–2009

Member of the Provincial Assembly of Balochistan

Assembly Member for PB-3 (Quetta-III)
- In office 2013–2018

Personal details
- Born: 28 January 1959 (age 67) Killa Saifullah, Balochistan, Pakistan
- Party: PkMAP (1993-present)

Nawab Ayaz Khan Jogezai (Pashto: نواب محمد ایاز خان جوګېزی, Urdu: نواب محمد ایاز خان جوگیزئی; born 28 January 1959) is a Pakistani politician from Northern Balochistan and is serving as the Pashtun Nawab. He became Nawab after the death of Nawab Taimoor Shah Khan Jogezai. While he was still alive, Nawab Taimoor Shah Khan Jogezai nominated Nawab Mohammad Ayaz Khan Jogezai as the next Nawab. He survived an assassination attempt at Killa Saifullah in 1988 but was seriously injured. On the request of the Chairman of Pashtunkhwa Milli Awami Party, Mahmood Khan Achakzai, he joined the party. He was elected as a member of the National Assembly of Pakistan for NA-200 (Zhob-cum-Killa Saifullah in 1993 till 1996. He also remained a member of the Senate of Pakistan from 2003 to 2009. He contested for PB-3 (Quetta-III) constituency in the 2013 Balochistan provincial election and was successful. He was appointed Provincial Minister of Balochistan for Public Health and Engineering Department in 2013 and remained in office till 2018.

He is the convener of Pashtun Ulasi Qaumi Jirga ("Pashtun National Council"). The Jirga was held in March 1998 and was attended by the majority of tribal elders throughout Northern Balochistan (a heavily Pashtun populated area of Balochistan).

He participated in a Peace Jirga commissioned by Afghan President Hamid Karzai in late 2008. In Kabul, Nawab Jogezai had a series of meetings to discuss Pashtun unity with Asfandyar Wali Khan, Mahmood Khan Achakzai and President Karzai. He has good relation with Pashtun tribal leader Zafar Habib Kudezai.

From 11 to 14 March 2022, he was part of the Pashtun National Jirga, which was held in Bannu, Khyber Pakhtunkhwa to discuss the critical issues faced by the Pashtuns in Pakistan and Afghanistan.
