= Liwa Zainabiyoun =

Shia Pakistani militia

Liwa Zainabiyoun لواء زينبیون
- Official flag of the group
- Other name: Hezbollah of Pakistan
- Founder: Qasem Soleimani X
- Founding leader: Uzair Saeed Yousafzai †
- Military leader: Irshad Hussain Qalander X
- Known Commanders: Saqib Haider Karbalai (alias "Haj Haider") † (2012–2017); Abid Hussain Turi (Tehran Turi) (2017–2021)
- Dates active: 2012 (de facto, but officially in late 2014) – present
- Split from: Sipah-e-Muhammad Pakistan
- Allegiance: Iran; IRGC
- Headquarters: Iran (Mashhad and Qom)
- Active regions: Syria (until 2024); Iraq (2016–2018, 2024–2025); Yemen (in Houthi territory)
- Ideology: Shia Islamism; Jihadism (Shia); Khomeinism; Wilayat al Faqih; Anti-Zionism; Anti-Americanism; Anti-Salafism; Factions: Sectarianism
- Status: Active
- Size: ~Several hundreds (est. 2014) c. 800–2400+ (est. 2019) c. 2500–4500+ (est. 2020/24) c. 2,000–5,000+ (est. 2021) c. 5,000–8,000+ (est. 2025)
- Part of: Islamic Revolutionary Guard Corps; Axis of Resistance
- Wars: Iran–Israel proxy conflict; Iran–Saudi Arabia proxy conflict; Syrian Civil War; Battle of Aleppo (2012–2016); Aleppo offensive (October–November 2016); Aleppo offensive (November–December 2016); Siege of Deir ez-Zor (2014–2017); Palmyra offensive (2017); Hama offensive (March–April 2017); Battle of Khasham; Northwestern Syria offensive (December 2019–March 2020); War in Iraq (2013–2017); Yemeni Civil War; Sectarian violence in Pakistan; 2007 Kurram Agency conflict; 2023 Kurram Parachinar conflict; 2024 Kurram conflict

The Followers of Zainab Brigade (Arabic: لِوَاء الزَّيْنَبِيُون, romanized: Liwā' az-Zaynabīyūn, Persian: لواء زينبیون, romanized: Liwa Zeinabiyoun, Urdu: لواء زينبیون, romanized: Liwa Zaynabiyoun) also known as the Zainabiyoun Brigade, (Note: Urdu: زینبیون بریگیڈ, romanized: Zainabiyoun Brigade or Persian: تیپ زینبیون, romanized: Tyip Zainebiyoun)) Lashkar-e-Zainabiyoun, (Note: Persian: لشکر زينبیون, romanized: Lashkar-e-Zeinabiyoun, Urdu: لشکر زینبیون, romanized: Lashkar-e-Zaynabiyoun, Arabic: فرقة الزَّيْنَبِيُون, romanized: Fir'qat az-Zaynabīyūn)) or the Zainabiyoun Division, (Note: Persian: لشکر زينبیون, romanized: Lashkar-e-Zeinabiyoun, Urdu: زینبیون ڈویژن, romanized: Zaynabiyoun Dvision, Arabic: فرقة الزَّيْنَبِيُون, romanized: Fir'qat az-Zaynabīyūn)) is a Shia Pakistani Khomeinist militia group. It was actively engaged in the Syrian Civil War against ISIL. It draws recruits mainly from Shia Pakistanis living in Iran, with some also from the Shia Muslim communities living in various regions of Pakistan, as well as Shia Afghan refugees living in Pakistan. The Brigade had sent thousands of fighters to Syria, Iraq, and Yemen to fight against ISIL and other groups and factions under the support of Iran's Islamic Revolutionary Guard Corps.

It was formed and trained by the Iranian Revolutionary Guards and operates under their command. Initially tasked with defending the Sayyidah Zaynab Mosque, it entered frontlines since then across Syria, until 2024. Its dead are buried primarily in Iran. A minimum of 158 of their fighters had died in Syria as of March 2019 (based on publicly announced funeral services), excluding those killed in Israeli airstrikes. According to 2019 estimates, the total number of Pakistani fighters in the brigade barely exceeded 800.

Liwa Zainabiyoun's fighters also were limitedly involved in War in Iraq (2013–2017) and Yemeni civil war under the support of IRGC’s Quds Force as the Brigade is the part of Iran's Axis of Resistance.

== Background ==
=== Shia groups in Pakistan and their influence ===
The initial core of Liwa Zainabiyoun constituted of former members and fighters of Tehreek-e-Jafaria Pakistan (TJP) and its armed wing, Sipah-e-Muhammad Pakistan (SSP), former Shia Islamist political party and the ladder being a Shia Islamist armed militant organization in Pakistan, both of which were fought against the anti-Shia sectarian leadership of the banned terrorist groups Sipah-e-Sahaba and Lashkar-e-Jhangvi.

Tehreek-e-Jaffaria was a Shia political party, formed in the 1980s after the Iranian Revolution, whereas Sipah-e-Muhammad (which was accused of being TJP's armed wing) was an armed vigilante group and assassin network, formed in the 1990s in response to the rise of sectarian anti-Shia groups in Pakistan (such as Sipah-e-Sahaba and Lashkar-e-Jhangvi).

The roots of Tehreek-e-Jafaria and Sipah-e-Muhammad lie in the Iranian Revolution of 1979. In the aftermath of the revolution, several pro-Iran Shias in the small Pakistani city of Bhakkar, inspired by events in Iran, came together to form the "Jaffaria movement", known in Urdu as 'Tehreek-e-Jafaria'. The primary objective of this movement was to implement the Ja'fari school’s interpretation of Islamic Shariʿa (also referred to as Shariʿa law or Islamic law).

The organization was led by Arif Hussain al-Hussaini, who was a former student of Ayatollah Khomeini. Drawing inspiration from Iran, al-Hussaini sought to establish a sphere of influence by leveraging his connections within Pakistan, along with the favourable conditions and broader ideological climate created by the Iranian Revolution.

Within Pakistani madrasahs, Al-Hussaini promoted pro-Iranian revolutionary ideology through the madrasahs, encouraged students to pursue education in Iran, and worked to import Iran’s revolutionary model into Pakistan. He also aimed to spearhead efforts to transfer Iran’s revolutionary ideology into Pakistan.

Over time, the training systems and transnational networks which he helped create established proved effective, enabling Iran to recruit militants from Pakistan with relative ease. As a result, Al-Hussaini’s role in the formation of the Zainabiyoun brigade was central, despite not being direct, and his activities came to be regarded as a foundational factor in the emergence of the Zainabiyoun Brigade, which Iran had deployed in the Syrian civil war.

Both of Tehreek-e-Jafaria and Sipah-e-Muhammad had a strong presence in the Shia communities of Pakistan and were headquartered in Thokar Niaz Beg, a Shia majority town of Lahore, where they ran a "virtual state within a state" in the 1990s until the collapse of their presence there by 2007 or 2010.

During the Iran–Iraq War (1980–1988), many Shia Pakistanis (mainly TJP and SSP members) and Shia Indians volunteered to fight against Iraq for Iran. It is believed that these former volunteers later became high-ranking commanders in the Zainabiyoun brigade, similar to how former members of the Shia Afghan Tehran Eight and the Shia Afghan Abuzar Brigade became high-ranking members of Liwa Fatemiyoun.

=== Formation of Zainabiyoun ===
Later around 2012 or 2013 their former members joined and fought as part of the Shia Syrian Abu al-Fadhal al-Abbas brigade and later the Shia Afghan Liwa Fatemiyoun Brigade during the early years of the Syrian civil war, before forming the Zainabiyoun Brigade as a Pakistani Shiite volunteer group, which was formed soon after the Liwa Fatemiyoun Brigade, under the orders of IRGC's Quds Force.

The Zainabiyoun brigade was initially part of the Afghan Fatemiyoun brigade, but Pakistani fighters didn't really get along well with their Afghan counterparts, so the commander of the IRGC's Quds Force, Qasem Soleimani, decided to split them in two.

== Role in Syria ==
According to news sources affiliated with the IRGC, the group was founded in Syria and Iraq during the rise of Anti-Shia sectarian attacks by Salafi Jihadist organizations al-Qaeda and ISIL in Arab spring unrest and it officially started the armed operations late in 2014 especially in Syrian civil war to support Syrian government forces against the ISIL for targeting holy sites of Shia Muslims in Syria.

According to sources affiliated with the IRGC, its official purpose was to defend the Sayyidah Zaynab Mosque in the town of Sayyidah Zaynab (the shrine of Zaynab bint Ali, sister of Imam Hussain and granddaughter of the Islamic prophet Muhammad) and other Shia holy sites in Syria and Iraq and to protect IRGC interests in Iran–Saudi Arabia proxy conflict also in Iran–Israel proxy conflict. It had operated primarily in Damascus, Aleppo and other regions of Syria defending holy sites from ISIL until 2024.

In combat, Zainabiyoun was designated as a striking force.

Following the elimination of ISIS, Iranian-allied militias have occupied Abu Kamal and its countryside since late 2017. Since the end of 2017, the Iraqi Popular Mobilization Forces, had control of the al-Qa'im border crossing, while Hezbollah and the Haidariyoun, Fatemiyoun and Zainabiyoun militias had control of Mayadin, west of Abu Kamal, both on the south bank of the Euphrates River while the Syrian Democratic Forces (SDF) had control of the north bank.

On the 25th of February 2021, a contingent of Zainabiyoun fighters were sent to Kuweires Military Airport in Aleppo from the Homs countryside, with support from Hezbollah, in order to reinforce Syrian regime troops.

By 2024 there were still at least 2,500 to 5,000 fighters of both Zainabiyoun and Fatemiyoun in Syria.

Following the Fall of the Assad regime, its fighters had moved to Iraq, after Iran and Russia withdrew their forces from Syria.

== Recruitment and training ==
The Pakistani Shiite volunteers have been fighting in various conflicts since 2012 especially in Syrian civil war on pro-government side under the orders of IRGC against ISIL and its subgroups. In addition, large numbers of Shia Pakistani fighters have fought on the pro-government side as part of the Zeinabiyoun Brigade, which had up to 1,000 fighters in Syria. They originally fought in the Iraqi Abu Fadl al-Abbas Brigade and later the Afghan Liwa Fatemiyoun brigade, and only became numerous enough to warrant a distinct brigade in either late 2014 or early 2015. After arriving in Damascus, Pakistani fighters were often transferred to the Shibani camp just west of the city in order to receive their respective assignments.

Pakistani Zainabiyoun fighters tend to be more educated than their Afghan Fatemiyoun counterparts. This not only due to Pakistani fighters being more proficient in multiple languages, but also due to a large number of Zainabiyoun fighters being religious students trying to pursue higher education in Iran or educated political refugees escaping persecution, while Fatemiyoun fighters tend to be poor economic migrants, or war-escaping refugees and asylum-seekers.

=== Origins of fighters ===
Some of the fighters are Hazaras and Balochis (mainly from Quetta) while others are Pashtuns (mainly from Parachinar, Kurram, Khyber Pakhtunkhwa), Punjabis (mainly from Sahiwal, as well as Lahore in Punjab, mostly from Thokar Niaz Beg), Gilgitis and Baltis from Skardu, Gilgit-Baltistan, Karachans/Karachites (including Muhajirs, Pashtuns, Sindhis, and others) from Karachi, Sindhis from Sindh, and Kashmiris from Azad Kashmir. Like other Shiite foreign brigades in Syria, it is funded, trained, and overseen by the IRGC.

=== Recruitment conditions, pay, salary, and benefits ===
According to one source, Iran had offered the fighters a financial incentive in the form of a monthly salary of $500–700, nearly half of what most Pakistanis earned in a year. As per another source, according to the Zainabiyoun Facebook page, volunteers must be between 18 and 35 years of age and physically fit. They were offered up to Rs.120,000 ($1200) as a monthly salary with 15 days of holidays after three months. While another source claims that Pakistani migrants were offered citizenship, jobs, and a steady income for themselves and their families, and thus were made to feel obliged to agree to fight on conditions that Iran imposed on them. Otherwise, would face deportation. This source also claimed that Pakistani fighters were offered an average monthly salary of around 120,000 rupees ($700–750) in return for fighting under given conditions and were even promised 15-day holidays after three months, according to this other source. The IRGC had also been reported to pay fighters about $500 per month, by another source. According to Pakistani counter-insurgency officials, fighters recruited, by pro-Iran groups in Pakistan, for the war in Syria were being paid Rs.60,000 ($573) to Rs.110,000 ($1,050) per month.

== Losses of volunteer fighters ==
In 2019, the U.S. State Department claimed that the over 158 Pakistani national fighters of Iranian-backed Zainabiyoun Brigade were killed in Syria between January 2012 and August 2018.

On 9 April 2015, seven fighters were killed defending the Imam Hasan Mosque in Damascus and were buried in Qom, Iran. In March 2016, six fighters who were killed defending the Imam Reza shrine were also buried in Qom. On 23 April, five more fighters were killed.

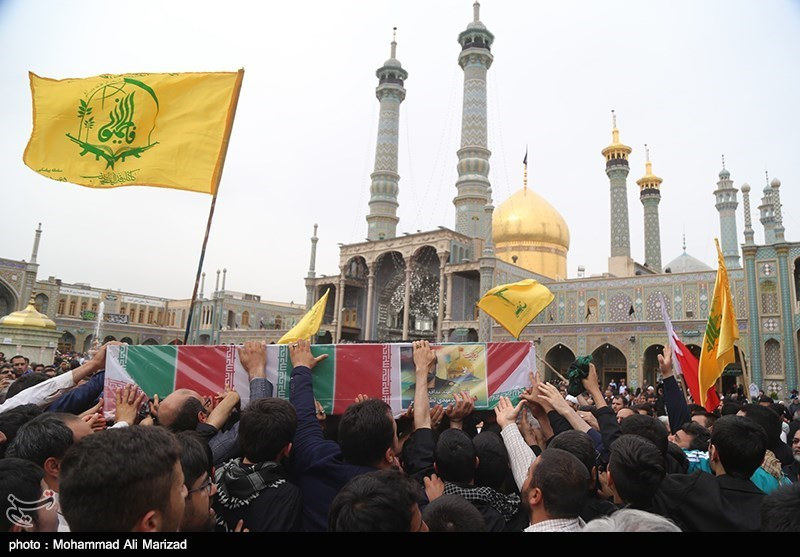
Funeral for pro-Iran fighters in Qom who were killed fighting in Syria. Zainabiyoun's flag can be seen in back to the centre

An estimated 70 fighters were killed between November 2014 and March 2016.

On the 10th November 2016, funeral ceremonies were held in Qom, Iran, for 9 Zainabiyoun fighters who were killed in Aleppo.

During the Aleppo offensive (November–December 2016), 10 Zainabiyoun fighters had been killed and many more had been wounded.

In February 2018, the brigade was involved in the Battle of Khasham along with Russian Wagner Group and Interbrigades against the US special forces and the US-backed Syrian Democratic Forces and lost many fighters.

It has been reported that more than 1,000 Iran-backed fighters from Zainabiyoun, Fatemiyoun, Hezbollah, and from other Iran-backed Shia groups had been killed from 2011 to 2016. This estimate rose to roughly 2,400 in 2018.

In 2020 the group, along with other Iran-backed Militias suffered heavy casualties fighting against Türkiye in the Northwestern Syria offensive (December 2019 – March 2020) in Idlib governorate as part of Türkiye's Operation Spring Shield.

During the 2024 Syrian opposition offensives, it was reported that 25 pro-Assad/Iran-backed militiamen were killed during the clashes with at least 15 of them being non-Syrian militiamen. These fighters were likely the last members of Hezbollah, Zanabiyoun, and Fatemiyoun, to have died in Syria before their withdrawal.

The families of fallen fighters are granted residency in Iran along with free pilgrimage to Shia Holy Shrines (Ziyarat), at the expense of the Iranian government. However, there are sometimes issues in this process.

== Presence outside Syria ==
=== Iraq ===
The brigade fought in Iraq against ISIL during the War in Iraq (2013–17) with other foreign Shia fighters to defend and protect holy sites and Iraqi people from the ISIL. After the fall of the Assad regime, hundreds of fighters from the Fatemiyoun and Zainabiyoun were warehoused inside complexes in the Al-Qa'im Bases and Camp Ashraf (also known as the Martyr Abu Munthadher al-Muhammadawi Camp) in Iraq's Diyala province by groups affiliated with the Popular Mobilization Forces and Islamic Resistance in Iraq.

=== Yemen ===
In 2019, Some media sources claim that the brigade is allegedly involved in Yemeni Civil War along with other foreign Shia fighters to fought against the Saudi Arabian-led intervention in Yemen and to support Houthis.

=== Pakistan ===
Flag of the Islamic Resistance of Pakistan mainly inspired from the flag of Sipah-e-Muhammad Pakistan and Islamic Revolutionary Guard Corps

In Pakistan, former members of the Zainabiyoun brigade have been actively involved in Parachinar's sectarian clashes along with local Shia Turi and Bangash tribes based in the city of Parachinar for the Protection of Shia Muslim community and to fight against the Anti-Shia banned sectarian terrorist groups such as Sipah-e-Sahaba, the Pakistani Taliban, the Islamic State – Khorasan Province and Lashkar-e-Jhangvi which had been targeting the Shia community of Parachinar in sectarian attacks. A major conflict was fought in 2007. The Sectarian violence in Pakistan has been become a serious issue from then onwards.

The Zainabiyoun brigade reportedly recruited many fighters from Parachinar, and has strong support base in Parachinar's Shia Muslim community especially among the Turi Tribe from Kurram Agency as well as the Shia community in Karachi and Lahore.

From 2020 to 2025, several former/retired members of the Zainabiyoun brigade, who had been linked to participating in sectarian violence and street crime in Karachi, were arrested on such charges by the CTD. Such cases used to be linked to or pinpointed on Sipah-e-Muhammad Pakistan.

The Zainabiyoun brigade's former Kashmiri fighters, have been reported to be active in Kashmir insurgency, fighting against Indian security forces (such as the Indian Army, Border Security Force, Central Armed Police Forces, Central Reserve Police Force, Indian National Security Guard, Rashtriya Rifles, Indian Jammu and Kashmir Police, etc.) either as part of different insurgent/militant groups.

== Reaction in Pakistan ==
In December 2015, a bomb killed 25 and injured over 30 in Parachinar, Khyber Pakhtunkhwa. The Deobandi terrorist group, Lashkar-e-Jhangvi, claimed responsibility and its official spokesman, Ali Abu Sufyan, said "We claim responsibility for the Eidgah Bazar, Parachinar bomb blast. It was a revenge of the crimes against the Muslims of Syria by Iran and Bashar al Assad," the group's spokesperson, Ali Abu Sufiyan said on the very same day as the attack. In a statement, the group warned of more attacks “if the people in Parachinar did not stop sending people to take part in Syrian war”.

The government of Pakistan officially had denied the presence of Pakistani fighters in Syria, and has been reluctant to take back members of the brigade caught in Syria.

Around 2013 or 14 Following the reports of presence of Pakistani fighters of Zainabiyoun brigade in Syria, the Pakistani Taliban claimed that they have set up camps and sent hundreds of fighters to Syria to fight alongside Islamist-Jihadist groups opposed to Bashar al-Assad such as Al-Nusra Front, Ahrar al-Sham and Ansar al-Tawhid in an effort to strengthen ties with Al-Qaeda against the government of Pakistan in the Khyber Pakhtunkhwa Insurgency.

In the 2024 Syrian opposition offensives and the fall of the Assad regime, many propaganda videos and pictures circulated online from Syria of a suspected Pakistani or Afghan Jihadist fighter speaking Pashto congratulating the Syrian rebels in person and saying things such as “jihad against the Rafidhis” and “I will kill every Shia I find”. They also referred to Bashar al-Assad's regime as “Rafidhi” and “apostate". It is believed that these individuals are Afghans and Pakistanis who are part of the TTP and had been fighting against Bashar Al-Assad's regime and Iran-backed militias in Syria from as far back as 2013.

Pakistani authorities describe it as a major security threat for the country due to returning of Pakistani Taliban and Liwa Zainabiyoun brigade militiamen, who have fought in Syrian civil war. Since 2013, the Pakistani Government had dispatched its intelligence chiefs to Tehran, Kabul, Istanbul and Damascus to work out a way forward on security concerns united in a bloc against terror threats and further challenges in an efforts for peace, stability and progress in the region, in order to suppress a new expected wave of Sectarian violence in Pakistan and Insurgency in Khyber Pakhtunkhwa as return of Pakistani and Afghan militiamen from Syria following the fall of the Assad regime.

== Disappearance and death of the brigade commander ==
In 2017, the leader of Zainabiyoun, Saqib Haider Karbalai went missing while fighting alongside Syrian government forces during the Hama offensive (March–April 2017). The IRGC-affiliated Tasnim News Agency reported his death in 2019, claiming that the body of Haider was transferred to Tehran two years after he was killed in the Syrian city of Hama by ISIS terrorists. According to Tasnim News Agency, the identity of the commander of the Zainabiyoun Brigade was identified after a DNA test, and he was transferred to Tehran where he was to be buried. The news agency also reported that "his body has no head and no arms" and that he was killed in action in April 2017 in the Tal Turabi area in the Hama Governorate, during the offensive.

== Relationship with the Axis of Resistance ==
According to researcher Phillip Smyth, Liwa Fatemiyoun, Liwa Zainabiyoun and Hezbollah Afghanistan were originally different groups, but showed such great overlap in ideology and membership by 2014 that they had become "incorporated". In contrast, researcher Oved Lobel continued to regard Liwa Fatemiyoun and Hezbollah Afghanistan as separate organizations in 2018, though groups were part of Iran's "regional proxy network". Other sources such as Jihad Intel and Arab News have treated the militas as the same organization. Researcher Michael Robillard called Liwa Fatemiyoun a "branch of Hezbollah Afghanistan". Iran is also known to have established branches of Hezbollah in Afghanistan and Pakistan, with several pro-Iranian groups operating in both countries by the Soviet–Afghan War.

On the one-year death anniversary of Hassan Nasrullah and Hashem Safieddine, fighters from Hezbollah, the Popular Mobilization Forces (Kata’ib Hezbollah), Zainabiyoun, Fatemiyoun, Heydariyoun, Hosseiniyoun participated in mourning their deaths, in the city of Qom.

== Role in Iran–Israel proxy conflict ==
Flag of the group

Both the Zainabiyoun and Fatmiyoun Brigades are supported by Iran's Islamic Revolutionary Guard Corps (IRGC) and are important parts of the Iranian government's construct which uses such proxy groups as a core strategy for deterrence across the region, which includes its main proxy Hezbollah and its allies: Kata'ib Hezbollah, Kata'ib Sayyid al-Shuhada, Hezbollah Al-Nujaba, Ansar Allah (popularly known as the Houthis) and Hamas have been a part of Iran's strategy of deterrence from engaging in a conventional full-scale conflict with Israel and its Arab allies despite the limited employment of both the Zainabiyoun and Fatmiyoun brigades composed of Pakistani and Afghan nationals have successfully demonstrated Iran's capability to mobilize Shia ecosystems not only in the Middle East but on its own borders and further afield during the Israel—Hezbollah war and Gaza war. These resistance forces of Pakistanis and Afghans, formerly based in Syria, are expected to carry out direct attacks on Israel while operating as a part of Hezbollah, the Islamic Resistance in Iraq or the Houthis. Iran's military strategy in Lebanon and Iraq is based on the concept of liberation of State of Palestine and elimination of Zionist, State of Israel including forward defense. It entails engaging adversaries beyond its own territory to prevent threats from reaching its border. A key pillar of this strategy is a network of Iran's IRGC-linked armed groups across the region known as the Axis of Resistance. This includes Hezbollah in Lebanon various Shitte Militias in Iraq, Yemen and Iran sponsored militias in Syria as well as the Palestinian resistance forces specifically Hamas, Palestinian Islamic Jihad and their subgroups in the Palestinian territories. Reportedly, Iran supports 20 or more groups/organizations directly or indirectly all over world, strategically planned and revived by the former IRGC officer Qasem Solemani, described as a "genius of asymmetric warfare", in order to counter the imperialist influence and interests of the United States, Israel and their allies. Former Mossad director Yossi Cohen said Soleimani's strategies had "personally tightened a noose around Israel's neck".

After the United States and Israel attacked Iran in June 2025 and again in February 2026, the group pledged its support for Iran and its willingness to fight against Israeli and American interests in the Middle East. The group said in a statement, "Your blood is our blood. Our hearts, souls, and minds stand with you," and also that "the people of Pakistan stand shoulder to shoulder with you." The group issued a warning, similar other groups in the Axis of Resistance. It said that any direct involvement by the United States in a war or conflict with Iran, or that if any harm reaches, or is done to the Iranian Supreme Leader, Syed Ali Khamenei, it would provoke a response worldwide that will targeting American assets, especially in West Asia and Pakistan. The statement concluded with "Signed in our blood, the soldiers of Hajj Qassem Soleimani."

== Designation as a terrorist organization and ban ==
Liwa Zainabiyoun is designated as a terrorist organization by the U.S. State Department in 2019.

In 2024, the Interior Ministry of Pakistan banned the Zainabiyoun Brigade.

== Unsuccessful raid against retired brigade commander ==
On 14 August 2025, Police carried out an unsuccessful surprise raid on the house of the former chief commander of the Zainabiyoun brigade, Abid Hussain Turi also known as Tehran Turi, in Parachinar in order to arrest him for his suspected involvement in Kurram district's sectarian violence between Shia Sunni tribes and militias. During the raid, unknown gunmen opened fire on police from a hidden position outside the house killing the additional station house officer (SHO) Qaiser Hussain, of the Wozha Police Station on the spot, and leaving his colleagues injured whiling also causing significant damage to the police vehicles. Due to gunfire and attempted arrest, protests and unrest erupted in the surrounding area of Tehran Turi's house against the police for attempting to arrest him. Due to the intense situation, the government authorities immediately ordered the police to withdraw from the area in order to avoid further violence. On the same day, at least five police personnel were killed and several others injured in multiple attacks at various different locations in Khyber Pakhtunkhwa.

== See also ==
- Foreign fighters in the Syrian civil war
- Liwa Fatemiyoun
- List of armed groups in the Syrian Civil War
- Holy Shrine Defender
- Sipah-e-Muhammad Pakistan
- Tehreek-e-Jafaria (Pakistan)
- Hüseynçilər

== Works cited ==
- Zaidi, Manzar. "The Iran-Backed Zainabiyoun Brigade: A Pakistani Shiite Militia".
- "UNHCR Web Archive". webarchive.archive.unhcr.org.
- The Zeynabiyoun Brigade (PDF).
- "As 50,000 Pakistani Shi'ite Pilgrims Go Missing In Iraq, Concern Deepens Over Iran's Continuing Recruitment Of Pakistani Shi'ites In Zainabiyoun Brigade To Fight In The Arab World". MEMRI.
- "Syria's Idlib under siege by foreign terrorists". www.aa.com.tr.
- Rehman, Zia Ur. "Pakistan's Shia mercenaries return from Syria, posing a security threat". Pakistan's Shia mercenaries return from Syria, posing a security threat.
- "ANALYSIS - Iran-backed Zainabiyoun Brigade could become Pakistan's new national security problem". www.aa.com.tr.
- "Iran buries Afghan, Pakistani fighters killed in Syria". www.aa.com.tr.
- "Pakistan says probing pro-India malware 'attacks'". www.aa.com.tr.
