= 2023 Kurram conflict =

Part of the War in North-West Pakistan and Sectarian violence in Pakistan

2023 District Kurram Parachinar conflict
- Part of the War in North-West Pakistan and Sectarian violence in Pakistan
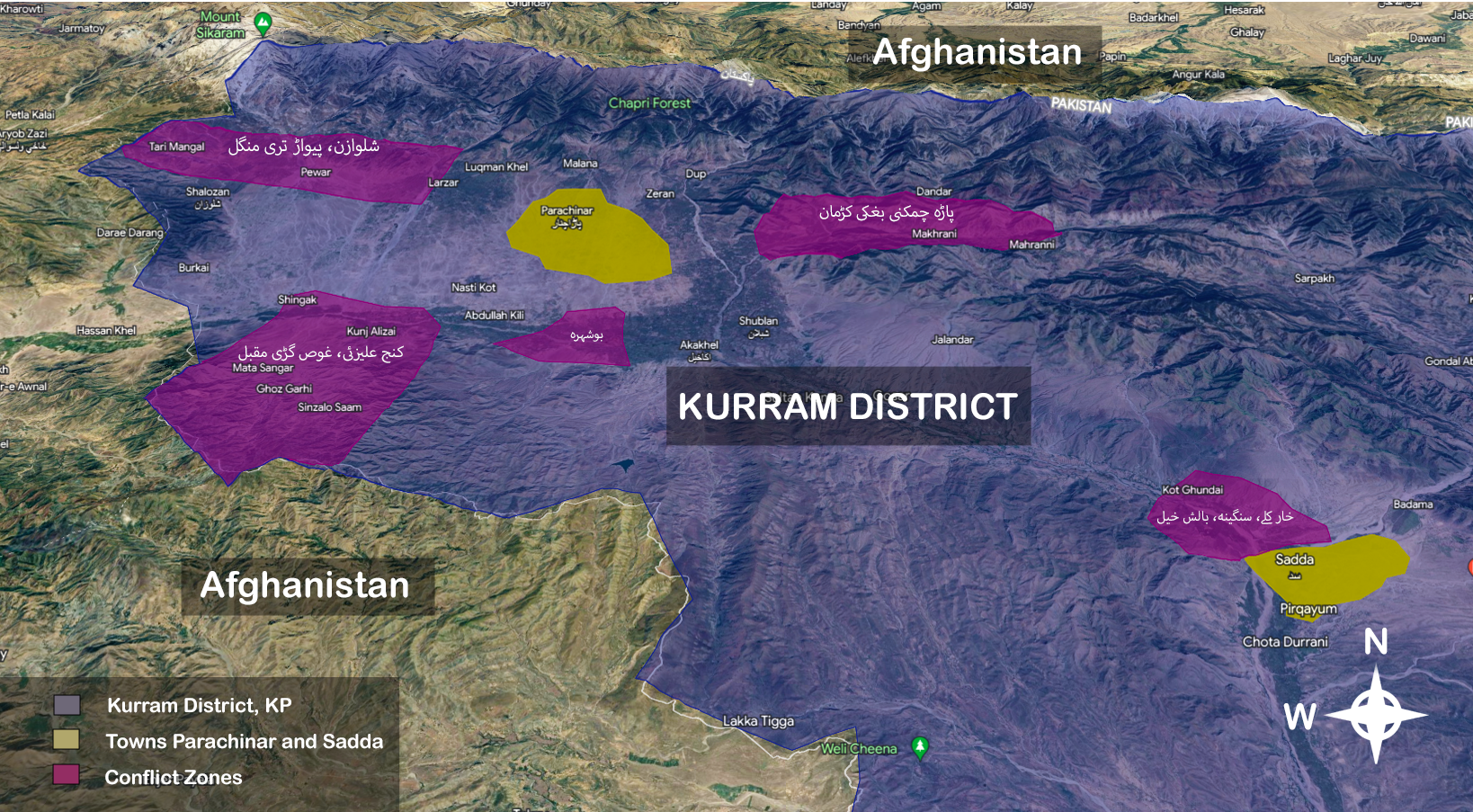
- Map of 2023 Kurram District Conflict Zones
Date	4 May 2023 – 13 July 2023 (2 months, 1 week and 2 days)
Location	Kurram District, Khyber Pakhtunkhwa, Pakistan
Result	Ceasefire: Clashes extinguished by 13 July 2023, In all the five places where the clashes between the parties have stopped after the ceasefire.; Rival tribes agree on a ceasefire for one year.

Belligerents
Sunni Militants: Local Sunni Tribesmen; Pakistani Taliban; Sipah-e-Sahaba; Lashkar-e-Jhangvi	Shia Militants: Local Shia Tribesmen; Liwa Zainabiyoun; Sipah-e Muhammad; Tehreek-e-Jafaria

Casualties and losses
121 killed	213 killed
- 34 killed 73 injured

The 2023 Kurram conflict (Pashto: د کرم جنګ) was a conflict that started as a land dispute which turned into a series of sectarian clashes that took place in the Kurram District of Khyber Pakhtunkhwa, Pakistan near the Durand Line, from May to July 2023.

== Background ==
The conflict began on May 4, 2023, when a school shooting took place at a high school in Tari Mangal, killing seven people, including five teachers and two labors, According to Deputy Commissioner Saiful Islam, the teacher who died in the initial attack was a Sunni Muslim, while those targeted in the subsequent shooting at the school were Shia Muslims, as reported by Reuters.

== Conflict ==
On July 7, 2023, the conflict turned into war when the clashes erupted between Shia and Sunni tribes in Boshera village after construction on disputed land. The clashes quickly spread to other parts of the district. The town of Parachinar was attacked by missiles from three sides for several days, in which many children were injured, while the town of Sada was also targeted by missiles from unknown places.

== Aftermath ==
The clashes resulted in the deaths of at least 13 people and the injuries of 74 others. The Pakistani government deployed troops to the area to try to restore order, and a one-year ceasefire was brokered with the help of a local jirga, and clashes end in all parts of the district on July 13, 2023.

== See also ==
- 2007 Kurram Agency conflict
- 2023 Parachinar school shooting
- 2024 Kurram massacre
- 2024 Kurram conflict
- Turi (Pashtun tribe)
