= Kurram conflict =

The term "Kurram conflict" could be referring to:

- 2007 Kurram Agency conflict
- 2023 Kurram conflict
- 2024 Kurram conflict
