= 2015 Parachinar bombing =

Terrorist incident in Pakistan

- Part of War in North-West Pakistan
- Location of Federally Administered Tribal Areas in Pakistan
- Location: Parachinar, Kurram Valley, Federally Administered Tribal Areas, Pakistan
- Date: 13 December 2015
- Target: Shia Muslims
- Deaths: 25
- Injuries: 62
- Victim: Shia Muslims
- Perpetrator: Lashkar-e-Jhangvi

A bombing occurred on 13 December 2015 at a clothes bazaar in Pakistan's Parachinar area in the Kurram Valley. It was not clear whether the bombing was a suicide attack or a remotely controlled detonation. The blast killed 25 people and another 62 were injured.

== See also ==
- 2008 Parachinar bombing
- 2013 Parachinar attack
- Terrorist incidents in Pakistan in 2015
- List of terrorist incidents, 2015
