= Pewar =

Pakistani village

- Village
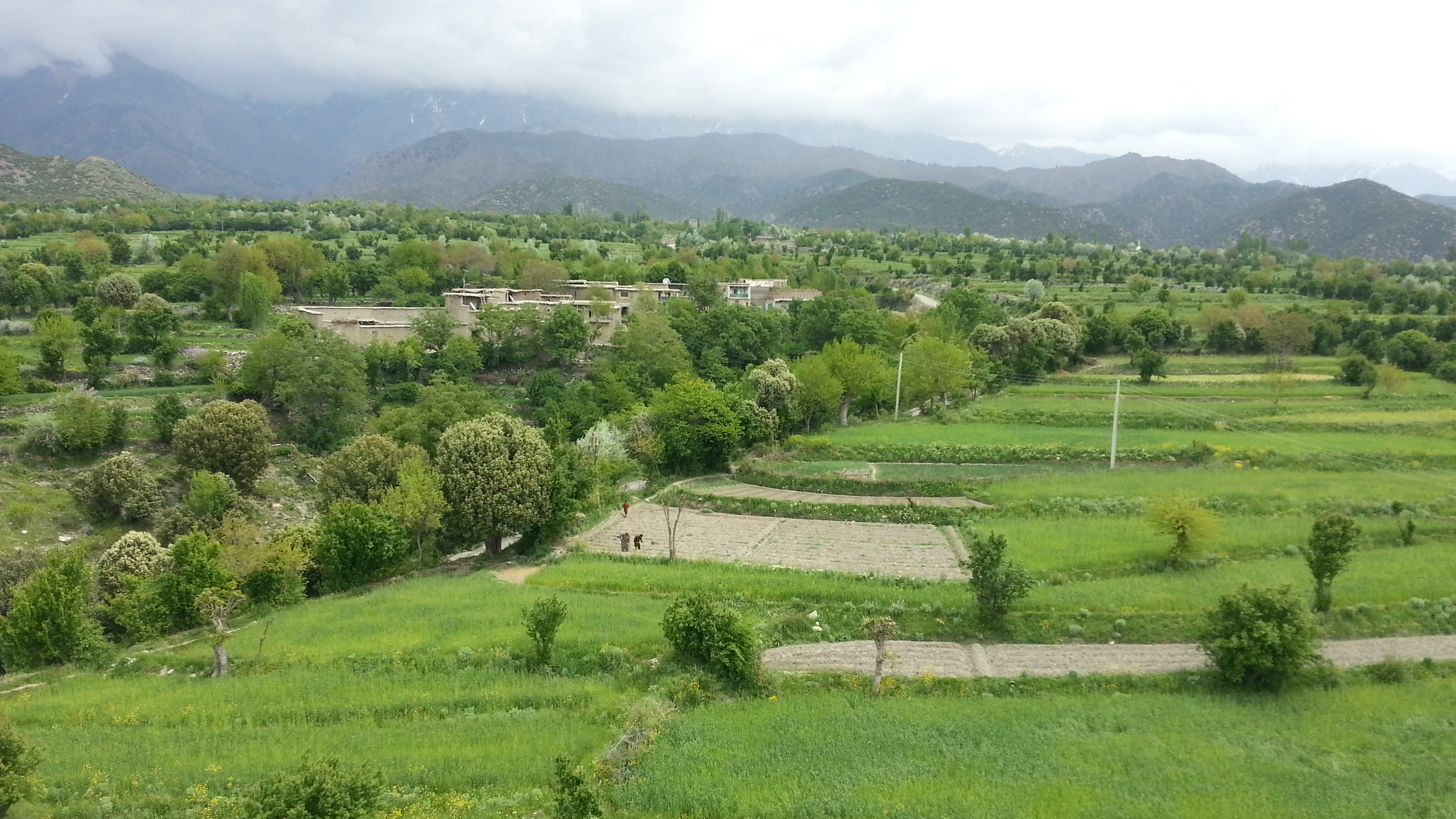
- Country: Pakistan
- Province: Khyber Pakhtunkhwa
- District: Kurram
- Time zone: UTC+5 (PST)
  - Summer (DST): UTC+6 (PST (DST))

Pewar is a village located 16 km from Parachinar, the capital city of Kurram District in Khyber Pakhtunkhwa, Pakistan. Situated on a narrow stretch of Pakistani territory south of Peshawar, Pewar borders Paktia Province in Afghanistan. It is the closest point in Pakistan to Kabul and lies near the Tora Bora region. The major tribes in Pewar and Parachinar include Turi, Bangash, Orakzai, Zazai, Mangal and Para Tsamkani. Pewar is renowned for its fresh fruits, vegetables, and scenic snowfall.

== History ==
The name Pewar may derive from the Pashto word pawar which mean one by one people come to protect that area which is located too close to the border with Afghanistan. The previous name, used for pawar was Tutki, which is still used by some Afghan people. The inhabitants of Tutki were called Tutkiwal.

Parachinar originated as a summer residence for nomadic tribes who wintered their livestock at lower altitudes, and the district had originally been a summer residence for Moghul emperors from Delhi. The Pewar region was part of Durrani empire before the Second Afghan War of 1878–79, but was not firmly annexed by the British until 1892. During the colonial era and 1947, Parachinar became a hill station for people from Peshawar; as it is relatively cool in the summer and very easy to reach from the plains despite its high altitude since there are no steep ascents on the route from Peshawar.

Because of its proximity to the border of Afghanistan, in recent years, the economy of Parachinar has been adversely affected, with tourism in steep decline.

== Climate ==
Pewar has a moderate humid subtropical climate with much higher rainfall and sownfall than most areas of Pakistan. Although the city's southeasterly aspect relative to the valley in which it is situated allows it to receive on occasions significant monsoon rainfall, the most frequent source of rain is western depressions and related thunderstorms. During the winter, snowfall is common, and frosts occur on most mornings. Snow closes the Peiwar Pass, located on the Paktia border just over 20 km west of Parachinar, for up to five months per year. Pewar is 16:km from Parachinar. Parachinar is the main city of kurram agency FATA.

Climate data for Pewar
Month	Jan	Feb	Mar	Apr	May	Jun	Jul	Aug	Sep	Oct	Nov	Dec	Year
Record high °C (°F)	18.6 (65.5)	18.2 (64.8)	29.0 (84.2)	20.7 (69.3)	25.4 (77.7)	30.6 (87.1)	28.4 (83.1)	26.6 (79.9)	29.2 (84.6)	28.2 (82.8)	26.3 (79.3)	20.0 (68.0)	30.6 (87.1)
Mean daily maximum °C (°F)	9.9 (49.8)	10.4 (50.7)	14.9 (58.8)	21.3 (70.3)	26.6 (79.9)	30.7 (87.3)	29.6 (85.3)	28.4 (83.1)	27.1 (80.8)	23.2 (73.8)	18.2 (64.8)	12.7 (54.9)	21.1 (70.0)
Daily mean °C (°F)	4.2 (39.6)	4.8 (40.6)	9.6 (49.3)	15.6 (60.1)	20.3 (68.5)	24.5 (76.1)	24.5 (76.1)	23.5 (74.3)	21.3 (70.3)	16.7 (62.1)	11.5 (52.7)	6.7 (44.1)	15.3 (59.5)
Mean daily minimum °C (°F)	−1.6 (29.1)	−0.8 (30.6)	4.2 (39.6)	9.9 (49.8)	14.1 (57.4)	18.3 (64.9)	19.5 (67.1)	18.5 (65.3)	15.6 (60.1)	10.2 (50.4)	5.0 (41.0)	0.7 (33.3)	9.47 (49.05)
Record low °C (°F)	−15 (5)	−11.2 (11.8)	−6.6 (20.1)	1.7 (35.1)	5.2 (41.4)	8.0 (46.4)	13.3 (55.9)	12.8 (55.0)	6.1 (43.0)	3.4 (38.1)	−2.0 (28.4)	−7.2 (19.0)	−15 (5)
Average precipitation mm (inches)	44.9 (1.77)	73.3 (2.89)	127.3 (5.01)	87.6 (3.45)	65.8 (2.59)	44.8 (1.76)	107.1 (4.22)	102.2 (4.02)	55.1 (2.17)	22.4 (0.88)	17.4 (0.69)	33.8 (1.33)	781.7 (30.78)
Mean monthly sunshine hours	214.5	198.8	209.4	233.5	292.1	297.3	285.7	280.6	270.2	284.3	260.1	199.2	3,025.7
Source: NOAA (1971-1990)

== Schools ==
Notable schools in Pewar are Government high school Pewar, Government girls high school Pewar, Pewar Children Academy and Community Model high school.

== See also ==
- Parachinar Airport
- List of airports in Pakistan
- Battle of Tora Bora
- Kurram Agency War April 2007
- Tari Mangal
