= Safed Koh =

Mountain range in eastern Afghanistan and northern Pakistan

- Spin Ghar
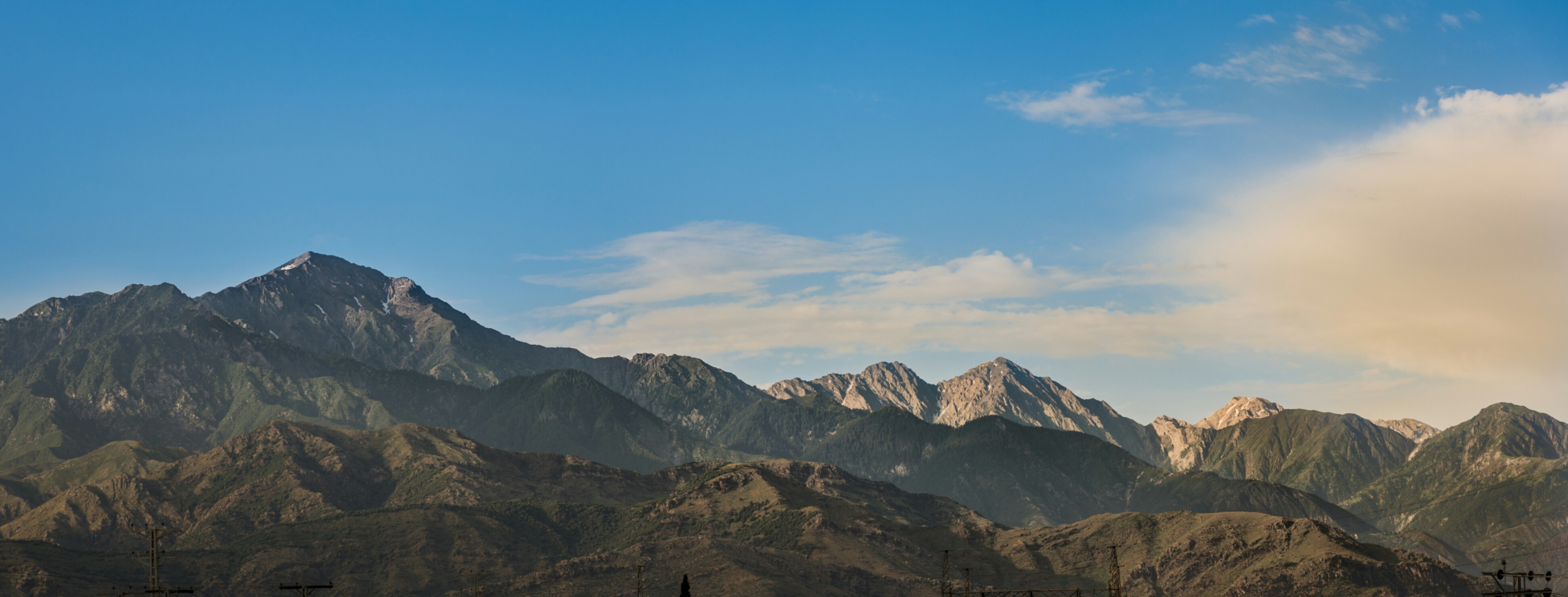

Highest point
- Peak: Mount Sikaram, Afghanistan–Pakistan Border
- Elevation: 4,755 m (15,600 ft)
- Coordinates: 33°58′N 70°22′E

Naming
- Native name: سفیدکوه (Dari); سپین غر (Pashto); سفید پہاڑ (Urdu)

Geography
- Location within Afghanistan
- Countries: Afghanistan; Pakistan
- Provinces: Nangarhar, Logar, Paktia in Afghanistan; Khyber Pakhtunkhwa in Pakistan

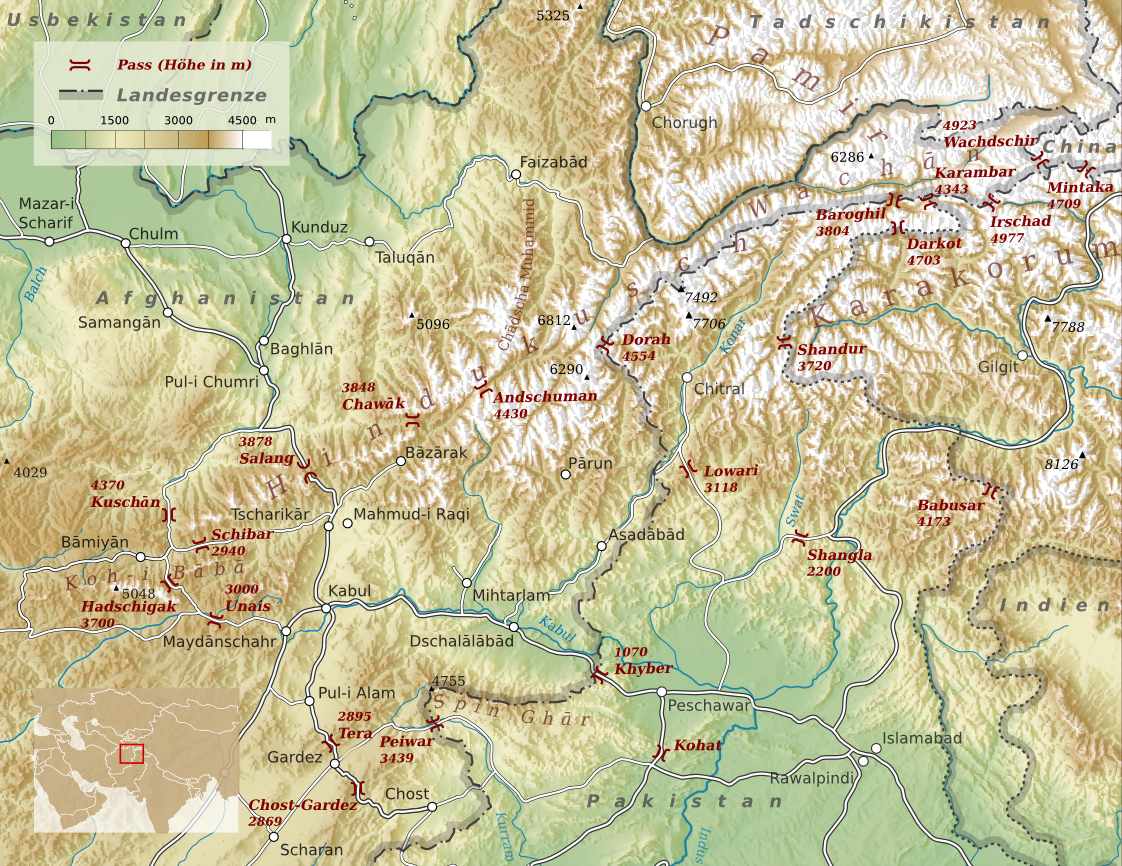
Map of northeastern Afghanistan and northwestern Pakistan with Spin Ghar labelled in the bottom

Safed Koh, (Note: Dari: سلسله سفید کوه, romanized: Silsila-yi Safēd Kōh [sɪl.sɪ.lá‿jɪ sä.féːd̪ koː(ʱ)]) also known as Spin Ghar, (Note: Pashto: سپين غر, romanized: Spin Ğar [spin ɣäɾ]) is a mountain range to the south of the Hindu Kush. It stretches from eastern Afghanistan to northwestern Pakistan, and forms a natural border between the two countries.

Its highest peak is Mount Sikaram on the Afghanistan–Pakistan border, which towers above all surrounding hills to 4,755 m (15,600 ft) above mean sea level.

== Etymology ==
The Pashto "Spīn Ghar" and Dari Persian 'Safēd Kōh' both literally mean 'White Mountains'.

== Geography ==
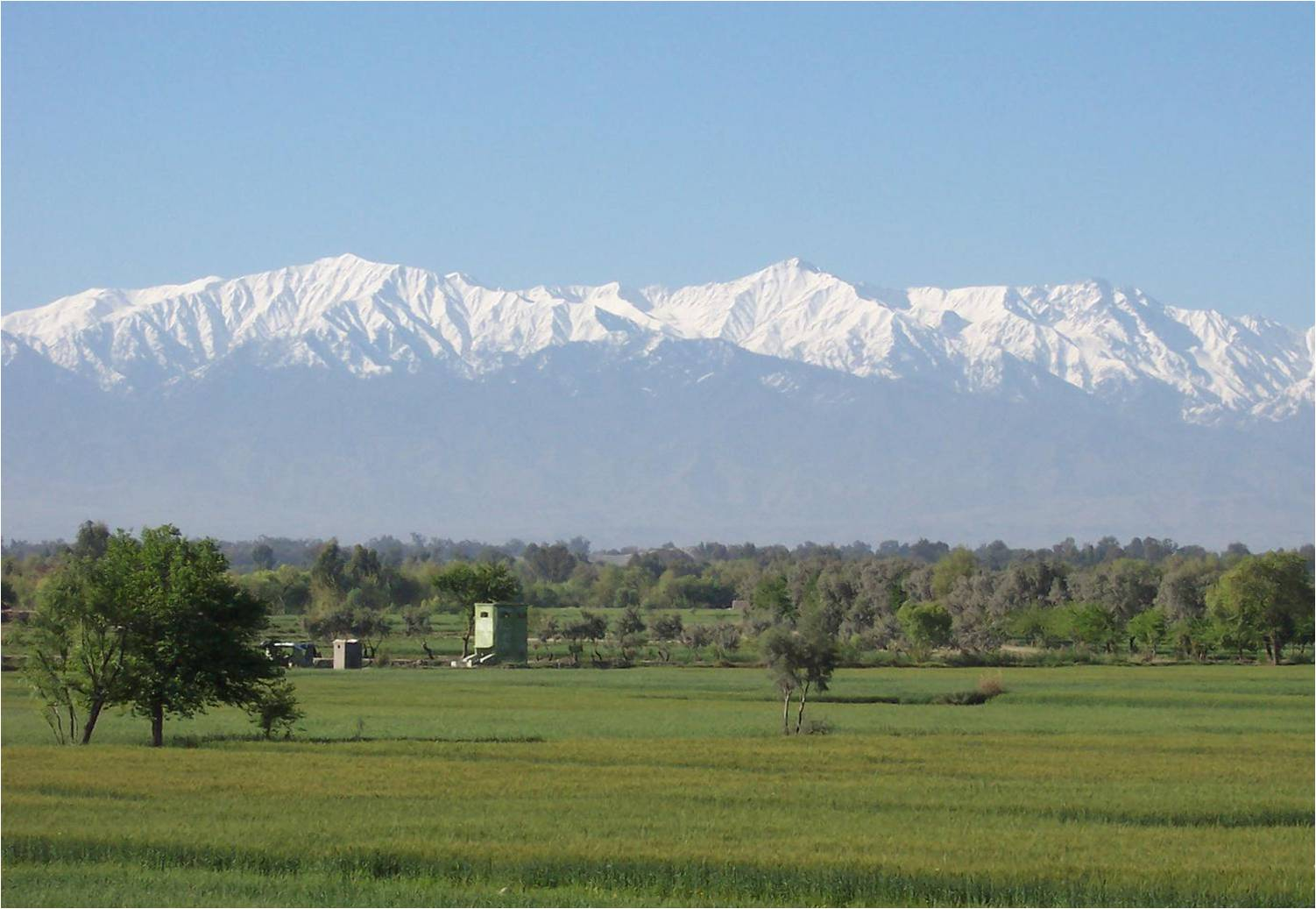
The range as viewed from Khogyani District, Afghanistan

The range extends from the Peshawar Valley in Pakistan in the east about 160 kilometers west to the Logar Valley in Afghanistan. The Kabul River cuts a narrow trough through Safed Koh to flow eastward into the Indus River. The range connects directly with the Shandur Pass offshoot of the Hindu Kush mountain system.

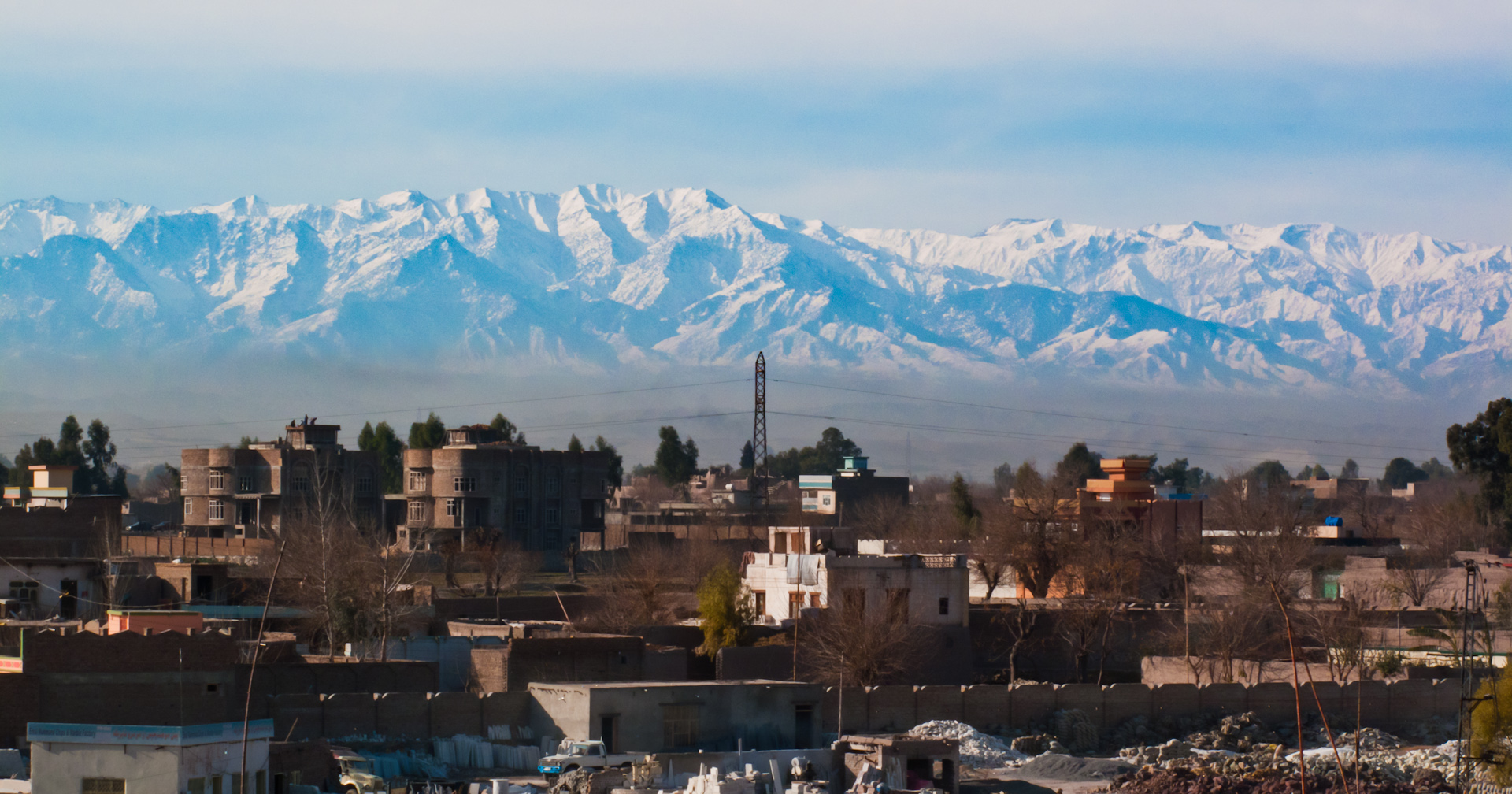
The range as seen from Jalalabad, Afghanistan

The highest peak is Mount Sikaram, near the Pakistani town of Parachinar in the Kurram Valley. From here it passes to Tari Mangal, Pewar, Alizai, Khewas, Shilawzan, Luqman Khel, Maikay, Chappri Rest House, Zeran, and Landi Kotal Tehsil. The Safed Koh mountains form the watershed between the river systems of the Kabul and Kurram.

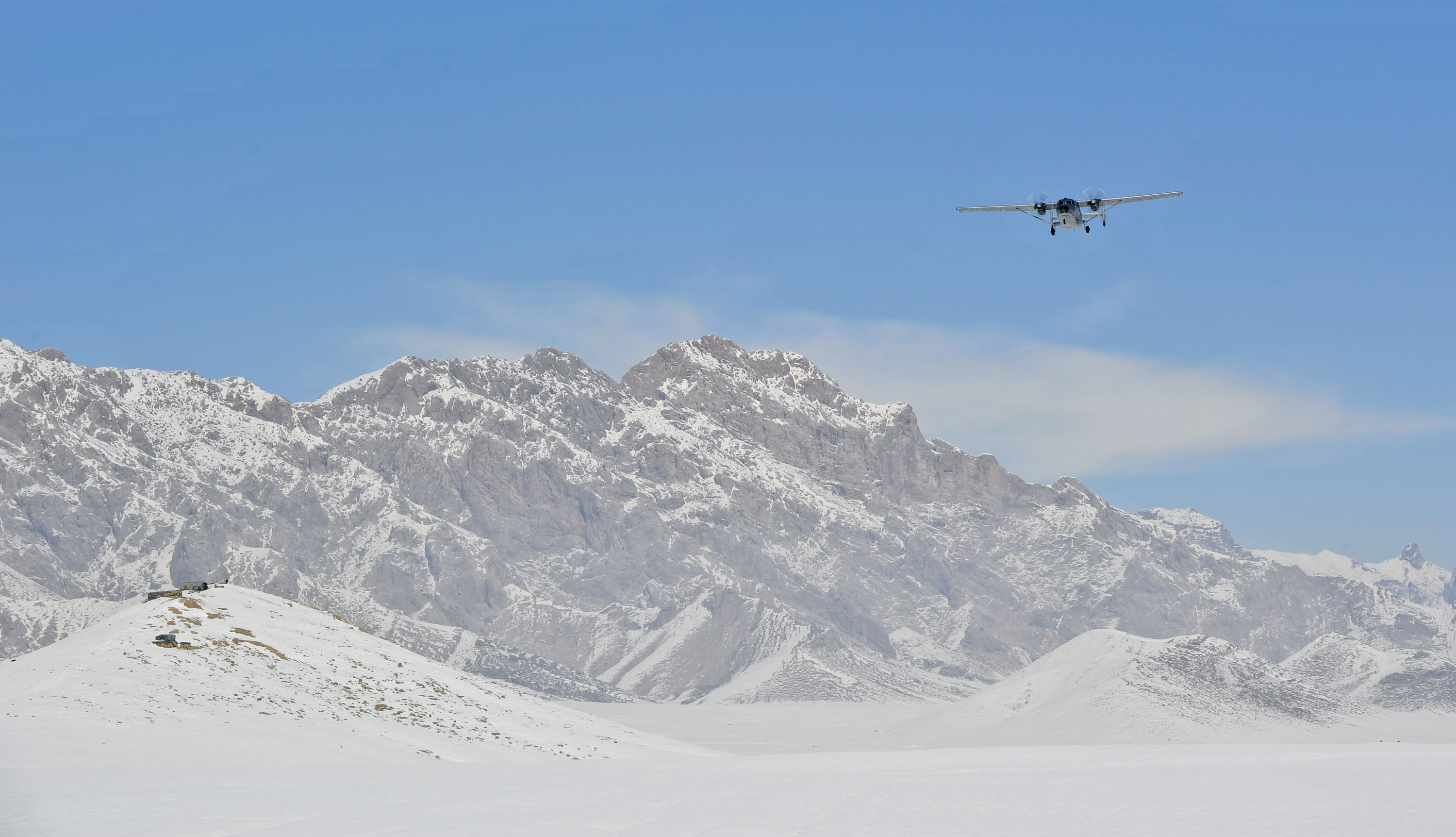
US aircraft flying by the mountains in Afghanistan

The closest cities to Safed Koh are Jalalabad to the north; Gardez to the west; and Khost, and Parachinar in Pakistan to the south.

The range between Herat in the west and Chaghcharan in the east is called Paropamisus Mountains.

== Geology ==
The Safed Koh mountains are part of the western rim that separates the Indian subcontinent from the Eurasian Plate.

The base of the mountains consists of Proterozoic gneisses and granites with admixtures of gabbros, mafic metavolcanic rocks, marble and migmatites. On the summit there are cirque glaciers, some of which are filled with scree.

On the southern flank of the Sikaram Sar follow from 2500 m from bottom to top: alluvial soils in valleys, limestone and dolomite up to 4000 m, an intermediate zone of slate at 4000 m, above crystalline rock.

== Fauna ==
A 20,000 hectare biotope in the southwest of Safed Koh is listed as an important bird area in Afghanistan. The lower hills are mostly barren and treeless, but pine grows on the main mountains that form the East Afghan montane conifer forests.

=== Agriculture and forestry ===
Above the nearly barren lower slopes, forests of pine and deodar cedar thrived on the main range, but devastation during the Afghan civil wars reduced timber resources. The valleys still support some agriculture.

The rivers of Safed Koh serve the irrigation of the fields in the densely populated river valleys, which allows the pelvis of Jalalabad multiple harvests. Wheat, maize, various types of vegetables (onions, green beans, okra, tomatoes, etc.), cotton, opium poppies, lemons, sugar cane, and olives are also grown around Jalalabad. The Bara high valley in the southeast of the range is one of the most intensively used agricultural areas of the Pakistani tribal areas under Khyber Pakhtunkhwa. Older reports speak of rich orchards in the valleys of Safed Koh with mulberry and pomegranate trees.

Wood from the eastern Afghan forests has been exported mainly to Pakistan since the 19th century, and in increasingly irresponsible quantities, so that Afghanistan imposed a complete export ban in 1975, which smugglers circumvented. In addition to the actual forestry there is or was a collection economy for pistachio nuts and the edible seeds of Pinus gerardiana.

== Passes ==
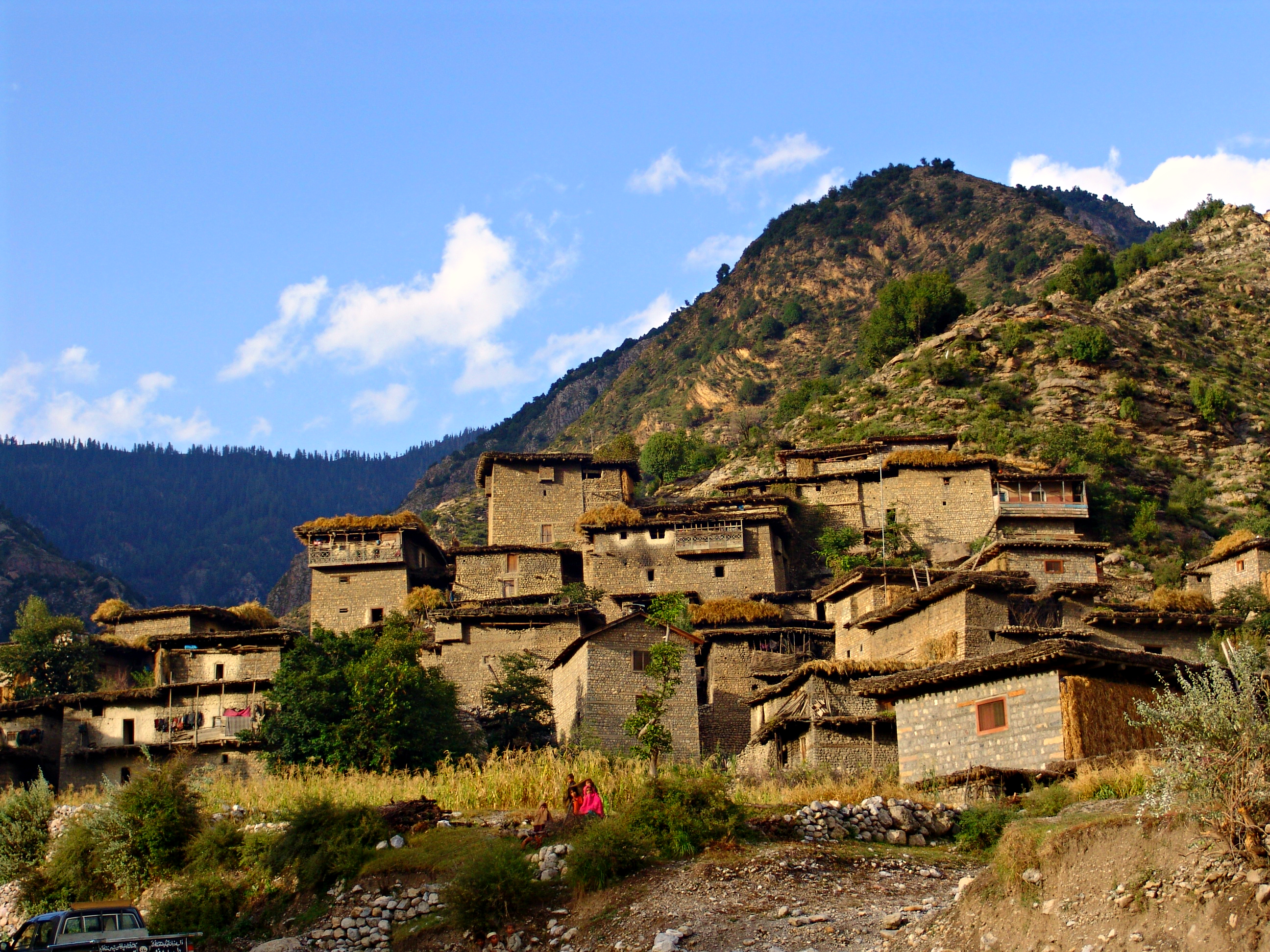
Tari Mangal, Kurram District, Pakistan, below the Peiwar Pass

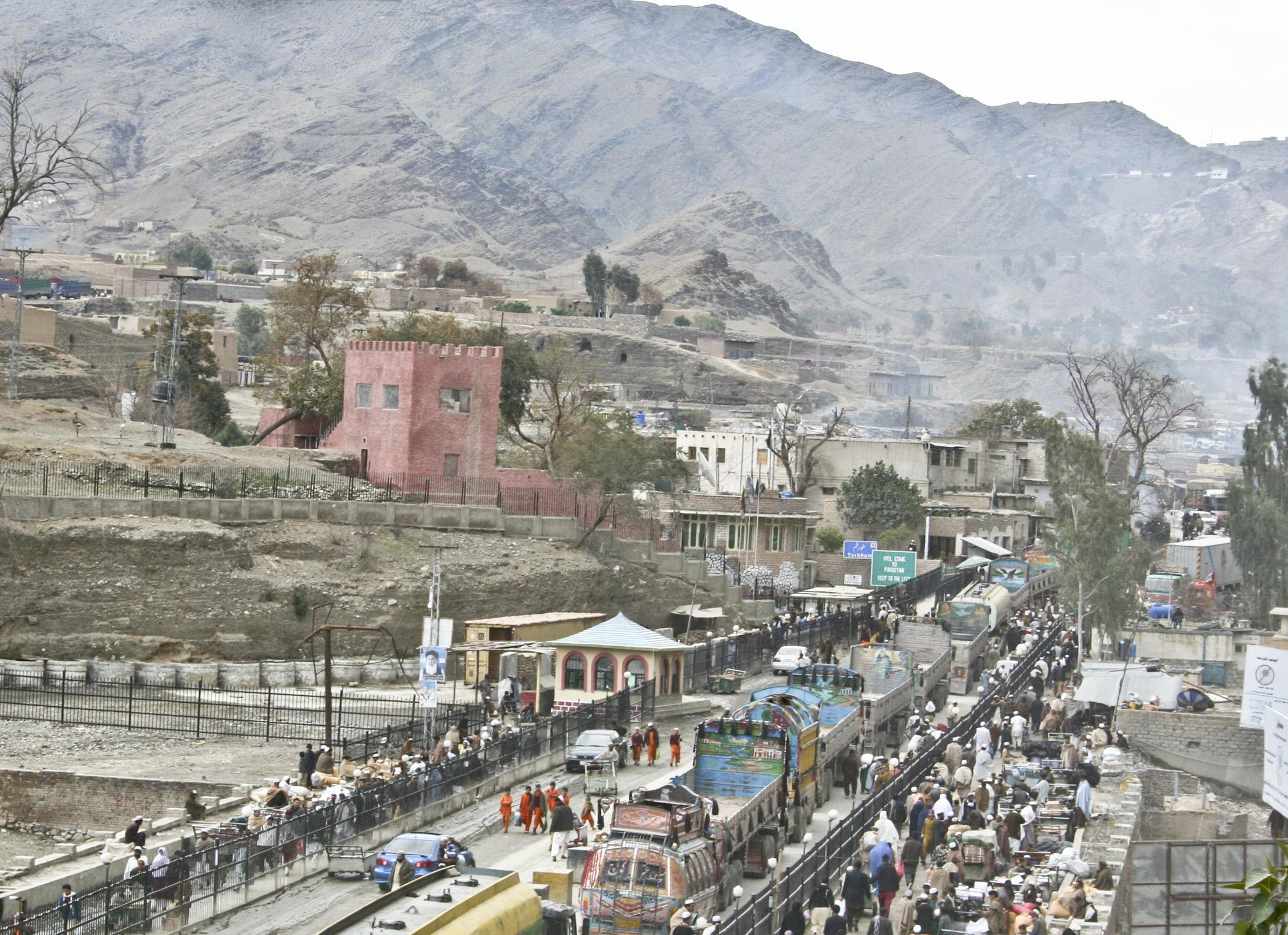
The border crossing at Torkham on the Khyber Pass in 2011

There are a few notable mountain passes in or near the Safed Koh mountain range. The famous Khyber Pass crosses a spur of Safed Koh. A second crossing, near Mount Sikaram, is called Peiwar Pass or Gawi Pass and connects Parachinar city on the Pakistani side with the Aryob Valley of Paktia Province, Afghanistan. The most viable route over the main ridge of Safed Koh is the Agam Pass (3586 m), over which the distance from Jalalabad to Parachinar is 92 km.

== History ==
The Durand Line border formed in 1893 between Afghanistan and British India cuts through these mountains.

According to US military intelligence, many al-Qaeda fighters, including Osama bin Laden, crossed Safed Koh to escape to Pakistan during the Tora Bora offensive in 2001. Bin Laden allegedly hid in the sparsely vegetated mountains in the northern part, called Tora Bora. After 2004, the Safed Koh mountain range was a pivotal place and theater of many battles fought between the foreign fighters of al-Qaeda and the joint Northern Command of the Pakistani military, with the latter trying to prevent the foreign fighters' incursion into Pakistan.

== See also ==
- List of mountain ranges
- List of highest mountains
- Koh-i-Baba
