= 2007 Kurram Agency conflict =

Sectarian conflict in Pakistan

- Part of the War in North-West Pakistan and Sectarian violence in Pakistan
Date	6 April – 13 April 2007 (1 week)
Location	Kurram Agency, Federally Administered Tribal Areas, Pakistan
Result	Victory For Pakistan and local Shia tribesmen as Pakistani Taliban militants lost their stronghold and fled to Afghanistan following military operations.: Siege of Parachinar broken; Shia militants claim victory and request for the Pakistan Army to move in later on; Kurram Agency becomes a stronghold for Shia militants; The Pakistani Taliban and their allies experience heavy losses; Pakistan Army captures strongholds of Sunni militants; Military offensives Operation Khwakh Ba De Sham and Operation Koh-e-Sufaid initiated by the Pakistan Army against the Pakistani Taliban; Sporadic fighting continues in Kurram Agency between Shia and Sunni militants, escalations into direct conflict between the two sects in 2023 and 2024.; A 14-point peace agreement was signed in 2025 by tribal elders and community leaders under the auspices of a government-backed Grand Peace Jirga.

Belligerents
Government of Pakistan; Pakistan Armed Forces; Pakistan Army; Law enforcement in Pakistan; KPK Police	Sunni Militants: Local Sunni tribesmen Soviet–Afghan War veterans (Sunni); Pakistani Taliban; Sipah-e-Sahaba; Lashkar-e-Jhangvi	Shia Militants: Local Shia tribesmen Soviet–Afghan War veterans (Shia); Sipah-e Muhammad; Tehreek-e Jafaria

The 2007 Kurram Agency conflict, also known as the Siege of Parachinar, began on 6 April 2007 in Kurram Agency, Federally Administered Tribal Areas, Pakistan when a group of Sunni gunmen opened fire on a Friday prayer held by Shia Muslims in Parachinar. It left more than 40 people dead and more than 150 people wounded by gunfire. Tensions grew in the area adjacent to the Afghan border since 1 April as Pakistani Taliban ally and anti-Shia sectarian group Ahl-e-Sunnat Wal Jamaat took part in Mawlid (prophet Muhammad's birthday) on 1 April, in which the group raised slogans against Shiites and made derogatory remarks towards historical Shia figures which erupt a sectarian controversy among the muslims in the kurram. On 6 April, a sectarian conflict intensely raised in Kurram Agency when a group of sectarian Sunni gunmen opened fire on the unarmed Shiites at the time of friday prayer, which triggered a heavy armed violence and bloodshed between the Shia-Sunni militia's that continues to date, Sectarian violence in Pakistan has been serious issue from then onwards.

In the recent years, the Pakistani federal government and provisional government along with local authorities have made significate disarmament efforts to mediate and resolve the Shia–Sunni conflict among the local Pashtun tribes of Kurram Agency, These efforts have been carried out through delegations of Pashtun jirgas, notably led by local Shia and Sunni politicians, tribal chieftains, and scholars such as Sajid Turi, Mufti Kifayatullah Swati and Munir Shakir in order to restore stability and promote inter-muslim unity.

The Kurram has experienced repeated cycles of sectarian and tribal violence, including escalations into direct conflict between the two sects in 2023 and 2024, Despite multiple peace initiatives, long-term stability has remained fragile due to persistent sectarian divisions, political mistrust, militant influence, and the district’s proximity to the Pakistan–Afghanistan border.

In January 2025, a 14-point peace agreement was signed by tribal elders and community leaders under the auspices of a government-backed Grand Peace Jirga, representing a continued effort to mitigate conflict in the region.

== Background ==
Kurram Agency has become increasingly victimized by sectarian violence as tensions grew between the Shiites and Sunnis of the agency since the Soviet–Afghan War. During the war, Kurram was the safe passage for the both Shia Sunni Mujahideen to carried out cross border attacks on Soviet Forces in Afghanistan but in the end of war Sunni Mujahideen attacked the Shia villages and in response Shia Mujahideen launched retaliatory attacks on Sunni villages.

== Timeline ==
=== April conflict ===
==== April 6 ====
During a Sunni procession celebrating the birth of the Prophet Muhammad in Parachinar on 1 April, a few men made derogatory remarks towards historical Shia figures. In response, Shias in Parachinar held a protest on 6 April where they responded with counter-slogans against Sectarian Sunnis. During the procession, an unidentified gunman opened fire on the crowd. Riots then consumed the city, with raiding and looting of local Sunni storefronts being reported. FATA authorities imposed a curfew across Kurram agency and sent soldiers into Parachinar after at least three people were reported to killed and 18 injured by the end of the day.

==== April 7 ====
Early in the day, Bell AH-1 Cobra helicopters attacked the positions of sectarian fighters in Parachinar before army and paramilitary forces in armoured personnel carriers secured the city. The sectarian groups were reportedly using heavy weaponry such as mortars and rocket-propelled grenades. A rocket attack on a home in Parachinar killed 14 people, including two women and four children. The government announced that anyone seen violating the curfew would be shot at by authorities. According to a FATA official, 40 people had been killed and 70 were wounded during the two day of fighting.

==== April 8 ====
Violence between sectarian fighters cooled down in Parachinar but intensified across Upper and Lower Kurram as tribal elders attempted to resolve the situation. Clashes in Pewar and Kirman left four and three people dead in the villages respectively, while mortar fire on a house in Alam Sher killed one person. Fighting in Sadda killed six people and led to electricity being disabled in the town. Additional clashes were reported in Tari Mangal, Balish Khel, Bashra, Mali Khel, Kadman and Para Chamkani among other areas. PTI chairman Imran Khan suggested that the conflict could be manufactured by the United States in order to harm Pakistan's relations with Iran.

==== April 9 ====
The government issued an ultimatum to cease all hostilities by 10 April or else an army offensive would be launched against the tribal fighters. Mortar fire hit a government building in Alizai, killing a security officer and injuring multiple others. A mortar shell struck a house in Sadda, killing two children and injuring four. Twelve people from Sadda were brought to a hospital in Peshawar, two of them dying in treatment.

==== April 10 ====
Clashes between fighters in Sadda and Balash Khel killed around 20 people according to locals. Electricity in Kurram was completely cut following an attack on the main transmission line in Alizai. The army fired artillery from their base in Parachinar across various areas in Kurram. Army reinforcements also entered Parachinar and Alizar.

==== April 11 ====
Militants allegedly from North Waziristan attacked the villages of Jilamai and Chardewal, killing 15 people altogether. Authorities responding to the villages reportedly opened fire on rioters, killing at least 35. Four people were killed in Shalozan Tangi, while a rocket attack in Shoblan killed a woman and injured two children in a house. A rocket hit a house in Almsher village killing a woman. Army soldiers entered Sadda, leading a gunfight which left four sectarian fighters dead and another four injured. After securing the city, local authorities announced the establishment of a ceasefire in the city. A reduction in hostilities around the outskirts of Parachinar was reported.

==== April 12 ====
Five Shia's were reportedly killed by gunmen in Chardewar, with another five suffering injuries. Clashes with bandits in Jilamai killed four people. A Peace Jirga delegation of twenty Sunni and twenty Shia scholars and tribal elders arrived at Parachinar after travelling from Hangu the previous day. A ceasefire across Kurram agency was later declared.

==== April 13 ====
The curfew in Parachinar was loosened for two hours from 3:00 PM to 5:00 PM. The Peace Jirga was in the process of negotiating a settlement and written agreement with the two factions.

=== August attack ===
On 4 August, a suicide bomber rammed an explosive-laden vehicle into a bus station in Parachinar, killing 10 people and injuring 35 others.

=== November conflict ===
On 16 November, Sectarian clashes again broke out in Kurram Agency, Parachinar after Sipah-e-Muhammad affiliated Shia armed gunmen opened fire inside a Sunni Ahl-e-Sunnat Wal Jamaat linked sectarian Anti-Shia mosque and madrasa in the avenge of 6 April Friday prayer attack, killing at least 10 and more than 20 injured also causing the significant damage to the madrasa. The attack triggered a renewed conflict between Sunni and Shia fighters in Kurram, with 30 people being killed and over 100 being injured by the end of 17 November. By 18 November, at least 61 people had been killed, with the government imposing a curfew upon the city once again. On 19 November, Pakistani soldiers with attack helicopter support moved into the city, forcing the sectarian fighters to retreat from their positions to Afghanistan. By the end of the day, the number of casualties from the conflict had risen to at least 80, 11 of them being Pakistani soldiers.

== See also ==
- 2023 Kurram Parachinar conflict
- 2024 Kurram conflict
