= 2013 Parachinar bombing =

2013 bombing attack in Parachinar, Pakistan

- Part of War in North-West Pakistan
- Location of Federally Administered Tribal Areas in Pakistan
- Location: Parachinar, Kurram Valley, Federally Administered Tribal Areas, Pakistan
- Date: 26 July 2013
- Target: Market
- Attack type: Bombing
- Deaths: 57
- Injuries: 100
- Perpetrator: unknown

The 2013 Parachinar bombing was a bombing incident that occurred in Parachinar, Pakistan on 26 July 2013. At least 57 people were killed and more than 100 injured after two bombs exploded on a market in Parachinar a capital city in Kurram Valley and the largest city of the Federally Administered Tribal Areas in northern Pakistan on Friday the official said. The blast took place near the Afghan border and Shi'ite mosques. On 27 July 2013 the death toll rose to 57.

== See also ==
- Terrorist incidents in Pakistan in 2013
