= 2023 Parachinar school shooting =

School shooting in Pakistan

- Location: Parachinar, Kurram District, Khyber Pakhtunkhwa, Pakistan
- Date: 4 May 2023
- Attack type: Mass shooting
- Deaths: 8
- Injuries: 3
- Motive: unknown

On 4 May 2023, a school shooting took place at a high school in Parachinar, Kurram District, Khyber Pakhtunkhwa, Pakistan, killing seven people and wounding three police officers. Earlier in the day, a teacher from the same school was shot dead in a separate attack.

== Shooting ==
During school hours, an unidentified group of gunmen surrounded Government High School Tari Mangal, where the teachers at the school were performing exam duties and students were taking exams. The group then opened fire in the staffroom of the high school, killing seven people, which included four teachers and two attendants.

The victims were from Pakistan's minority Shiite community, which is frequently targeted by militants. Most teachers were from the local Turi tribe. Law enforcement were also attacked while responding to the incident, resulting in three police officers being injured.

Earlier that day, a Sunni teacher from the same school was shot dead in Kurram in a separate attack. It is speculated that the mass shooting was possibly conducted in response.

== Response ==
An emergency was declared for all the health facilities in Kurram District, and the Kohat Board postponed exams for ninth and tenth graders. The perpetrators then fled the incident area, prompting a hunt.

== Motive ==
Regional authorities provided contradictory motives for the shootings, with the provincial chief minister stating it was over a property dispute, while the regional commissioner said it was due to sectarian antagonism.

== Reactions ==
The KP interim Chief Minister, Mohammad Azam Khan, blamed the shooting on a land dispute. Upper Kurram District Police Officer Muhammad Imran responded to the incident by implementing security measures, closing down traffic, and starting talks with tribal chiefs to get things back to normal. Shehbaz Sharif, the prime minister, and the interim chief minister of KP requested reports on the attacks, while interior minister Rana Sanaullah tweeted that those responsible would face consequences.

President Arif Alvi and Foreign Minister Bilawal Bhutto Zardari called for those responsible for the attack to be punished. Former Pakistani President Asif Ali Zardari and senior Shiite leader Inayat Hussain Toori also condemned the attack.

On 5 May, thousands of mourners attended the victims' mass funeral and rallied against the killings.
