= Mount Sikaram =

Mountain in Pakistan and Afghanistan

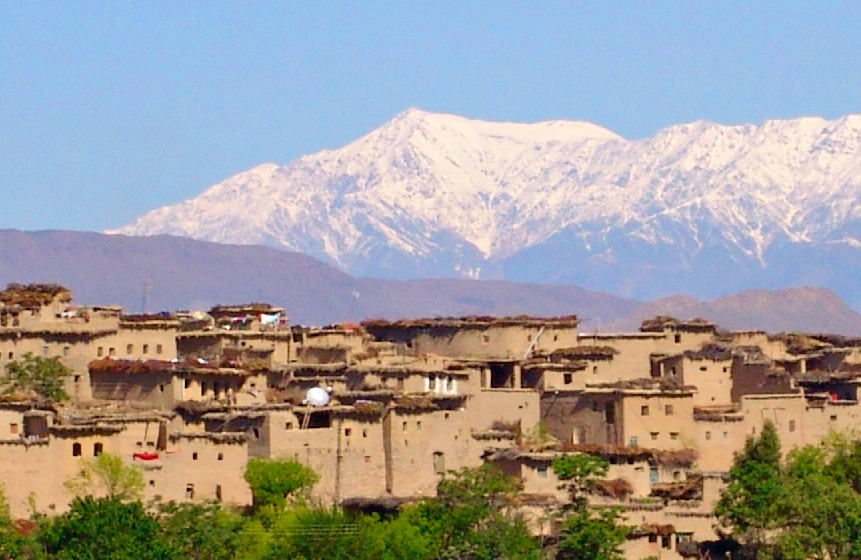
- Mount Sikaram viewed from Kurram Valley, Pakistan

Highest point
- Elevation: 4,755 m (15,600 ft)
- Prominence: 2,295 m (7,530 ft)
- Listing: Ultra
- Coordinates: 34°02′18″N 69°54′09″E

Geography
- Location within Afghanistan Location within Khyber Pakhtunkhwa Location within Pakistan
- Location: Afghanistan–Pakistan Border
- Countries: Afghanistan and Pakistan
- Provinces/Districts: Logar, Paktia and Parachinar
- Parent range: Spin Ghar (Safed Koh), Hindu Kush, Western Himalayas

Mount Sikaram (Pashto: سیکرم) is a mountain on the Afghanistan–Pakistan border, south of the Kabul River and Khyber Pass. At 4,755 m (15,600 ft), it is the highest peak of the Spīn Ghar, or Safēd Kōh, mountain range.

== Location ==
Mount Sikaram is located north of the village of Peshawar in the Kurram District of Pakistan’s Khyber Pakhtunkhwa province. Its parent range, Spīn Ghar, connects directly with the Shandūr offshoot of the Hindu Kush mountain system. Atop the range, temperatures can fall below 0 °C (32 °F) at any time of the year.

A small valley on the slope of Mount Sikaram encompasses a number of villages, settlements, and tribal regions—many of them historically significant—including Peiwar, Alizai, Tari Mangal, Narai, Speena Shaga, and Khewas. The Gawi Pass, also known as the Peiwar Kotal Pass, runs between the Kurram Valley and Afghanistan's Aryub Valley; it connects the Paktia Province of Afghanistan with the Kurram District of Khyber Pakhtunkhwa province in the former FATA region of Pakistan.

== History ==
- 1878: British forces were victorious over Afghan forces and seized control of the Peiwar Pass in the Battle of Peiwar Kotal.
- 1878-1879: British surveyor George Batley Scott climbed the mountain during a campaign to survey Afghanistan.

== See also ==
- Hindu Kush
- Mountain ranges of Pakistan
- List of Mountains in Pakistan
- List of mountain ranges of the world
- List of ultras of the Karakoram and Hindu Kush
