= Alizai =

Alizai may refer to:

- Alizai, Kurram, a village in Kurram Agency, Federally Administered Tribal Areas of Pakistan
- Alizai (Pashtun tribe), a Pashtun tribe in Afghanistan and Pakistan

== People with the surname ==
- Ahmadullah Alizai (born 1972), Afghan politician
