= Laghar Juy =

Village in Nangarhar Province, Afghanistan

Coordinates: 34°06′N 70°32′E

Laghar Juy (Pashto: لغړ جوی) is a small village in Afghanistan. It is located in the southern portion of the Kot Valley which is at the base of the Spin Ghar mountain range, sometimes referred to as the Tora Bora mountain range.

== See also ==
- Nangarhar Province
