= Karakhela =

Coordinates: 33°53′N 70°01′E

Karakhela, or Kara Khel, is a village located about one kilometer west of Parachinar city and approximately 10 kilometers east of the Pak–Afghan border, known as the Durand Line. According to the 2017 Census of Pakistan, Karakhela has a population of 3,934 people living in 389 houses.

The district of Kurram was formerly known as Kurram Agency and was part of the Federally Administered Tribal Areas (FATA) of Pakistan. The village of Shalozan lies to the north, while Nastikot is located to the south.

A common native plant in the area is Elaeagnus angustifolia, commonly known as silver berry or Russian olive (locally called Sinzalay). Karakhela was once known for its significant production of Artemisia kurramensis (Tharkha), a medicinal plant widely used in traditional medicine.

The literacy rate in the village is gradually increasing. Karakhela has produced several engineers, army officers, and a few doctors, including Dr. Muhammad Afzal, the area's first PhD graduate in Computer Science. He is an Artificial Intelligence researcher and computer scientist currently serving as an Associate Professor at a university in the United Kingdom.

Access to clean drinking water remains a major issue across the entire Kurram district, but Karakhela has been facing particularly severe shortages for many years.
