= 2008 Parachinar bombing =

Terrorist incident in Pakistan

Coordinates: 33°54′N 70°06′E

- Parachinar (Pakistan)
- Location: Parachinar, Pakistan
- Date: 16 February 2008
- Target: Riaz Shah, Political Rally
- Attack type: Car Suicide attack
- Deaths: 70
- Injuries: 150

In the Parachinar bombing of 16 February 2008, a suicide bomber in Parachinar, Pakistan killed 70 people and injured 110 attending a political rally for the opposition Pakistan Peoples Party. The attack occurred on the eve of the 2008 Pakistani general election to be held on 18 February when an explosives-laden car was rammed into the election office of an independent candidate in Parachinar. The attack targeted people in a rally outside Riaz Shah's campaign office.

A suicide attacker struck his car full of explosive and petrol gallon in Eidgah Market area, an entrance point in Parachinar. 43 Persons died at the spot, including the suicide bomber, while more than 200 people were injured. According to eyewitnesses, 7 shops of the market located near the blast site were destroyed completely which reflects the intensity of the blast. The blast also damaged electricity wires which suspended the electricity in the city. This blast was carried out just 10 meters away from the location of the 2007 Parachinar bombing.

The attack on the rally came as Riaz Shah launched a final push for votes before a midnight deadline after which all rallies were banned until after the election. The bombing was believed to be motivated by sectarianism, as the majority of the area's residents are Shia Muslims.

== After the attack ==
The army imposed a curfew in the northwestern tribal area town of Parachinar after the bomb blast. Funerals would be held for many of the victims Sunday, officials said, and the army agreed to relax its curfew in some areas so family members could attend. Early on Sunday 17 February 2008, the wreckage of four cars flipped over by the force of the blast littered the street near the site. Most shops were shuttered and streets were largely deserted. More than 200 relatives of the dead blocked the main road with stones and milled around in the streets. Dozens of heavily armed army and paramilitary troops set up barricades at two roads into Parachinar, just over a mountain from the Afghan area of Tora Bora.

Panicked people stood on the blood stained street after the blast, with local people and vehicles arriving to take bodies away. The bodies and wounded were shifted to the hospital immediately with some of the injured in critical condition. According to one injured man, Gulraiz Khan: "I came out from the centre and stood beside the road, a car came over there at the place of the blast and then a big blast occurred, after that I don't know what happened."

== Responsibility ==
The Pakistani Taliban splinter local Sunni militant group Sipah-e-Sahaba Pakistan claimed responsibility.

== See also ==
- Bomb blasts in Parachinar since 2007
