= 2024 Kurram attack =

Terrorist attack in Pakistan

- Part of the sectarian violence in Pakistan, insurgency in Khyber Pakhtunkhwa
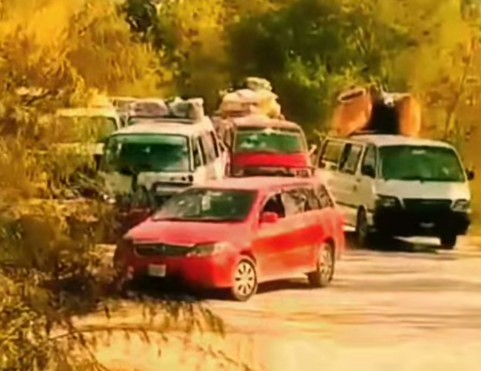
- Location: Kurram District, Khyber Pakhtunkhwa, Pakistan
- Date: 21 November 2024
- Target: A large convoy of 200 vehicles transporting Shia Muslims
- Attack type: Mass shooting, ambush
- Deaths: 54
- Injuries: 86 (16 critically)
- Perpetrator: Islamic State (suspected)
- No. of participants: 4
- Motive: Anti-Shi'ism

On 21 November 2024, gunmen attacked a large convoy of vehicles transporting Shia Muslims in the Kurram District of Pakistan's Khyber Pakhtunkhwa province, killing at least 54 people and injuring 86 others. The attack was one of northwestern Pakistan's deadliest incidents of sectarian violence in recent years. The attack was described as a "terrorist attack" by Pakistani authorities.

== Background ==
The attack, one of northwestern Pakistan's deadliest incidents of sectarian violence in recent years, marked a significant escalation in sectarian tensions that had already claimed numerous lives in preceding months.

Sunni and Shia Muslims are in conflict in the region over a dispute of religion beliefs. Half of the population of the Kurram region are Shia Muslims, while the majority of Pakistan are Sunni Muslims.

== Attack ==
Four gunmen emerged from a vehicle and opened fire on a convoy of over 200 vehicles containing Shia Muslims traveling from Parachinar to Peshawar along a remote highway. The gunmen initially targeted police escort vehicles, who were assigned to protect the convoy due to prior instances of sectarian violence on roadways, before firing on the passengers. Additional attackers reportedly fired from nearby farm fields.

The assault lasted approximately 40 minutes, claiming the lives of over 38 men, five children and eight women, while leaving dozens of victims in critical condition at local hospitals. No group initially claimed responsibility for the attack.

== Aftermath ==
The attack triggered renewed sectarian clashes in Kurram. Rioters in the villages of Bagan and Bacha Kot set fire to shops, houses and government buildings. Protesters in Parachinar set ablaze two police checkpoints. Internet was shut down, mobile services were suspended, schools were closed and a severe medicine and food shortage occurred after the attack. Reports emerged of intense gunfire in Lower Kurram Agency between the Alizai and Bagan tribes.

By 28 November, 110 people had been killed in fighting across Kurram with an additional 150 being wounded as well as over 300 shops and 100 houses being razed. The death toll had risen to 133 by 3 December, with 177 being wounded.

== Reactions ==
=== Domestic ===
The incident prompted immediate responses from Pakistan's leadership: Interior Minister Mohsin Naqvi categorized it as a terrorist attack, while Prime Minister Shehbaz Sharif and President Asif Ali Zardari issued strong condemnations and promises of justice against the parties responsible. Heightened security measures were implemented. Nadeem Aslam Chaudhry, Chief Secretary of Khyber Pakhtunkhwa, called the attack a "major tragedy" and said the death toll was likely to rise.

Local Shia leaders criticized authorities for failing to provide adequate security despite recent threats against the Shia community. Several shop owners in Parachinar went on strike in protest against regional violence.

=== Foreign governments ===
Iranian President Masoud Pezeshkian condemned the attack, expressing his condolences to the government Pakistan and the families of the victims. Iranian Foreign Minister Abbas Araghchi wrote on his X account, "Our condolences to the victims' families and the people and government of brotherly Pakistan. We ask Almighty Allah for the speedy recovery of those injured. We spare no effort in strengthening bilateral and multilateral coordination and cooperation to uproot the scourge of terrorism".

US State Department Spokesperson Matthew Miller expressed solidarity with Pakistan during a press briefing, condemning the attack and expressing sympathy for the victims and their families. Miller additionally highlighted the United States' cooperation with the Pakistani government in counterterrorism. Spokesperson of the US embassy in Islamabad Jonathan Lalley expressed a similar sentiment to the State Department, stating that Pakistanis 'deserve to live free from harm, danger, and threat, and to feel protected and secure in their daily lives' and that the US will remain a 'steadfast partner' to the nation. Additional messages of solidarity were issued by the Australian, Iranian and Russian embassies in Islamabad.

== See also ==
- 2022 Peshawar mosque attack
- 2023 Peshawar mosque bombing
- 2023 Parachinar school shooting
- 2012 Kohistan Shia massacre
