= Alizai, Kurram =

Alizai علی زئی
- Location within Khyber Pakhtunkhwa Location within Pakistan
- Coordinates: 33°32′16″N 70°20′39″E
- Country: Pakistan
- Province: Khyber Pakhtunkhwa
- District: Kurram District
- Elevation: 1,020 m (3,350 ft)

Population (1998)
  - Estimate (2006): 3,334
- Time zone: UTC+5 (PST)
- Calling code: 0926

Alizai (Urdu:علی زئی) is a town in the Lower Kurram Valley in the Kurram District of Khyber Pakhtunkhwa, Pakistan. Alizai is located near the Durand Line, the international border with Afghanistan, about 50 kilometres (31 mi) northeast of Khost, Afghanistan.

It is Tehsil headquarters of Lower Kurram. Kurram Valley is administratively divided into three tehsils. The Alizai Tehsil jurisdiction start from Sakhi Ahmadshah in the south, to Chapri at the gateway entrance of Kurram up to Ahmad Shah in North & Wali Chenna in the west. This area faced massive fighting between the Pakistani Army and the TTP, the place became safe later on however, although some civil unrest took place recently 2 Suicide Bombers attacked School Ground in 2015. The British Govt maintained detention facilities in Alizai, Pakistan at 1930s.(The elders calls that facility as "Zulam Ghar", Urdu language word which means The House of Brutality and that Facility is nowadays called Alizai Tehsil. Which consist of Political Tehsildar Office and a small custody jail. It is second oldest Tehsil to Parachinar in Kurram District. The town Alizai is located in the north of Thall city on Thall-Parachinar Highway. The Highway pass in the middle of the town, starting from Khawaja Ali Baba in the south and ending on Malak Arbab Mela in the north. On the western side of Alizai is Kurram River which separates Alizai from Jalamai, Chardewar, Pingo, Bagzai, Inziri and Munda villages. The eastern side is mountainous central Kurram, the southern side is Bagan and on the north the nearest town is Sadda.
