= Tari Mangal =

Tari Mangal تري منګل
- Village
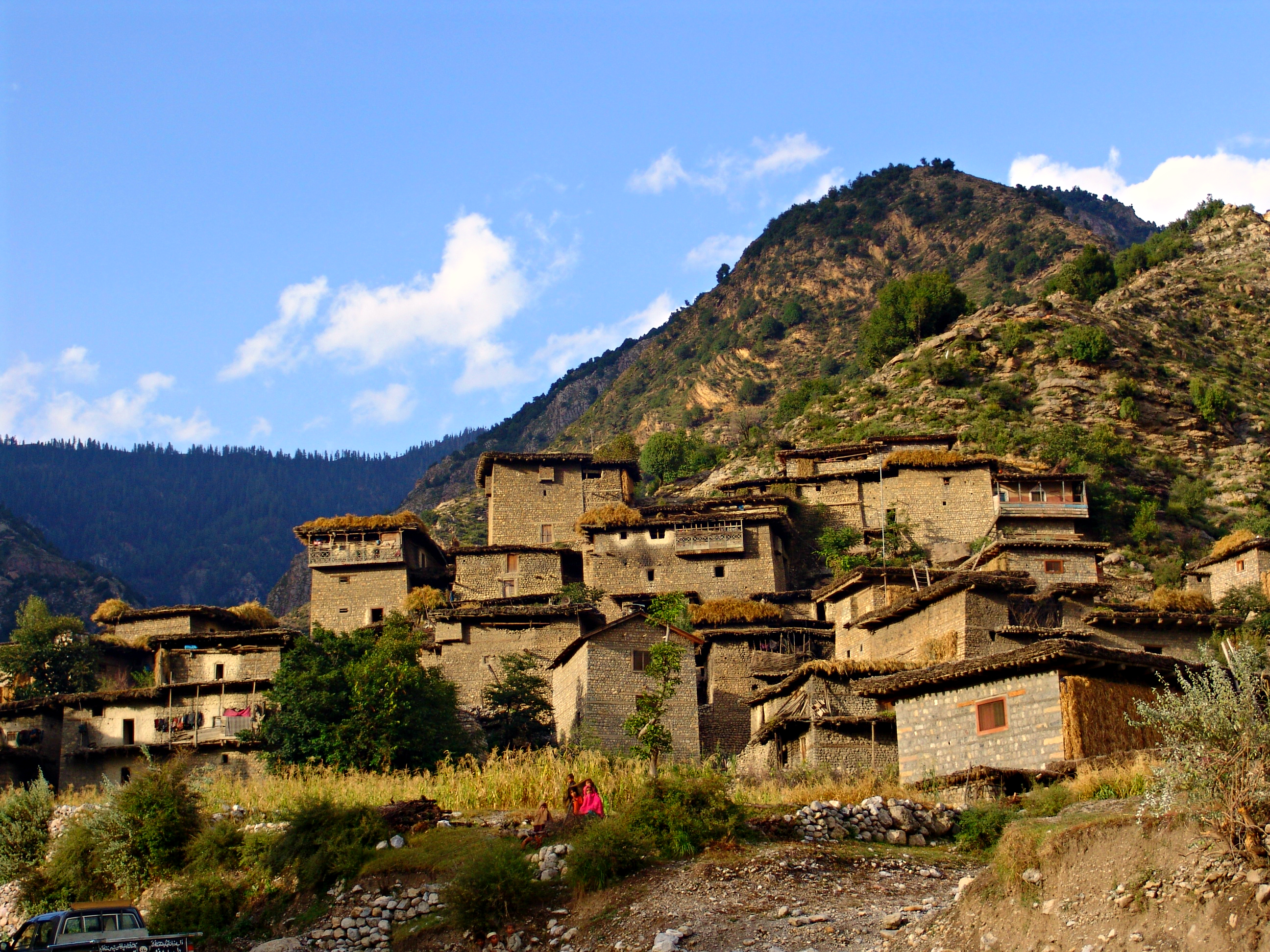

- Location in Kurram Valley
- Coordinates: 33.96°N 69.88°E
- Country: Pakistan
- State: Khyber Pakhtunkwa
- District: Kurram Valley

Government
  - Type: Frontier Crimes Regulations

Area
  - Total: 108 km^{2} (42 sq mi)
- Elevation: 2,174 m (7,133 ft)

Population (2000)
  - Total: 3,000
  - Density: 28/km^{2} (72/sq mi)

Tribal
  - Language: Pushtu
- Time zone: UTC+5 (PKT)
- Telephone code: 0926
- Vehicle registration: FATA
- Distance from Parachinar: 23 kilometres (14 mi)
- Avg. summer temperature: 13 °C (55 °F)
- Avg. winter temperature: −2 °C (28 °F)
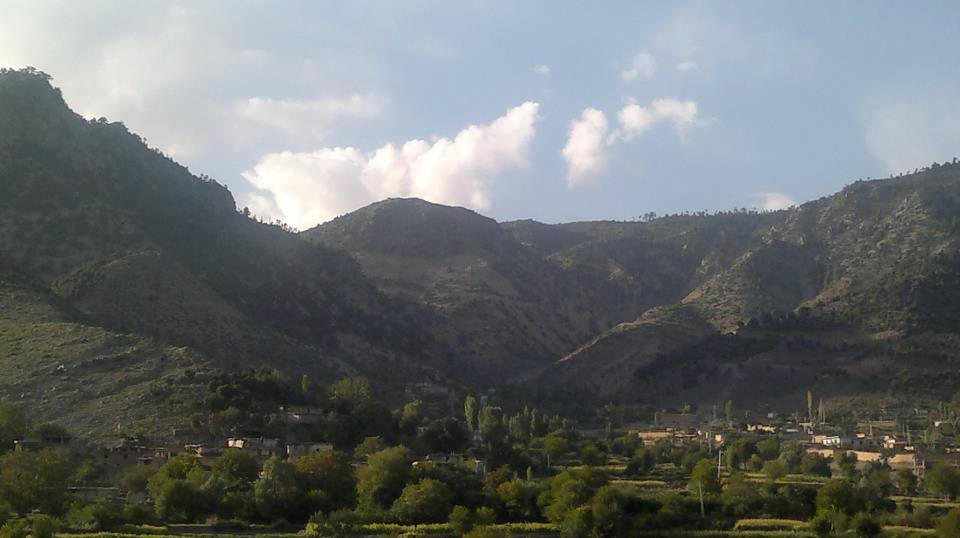
- A city on the border between Pakistan & Afghanistan Tari Mangal

Tari Mangal (Pashto: تري منګل) is a town in the Kurram Valley at the Durand Line, near Spin Ghar, in Khyber Pakhtunkhwa in Pakistan. Tari Mangal is 23 kilometres (14 mi) away from Parachinar, and 10 kilometres (6.2 mi) from the town of Aryob in Zazi District, Afghanistan. The Pashtun tribe Mangal has been living in Tari Mangal since 1600 AD. From 1977 to 1988, during the Soviet–Afghan War, the city served as a Mujahideen camp. Weapons and funds from the United States, via Pakistan, were delivered to Afghanistan through the border at Tari Mangal, as well as its neighbouring region Torkham. Due to Tari Mangal's temperate weather in the summer, many people from hot areas in Pakistan visit Tari Mangal to enjoy the cold weather.

== History ==
Current-day Tari Mangal is control by the Mangal tribe since 1600 AD. At that time, prior to the partition of India and formation of an independent Pakistan in 1947, Tari Mangal was a part of British India.

== Education ==
Tari Mangal, like Parachinar, was growing and thriving until war came to the area in 2007. Due to the Kurram Agency War April 2007, many government services were discontinued. For example, from 2007 to 2014, all government schools were closed. With the exception of the Government Girls Primary School, all have now reopened. There are now three schools in Tari Mangal:

1. Government High School Tari Mangal.
2. International Public School Tari Mangal, administered by education reformer and political activist Syed Ahmad Shah
3. Government Girls Primary School, organized by the federal government

== Climate ==
Climate conditions in Tari Mangal are generally favorable. January and February are the harshest months due to snow, rain, and cold temperatures. Occasionally, heavy fog and cold air coming from the Spin Ghar mountain range add to adverse weather conditions. From the middle of June to the middle of August, temperatures can be warm. During the rest of the year, however, the climate is moderate and considered to be ideal. Even in the summer months, there is generally no need for air conditioning or fans.

== Population demographic ==
Many people use the border between Pakistan and Afghanistan for business and trade. However, nowadays a significant number of locals reside and work abroad in places like the United Arab Emirates and Saudi Arabia, bringing prosperity back to the area.

== Tari Mangal post ==
Tari Mangal Post is a fort located in the Federally Administered Tribal Areas in Pakistan.It was constructed by British Government in 1905. Its estimated elevation is 2174 meters above sea level. Latitude: 33°57'25.98" Longitude: 69°53'38"

== Ali Mangal Post ==
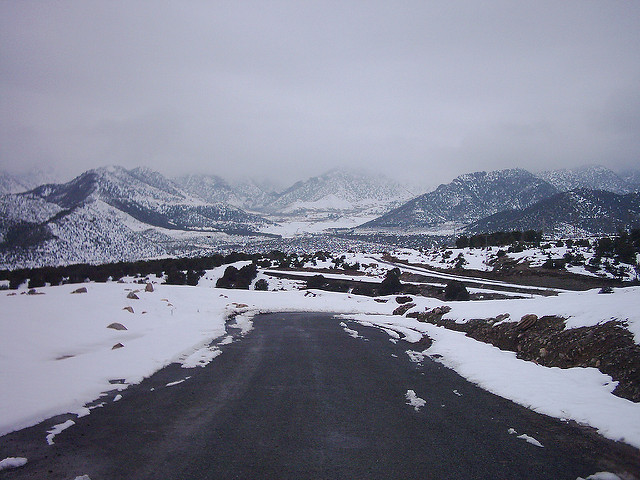
Road From Ali Mangal Post to Tari Mangal

Tari Mangal is located 0.8 km from Ali Mangal Post. Its estimated elevation is 2079 meters above sea level, 6820.87 ft, 81850.44 in. Latitude: 33° 57' 44" North Longitude: 69° 56' 5" East

== Nearby villages ==
1. Kotri Mangal
2. Sursurang
3. Gido
4. Gobazana
5. Haq Dara
6. Pewar Tangai
7. Shelozan Tangai

== See also ==
- Mangal (Pashtun tribe)
- Loya Paktia
