= Kurram District =

District in Pakistan

Coordinates: 33°49′N 69°58′E

Kurram District کورمې ولسوالۍ
- District of Khyber Pakhtunkhwa
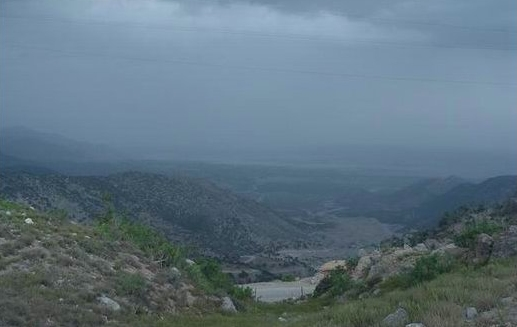
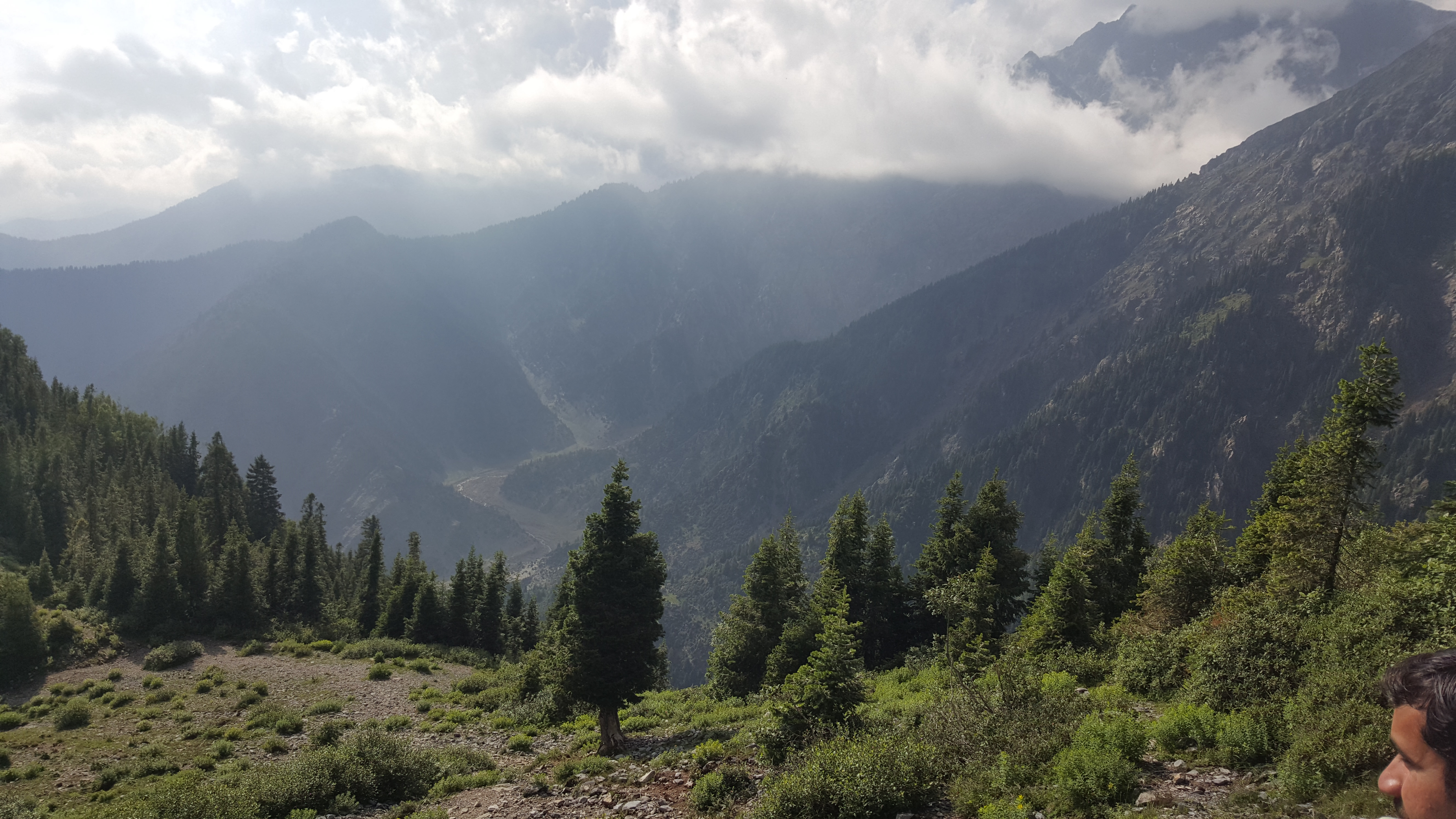
- Top: View of Kurram from Paktia Border; Bottom: Mountains near Parachinar

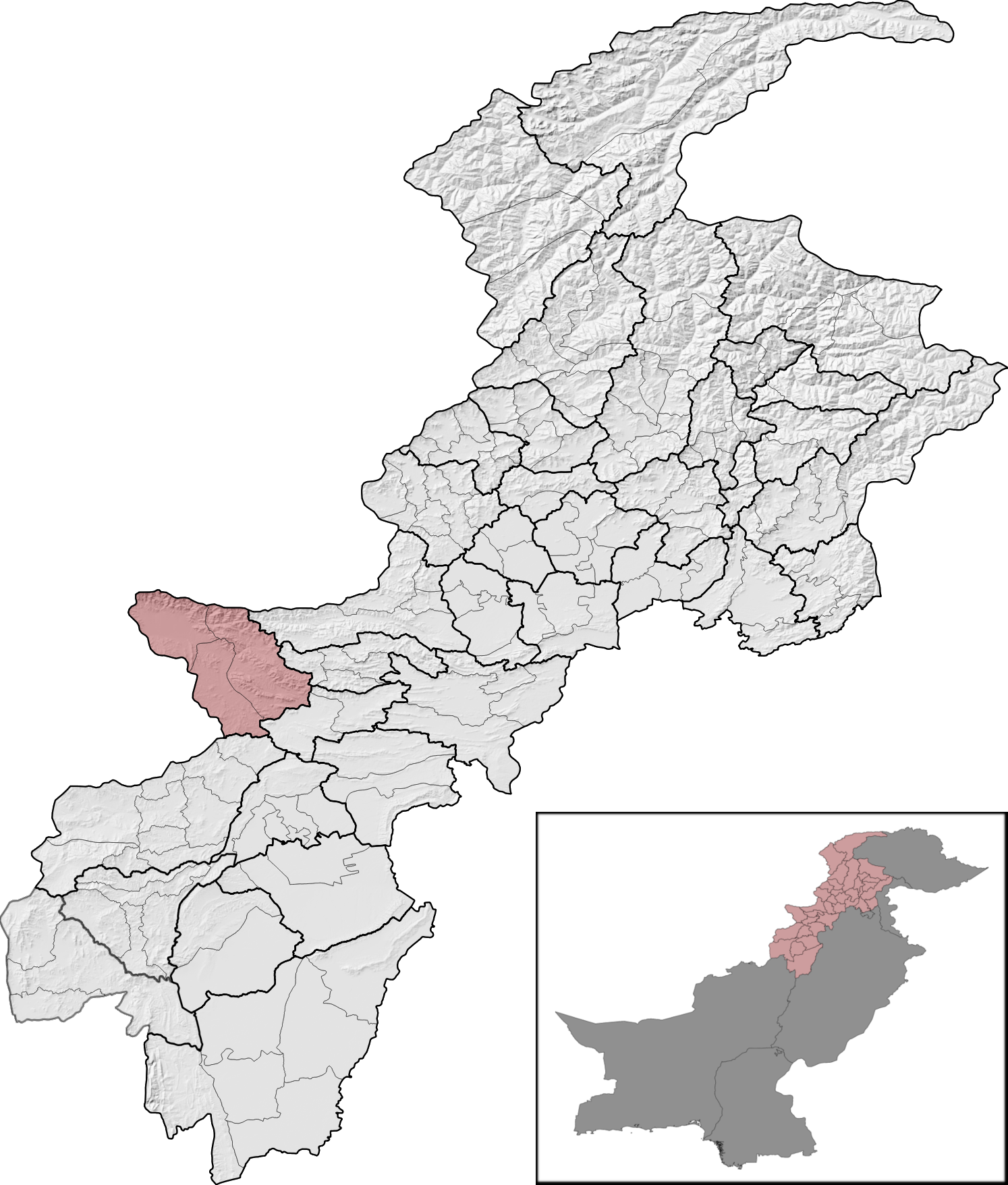
- Kurram District (red) in Khyber Pakhtunkhwa
- Country: Pakistan
- Province: Khyber Pakhtunkhwa
- Division: Kohat
- Headquarter: Parachinar
- Number of Tehsils: 3

Government
  - Type: District Administration
  - District Health Officer: N/A

Area
  - District of Khyber Pakhtunkhwa: 3,380 km^{2} (1,310 sq mi)

Population (2023)
  - District of Khyber Pakhtunkhwa: 785,434
  - Density: 232.4/km^{2} (602/sq mi)
  - Urban: 45,471 (5.79%)
  - Rural: 739,963 (94.21%)

Literacy
  - Literacy rate: Total: (35.22%); Male: (49.39%); Female: (20.65%)
- Time zone: UTC+5 (PST)
- Main language: Pashto (98.6%) (1998 census)
- Website: kurram.kp.gov.pk

Kurram District (Pashto: کورمې ولسوالۍ) is a district of Kohat Division in the Khyber Pakhtunkhwa province of Pakistan. Until 2018, it functioned as an agency of the Federally Administered Tribal Areas, however, with the merger of the Tribal Areas with Khyber Pakhtunkhwa, it attained the status of a district. Geographically, it covers the Kurram Valley in northwestern Pakistan.

Up until the year 2000, when the previous administrative divisions were abolished, the Kurram District was part of the Peshawar Division in the North-West Frontier Province (Now Khyber Pakhtunkhwa) of Pakistan.

== Etymology ==
The name Kurram comes from the river Kwarma (Pashto: کورمه) in Pashto, which itself derives from the Sanskrit word Krumu (Sanskrit: क्रुमु).

It is also believed name Kurram comes from the river Kurram, which flows along the valley. These mountains also border Afghanistan with the district. Geographically, the Kurram District is a connecting bridge as it interfaces with three provinces of Afghanistan: Khost, Paktia and Nangarhar (Tora bora).

The Kurram River drains the southern flanks of the Safed Koh mountain range, and enters the Indus plains north of Bannu. It flows west to east and crosses the Paktia Province Afghan-Pakistan border at about 80 km (50 mi) southwest of Jalalabad, and joins the Indus near Isa Khel after a course of more than 320 km (200 mi). The district has an area of 3,310 km^{2} (1,280 sq mi); the population according to the 1998 census was 448,310. It lies between the Miranzai Valley.

== History ==
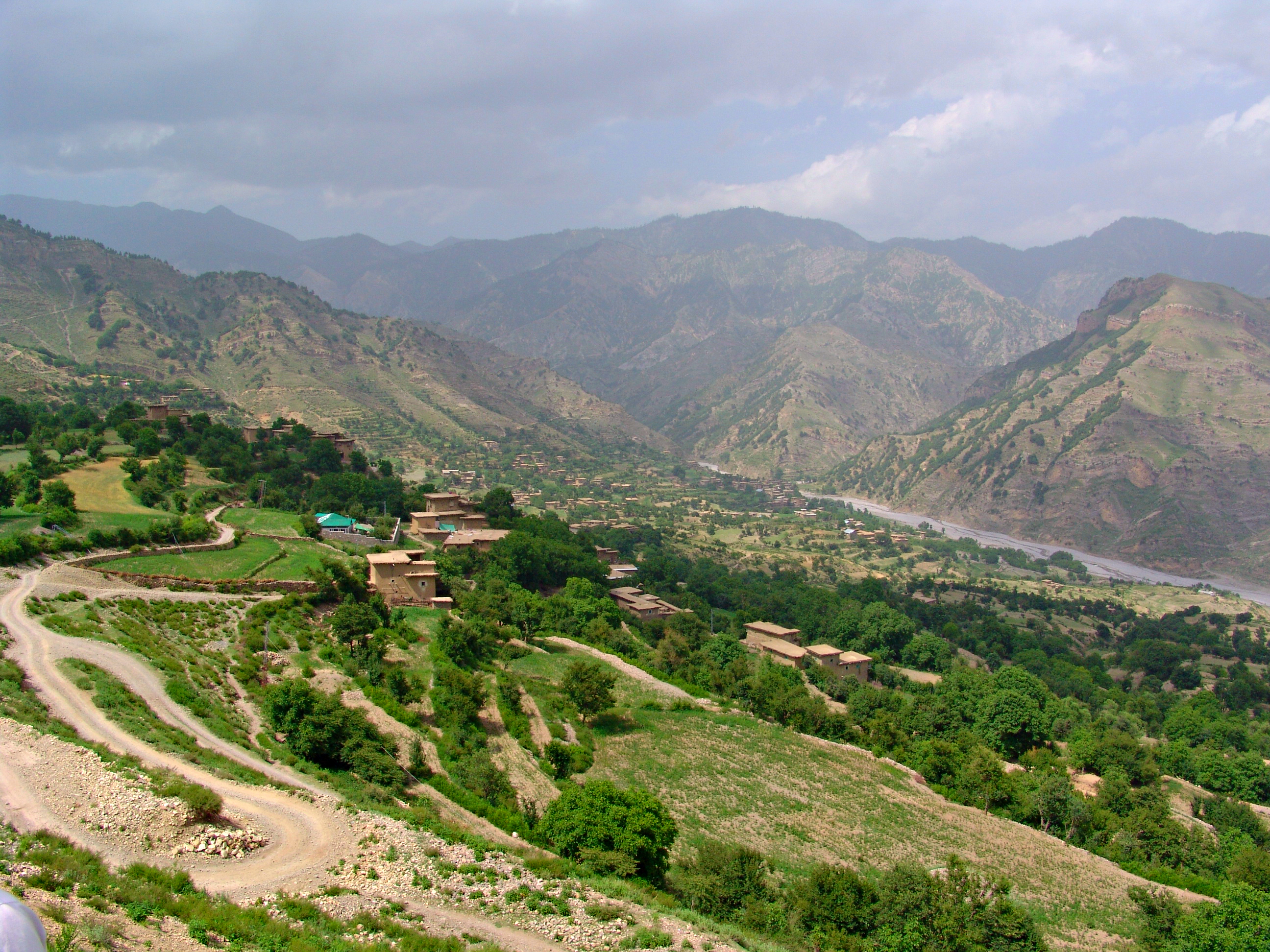
Tari Mengal, Pewar

In the Rigveda, the Kurrum is mentioned as Krumu. The Kurram Valley in ancient times offered the most direct route to Kabul and Gardez. The route crossed a pass 3,439 metres (11,283 ft) high, just over 20 km (12 mi) west of modern Parachinar and Sadda, that was blocked by snow for several months of the year.

The valley is highly irrigated, well populated and crowded with small fortified villages, orchards, and groves, to which a fine background is afforded by the dark pine forests and alpine snows of the Safed Koh. The beauty and climate of the valley attracted some of the Mughal emperors of Delhi, and the remains exist of a garden planted by Shah Jahan. According to the Gazetteer of Kurram, the richness of the land gradually weaned the Turks from their nomadic life. Sections built villages and settled permanently; they ceased to be Kuchi and became Kothi this abandonment of their nomadic habits by the majority of the resulted, as it was bound to do, in a contraction of the area in effective possession. The upper Kurram plain was safe as their headquarters, but hills and slopes below the Safed Koh and Mandher over which their graziers had kept an efficient watch, now afforded a menace as a place in which an encroaching tribe could establish itself. To guard against this settlements of Mangals and Muqbils were half invited half allowed to push themselves in conditions of vassalage, and on promise to afford a buttress against any enemy aggression. In the lower Kurram, where for climatic reasons candidates for settlements were fewer, the problem was not easily solved. The Chardi Turis seem to have been the first to abandon their nomadic life. As the numbers who went down to graze every year became less, the area under control contracted. Sangroba and Hadmela were left far behind and as the Turis receded the Watizai Zaimushts gradually pushed in, until all that was left was a settlement at and about Alizai. On the western side the Saragallas retained, and still largely retain their habits. They too put in settlements around Biliamin and after much intervening warfare had finally to admit Bangashes brother not as vassals, but for the rest they retain unimpaired the rights on the western bank which they acquired at the time the conquest.

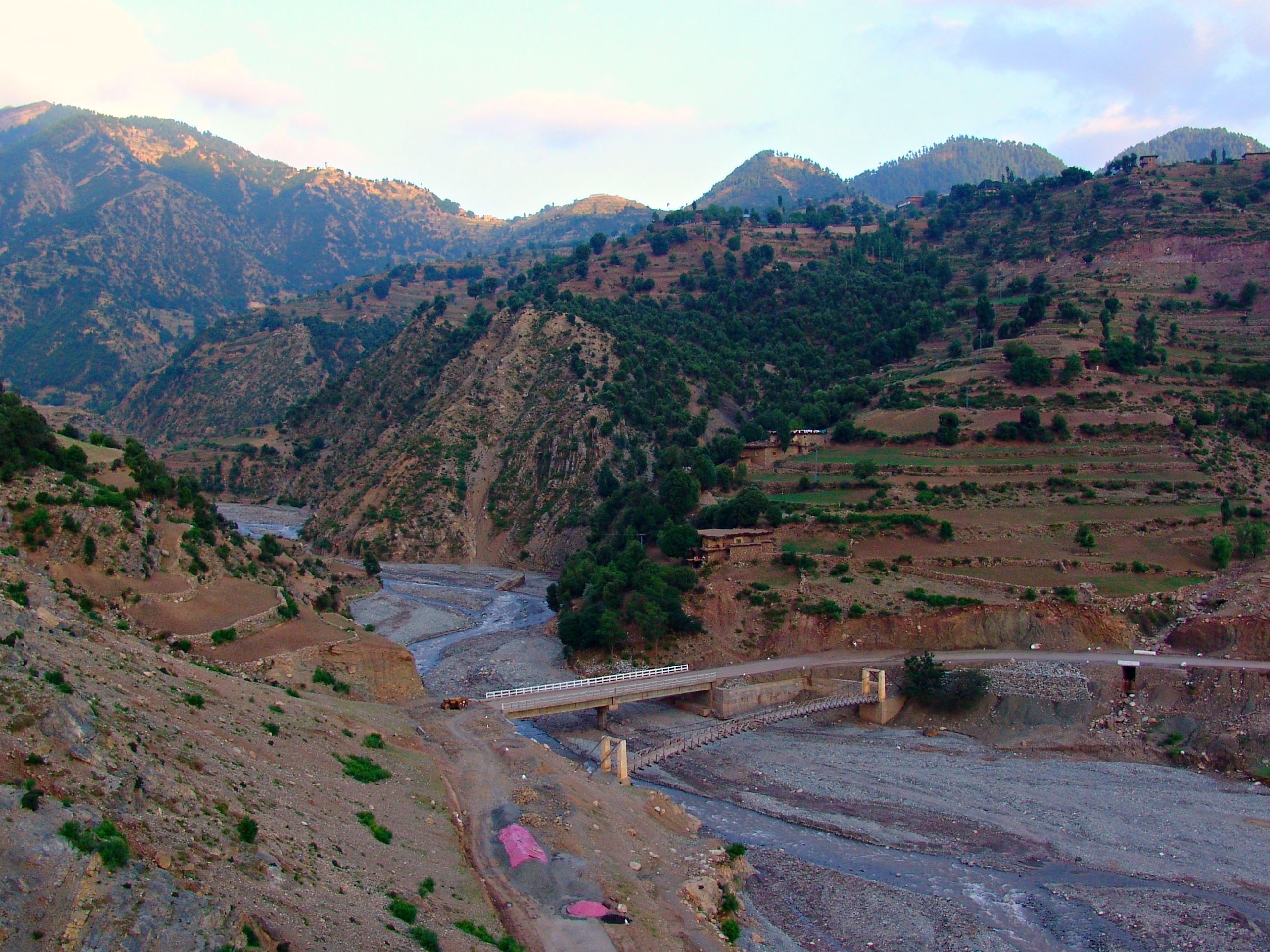
Bridge in Tari Mengal

With Chardis this was for from being the course left unsupported by their Kuchis they maintained a precarious existence at Alizai until even then they had to give three-fifths of their land to the Watizai Zaimushts in return for their assistance in a feud they had entered upon with Bilyamin. Consequently, the hills and the grazing grounds passed from the Turizun to the Zaimushtzun and as the other Zaimushts section being unopposed had settled themselves on the left bank below Sadda.

In the early 19th century the Kurram Valley was under the government of Kabul, and every five or six years a military expedition was sent to collect the revenue, the soldiers living meanwhile at free quarters on the people. It was not until about 1848 that the Turis were brought directly under the control of Kabul, when a governor was appointed, who established himself in Kurram. The Turis, being Shias, never liked Afghan rule.

During the second Afghan War, when Sir Frederick Roberts advanced by way of the Kurram Valley and the Peiwar Kotal to Kabul, the Turis lent him every assistance in their power, and in consequence, their independence was granted them in 1880.

The administration of the Kurram Valley was finally rendered to British authorities, at the request of the Turis themselves, in 1890. Technically it ranked, not as a British district, but as an agency or administered area. Two expeditions in the Kurram Valley also require mention:

(1) The Kurram expedition of 1856 under Brigadier-General Sir Neville Chamberlain. The Turis, on the first annexation of the Kohat district by the British, had repeatedly leagued with other tribes to infest the Miranzai valley, harbouring fugitives, encouraging resistance, and frequently attacking Bangash and Khattak villages in the Kohat district. Accordingly, in 1856 British forces numbering 4,896 troops traversed their country, and the tribe entered into engagements for future good conduct.

(2) The Kohat-Kurram expedition of 1897 under Colonel W. Hill. During the frontier risings of 1897 the inhabitants of the Kurram valley, chiefly the Massozai section of the Orakzais, were infected by the general excitement, and attacked the British camp at Sadda and other posts. A force of 14,230 British troops traversed the country, and the tribesmen were severely punished. In Lord Curzon's reorganization of the frontier in 1900–1901, British troops were withdrawn from the forts in the Kurram Valley and were replaced by the Kurram militia, reorganized in two battalions, and chiefly drawn from the Turi tribe.

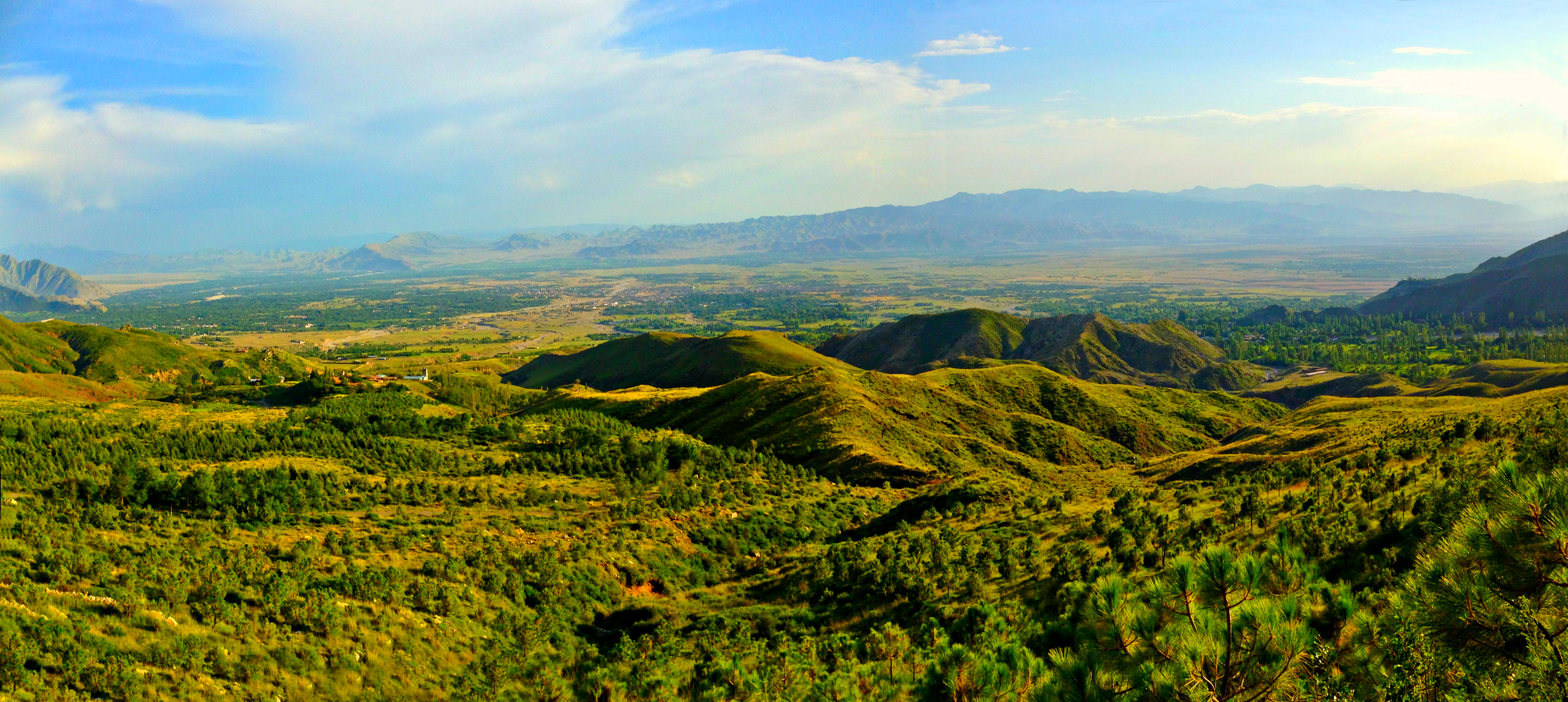
View at Makay near Malana

In recent years the Kurram Valley has once again assumed a strategic position and has been the site of intense Taliban activities. The armed forces of Pakistan extended their major offensive against Al-Qaeda and Taliban elements in FATA dubbed Operation Rah-e-Nijat to Kurram in December 2009.

=== Archeological findings ===
Ahmad Hasan Dani has recorded several findings in the North Waziristan area.

The nearest Kharoshti finds are the Kurram Casket inscription of the year 20, recovered from the Kurram Valley.

== Demographics ==
=== Population ===
Historical population
Year	Pop.	±% p.a.
1951	99,908	—
1961	121,199	+1.95%
1972	191,204	+4.23%
1981	249,681	+3.01%
1998	430,796	+3.26%
2017	705,362	+2.63%
2023	785,434	+1.81%

As of the 2023 census, Kurram district has 94,548 households and a population of 785,434. The district has a sex ratio of 107.51 males to 100 females and a literacy rate of 35.22%: 49.39% for males and 20.65% for females. 275,458 (35.07% of the surveyed population) are under 10 years of age. 45,471 (5.79%) live in urban areas.

=== Religion ===
Majority of people are mainly Sunni Muslims and nearly half the population of nearly 800,000 are Shia Muslims. remaining 2,642 (0.34%) people in the district are from religious minorities, mainly Christians.

=== Language ===
Pashto was the predominant language, spoken by 99.19% of the population. As per 2023 estimates by Tablue Public in Kurram District Shina is spoken by 0.50%, Hindko is spoken by 0.30% and Urdu is spoken by 0.36% of the population.

== Administrative divisions ==
Kurram District is currently subdivided into three Tehsils.

Tehsil	Name (Urdu) (Pashto)	Area (km²)	Pop. (2023)	Density (ppl/km²) (2023)	Literacy rate (2023)	Union Councils
Central Kurram Tehsil	(Urdu: تحصیل کرم وسطی)(Pashto: منځنی کرم تحصیل)	1,470	358,670	243.99	20.97%	
Lower Kurram Tehsil	(Urdu: تحصیل کرم زیریں)(Pashto: ښکته کرم تحصیل)	940	150,945	160.58	38.15%	
Upper Kurram Tehsil	(Urdu: تحصیل کرم بالا)(Pashto: پورتنۍ کرم تحصیل)	970	275,819	284.35	49.07%	

=== Parachinar Čoṇə́i (Cantonment) ===
Parachinar is the administrative headquarter of Kurram valley. It has offices of Deputy Commissioner, Assistant Commissioner, Kurram Police, and Kurram Militia, a part of the Frontier Corps (FC) and Pak Army. It is located northwest of the valley. This makes it a part of Upper Kurram. Governor cottage, Shalozan House, Circuit House and Passport office are also located in cantonment area. The name of Parachinar comes from 'Para' (Paarha), one of the tribes of the valley and 'Chinar', the maple trees which are found in abundance in the region and Parachinar in particular. The old name of Parchinar was Tutki and the inhabitants of Tutki were called Tutkiwal and even still, the Afghans call it Tutki. The town (sometimes listed as a city) of Parachinar has a population of around five thousand predominantly {Turi}, {Bangash} and {jaji}. The town has government hospital and many government schools.

=== Provincial Assembly ===
Member of Provincial Assembly	Party affiliation	Constituency	Year
Muhammad Riaz	Jamiat Ulema-e-Islam (F)	PK-108 Kurram-I	2018
Syed Iqbal Mian	Pakistan Tehreek-e-Insaf	PK-109 Kurram-II	2018

== Climate ==
Climate of the valley remains pleasant most of the summer however in winters minimum temperature is usually below freezing point, occasionally mercury drop below -10 degree Celsius. Parachinar is ranked the fourth-coldest location in Pakistan by the weather charts website "Climate-Charts" that uses data available from the World Meteorological Organization.

The northern and western heights of the valley receive snowfalls in winters. Much of the precipitations occur during spring and summer season. Autumn and winter are usually dry. Due to its climatic condition Kurram Agency is known for certain agricultural products throughout Pakistan such as peanut, bean, tomatoes and coarse rice. Wild olive trees are abundantly found along other trees and plants. Maple (chinar) is the identity of Kurram Agency especially Parachinar.

== Militancy ==
=== Taliban ===
Kurram was a stronghold of the TTP till 2008 when the Pakistani Army ordered a military operation in the Agency to flush out the militants. The military offensives Operation Khwakh Ba De Sham and Operation Koh-e-Safaid, ended in 2011 with the Lower and Upper Subdivisions of the agency falling back into the Pakistani control. In August, 2012, the Upper and Lower Subdivisions were de-notified as Conflict zones while as a military operation continued in Masozai Area of Central Kurram Agency. The writ of the Government of Pakistan was restored more or less whole of the Kurram Agency by 2012 as result of the military operations that pushed back militants back into the Afghanistan.

The Kurram faction of Haqqani Network is commanded by the notorious Fazal Saeed Haqqani who is known for his bloody ambushes against Shia community of Kurram Agency. He has thousands of armed supporters from local tribes of Bangash, Watizai, and Daudzai.

=== Sectarianism ===
Kurram Agency has become increasingly victimized by sectarian violence as tensions grew between the Shiites and Sunnis of the agency since the Soviet–Afghan War. During the war, Kurram was the safe passage for the both Shia and Sunni Mujahideen to carry out cross-border attacks on Soviet forces in Afghanistan, but at the end of the war, Sunni Mujahideen attacked the Shia villages. In retaliation, Shia Mujahideen launched retaliatory attacks on Sunni villages. Their fighting continues to this date, with major battles being fought in 2007.

== Notable people ==
- Allama Syed Arif Hussain al-Hussaini, revolutionary religious leader and politician
- Mufti Munir Shakir, Islamic preacher and member of the Pashtun National Jirga
- Muhammad Nawaz Irfani, religious leader and politician
- Ali Hadi, politician
- Hameed Hussain, politician
- Munir Khan Orakzai, politician
- Sajid Hussain Turi, politician
- Saqib Haider Karbalai, militant commander

== See also ==
- Peiwar Pass
- Bangash
- Thall
- Karakhela
- Tari Mangal

== Bibliography ==
- Martin, Gerald (1879). "Survey Operations of the Afghanistan Expedition; The Kurram Valley." In Proceedings of the Royal Geographical Society and Monthly Record of Geography, New Monthly Series, Vol. 1, No. 10 (Oct. 1879), pp. 617-645.
- Bowles, Gordon T. (1977). The People of Asia. London. Weidenfeld & Nicolson.
- Scott-Moncrieff, Major-General Sir George K. "The Roads of the North-West Frontier." Blackwood's Magazine, No. MCCCIV, Vol. CCXV, June 1924, pp. 743–757.
- Swinson, Arthur (1967). North-West Frontier. Frederick A. Praeger, New York, Washington.
