= Parachinar =

Parachinar: پاړه چنار; پارا چنار
- City
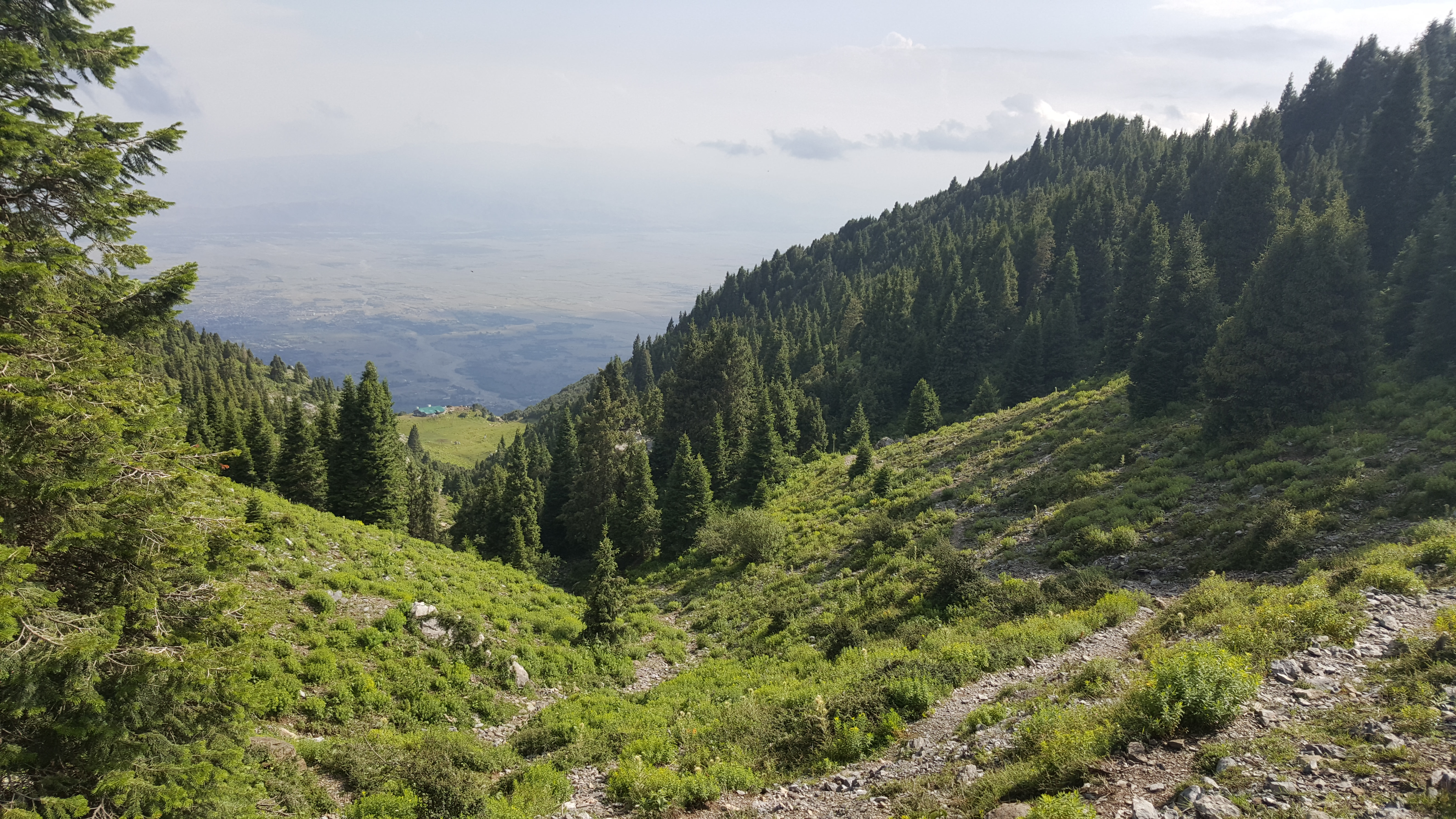
- A forest in Parachinar

- Location of Parachinar Parachinar (Pakistan)
- Coordinates: PK_type:city 33°54′N 70°6′E
- Country: Pakistan
- Province: Khyber Pakhtunkhwa
- District: Kurram
- Tehsil: Upper Kurram
- Elevation: 1,705 m (5,594 ft)

Population (2023)
  - City: 5,583
- Time zone: UTC+5 (PST)
- Postal code: 26300

Parachinar (Pashto: پاړه چنار; Urdu: پارا چنار) is a city and the headquarters of the Kurram District in the province of Khyber Pakhtunkhwa, Pakistan.

Parachinar, situated on the west of Peshawar, juts into the Paktia, Logar and Nangarhar provinces of Afghanistan. With a distance of 110 kilometres (68 mi) from the capital of Afghanistan, Kabul, Parachinar is the closest city in Pakistan to Kabul.

== History ==
According to the British colonial official C. M. Enriquez, in his book The Pathan Borderland (1910), Pare was a reputable Malak (leader) of the Parekhel tribe, a clan of the Shi'a Turi, a Pashtun tribe, who planted Poplar. Enriquez further adds that before modern settlements, the area was mostly arid. Parakhel tribesmen used to cultivate wheat in this desert area. During the wheat harvest, tents were pitched here, and in the shade of this poplar tree, jirgas and consultations were held.

=== Durand Line Agreement ===
In 1893, during the rule of Abdur Rahman Khan of Afghanistan, a Royal Commission for demarcating boundary between Emirate of Afghanistan and the territory of British Indian Empire negotiated terms, agreeing to the Durand line.

From the British side, the camp was attended by Sir Mortimer Durand and Sahibzada Abdul Qayyum, assistant political agent, Khyber Agency. The Afghanistan interest was represented by Sahibzada Abdul Latif and the governor of Khost, Sardar Shireendil Khan, represented King Amir Abdur Rahman Khan.

=== 2007 Kurram Agency conflict ===
Parachinar has seen Shi'a–Sunni conflict in the recent decades between the Shi'ite Turi tribe and their Sunni neighbours. Violent clashes in the region occurred in the following week until a ceasefire was reached on 12 April 2007.

=== Terrorist incidents ===
Parachinar has been the target of several terrorist attacks from 2007 to 2014 in which over 3,000 people have died, making it the second-most targeted Pakistani city by militants after Peshawar.

== Climate ==
Parachinar has a moderate humid subtropical climate (Köppen climate classification Cfa). Although the city's southeasterly aspect relative to the valley in which it is situated allows it to receive on occasions significant monsoonal rainfall, the most frequent source of rain is western depressions and related thunderstorms. During the winter, snowfall is common, and frosts occur on most mornings. Snow closes the Peiwar Pass, located on the Paktia border just over 20 km west of Parachinar, for up to five months per year.

Climate data for Parachinar (1991-2020)
| Month | Jan | Feb | Mar | Apr | May | Jun | Jul | Aug | Sep | Oct | Nov | Dec | Year |
|---|---|---|---|---|---|---|---|---|---|---|---|---|---|
| Record high °C (°F) | 20.6 (69.1) | 22.0 (71.6) | 29.0 (84.2) | 34.0 (93.2) | 37.4 (99.3) | 39.0 (102.2) | 36.4 (97.5) | 34.6 (94.3) | 36.2 (97.2) | 32.5 (90.5) | 26.3 (79.3) | 23.0 (73.4) | 39.0 (102.2) |
| Mean daily maximum °C (°F) | 9.9 (49.8) | 10.8 (51.4) | 15.3 (59.5) | 21.1 (70.0) | 26.4 (79.5) | 31.3 (88.3) | 30.9 (87.6) | 29.1 (84.4) | 26.6 (79.9) | 22.4 (72.3) | 16.8 (62.2) | 12.4 (54.3) | 21.1 (70.0) |
| Daily mean °C (°F) | 2.0 (35.6) | 3.6 (38.5) | 8.7 (47.7) | 14.1 (57.4) | 19.0 (66.2) | 23.8 (74.8) | 24.0 (75.2) | 22.5 (72.5) | 19.6 (67.3) | 15.1 (59.2) | 9.5 (49.1) | 4.6 (40.3) | 13.9 (57.0) |
| Mean daily minimum °C (°F) | −6.5 (20.3) | −3.8 (25.2) | 1.4 (34.5) | 7.1 (44.8) | 11.6 (52.9) | 16.1 (61.0) | 16.9 (62.4) | 15.8 (60.4) | 13.0 (55.4) | 7.8 (46.0) | 2.3 (36.1) | −3.0 (26.6) | 6.6 (43.9) |
| Record low °C (°F) | −15 (5) | −18.2 (−0.8) | −7 (19) | 0.0 (32.0) | 2.8 (37.0) | 8.0 (46.4) | 13.3 (55.9) | 12.8 (55.0) | 6.1 (43.0) | 3.4 (38.1) | −2.0 (28.4) | −7.2 (19.0) | −18.2 (−0.8) |
| Average precipitation mm (inches) | 69.1 (2.72) | 129.1 (5.08) | 174.6 (6.87) | 146.1 (5.75) | 106.6 (4.20) | 69.9 (2.75) | 114.1 (4.49) | 134.6 (5.30) | 80.8 (3.18) | 60.0 (2.36) | 36.8 (1.45) | 28.1 (1.11) | 1,149.8 (45.27) |
| Average precipitation days (≥ 1.0 mm) | 6.3 | — | 12.5 | 12.1 | 10.8 | 8.8 | 10.7 | 12.3 | 8.8 | 5.6 | 4.1 | 3.8 | — |
| Average relative humidity (%) | 47 | 53 | 56 | 54 | 46 | 38 | 54 | 63 | 53 | 45 | 53 | 48 | 51 |
| Mean monthly sunshine hours | 214.5 | 198.8 | 209.4 | 233.5 | 292.1 | 297.3 | 285.7 | 280.6 | 270.2 | 284.3 | 260.1 | 199.2 | 3,025.7 |
| Mean daily sunshine hours | 6.9 | 7.0 | 6.8 | 7.8 | 9.4 | 9.9 | 9.2 | 9.1 | 9.0 | 9.2 | 8.7 | 6.4 | 8.3 |
Source 1: NOAA (extremes, sun 1971-1990)
Source 2: Deutscher Wetterdienst (humidity 1959-1967, daily sun 1971-1990), Meteomanz (extremes since 2000)

== Demographics ==
Population

Historical population
| Year | Pop. | ±% p.a. |
|---|---|---|
| 1972 | 9,069 | — |
| 1998 | 8,042 | −0.46% |
| 2017 | 5,502 | −1.98% |
| 2023 | 5,583 | +0.24% |

As of the 2023 census, Parachinar had a population of 5,583.

== Education ==
FATA University plans to open a sub-campus at Parachinar. Parachinar also host KMU Institute of Health Sciences as an affiliated institute of Khyber Medical University. The institute is offering BS-Nursing and BS-Surgical under the umbrella of KMU.

== Transportation ==
The Thall–Parachinar road is the main road connecting Parachinar to the rest of the country.

Parachinar has an airport but currently it is non-functional. In the past there was a flight service between Peshawar and Parachinar.

== See also ==
- List of cities in Khyber Pakhtunkhwa by population
- Kohat Division
  - Hangu District
    - Doaba
    - Hangu
    - Tall
  - Karak District
    - Karak
  - Kohat District
    - Kohat
    - Lachi
    - Shakardara
  - Kurram District
    - Sadda
  - Orakzai District
- Pashto
- Battle of Tora Bora
- Saqib Haider Karbalai
