= Shah-i-Kot Valley =

Valley in Paktia province, eastern Afghanistan

The Shah-i-Kot Valley (Pashto: شاه کوټ) (also Shahi-Kot, Shah-e-Kot and other variant spellings) is a valley in the Paktia province of Afghanistan, southeast of the town of Zormat. The terrain in and around the valley is notoriously rugged, located at a mean altitude of 9,000 feet (2,700 m). Shah-i-Kot means "Place of the Kings" in Pashto and it has historically been a redoubt for Afghan guerrillas hiding from foreign invaders.

== History ==
The area was the scene of fierce fighting between the Afghan mujahideen rebels and Soviet forces during the Soviet–Afghan War, as the battle for Hill 3234.

In 2002 the valley was also the scene of Operation Anaconda, one of the largest battles of the War in Afghanistan.

== See also ==
- Khost-Gardez Pass
