= Gardez Airport =

Airport in Afghanistan

Gardez Airport د ګردېز هوایي ډګر
- IATA: GRG; ICAO: OAGZ

Summary
- Airport type: Public
- Serves: Gardez
- Location: Afghanistan
- Elevation AMSL: 7,790 ft / 2,374 m
- Coordinates: 33°37′54″N 069°14′21″E

Map
- Location of Gardez Airport in Afghanistan

Runways
Direction	Length		Surface
Direction	m	ft	Surface
03/21	1,664	5,460	Gravel
- Sources: Landings.com, motca.gov.af

Gardez Airport (IATA: GRG, ICAO: OAGZ) is a public use airport located near Gardez, Paktia, Afghanistan.

== See also ==
- List of airports in Afghanistan
