= Abdul Latif Mansour =

Afghan Energy and Water Minister since 2021

- عبداللطيف منصور

Ministry of Energy and Water
- Incumbent
- Assumed office 7 September 2021 (Note: Acting: 7 September 2021 – 15 August 2025)
- Prime Minister: Mohammad Hassan Akhund
- Supreme Leader: Hibatullah Akhundzada

Member of the Leadership Council of Afghanistan
- Incumbent
- Assumed office May 2002

Agriculture Minister of Afghanistan
- In office c. 1996–c. 2001
- Prime Minister: Mohammad Rabbani; Abdul Kabir
- Leader: Mohammed Omar
- Succeeded by: Abdul Rahman Rashid (2021)

Personal details
- Born: 1968 (age 57–58) Gerda Serai District, Paktia Province, Kingdom of Afghanistan
- Party: Taliban
- Occupation: Politician, Taliban member

Mullah Abdul Latif Mansour (Pashto: ملا عبداللطيف منصور [ˈabdʊl laˈtif manˈsur]; born 1968) is a politician in Afghanistan. He is currently serving as the Minister of Energy and Water, a position he held since 7 September 2021. He is considered a senior leader of the Taliban religious organization.

Mansour in the past was a member of the negotiation team in the Qatar office. He previously served as Minister of Agriculture, a member of the Taliban Supreme Council, a commander in eastern Afghanistan, and a shadow governor of Nangarhar Province during the previous Islamic Emirate of Afghanistan (1996–2001).

== Early life ==
Mansour was born in 1968 in the Gerda Serai District, Paktia Province. He is a nephew of Commander Nasrullah Mansoor and belongs to the Ghilzai tribe of Pashtuns. He spent most of his life in Pakistan, where he completed his Islamic studies at the Darul Uloom Haqqania in Akora Khattak, Khyber Pakhtunkhwa Province.

== See also ==
- Amir Khan Muttaqi
- Din Mohammad Hanif
