= Ahmadkhel District =

Afghanistan District

Coordinates: 33.8153°N 69.6339°E

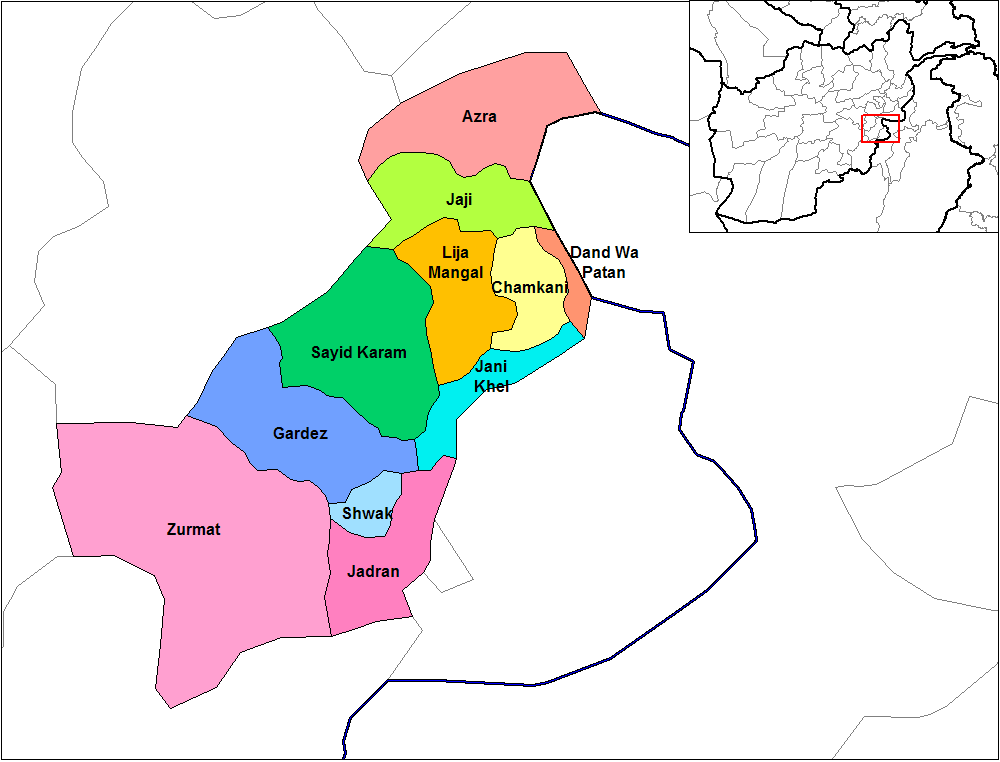
Districts of Paktia province

Ahmadkhel District (Pashto: احمد خېل ولسوالۍ) or Lazha Ahmadkhel is a district of Paktia Province, Afghanistan.
