= Dand Aw Patan District =

District of Paktia Province, Afghanistan

Dand Aw Patan District ډنډ او پټان ولسوالۍ
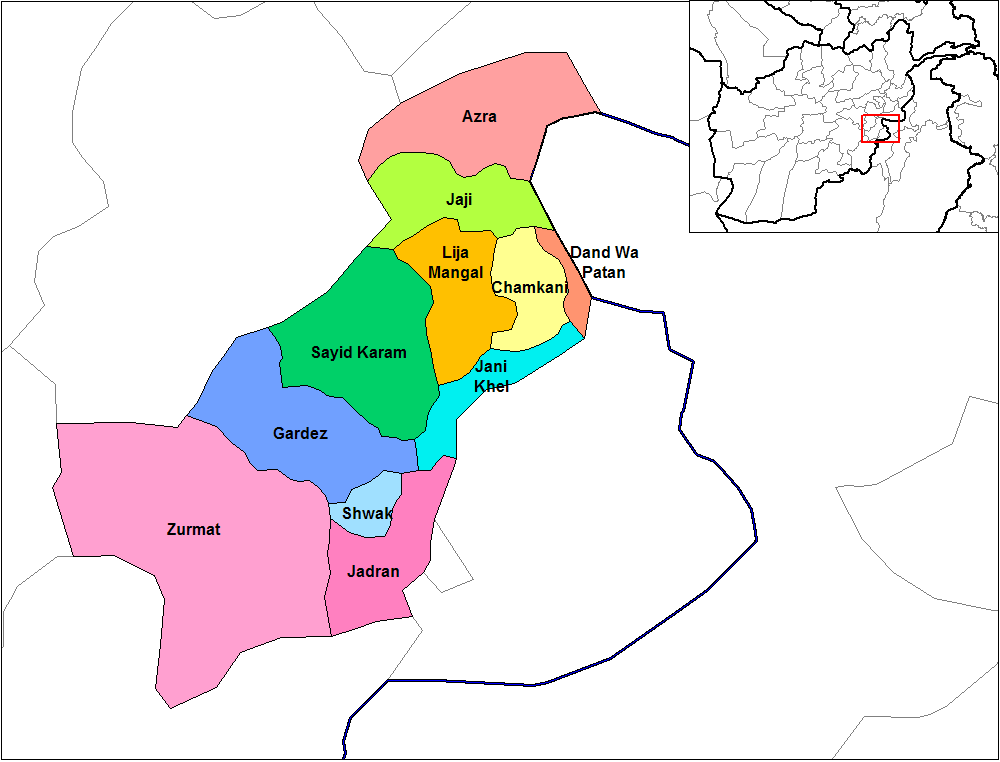
- Dand Aw Patan District in orange color in the northeast

- Location in Afghanistan
- Coordinates: 33°49′25″N 69°55′20″E
- Country: Afghanistan
- Province: Paktia
- Capital: Dand Aw Patan

Government
  - Type: District
- Elevation: 1,605 m (5,266 ft)

Population (2020)
  - Total: 30,551
- Time zone: UTC+04:30 (AFT)
- Postal code: 1351
- Main languages: Pashto

Dand Aw Patan District (Pashto: ډنډ او پټان ولسوالۍ ḍanḍ aw paṭān wuləswāləi) is located in the northeastern section of Paktia Province in Afghanistan. It has a population of around 30,551 local residents. The district is within the heartland of the Zazi tribe of Pashtuns.

Dand Aw Patan, which translates to Dand and Patan, is connected by road to Khost in the south and Gardez in the west. The district lies next to the Durand Line (Afghanistan-Pakistan border). To its north is Zazi District, to the east is Kurram District of Khyber Pakhtunkhwa in Pakistan, to the south is Janikhel District and to the west Tsamkani District. The border town known as Dand Aw Patan has an official border crossing with Khyber Pakhtunkhwa in Pakistan.

== Economy ==
Most residents of the district are involved in agriculture and trade. The major river in the district is the Kurram River, which flows water into Pakistan's Khyber Pakhtunkhwa and finally joins the Indus River.

== Major security incidents ==
On May 29, 2020, the Taliban insurgents stormed a check posts of the former Afghan Border Police (ABP). It was reported that 14 ABP personnel were killed in the attack and three others were injured. Two Taliban insurgents were also killed during the attack. The attack came soon after the end of the three-day Eid ceasefire announced by the Taliban, which lasted from 24 to 26 May 2020.

On March 4, 2022, at least two people were killed and 15 injured in an explosion that happened inside a mosque in Dand Aw Patan. Another more deadlier mosque attack happened on the same day in Peshawar, Pakistan.

== See also ==
- Districts of Afghanistan
- Land border crossings of Afghanistan
- Valleys of Afghanistan
