= Mirzaka District =

Mirzaka (Pashto: میرزکه) is a district of Paktia Province, Afghanistan. The estimated population in 2019 was 9,533.
