= Lazha Mangal District =

Lazha Mangal (Pashto: لزا منګل) or Lija proch Mangal is a district of Paktia Province, Afghanistan. The estimated population in 2019 was 20,891. The district is within the heartland of the Mangal tribe of Pashtuns.
