= Munir Mangal =

Afghan general (1950–2020)

Munir Mohamad Mangal
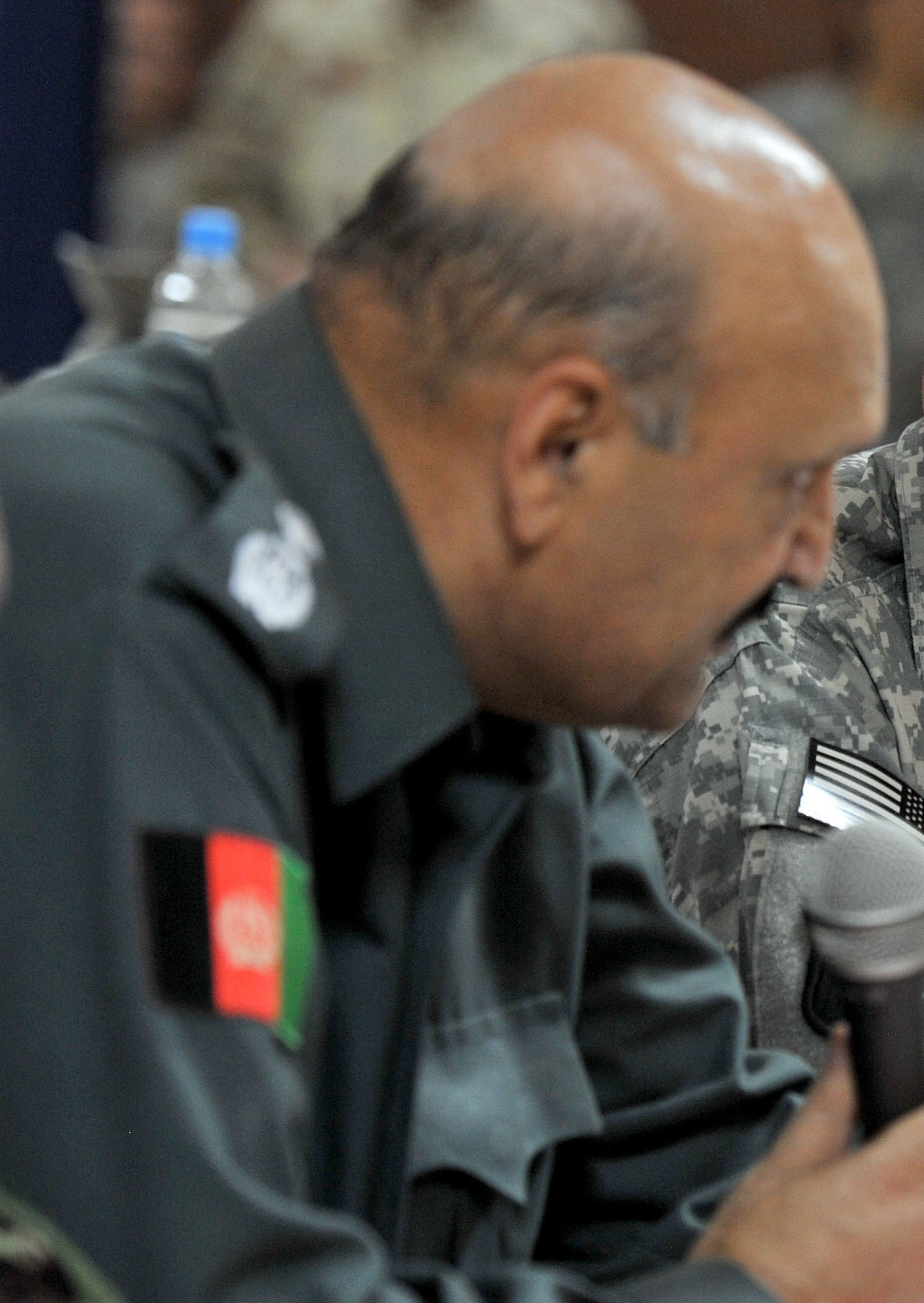
- General Munir Mangal (left) in July 2010

Deputy Minister of Interior Affairs for Security
- In office 23 March 2010 – 2 May 2016

Commander of the Afghan National Police
- In office 23 March 2010 – 2 May 2016

Personal details
- Born: 1950 Samkanay District, Paktia Province, Afghanistan
- Died: 2 May 2020 (aged 69–70)

Military service
- Allegiance: Islamic Republic of Afghanistan
- Branch/service: Afghan National Army
- Rank: General

Munir Mohamad Mangal (1950 – 2 May 2020) was an Afghan general whose professional military career spanned more than 40 years. Mangal served in high-level military and government positions, most latterly as the Commander of the Afghan National Police, before his retirement in 2016.

== Biography ==
Mangal was born in Samkanay District, Paktia Province, Afghanistan, in 1950. He was sent to Kabul, where he attended primary and military school. Mangal then went to the Soviet Union, where he completed a master's degree in military affairs.

In 1972, Mangal began his professional military career as a lieutenant in a Kabul-based artillery division. He rose to serve in both military positions under several Afghan governments over the course of his four decades as an officer in the Afghan Armed Forces, especially during the American-backed governments in the 2000s. Following the 2001 United States invasion of Afghanistan and the overthrow of the Taliban, Mangal helped to form the new Afghan National Army and served as a Corps Commander. He also became Deputy Minister of Interior for security.

Most recently, General Mangal was appointed Commander of the Afghan National Police. He was noted for careful planning in order to keep casualties with the National Police as low as possible. In one instance, Mangal and his colleague, General Ghulam Mujtaba Patang, were traveling in helicopter from Kandahar to Kabul over portion of Ghazni province that was controlled by the Taliban, when the aircraft malfunctioned and began to lose stability and altitude. The pilot asked if they should land in a Taliban-controlled area, but Mangal refused and ordered him to continue flying to Kabul, despite the risk of a crash, saying, "It's better to die in a crash than be taken hostage by the Taliban," according to Patang. Mangal retired from the National Police in 2016.

General Munir Mangal died from COVID-19 at his home in Kabul on 2 May 2020, at the age of 70. He is one of the highest-profile victims of the COVID-19 pandemic in Afghanistan, as well as the second member of his immediate family to die from coronavirus during the pandemic. One of his sons, who was a doctor, also died from the virus. Mangal was survived by his wife, two daughters, four sons, and 13 grandchildren.
