= Paktia University =

University in Gardez, Afghanistan

Coordinates: 33.63802°N 69.23315°E

- پوهنتون پکتیا / د پکتيا پوهنتون
- Established: 2004; 22 years ago
- Chancellor: Sheikh Mawlawi Sifatullah Haqqani
- Students: 4,500
- Location: Gardez, Paktia Province, Afghanistan
- Website: www.pu.edu.af

Paktia University (Note: Pashto: د پکتيا پوهنتون Dari: پوهنتون پکتیا) is a public university in Gardez, the capital of Paktia Province in eastern Afghanistan. It is under the Ministry of Higher Education, which is headquartered in Kabul. The current chancellor of the university is Sheikh Mawlawi Sifatullah Haqqani. His predecessor was Abdul Hakim Hamdi.

Paktia University has approximately 4,500 students. The majority of them are male students. There are approximately 145 professors. The university's acceptance rate was reported at 55%.

== History ==
Paktia University was established in 2004 after the Governor's office of Paktia Province presented a proposal to the Transitional Islamic State of Afghanistan about building a university in the province. According to the proposal, it was recognized as a non-profit and a bachelor graduate-based level foundation.

Until March 2009, the university shared a building with a teacher training college. Paktia University currently consists of at least nine faculties in the fields of agriculture and education, medical, law and political science, engineering, economics.

=== Merging of Paktia and Ariana universities ===
Aryana University was a private education institute in Peshawar, Pakistan, mainly for the Afghan refugees. After long requests by certain people, Aryana University was merged with Paktia University.

Before the merger, the institution had an enrollment of approximately 1,000 students in the faculties of Agriculture and Education. After the merger, the number of students was increased to approximately 3,000 with an addition of three more faculties: Medical, Engineering and Law.

== See also ==
- List of universities in Afghanistan
