= Khost-Gardez Pass =

Mountain pass in eastern Afghanistan

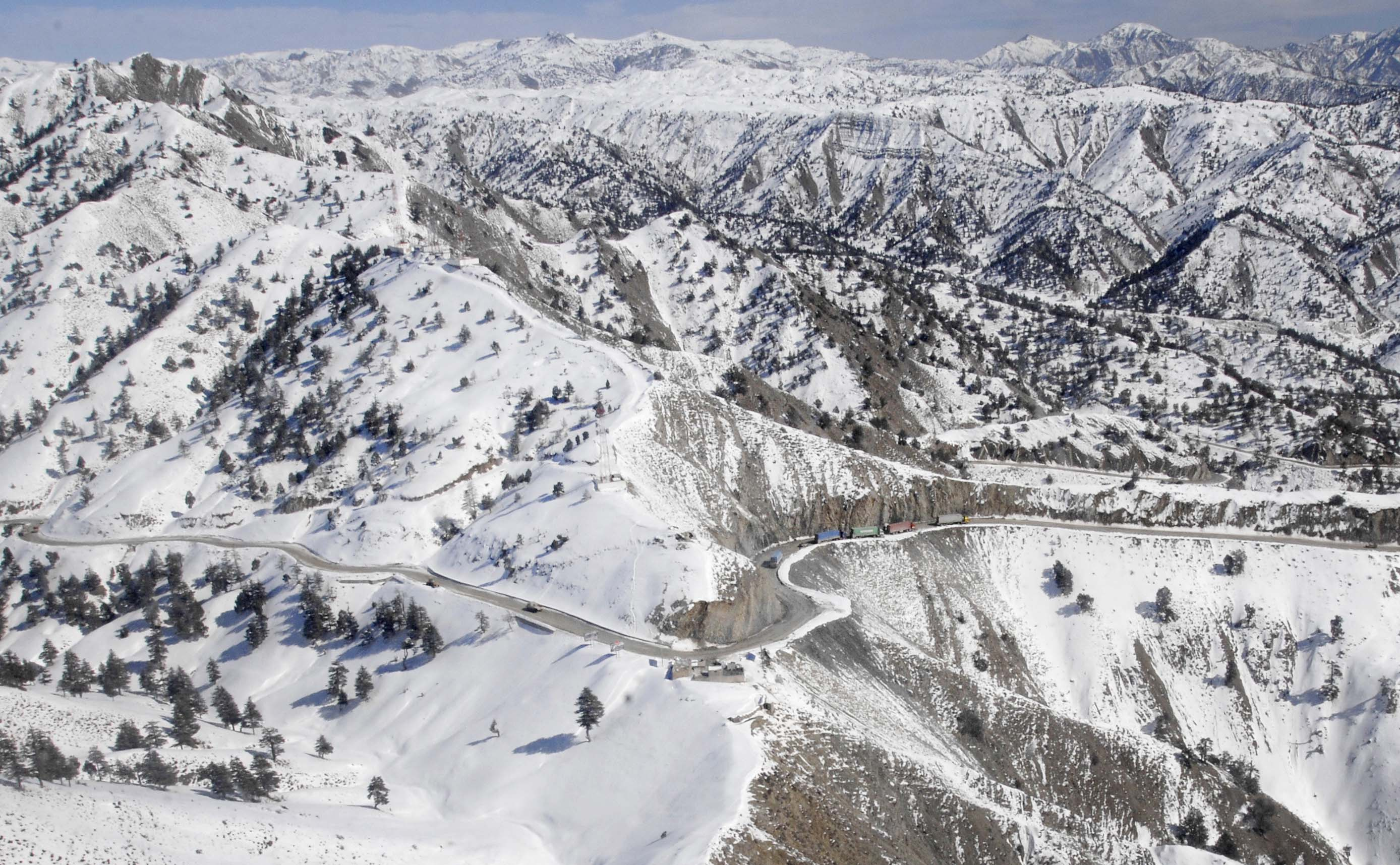
- The Khost-Gardez Pass (K-G Pass) in Afghanistan during the winter season
- Interactive map of Khost-Gardez Pass
- Elevation: 9,413 ft (2,869 m)
- Traversed by: Commercial and civilian traffic

Location
- Location: Afghanistan
- Range: Sulaiman Mountains
- Coordinates: 33°28′39.9″N 69°22′17.3″E

The Khost-Gardez Pass (Pashto: د خوست ګردېز لاره) frequently abbreviated as the K-G Pass, and known locally as the Seti-Kandow Pass, or the Satukandav Pass by Soviet forces, is the main land route connecting Khost, the capital of Khost Province, and Gardez, the capital of Paktia province, in eastern Afghanistan. The pass currently consists of a rutted dirt road, though it is slowly being improved by construction crews as part of the international reconstruction effort in Afghanistan.

== History ==
The Khost-Gardez Pass has been in use since antiquity, serving as one of the main routes connecting Kabul to locations in the Indian subcontinent. During the Soviet occupation the pass was a frequent location for mujahideen attacks on Soviet convoys. Portions of the pass were paved or otherwise improved by German international development efforts during the 1970s, prior to the Soviet occupation. Remnants of these improvements exist in the form of culverts and some asphalt on the Gardez side of the pass. Because the pass serves to connect Khost to Gardez, and in effect Khost to the rest of Afghanistan it has been the scene of many battles. During the Soviet–Afghan War the pass was controlled by the mujaheddin resulting in the decade long Siege of Khost. In the War in Afghanistan, control of the pass was instrumental since it allowed for resupply of Khost city as well as FOB Salerno and FOB Chapman.

== Soviet–Afghan War ==
The path was a large focal point during the Soviet–Afghan War. The Soviet forces operated a large base in Khost province. However, the mujaheddin controlled the path throughout much of the war. This led to the Siege of Khost, in which land access to the city was largely impossible and the area relied on aerial resupply, which was expensive and allowed for only lightweight supplies that could be carried by aircraft. As the mujaheddin acquired anti-air weapons even the aerial resupply of the area came into jeopardy. To break the siege the Soviet forces engaged in Operation Magistral to clear the Khost-Gardez path. The operation was the last major offensive of the war and involved 20,000 Soviet troops supported by 9,000 forces of the Republic of Afghanistan. Being in close proximity to Pakistan, the mujaheddin themselves were well supplied and numbered between 10,000 and 20,000. The mujaheddin mined much of the narrow path, stalling the Soviet advance as they had to slowly clear the route. Soviet forces also dropped mobile airborne units on the surrounding mountains to secure the path. One of the units consisted of elements of the 345th Independent Guards Airborne Regiment which was to secure a hill. This led to the Battle for Hill 3234, which was to become one of the more famous battles of the war. During the battle the 39 soldiers of the 345th Independent Guards Regiment held off waves of advancing fighters that tried to retake the hill. It is estimated that up to 400 mujaheddin may have been involved in the battle. Moreover, they were supported by Pakistan's Special Services Group. By January 1988 the Soviet ground forces entered Khost for the first time since 1981 as the mujaheddin retreated from the pass. Despite Khost being relieved, Soviet forces soon withdrew from the area, and within a year they withdrew entirely from Afghanistan; the area was quickly retaken by the mujaheddin. During the Soviet occupation parts of the pass were paved. However, these improvements were quickly destroyed either by war, the mujaheddin so that it would be easier to place mines against Soviet forces, or by failure to keep up the pavement. Khost remained under siege after the Soviet withdrawal in 1989.

== Afghan Civil War ==
After the Soviet Union withdrew its fores from the area, the path between Khost and Gardez once again became impassable. Subsequently, the Soviet Union withdrew entirely from Afghanistan and during the Afghan Civil War Khost continued to be under siege. The Republic of Afghanistan military was initially successful in their campaigns, however with the collapse of the USSR their funding and support quickly evaporated leading to a quick downfall of the regime. The Islamic Unity of Afghanistan forces eventually lifted the siege and took control of Khost. During the subsequent rise of the Taliban both Gardez and Khost came under their rule.

== U.S. War in Afghanistan ==
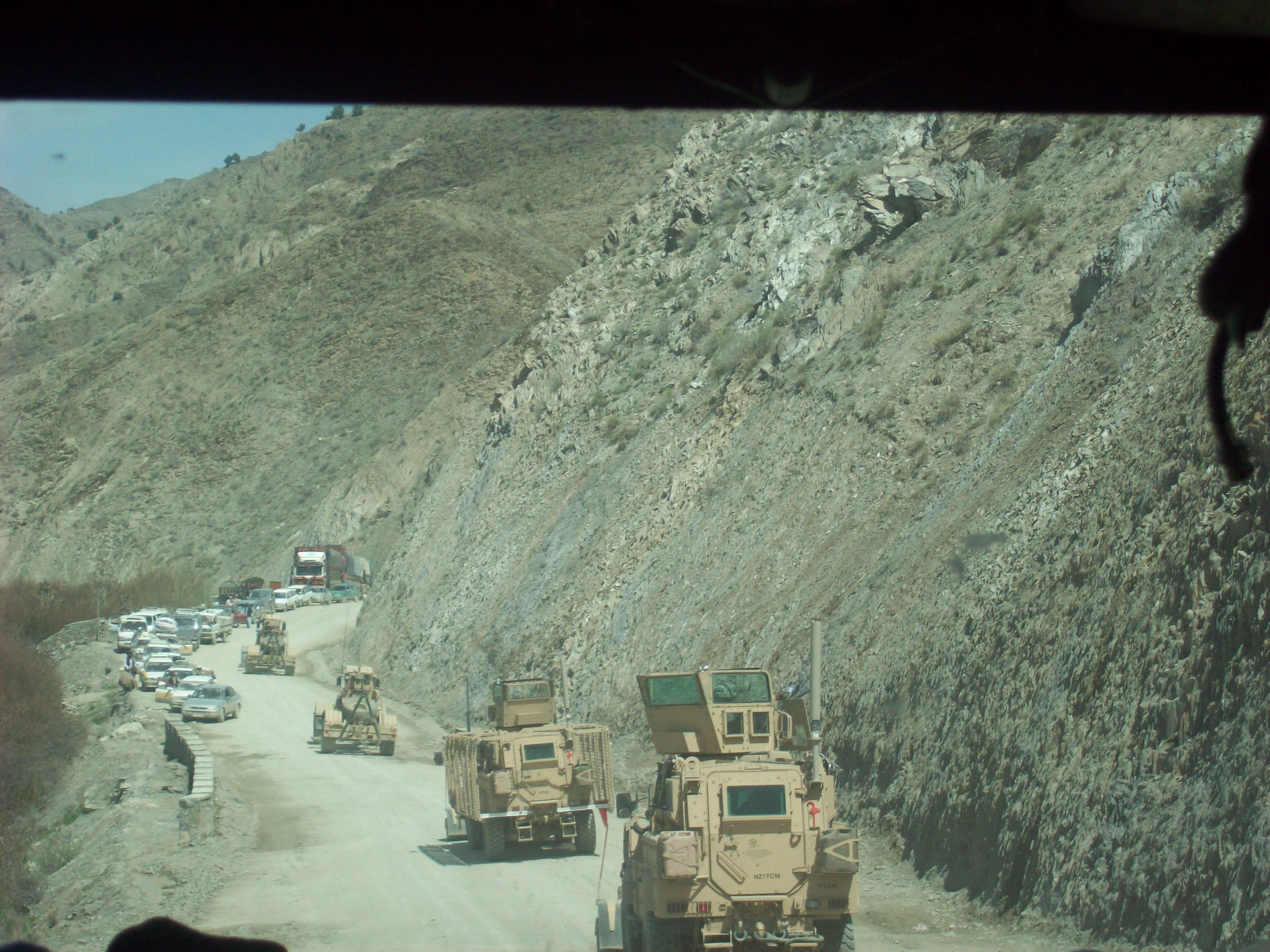
US Sapper Forces Clearing the Khost-Gardez pass

The Khost-Gardez pass was an important hot spot during the War in Afghanistan. Some notable operations took place near the area including the famous Battle of Tora Bora which occurred only 30 miles north of the pass. Likewise the pass is adjacent to the notorious Shah-i-Kot Valley, which lies south of the Paktia entrance of the pass. Initially the United States had a small presence in the country, between 2001 and 2007 less than 20,000 troops were normally stationed at any given time in the country. The city and province of Gardez were generally more peaceful than Khost and the road leading from the city of Gardez to the opening of the pass was improved. Because the pass is instrumental in connecting Khost to the rest of Afghanistan efforts to improve it are under way. Through much of its length the pass is a two track dirt road, mountain on one side and cliff on the other, with the cliff often being several hundred meters high.

Combined with its geographical danger the road is also a prime target for ambushes on troops traveling through the area, with insurgents being able to set up ambush positions above the pass and across the cliff on nearby mountains, assaulting convoys traveling the restricted pass. In 2003 Task Force 1-501 PIR were the first US troops to convoy the road through the pass. Moreover, US troops normally rely on the Bell OH-58 Kiowa which performs poorly in the high altitude, cold, and rugged conditions of the pass, therefore the Boeing AH-64 Apache is usually used to escort units through the pass when air support is needed. Due to numerous mountains around the pass artillery support is also often unavailable, moreover insurgents often throw IEDs from high positions on passing convoys. The high cliffs around the pass also do not allow many gunners to effectively use their weapons as insurgents may at too steep of an angle for the muzzle of the weapon to engage them. To better secure the pass numerous installations were built along it with Firebase Wilderness being the largest one. Other smaller installations house soldiers that are stationed there temporarily rotating in from larger bases.

While Gardez is generally peaceful Khost is much more volatile. Khost province was home to several major bases including FOB Salerno, Camp Clark, and FOB Chapman. US troops withdrew from Salerno in 2013, it operated from 2002 to 2013 and was known as Rocket City due to constant indirect fire that the base received. FOB Chapman was built around the Soviet airfield in the area and houses CIA operations, the base was attacked in 2009 when an Afghan working with the CIA detonated a suicide vest. This was the largest loss of life for the CIA since the 1983 United States embassy bombing. Sgt. Bowe Bergdahl, the only POW in the War in Afghanistan was abducted in Khost province.

Throughout the war the US forces have used different tactics than the Soviet forces in the area. The Soviets relied on brigade and division sized elements to conduct major operations using heavy equipment such as the BTR-80 and T-70. US forces use small platoon size elements that rely on fast movement using the Humvee and dismount forces and are covered by close air support. Although initially use of IEDs in the pass was not an issue as they were in the rest of the country they became more prevalent and US troops switched to using MRAPs. While the Soviet Union often used convoys of several hundred vehicles to secure the pass US forces use small 8-15 vehicle convoys, moreover US troops were able to establish permanent posts along the pass so that in case a convoy is not able to make it through the pass in a day due to insurgent activity, or other factors, they are able to stop at a nearby base. FOB Salerno which is located near the city of Khost housed two route clearance platoons which were responsible for clearing the pass.

Control of the pass was instrumental during the war, as losing it would mean relying on the airfield at FOB Salerno to resupply Khost. The dirt airfield was prone to washing out so supplies could not always be delivered. Although the Taliban forces remained a large threat to the pass weather was also a factor as during major rain storms parts of the pass can become impassable, needing several days to be repaired. The climate difference between the two sides of the pass is quite noticeable as its peak near Gardez is about 10,000 ft above sea level while the Khost entrance is only 3,300 ft.

== Geography ==
The Khost-Gardez Pass ascends approximately 2,000 feet (610 m) from the Gardez river valley to its highest point, then winds down 4,000 feet (1,200 m) to the floor of the Khost bowl. The pass runs through multiple administrative and tribal areas, including the districts of Swak, Gerda Serai and Waze Zadran in Paktia, and Besmil in Khost. The pass receives a high amount of snowfall in winter months, but is largely arid during the rest of the year. Vegetation consists of scrub and small trees, with small irrigated areas existing in the lower river areas.

== People ==
The territory is inhabited mostly by the Pashtun people, although there are some Tajiks. The Zadran tribe is believed to be the predominant Pashtun tribe living in the K-G Pass area.

== Security ==
The security situation in the Khost-Gardez Pass remains precarious. Attacks by militant elements remain frequent, and Coalition and Afghan forces and civilians are occasionally killed by IEDs. The Afghan National Security Forces (ANSF) and the U.S. military forces maintain outposts at various points in the pass to provide security for travellers.
