= Gardez =

Gardez گردېز
- Provincial capital
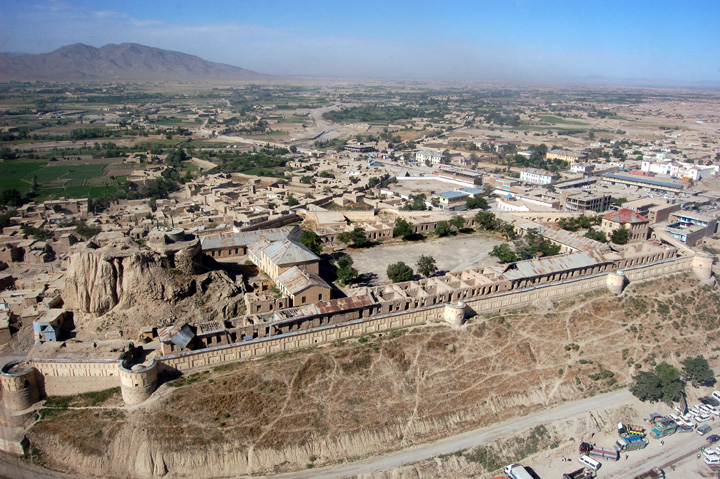
- The Paktia Bala Hisar (fortress)

- Location in Afghanistan
- Coordinates: 33°36′00″N 69°13′01″E
- Country: Afghanistan
- Province: Paktia
- District: Gardez

Government
  - Type: Municipality
  - Mayor: Mulawai Habibullah Akhundzada

Area
  - Land: 62 km^{2} (24 sq mi)
- Elevation: 2,300 m (7,500 ft)

Population (2025)
  - Provincial capital: 105,278
  - Density: 1,700/km^{2} (4,400/sq mi)
  - Urban: 31,866
  - Rural: 73,412
- Time zone: UTC+04:30 (Afghanistan Time)
- ISO 3166 code: AF-GDZ

Gardez (Note: Pashto: گردېز, romanized: Gardez [gaɾ.d̪ez]; Dari: گردیز, romanized: Gardēz [gäɾ.d̪éːz]) is a city in southeastern Afghanistan, serving as the capital of Paktia Province. It is within the jurisdiction of Gardez District and has an estimated population of 105,278 people. Mulawai Habibullah Akhundzada is the current mayor of the city. His predecessor was Mohammad Sharif Elham.

Gardez is home to Paktia University, which is located in the northern part of the city. The Gardez Airport is in the same area of the city. Gardez also has a number of bazaars, business centers, public parks, banks, hotels, restaurants, mosques, hospitals, universities, and places to play sports or just relax. The city is connected by a road network with Aryob to the northeast, Khost to the southeast, Sharan to the southwest, Ghazni to the west, and Puli Alam to the northwest.

Named after 'mountain fortress' in Middle Persian, Gardez was established at a junction between two important roads that cut through a huge alpine valley. Surrounded by the Sulaiman Mountains, it is a city of commerce for a huge area of eastern Afghanistan and has been a strategic location for armies throughout the country's long history. Observation posts believed to be built by Alexander the Great are still crumbling on the hilltops just outside the city limits.

== Geography ==
Gardez is at an elevation of approximately 2,300 m (7,500 ft) above sea level, making it the third-highest provincial capital in Afghanistan, and is not far from the Tora Bora region of caves and tunnels. The "old town" is located at the foot of the Paktia Bala Hisar fortress, which is currently being rebuilt. The city receives water from the upper course of the Gardez River, which flows southwest into the Ab-i Istada lake in the Nawa District of Ghazni Province.

Gardez is around 70 km (43 mi) northwest of Khost and 100 km (62 mi) south of Kabul. The city is at a junction between two important roads, one connecting Kabul with Khost and the other linking Ghazni with Dand-Patan District next to the Durand Line (Afghanistan-Pakistan border).

Gardez is administratively divided into approximately 6 city districts (nahias), covering a land area of 62 km^{2} (24 sq mi) or 6,174 ha (23.84 sq mi). It is predominately non-built up area with agriculture as the largest land use at 39%. Residential area accounts for almost half of built-up area and Districts 1-4 consist of the densest housing.

=== Climate ===
Gardez has a cold semi-arid climate (Köppen climate classification BSk) with dry summers and cold, snowy winters. Precipitation is low, and mostly falls in winter and spring.

Climate data for Gardez
Month	Jan	Feb	Mar	Apr	May	Jun	Jul	Aug	Sep	Oct	Nov	Dec	Year
Record high °C (°F)	14.6 (58.3)	12.7 (54.9)	24.7 (76.5)	26.5 (79.7)	31.0 (87.8)	34.5 (94.1)	34.8 (94.6)	33.8 (92.8)	30.0 (86.0)	27.8 (82.0)	20.0 (68.0)	17.6 (63.7)	34.8 (94.6)
Mean daily maximum °C (°F)	1.0 (33.8)	2.3 (36.1)	8.8 (47.8)	16.8 (62.2)	22.2 (72.0)	27.8 (82.0)	29.6 (85.3)	29.0 (84.2)	25.1 (77.2)	18.6 (65.5)	11.9 (53.4)	5.7 (42.3)	16.6 (61.8)
Daily mean °C (°F)	−6.1 (21.0)	−4.7 (23.5)	2.7 (36.9)	10.1 (50.2)	15.1 (59.2)	20.6 (69.1)	22.0 (71.6)	21.1 (70.0)	16.7 (62.1)	10.5 (50.9)	3.8 (38.8)	−2.2 (28.0)	9.1 (48.4)
Mean daily minimum °C (°F)	−11.7 (10.9)	−10.1 (13.8)	−2.3 (27.9)	4.0 (39.2)	7.9 (46.2)	12.5 (54.5)	14.9 (58.8)	13.8 (56.8)	8.4 (47.1)	2.3 (36.1)	−2.8 (27.0)	−7.6 (18.3)	2.4 (36.4)
Record low °C (°F)	−31 (−24)	−30.0 (−22.0)	−19.6 (−3.3)	−6.4 (20.5)	−2.5 (27.5)	4.7 (40.5)	9.0 (48.2)	4.5 (40.1)	0.5 (32.9)	−9.3 (15.3)	−13.2 (8.2)	−27.8 (−18.0)	−31 (−24)
Average precipitation mm (inches)	35.8 (1.41)	61.7 (2.43)	65.5 (2.58)	50.4 (1.98)	21.7 (0.85)	4.8 (0.19)	15.8 (0.62)	7.5 (0.30)	0.9 (0.04)	5.8 (0.23)	12.4 (0.49)	33.2 (1.31)	315.5 (12.43)
Average rainy days	1	1	6	9	6	2	3	2	0	2	3	1	36
Average snowy days	8	8	5	1	0	0	0	0	0	0	1	6	29
Average relative humidity (%)	69	72	66	58	47	39	49	51	45	45	51	60	54
Mean monthly sunshine hours	171.5	166.8	214.2	242.9	316.2	357.5	343.0	335.8	329.8	302.4	253.9	200.4	3,234.4
Source: NOAA (1970-1983)

== History ==
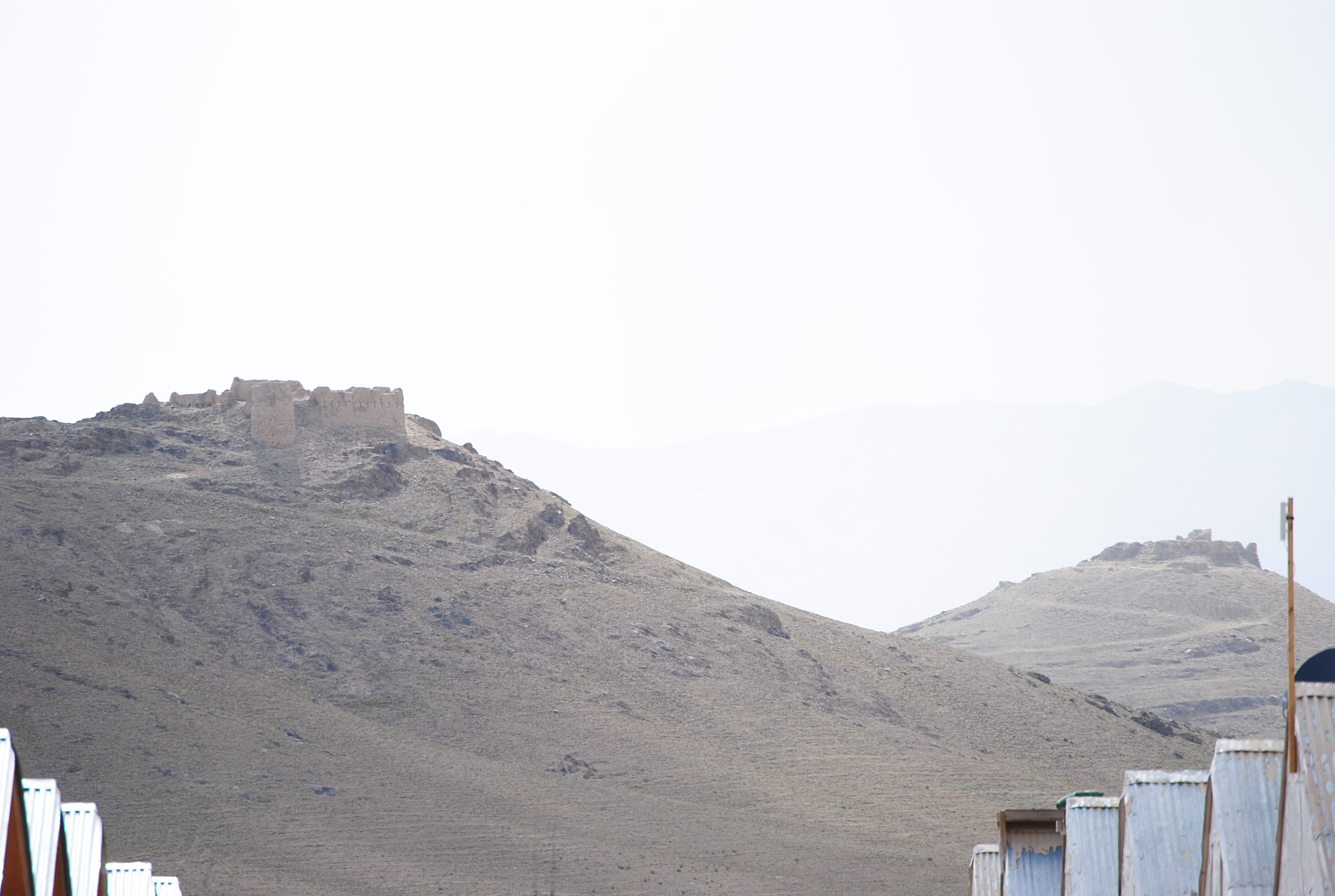
Hilltop outposts attributed to Alexander the Great

Gardez is an ancient settlement, located within a large intramountainous depression in the Sulaiman Mountains of eastern Afghanistan. Archaeological discoveries, including Greek, Sassanid, Hephthalite, and Hindu Shahi coins give an insight into the rich history of Gardez. A 7th century Ganesha statue has also been discovered in Gardez.

During the 8th century, the Lawik rulers of the region adopted Islam. They formerly practiced either Buddhism or Hinduism, since they were associated with the Buddhist Kabul Shahis, and later with the Hindu Shahis (based in Gandhara, in present-day north-west Pakistan). Gardez later became a center of Kharijism and suffered several attacks by anti-Kharijite military chiefs. According to Zayn al-Akhbar, written by historian Abu Sa'id Gardezi, Abu Mansur Aflah Lawik was reduced to a tributary status in Gardez by Emir Ya'qub ibn al-Layth al-Saffar in 877. However, the city remained under Lawik rule for about a century more. Around 975, Samanid-appointed governor Bilgetegin besieged Gardez but was killed by Lawiks during the attack. After the rule of the Ghaznavids ended, the city fell to the Ghurid dynasty.

During the 16th-century, Gardez was renowned for its multi-storied houses—as mentioned by Babur in his Baburnama—and was the headquarter of the Kabul tūmān of "Zurmut", whose people were "Aūghān-shāl".

In 1960, the German government had their biggest rural development project with a budget of 2.5 million Deutsch Marks for the development of Paktia. This led to an economic boom in the 1970s. The number of shops in the bazar increased from 117 in 1965 to more than 600 in 1977. The project became unsuccessful after the communist regime came to power in 1979. The communists lost control of most of Paktia during the 1980s as the country plunged into war with only Gardez remaining in government control. By 1996 the entire region was in Taliban control. In 2002, the city and surroundings was attacked by local warlord Pacha Khan Zadran, who was chosen by Hamid Karzai's administration as the governor of Paktia only to be refused by tribal elders.

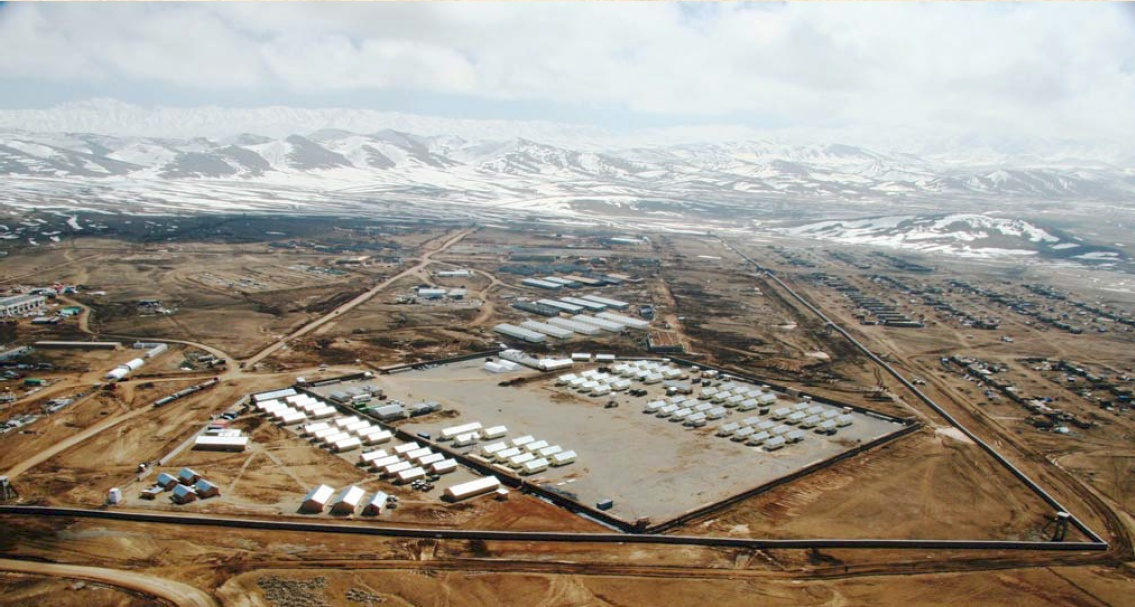
Forward Operating Base Gardez in 2007

Gardez was once the home of the 3rd Corps of the Afghan Army. By 2002, the corps theoretically incorporated 14th Division, 30th Division, 822nd Brigade, Border Brigades, and approximately 800 men in the governor's force in the provinces of Paktia, Ghazni, Paktika, and Khost. The corps was disbanded around 2003-2005 and replaced in the Afghan National Army by the 203rd Corps.

On 4 January 2002, the first American soldier to die in the War in Afghanistan, Sergeant First Class Nathan Chapman, was killed in Gardez. The first Provincial Reconstruction Team in Afghanistan was established next to Gardez in March 2003, headed by the US Army along with a U.S. Agency for International Development representative, Randolph Hampton.

On 14 May 2020, a suicide truck bomber killed five civilians and injured at least 29 others near a court in Gardez. The Taliban claimed this as a revenge attack against the Afghan government, after President Ashraf Ghani blamed the group for the attack at a maternity hospital in Kabul two days earlier; the Taliban denied responsibility for the hospital attack.

On 14 August 2021, Gardez was seized by Taliban fighters, becoming the nineteenth provincial capital to be captured as part of the wider 2021 Taliban offensive. The government recently decided to build a new township for its needy citizens who are returning from neighboring countries.

== Demographics ==
Gardez has an estimated population of 105,278 people. In 2015 there were 7,849 dwelling units in the city. In 2004 the population was estimated at 73,131 people. A summary report from the Ministry of Rural Rehabilitation and Development provided that ethnic Pashtuns made up around 70% of the population of Gardez while the Tajik community accounted for some 30%. Majority of the Pashtuns are of the Ahmadzai sub-tribe or clan. There were some Hindu and Sikh shopkeepers reported in 1979.

== Economy ==
Most residents of Gardez are involved in agriculture, trade and transport. Pine nuts are among the noteworthy export products of the area. The city has a small number of factories. Some residents go to work in Kabul or in other Afghan cities.

== Education ==
There are a number of public and private schools in Gardez. There are also a number of universities. One of them is Paktia University, which is located in the northern part of the city, next to the Kabul-Gardez Highway.

== Sports ==
The most popular sports in Gardez are cricket, football, futsal and volleyball.

== Notable people ==
- Abu Sa'id Gardezi, 11th-century geographer and historian
- Shah Gardez, 11th-century Sufi saint who established himself in Multan, Pakistan
- Mohammad Najibullah, President of Afghanistan from 1987 to 1992
- Khalaf ibn Ahmad, the last Saffarid Emir who died in Gardez in 1009 where he had been sent after the Ghaznavid conquest

== See also ==
- List of cities in Afghanistan

== Literature ==
- S. Radojicic, Report on Hydrogeological Survey of Paktya Province, Kabul, UNICEF, 1977
- C.E. Bosworth, "Notes on the Pre-Ghaznavid History of Eastern Afghanistan", in The Islamic Quarterly IX, 1965
