= Djelaludin Sharityar =

Afghan footballer

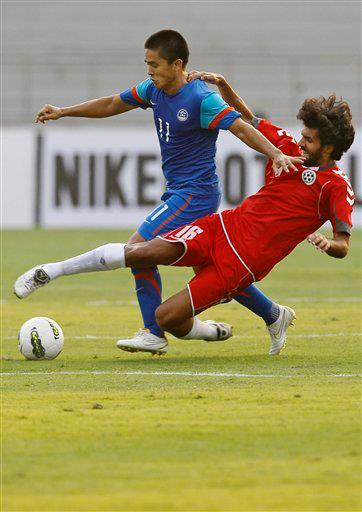
- Sharityar in red uniform playing against Sunil Chhetri and India during the 2011 SAFF Championship

Personal information
- Full name: Djelaludin Sharityar
- Date of birth: 15 March 1983 (age 43)
- Place of birth: Zadran, Paktia Province, Afghanistan
- Position: Defensive midfielder

Youth career
- 1998–2001: VfL Wolfsburg

Senior career*
Years	Team	Apps	(Gls)
2001–2003	FC Kreuzlingen		
2003–2006	FC Konstanz		
2006–2007	FC Emmendingen	31	(1)
2007–2008	SpVgg Weiden	17	(0)
2009	1. FC Schweinfurt 05	13	(1)
2009–2010	APEP Pitsilia	18	(0)
2010–2011	Ethnikos Achna	12	(0)
2011–2013	Hidd SCC	29	(2)
2014	1. FC Schweinfurt 05	7	(0)
2015–2017	Manama Club	16	(0)
2017	→ Mumbai FC (loan)	7	(0)

International career^{‡}
2007–2015	Afghanistan	38	(1)
- * Club domestic league appearances and goals as of 11 March 2017 ‡ National team caps and goals as of 7 June 2014

Djelaludin Sharityar (Pashto: جلال‌الدین شریعت‌یار) is an Afghan footballer who plays as a defender and was the captain of the Afghanistan national football team. He was a member of the national team from 2007 to 2015.

His career started in 1998 in Germany when as a youth he played for VfL Wolfsburg, he then joined Swiss club FC Kreuzlingen in 2001, then moved back to Germany in 2003 when he joined FC Konstanz and then FC Emmendingen in 2006, SpVgg Weiden in 2007 and 2008, 1. FC Schweinfurt 05 in 2009, and then in Cyprus, APEP Pitsilia in 2009. Until 2013 he played for Hidd SCC in Bahrain. In 2014, he returned to play for 1. FC Schweinfurt 05 again. In 2015 Sharityar signed a contract with Manama Club (Bahrain Premier League). Manama Club is one of the best teams in Bahrain and will take part in the GCC Champions League (Gulf Cup for Clubs) this season.

== Club career stats ==
Last update: 22 April 2014

Club performance			League		Cup		League Cup		Continental		Total	
Season	Club	League	Apps	Goals	Apps	Goals	Apps	Goals	Apps	Goals	Apps	Goals
Germany			League		DFB-Pokal		Other		Europe		Total	
2005–06	FC Konstanz	Verbandsliga Südbaden					-		-			
2006–07	FC Emmendingen	Oberliga Baden-Württemberg	31	1			-		-			
2007–08	SpVgg Weiden	Oberliga Bayern	17	0			-		-			
2008–09	1. FC Schweinfurt 05	Regionalliga Bayern	17	0			-		-			
Cyprus			League		Cypriot Cup		League Cup		Europe		Total	
2009–10	APEP Pitsilia	Cypriot First Division	18	0			-		-			
2010–11	Ethnikos Achna	Cypriot First Division	12	0			-		-			
Bahrain			League		Bahrain Cup		League Cup		Asia		Total	
2011–13	Hidd SCC	Bahraini Premier League	29	2				-		-		
Germany			League		DFB-Pokal		Other		Europe		Total	
2014	1. FC Schweinfurt 05	Regionalliga Bayern	16	0			-		-			
Bahrain			League		Bahrain Cup		League Cup		Asia		Total	
2015–16	Manama Club	Bahraini Premier League	7	0				-		-		
Total	Germany											
Total	Cyprus											
Bahrain												
Career total												
