= Gerda Serai District =

Gerda Seray (Pashto: ګېرډا سېرای) is a district of Paktia Province, Afghanistan. It was created in 2005 within Wuza Zadran District. The estimated population in 2021 was 12,684.
