= Pacha Gul Wafadar =

Afghanistan Ambassador to Bulgaria
- President: Mohammed Daoud Khan

Afghanistan Ambassador to Libya
- President: Nur Muhammad Taraki

Afghanistan Ambassador to India
- In office 1978–1983
- President: Nur Muhammad Taraki

Personal details
- Born: Paktia, Afghanistan
- Occupation: Ambassador

Pacha Gul Wafadar (Pashto: پاچا گل وفادار) was born on 6 March 1943 in Paktia, Afghanistan. Educated in Kabul and Russia, he started school at Harbi Shownzi (Army high school) in 1950. After graduation in 1962, he went to Saint Petersburg for higher education in the university of Budyonny Military Academy of the Signal Corps, majoring in signal engineering.
