= Shwak District =

Afghanistan District

Coordinates: 33.452°N 69.37°E

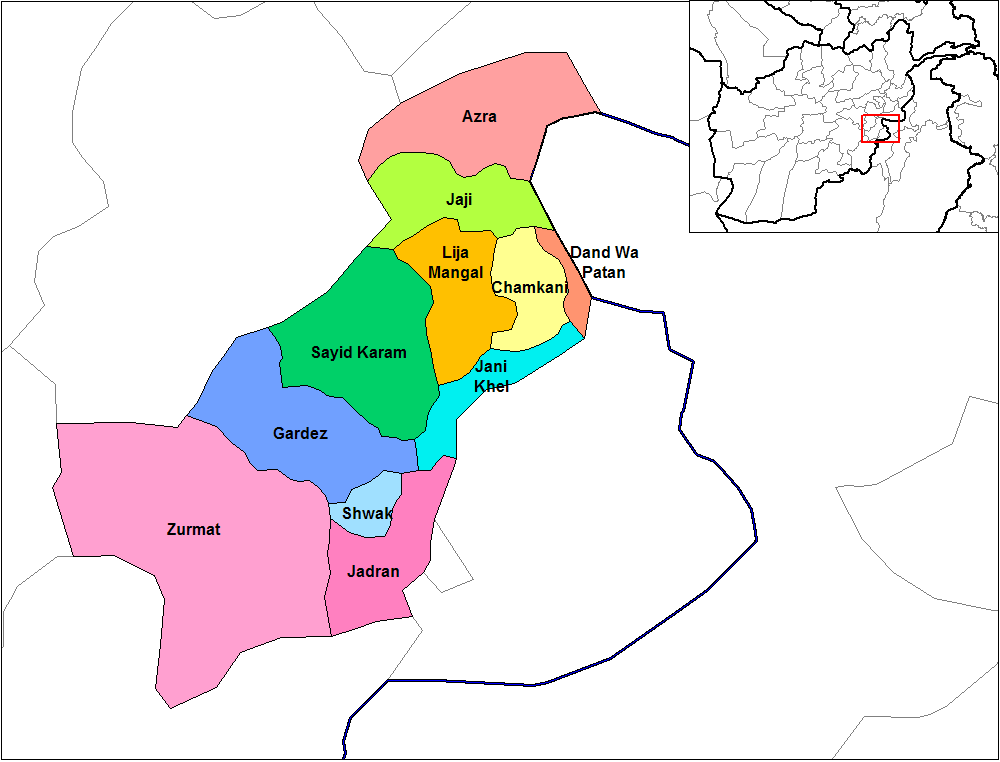
Districts of Paktia province

Shwak District (Pashto: شواک ولسوالۍ) is a district of Paktia Province, Afghanistan. The district is within the heartland of the Zadran tribe of Pashtuns. The estimated population in 2019 was 6,138.
