= Gardez District =

District in Paktia Province, Afghanistan

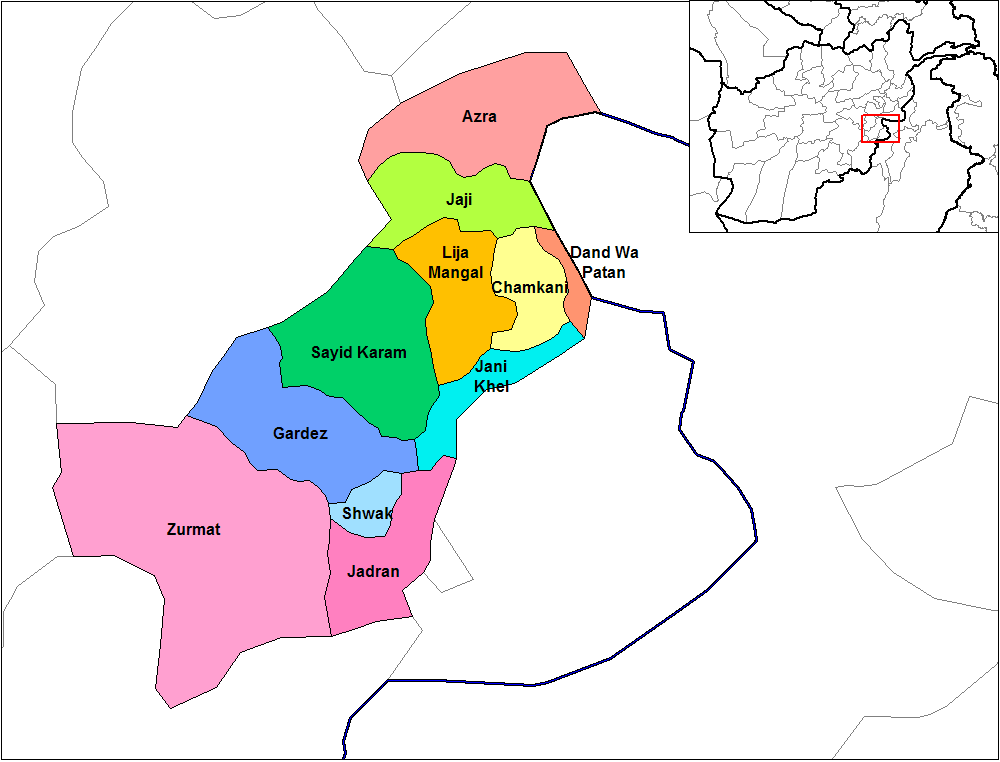
Districts of Paktia Province

Gardez (Pashto: ګردېز ولسوالۍ) is a district in Paktia Province, Afghanistan. The center of the district which is also the capital of Paktia Province is Gardez.

== Demographics & population ==
Like in the rest of Afghanistan, no exact population numbers are available. The Afghan Ministry of Rural Rehabilitation & Development (MRRD) along with UNHCR and Central Statistics Office (CSO) of Afghanistan estimated the population of the district to be around 86,609 (CSO 2004). According to the same sources, Pashtuns make up 70% of the total population followed by 30% Tajiks.

== Notable people ==
- Abu Sa'id Gardezi, 11th-century geographer and historian
- Shah Gardez, 11th-century Sufi saint who established himself in Multan, India (now in Pakistan)
- Mohammad Najibullah, President of Afghanistan from 1987 to 1992
- Khalaf ibn Ahmad, the last Saffarid Emir who died in Gardez in 1009 where he had been sent after the Ghaznavid conquest
- Zabiullah Mujahid, Spokesman of the Taliban
