= Zadran District =

District of Paktia Province, Afghanistan

Coordinates: 33.3833°N 69.5333°E

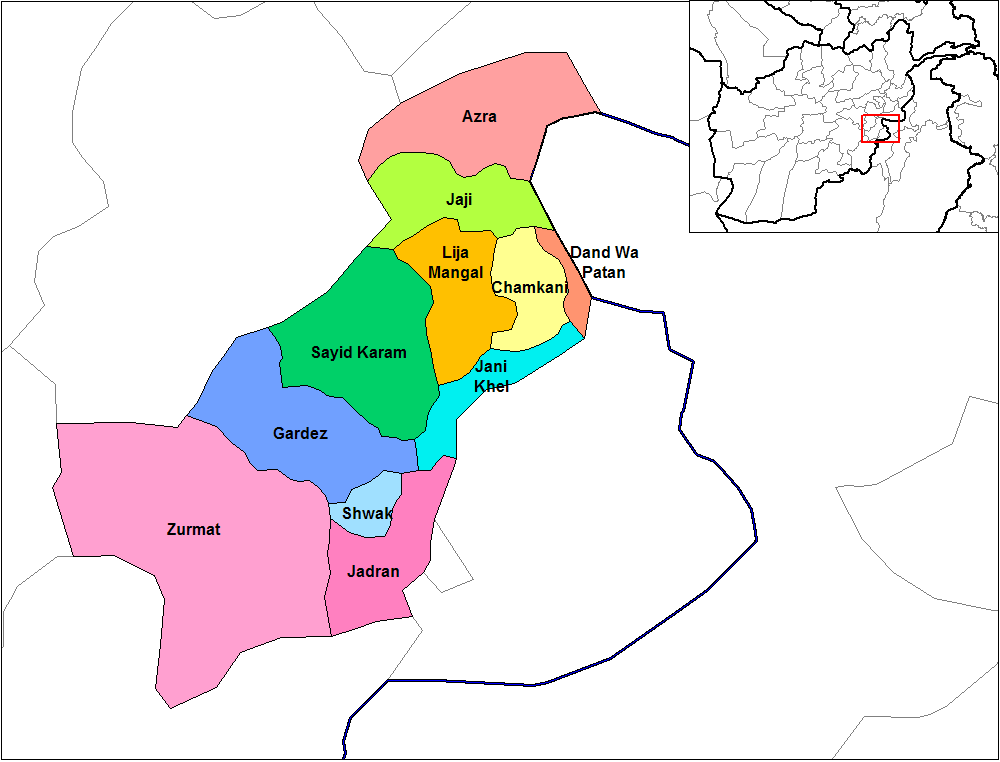
Districts of Paktia province

Zadran District (Pashto: د ځدراڼ ولسوالۍ) is a district of Paktia Province, Afghanistan. The district is within the heartland of the Zadran tribe of Pashtuns. The soccer player Djelaludin Sharityar was born in Zadran. The estimated population is 27,007 (2019).
