= Paktia Province =

Province of Afghanistan

Coordinates: 33.6°N 69.5°E

Paktia پکتیا
- Province
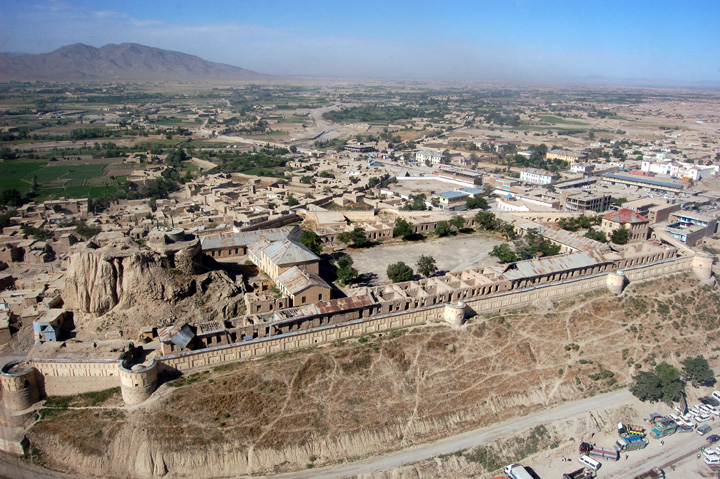
- Aerial view of a fort in Gardez, the capital of Paktia province

- Map of Afghanistan with Paktia highlighted
- Country: Afghanistan
- Capital: Gardez

Government
  - Governor: Mullah Muhrullah Hamad

Area
  - Total: 5,583 km^{2} (2,156 sq mi)

Population (2023)
  - Total: c. 640,000
  - Density: 114.6/km^{2} (297/sq mi)
- Demonym: Paktiawal
- Time zone: UTC+4:30 (Afghanistan Time)
- Postal code: 22xx
- ISO 3166 code: AF-PIA
- Main languages: Pashto

Paktia (Note: Pashto: Pashto pronunciation: [zɑˈbəl]: پکتیا Dari: Dari pronunciation: [zɑː.bʊ́l]: پکتیا) (also spelled Paktiya and Paktya) is one of the southeastern provinces of Afghanistan and is widely regarded as a region of major strategic, cultural, and tribal significance. It borders Khost to the south, Paktika to the east, Logar and Wardak to the west, and Nangarhar to the north, while also sharing a long international border with Pakistan’s Kurram and North Waziristan regions. The provincial capital is Gardez, which serves as the main administrative, economic, and military center of the region called Loya Paktia.

Covering an area of approximately 6,400 square kilometers and having an estimated population of around 640,000 inhabitants as of 2023, Paktia is characterized by a rugged mountainous landscape that forms part of the southeastern extensions of the Hindu Kush range. Deep valleys, high passes, and forested uplands shape the province's geography, while seasonal rivers and limited arable land define rural settlement patterns. Its location along key mountain corridors connecting central Afghanistan with the Pakistan borderlands gives Paktia enduring geopolitical and military relevance.

Historically, Paktia has been a core region of the Pashtun tribal world and has played a central role in the political and military history of Afghanistan. The province is traditionally associated with powerful Pashtun tribal confederations, particularly the Zadran and related tribes, whose social structures have long shaped local governance and security dynamics. Due to its border position, Paktia has frequently been a frontline region during major conflicts, including the Soviet–Afghan War, the civil wars of the 1990s, and the post-2001 conflict.

Today, Paktia is characterized by its strategic border position, strong tribal identity, limited economic development, and persistent security challenges. Much of the population depends on subsistence agriculture, livestock herding, small-scale trade, and cross-border commerce. Despite gradual improvements in infrastructure and services, large rural areas remain affected by difficult terrain, poverty, and restricted connectivity. At the same time, Paktia retains a powerful regional identity rooted in tribal traditions, resistance history, and its role as a gateway between central Afghanistan and the Pashtun belt of Pakistan.

== Etymology ==
The name Paktia is derived from the ancient ethnonym Paktha, which is believed to designate one of the earliest known Pashtun-related tribes mentioned by Herodotus in the 5th century BCE among the peoples of eastern Achaemenid Iran. The Paktha are generally identified with the ancient inhabitants of the southeastern Hindu Kush region, forming part of the broader Indo-Iranian tribal sphere. Linguistically, the name is linked to the Old Iranian root Pakta (Avestan: 𐬞𐬀𐬐𐬙𐬀, romanized: *pakta-), referring to a tribal or ethnic grouping associated with the mountainous frontier zone between Central Asia and the Indian subcontinent. Some historians also associate the name with the wider historical region of Pakhtunkhwa, suggesting a shared etymological and ethnocultural origin tied to the early Pashtun homeland in southeastern Afghanistan and northwestern Pakistan.

== History ==
=== Antiquity ===
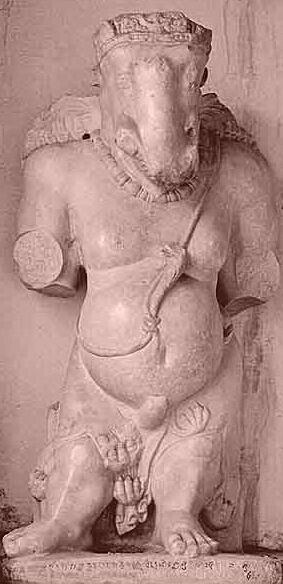
5th century marble of the Hindu god Ganesha found in Gardez

The territory of present-day Paktia has been inhabited since antiquity and formed part of the eastern highland zone connecting the Iranian plateau with the northwestern regions of the Indian subcontinent. In classical sources, the area is associated with the Paktha, a tribal group mentioned by Herodotus in the 5th century BCE, widely regarded as an early ancestor of modern Pashtun populations. During the period of the Achaemenid Empire (c. 550–330 BCE), the region formed part of the empire's eastern frontier and was integrated into military supply routes linking Bactria with the Indus basin.

After the conquests of Alexander the Great in the late 4th century BCE, Paktia lay on the margins of the Seleucid Empire and later came under the influence of successive Hellenistic and South Asian political formations, including the Indo-Greek Kingdom and the Maurya Empire. Under the Kushan Empire (1st–3rd centuries CE), southeastern Afghanistan became part of major transregional trade and cultural networks connecting Central Asia, South Asia, and the Iranian world. While major urban centers developed mainly in surrounding lowland regions, Paktia remained predominantly tribal and rural, with limited urbanization due to its mountainous geography.

=== Medieval period ===
With the expansion of Arab-Islamic power in the 7th and 8th centuries, Islam gradually spread into the mountainous regions of southeastern Afghanistan. The initial presence of the Umayyad Caliphate was followed by more sustained control under the Abbasid Caliphate, though the effective administration of Paktia remained heavily dependent on local tribal authorities. By the 9th and 10th centuries, the province was incorporated into the domains of the Saffarids and subsequently the Ghaznavid Empire. Under the Ghaznavids, especially during the reign of Mahmud of Ghazni, Paktia functioned as a strategically important hinterland supplying manpower for campaigns into India and serving as a corridor linking Ghazni with the eastern Afghan frontier. Control later passed to the Ghurid dynasty in the 12th century.

The Mongol invasions of the 13th century caused widespread devastation in much of Afghanistan, though the rugged terrain of the region limited the permanent establishment of Mongol administration, allowing many tribal structures to survive with relative continuity. During the Timurid Empire period (14th–15th centuries), Paktia remained loosely integrated into imperial systems through indirect rule. Political authority was exercised primarily through tribal leaders, while the region maintained trade connections with Kabul, Ghazni, and the eastern Afghan lowlands.

=== Early modern period ===
From the 16th century onward, Paktia lay on the shifting frontier between the Safavid Empire and the Mughal Empire. While both powers periodically sought influence over southeastern Afghanistan, direct imperial administration in Paktia remained limited. The province functioned primarily as a Pashtun tribal zone whose inhabitants frequently participated in the military struggles between the two empires as auxiliary forces.

The early 18th century marked a major turning point with the rise of Pashtun political authority under the Hotak dynasty. Although the Hotak center of power lay in Kandahar, the political transformation strengthened Pashtun autonomy across southeastern Afghanistan. Following the defeat of the Hotaks by Nader Shah in 1738 and his subsequent death, Ahmad Shah Durrani founded the Durrani Empire in 1747. Paktia became firmly incorporated into the emerging Afghan state and served as a key recruitment base for tribal forces supporting the Durrani rulers.

Throughout the 19th century, Paktia remained one of the strongholds of tribal power during the reigns of Afghan emirs, particularly under the centralization efforts of Abdur Rahman Khan. During the Anglo-Afghan Wars, the province was not permanently occupied by British forces but played an important supporting role in resistance efforts and in maintaining Afghanistan's eastern frontier.

=== During war times (1979–2021) ===
The Soviet invasion of Afghanistan in 1979 transformed Paktia into one of the main battlegrounds of the Soviet–Afghan War. Due to its direct access to the Pakistan border, particularly through routes leading to the Kurram District and North Waziristan, the province became a crucial logistics corridor for mujahideen groups. Among the most influential commanders operating from Paktia was Jalaluddin Haqqani, whose network played a central role in coordinating resistance in eastern Afghanistan. Throughout the 1980s, the province was subjected to repeated bombardment, ground offensives, and forced displacement of civilian populations. In 1985, Khost and Paktika separated from Paktia and became distinct provinces.

After the Soviet withdrawal from Afghanistan in 1989, power fragmented among rival mujahideen factions. During the Afghan civil war, control over Paktia shifted between competing commanders aligned either with the government in Kabul or with regional power centers. By the late 1990s, the Taliban had extended their control over most of eastern Afghanistan, including Paktia. The province was administered under the Islamic Emirate of Afghanistan, with strict enforcement of their interpretation of Sharia law.

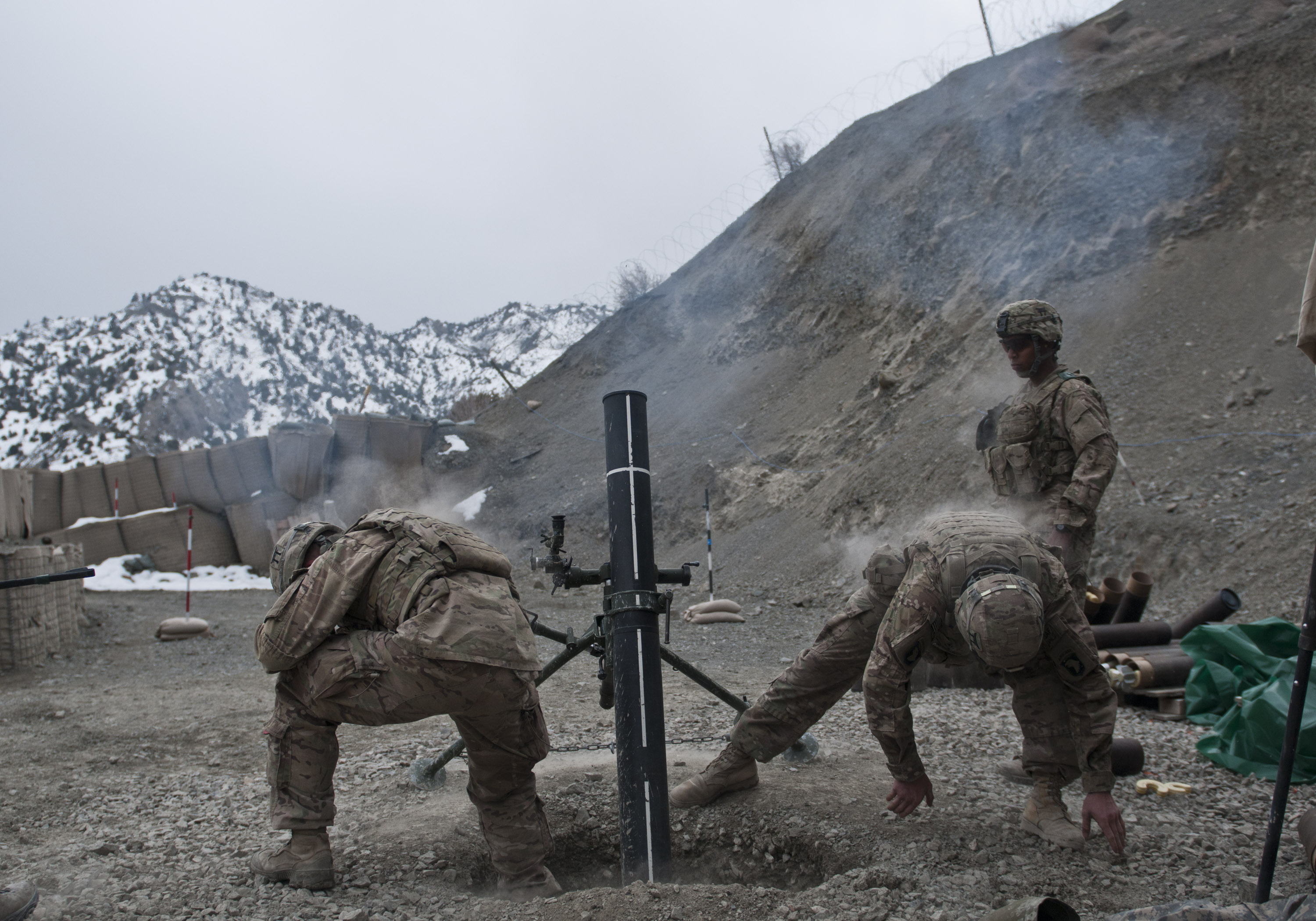
U.S. military personnel during a fire mission (2013)

Following the United States invasion of Afghanistan in late 2001, Taliban forces were expelled from the province with the support of local militias and U.S. airpower. Paktia subsequently became a persistent center of insurgent activity throughout the war in Afghanistan, with frequent attacks on Afghan government installations and international forces. Despite years of international military presence and development programs, the province remained affected by insecurity, underdevelopment, and cross-border militancy throughout the 2000s and 2010s.

=== Today (2021–) ===
During the nationwide collapse of the Afghan government in the summer of 2021, Taliban forces rapidly seized control of Paktia as part of the 2021 Taliban offensive. The provincial capital Gardez fell without prolonged resistance, and the province returned to Taliban rule under the re-established Islamic Emirate of Afghanistan. Since 2021, the Taliban have governed Paktia through appointed provincial officials and security structures. New social and political restrictions have been introduced, particularly affecting women's education, employment, and public participation. Economic contraction, limited humanitarian access, and reduced cross-border formal trade have further strained local livelihoods, though large-scale armed conflict has subsided.

== Geography ==
=== Landscape ===
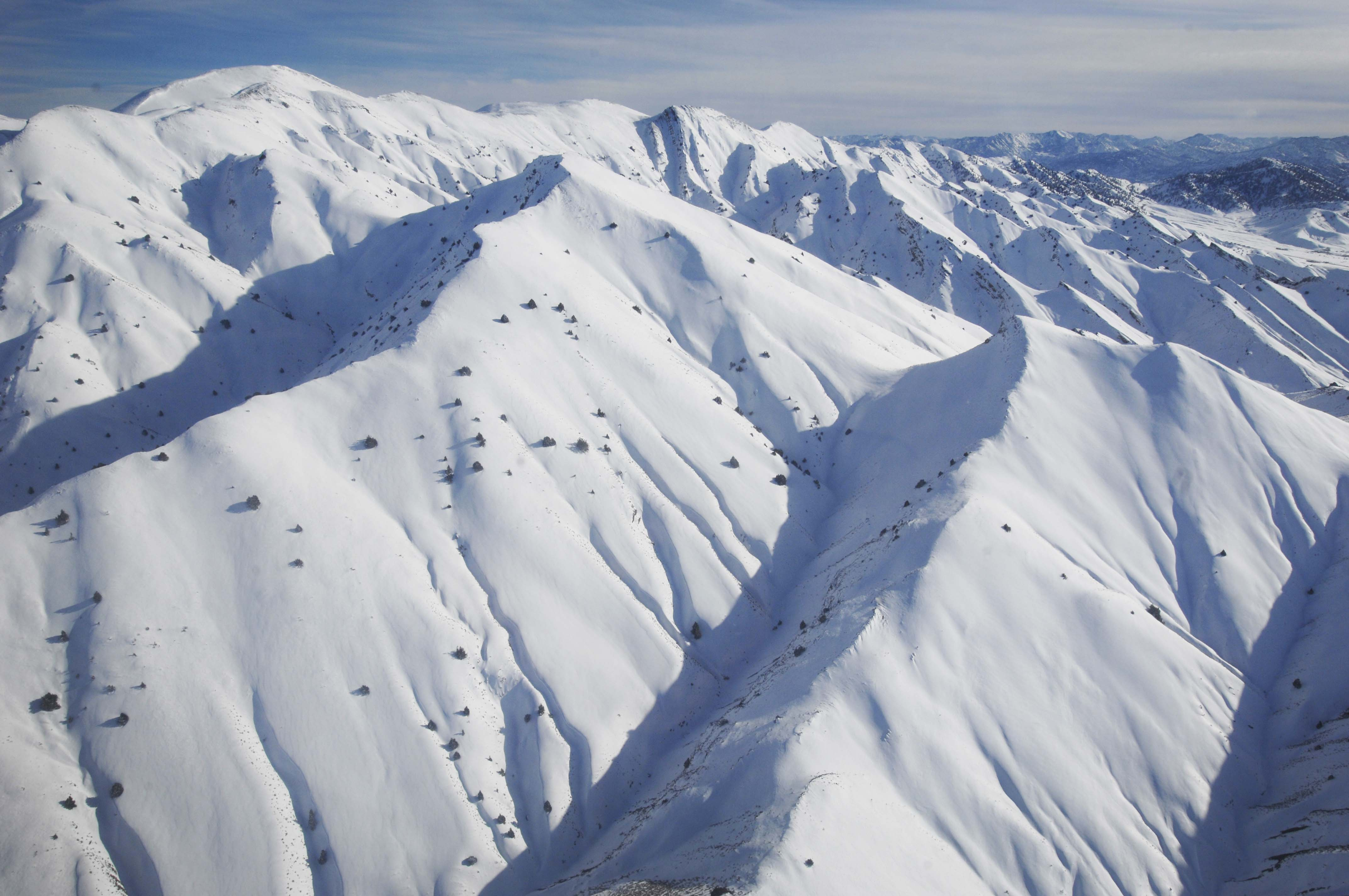
Snow-covered mountains in Paktia province

Paktia is situated in southeastern Afghanistan and shares borders with Khost to the south, Paktika to the east, Logar and Ghazni to the west, and Nangarhar to the north. The province is dominated by rugged mountain terrain forming part of the southeastern extensions of the Hindu Kush mountain system. The Khost-Gardez mountain pass links Paktia with Khost to the south. Deep valleys, narrow passes, and elevated plateaus characterize much of the landscape, creating natural barriers between districts and shaping settlement patterns.

Unlike the lowland agricultural regions of southern Afghanistan, Paktia's terrain is largely composed of steep hills, forested uplands, and rocky ridges. Arable land is mostly confined to valley floors and basin areas around the provincial capital Gardez, as well as in smaller intermontane plains. Seasonal rivers and mountain streams provide limited irrigation, supporting subsistence farming and livestock grazing. The mountainous terrain has historically contributed to the relative isolation of Paktia and its long tradition of tribal autonomy.

=== Flora and fauna ===
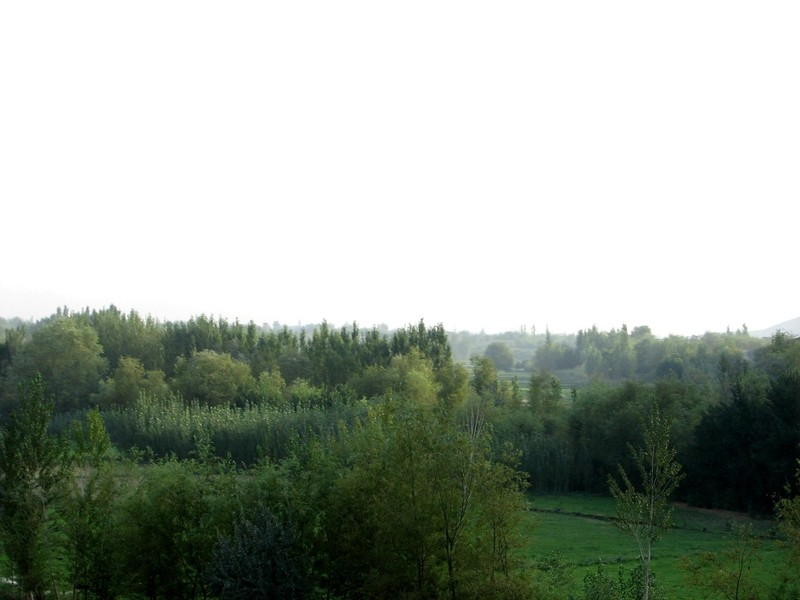
A forest in Paktia

The flora of Paktia reflects its transitional position between the dry lowlands of eastern Afghanistan and the cooler highland zones of the central mountains. Higher elevations support scattered conifer forests, particularly of juniper and pine, while lower slopes are covered with shrubs, wild grasses, and drought-resistant vegetation. Cultivated areas in valley bottoms produce crops such as wheat, maize, barley, and various vegetables, alongside small orchards of apples, apricots, and walnut trees.

Wildlife in the province includes species adapted to mountainous environments. Common mammals include wolves, foxes, jackals, wild goats, and porcupines, while higher elevations may still host limited populations of ibex and snow leopard. Birdlife includes eagles, hawks, partridges, and migratory species that pass through river valleys during seasonal movements. Due to habitat loss, overgrazing, and hunting, several native species have experienced population decline in recent decades.

=== Climate ===
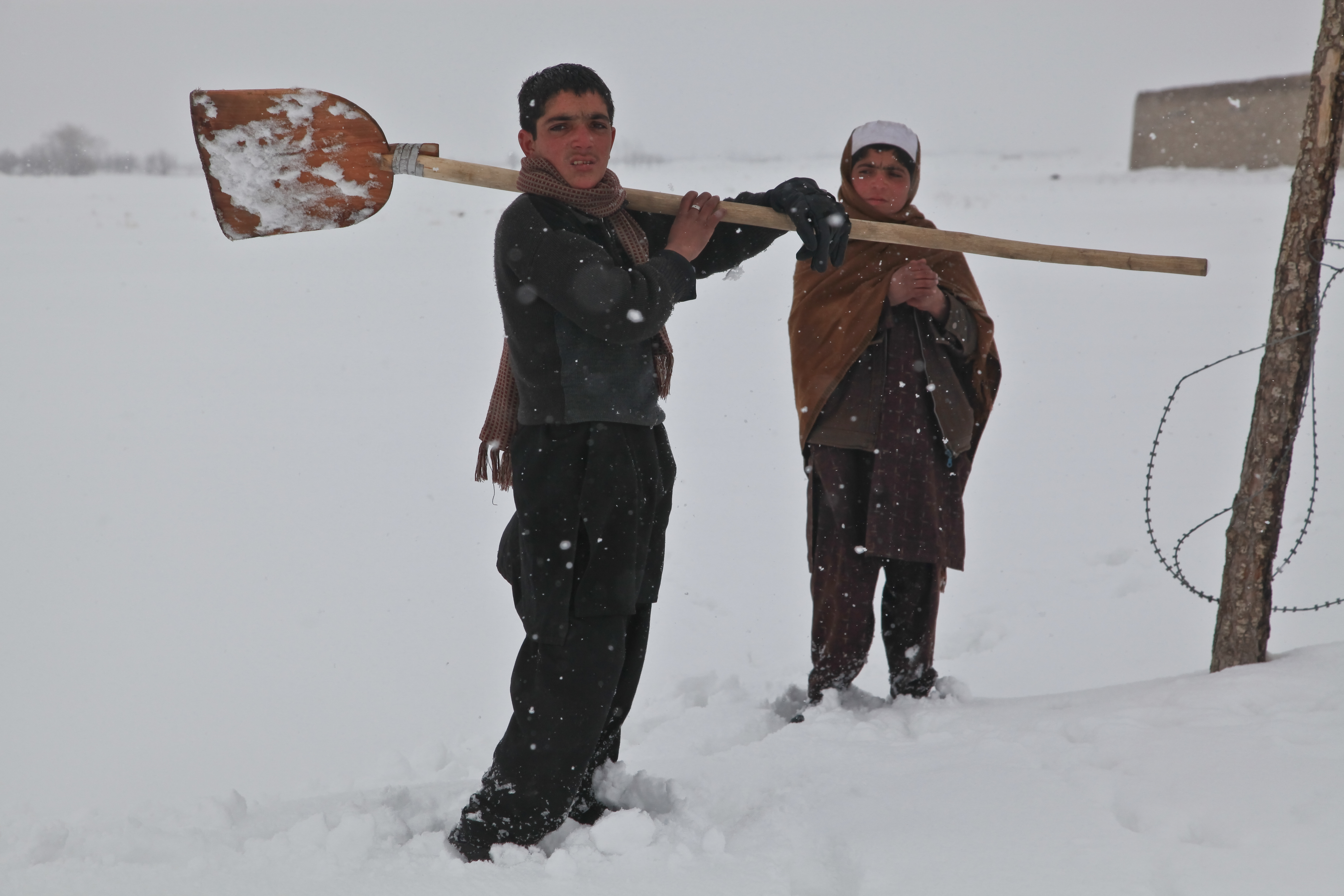
Paktia often experiences heavy snowfall during winters

Paktia experiences a predominantly continental climate influenced by altitude, with cold winters and mild to warm summers. Winter temperatures in higher elevations frequently fall below freezing, with regular snowfall in mountainous areas, while summers are comparatively moderate compared with Afghanistan's lowland regions. Average summer temperatures generally range between 20 °C and 30 °C, though lower valleys can experience higher heat.

Precipitation is higher than in much of southern Afghanistan and occurs mainly during late winter and spring, contributing to seasonal river flow and groundwater recharge. Snowmelt from surrounding mountains plays a critical role in water availability for agriculture. The province is occasionally affected by strong winds and localized storms, which can disrupt transportation through mountain passes. Overall, the cooler climate and higher precipitation distinguish Paktia environmentally from the arid provinces of southern Afghanistan.

== Government and politics ==
=== Local governance ===
Paktia's governance has historically been shaped by the strong presence of tribal structures, local councils, and periodic central oversight. In the 19th and early 20th centuries, the province was administered through a combination of tribal leaders, appointed provincial officials from Kabul, and influential maliks who exercised authority over local communities. These traditional leaders mediated disputes, organized local defense, and coordinated tax collection while recognizing the sovereignty of the Afghan state.

During the conflicts from 1979 onwards—including the Soviet–Afghan War, subsequent civil wars, and the first Taliban regime—formal governance structures were often supplanted by armed factions and tribal militias. After the 2001 intervention, the provincial administration was re-established through appointed officials, although tribal councils and religious leaders continued to influence decision-making and local dispute resolution.

Since the Taliban return to power in 2021, Paktia has been governed under the Islamic Emirate of Afghanistan, with provincial and district officials appointed centrally. Tribal networks, religious figures, and local shuras remain significant in mediating conflicts and guiding community decisions.

As of December 2025, the governor of Paktia is Mullah Muhrullah Hamad.

=== Administrative divisions ===
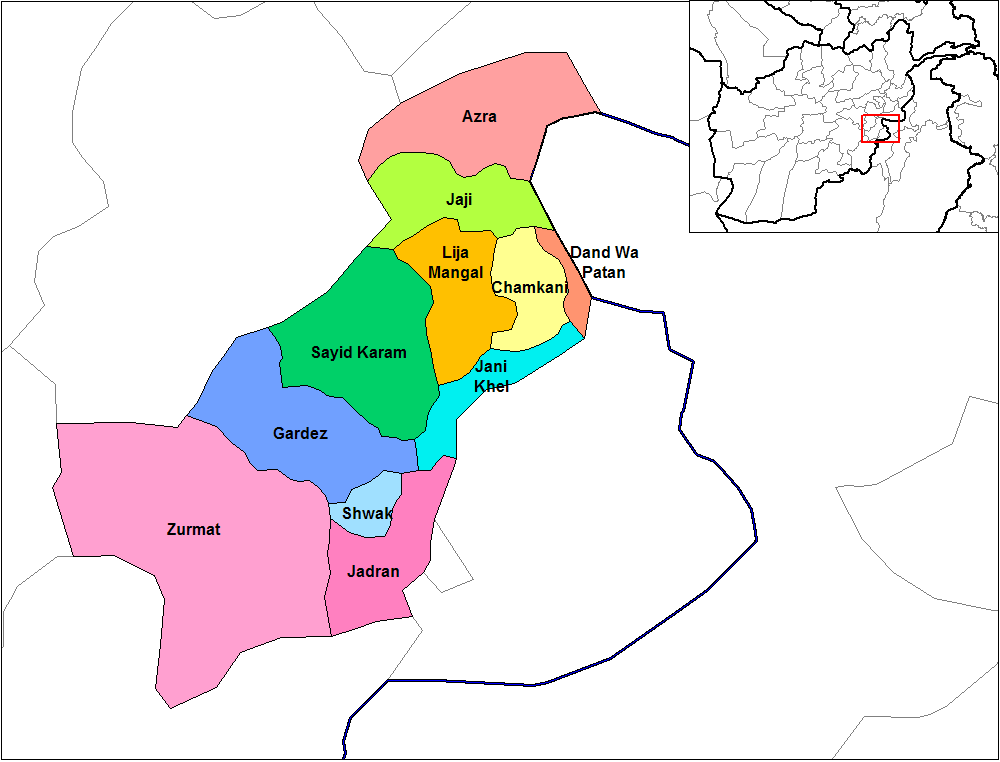
Map of the districts of Paktia as of January 2004, prior to the redrawing of provincial and district boundaries later that year

Paktia is divided into 13 official and two unofficial districts, each administered by a district chief responsible for governance, coordination with the provincial government, and basic public services. The provincial capital, Gardez, serves as the main administrative, economic, and cultural hub, while other important districts include Lazha Mangal, Said Karam, and Zazi. District centers are typically located along valley floors, near water sources, or on accessible mountain routes. Local administrations manage civil registration, dispute resolution, and oversight of education, health services, and infrastructure maintenance.

Districts of Paktia Province
District	Population (2022)	Area	Pop. density	Ethnicity	Notes
Ahmad Aba	31,488	364	86	Pashtuns	Created in 2005 within Said Karam District; includes the unofficial district Mirzaka
Ahmadkhel	25,775	220	117	Pashtuns	
Dand Aw Patan	30,027	219	137	Pashtuns	
Gardez	95,663	679	141	60% Pashtun and 40% Tajik	Includes the capital Gardez, which lies at the crossroads of the province's main north–south and east–west roads
Gerda Serai	12,642	293	43	Pashtuns	
Janikhel	39,459	353	112	Pashtuns	
Lazha Mangal	21,258	193	110	Pashtuns	
Mirzaka	9,698	220	44	Pashtuns	
Rohani Baba	23,018	653	35	Pashtuns	
Said Karam	62,975	256	246	95% Pashtuns and 5% Tajiks	Sub-divided in 2005
Shwak	6,245	114	55	Pashtuns	
Chamkani	56,465	301	188	Pashtuns	Includes the town of Chamkani (called Share Now), the largest in the eastern half of Paktia and a major gateway to Pakistan
Zadran	27,480	263	104	Pashtuns	Inofficially sub-divided in 2005 to create Gerda Serai
Zazi (Jaji)	71,212	591	120	100% Pashtuns	People fleeing sectarian strife between Shiites and Sunnis in Pakistan occasionally take refuge in Zazi
Zurmat	98,547	747	132	97% Pashtuns and 3% Tajiks	Populous, relatively prosperous agricultural district. Unlike most other districts, Zurmat includes more than one tribal group, making it somewhat more fractious than other districts
Paktia	611,952	5,583	110	93.3% Pashtuns, 6.7% Tajiks. (Note: Note: "Predominantely" or "dominated" is interpreted as 99%, "majority" as 70%, "mixed" as 1/(number of ethnicities), "minority" as 30% and "few" or "some" as 1%.)	

=== Security ===
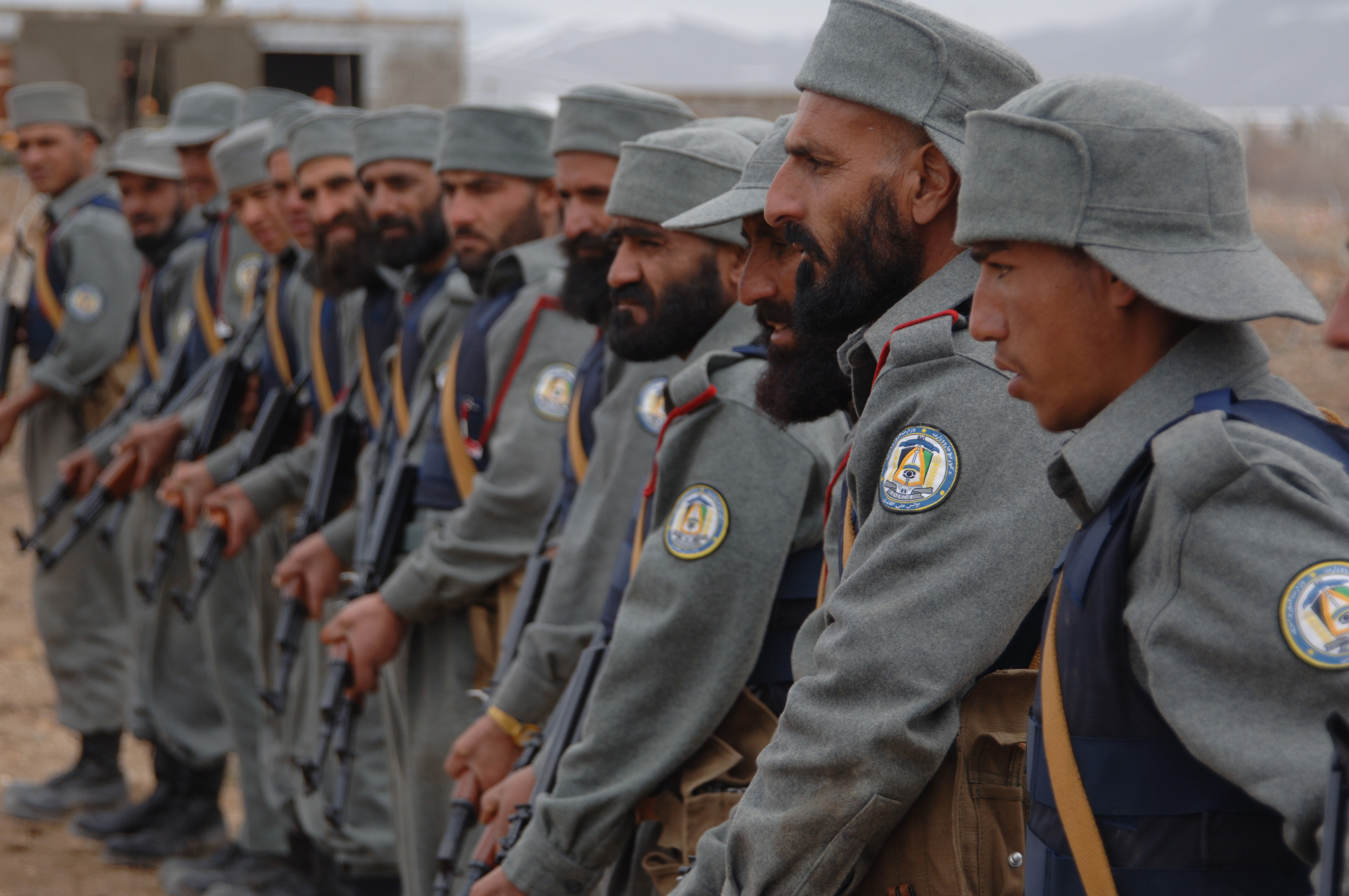
Afghan National Police recruits (2007)

Paktia's security situation is shaped by its mountainous terrain, tribal networks, and proximity to the Pakistan border. During the Islamic Republic of Afghanistan period, the province was a focal point for counterinsurgency operations against Taliban and other militant groups. Since 2021, the Taliban maintain primary control over the province, establishing administrative and security mechanisms in both urban and rural areas. While major population centers such as Gardez are relatively stable, remote districts remain prone to localized insurgent activity, cross-border smuggling, and tribal disputes. Traditional structures, including shuras and maliks, continue to influence security arrangements and dispute mediation throughout the province.

== Economy ==
The economy of Paktia is primarily based on agriculture, livestock farming, and cross-border trade with Pakistan. Subsistence farming and small-scale commerce remain the backbone of local livelihoods, while public employment and aid-dependent income have fluctuated due to political instability. Remittances from family members working elsewhere also contribute significantly to household incomes.

=== Agriculture and animal husbandry ===
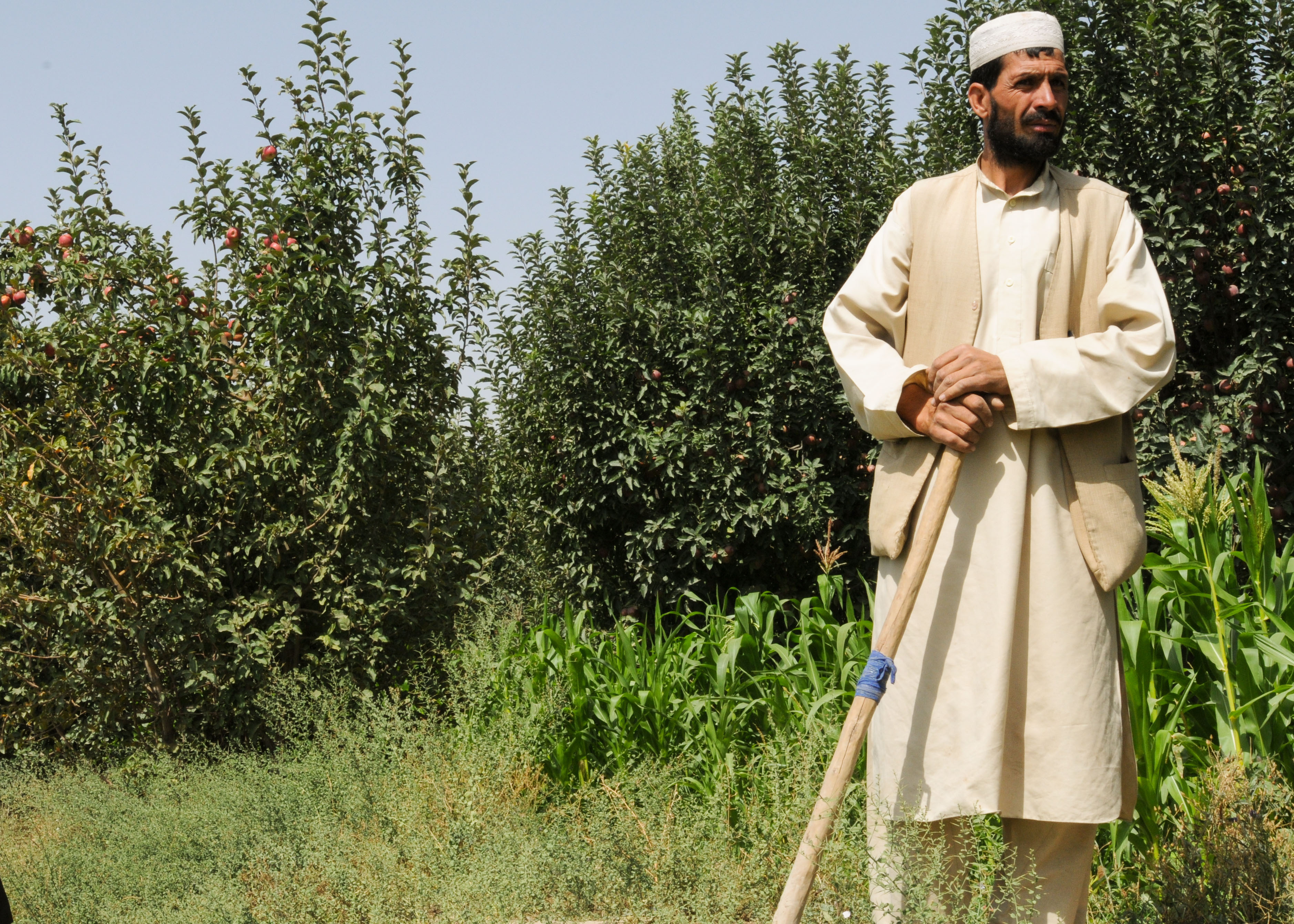
A local farmer stands in front of a plot of apple trees

Agriculture is central to Paktia's economy. Fertile valleys and irrigated plots support the cultivation of wheat, barley, vegetables, and fruits such as apples and grapes. Farmers also grow high-value crops like pomegranates and nuts in suitable areas. Livestock farming is widespread, with sheep, goats, cattle, and poultry providing meat, dairy products, wool, and hides for both domestic use and local trade. Seasonal fluctuations and limited irrigation infrastructure constrain agricultural productivity in some districts.

=== Mining and industry ===
Industrial activity in Paktia is limited and mostly artisanal. Small-scale operations include stone quarrying, brick-making, and traditional handicrafts. Mining focuses on construction materials such as gravel, sand, and stone, which are used locally. The lack of large-scale industry is largely due to limited infrastructure, rugged terrain, and restricted access to investment and energy.

=== Trade ===
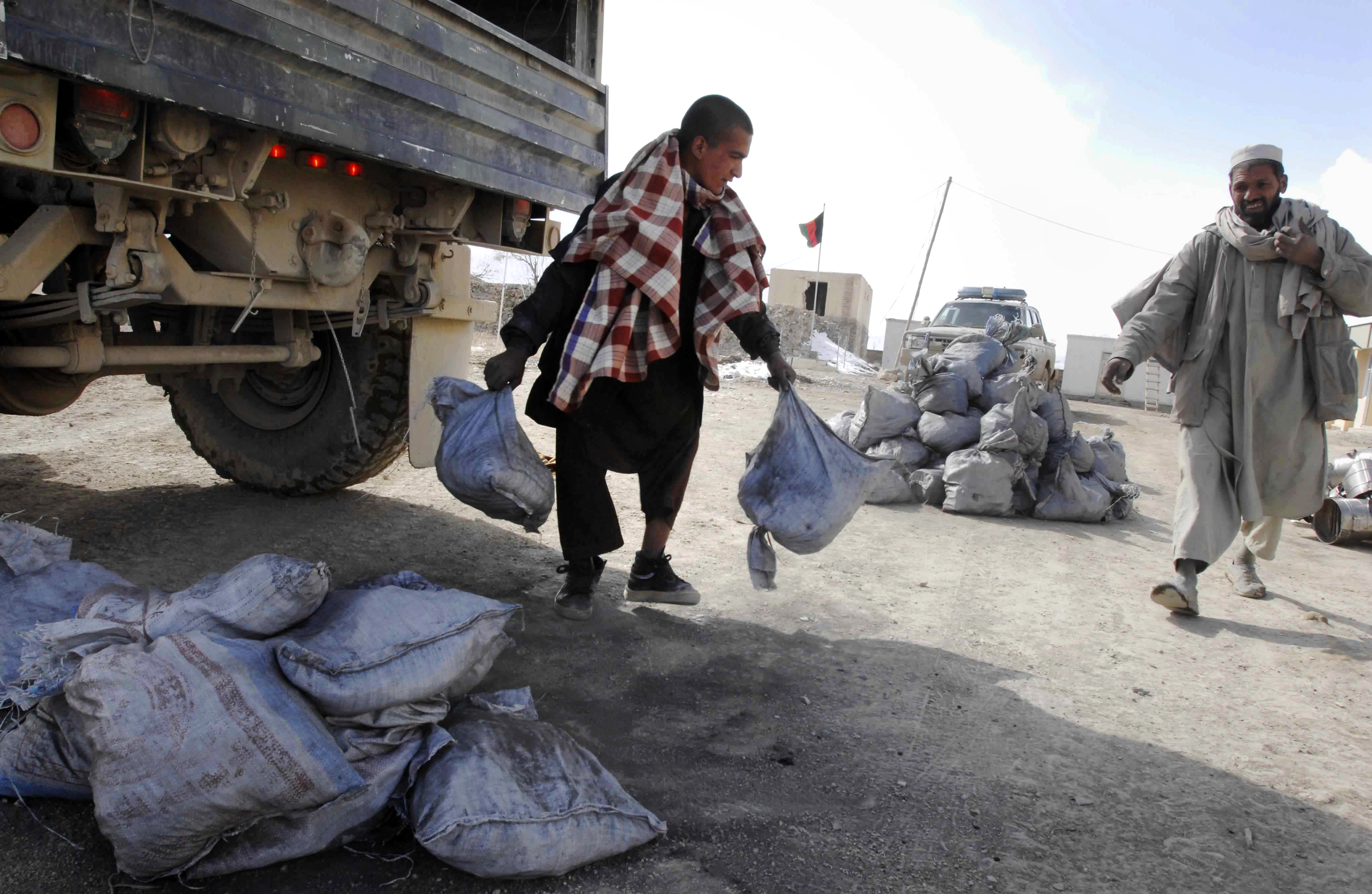
Two local men unload coal used for heating

Paktia's economy benefits from its location along border trade routes with Pakistan. Informal and formal cross-border commerce involves food, construction materials, textiles, and consumer goods. Local markets in Gardez and other towns serve as trade centers for surrounding districts. Trade is often seasonal and affected by security conditions and infrastructure constraints.

=== Energy and irrigation ===
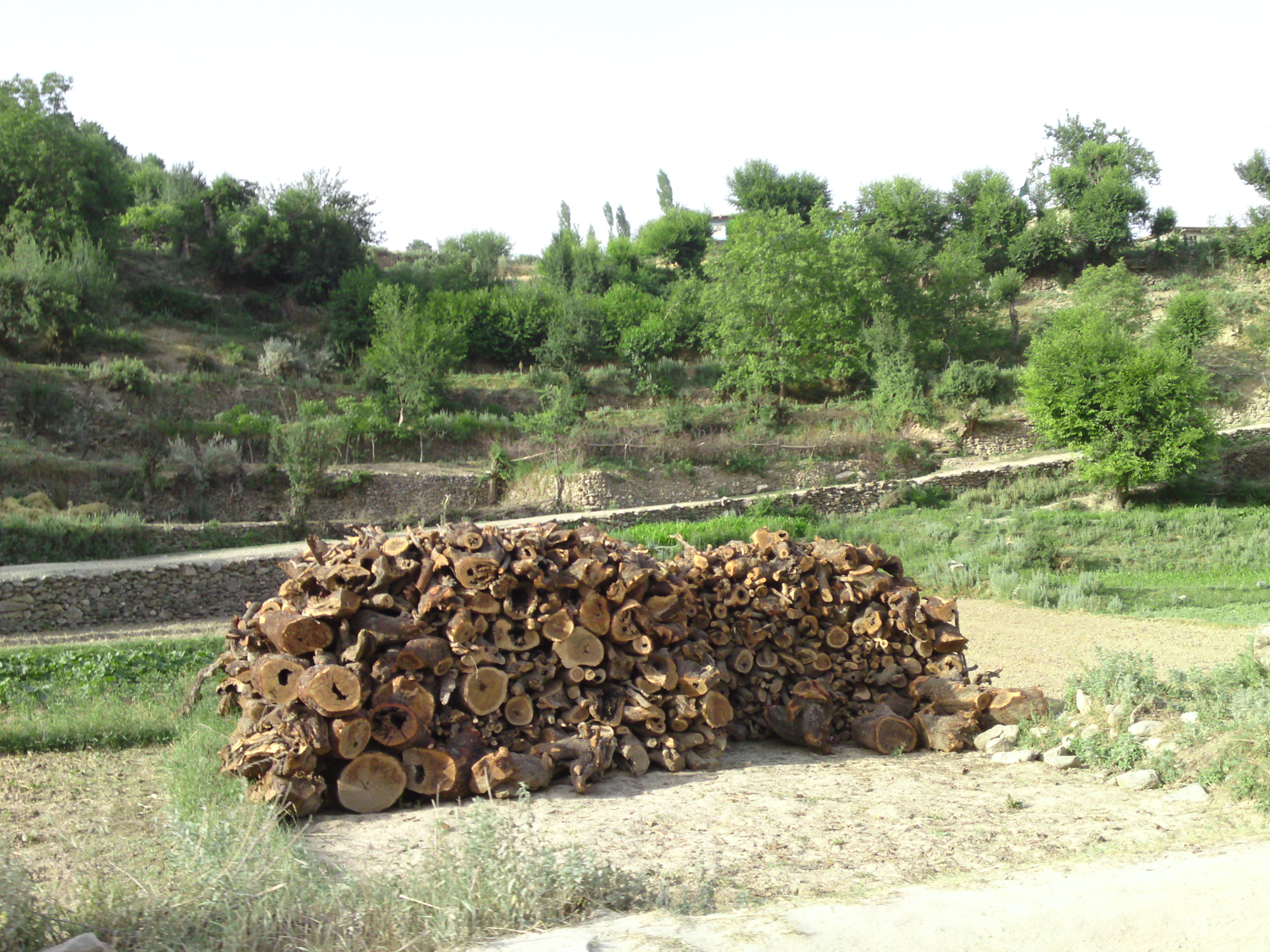
Burning wood is commonly used to supply energy and warmth

Energy supply in Paktia is limited, relying on woodburning, small-scale diesel generators, solar installations, and sporadic grid connections. Irrigation is essential for agriculture, supported by traditional karez systems and small canals drawing water from rivers and mountain streams. Maintenance challenges, drought cycles, and limited technical support affect crop yields and water availability.

=== Tourism ===
Security concerns and underdeveloped infrastructure limit large-scale tourism in Paktia, though local and domestic visitors occasionally travel to prominent religious, cultural, and recreational sites.

=== Communication ===
Telecommunications have expanded gradually, with mobile networks and limited internet access available in urban areas. Rural districts still face connectivity issues due to difficult terrain, electricity shortages, and economic constraints. Internet penetration remains low.

=== Transportation and infrastructure ===
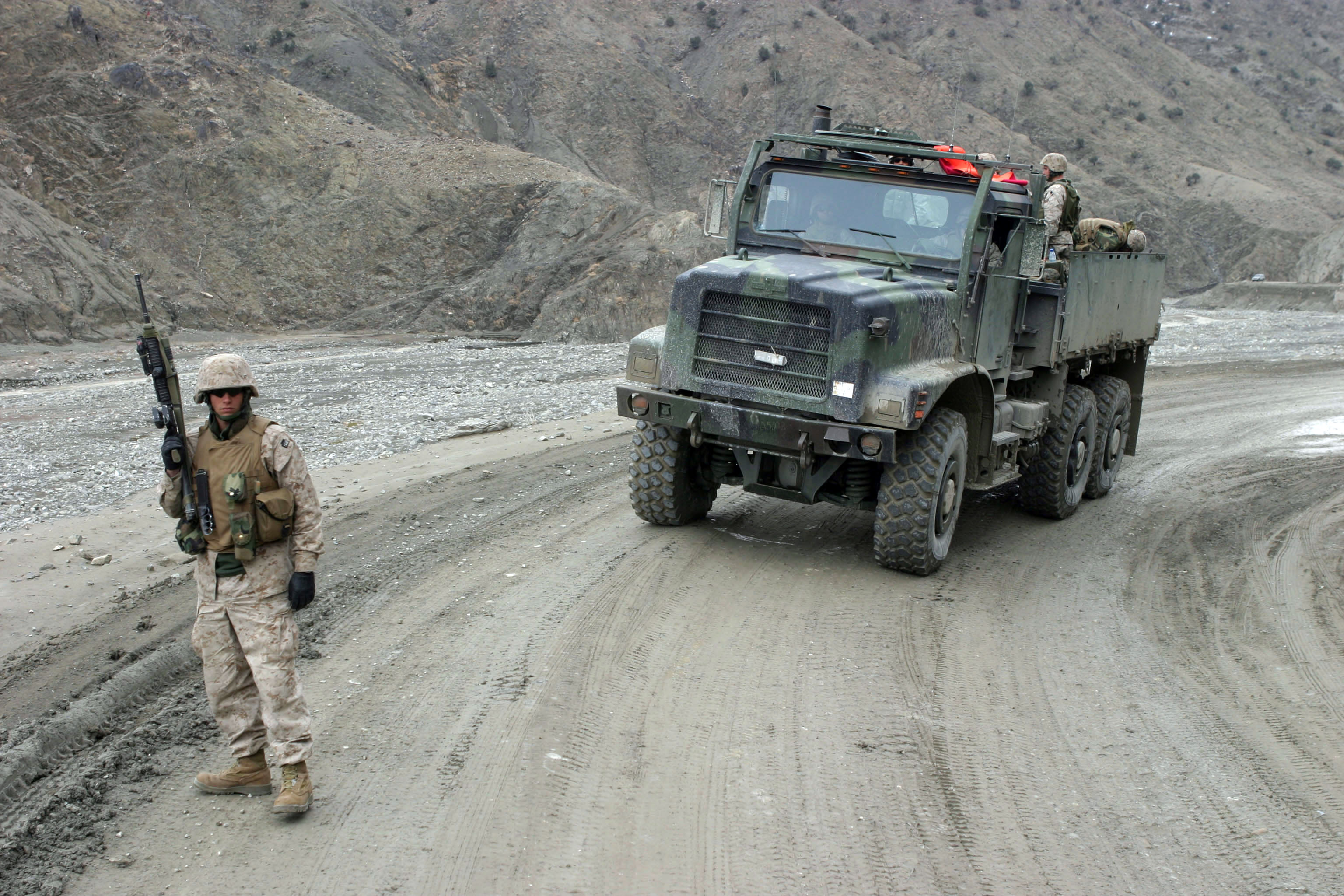
U.S. military cars driving on the Khost-Gardez Pass

Paktia is connected to surrounding provinces and Pakistan by a network of highways and mountain roads. Roads vary in quality, with some paved arterial routes linking Gardez to major towns, while secondary and rural roads are often unpaved or in poor condition. The province lacks operational railway infrastructure. Ground transport relies on trucks, buses, cars, and motorcycles, supporting both local commerce and cross-border trade. Maintenance and development of transportation infrastructure remain key challenges for economic growth.

== Demographics ==
=== Population ===
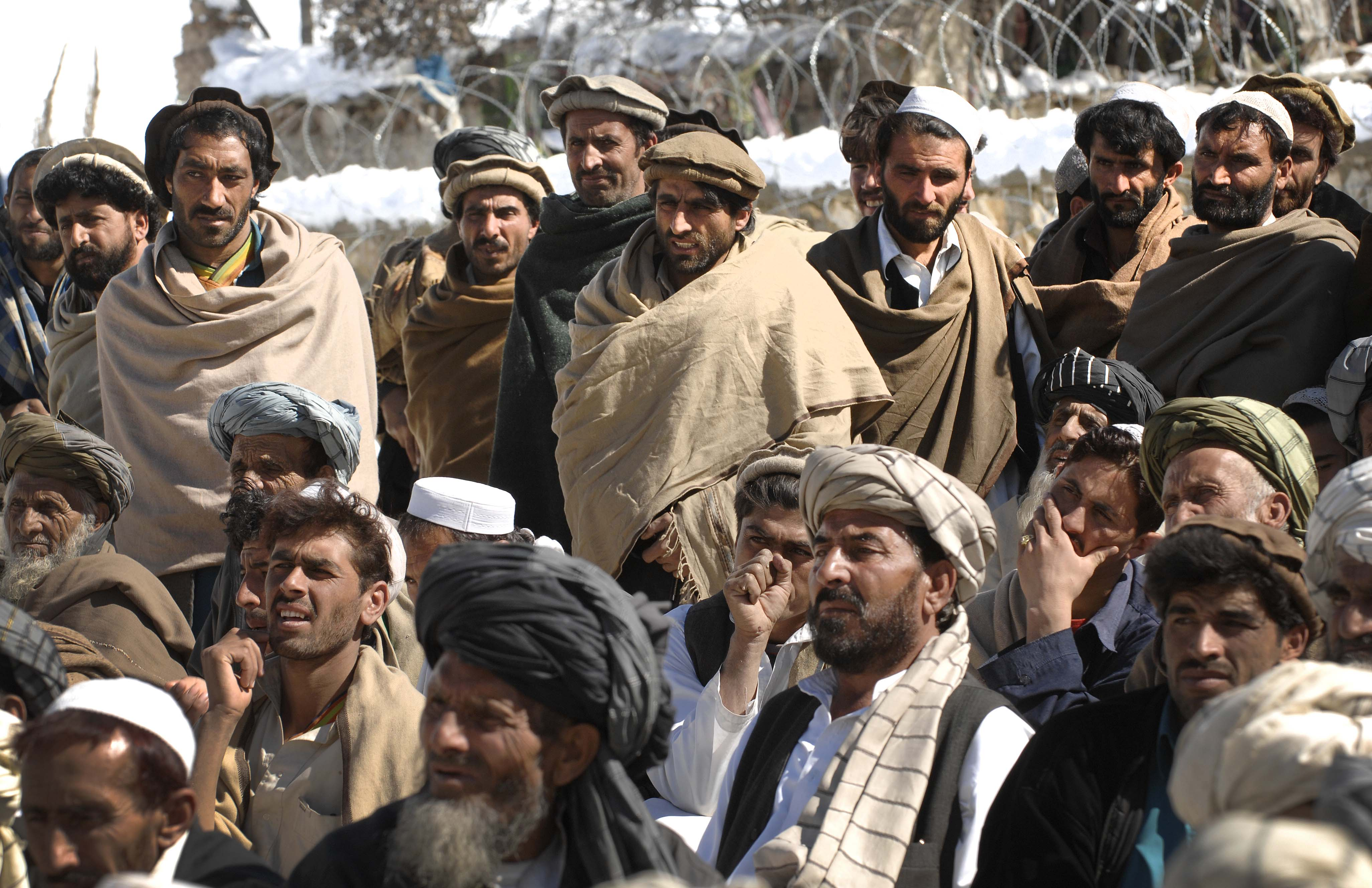
Local men from Paktia

Paktia province has an estimated population of approximately 650,000 people as of 2023, distributed across the provincial capital Gardez, several small district centers, and a large number of mountain and valley villages. The majority of residents live in rural environments and depend on subsistence-based livelihoods. Poverty, limited infrastructure, and weak access to public services continue to significantly affect living conditions, especially in remote districts, with a multidimensional poverty index of 0.261 and 19.0% of the population living in severe poverty as of 2023.. Many households rely on agriculture, cross-border trade, informal labor, and remittances from relatives working outside the province or abroad.

=== Ethnicity, languages, and religion ===
Paktia is ethnically and linguistically one of the most homogeneous provinces of Afghanistan. The population is overwhelmingly Pashtun, with the dominant tribal confederations belonging mainly to the Zadran, Mangal, Ahmadzai, and Tanai tribes. Tribal identity continues to play a central role in social organization, dispute resolution, and political influence.

Pashto is the dominant and nearly universal language of daily life, administration, and education. Dari is spoken by a small minority, largely in the district center of Gardez, mainly for official purposes or trade. The population is almost entirely Sunni Muslim, with religious life centered on local mosques, madrasas, and community religious leaders. Sectarian minorities are extremely limited, and non-Muslim communities are practically absent in the province.

Estimated ethnolinguistic and -religious composition
Ethnicity	Pashtun	Tajik/ Farsiwan	Others	Sources
Period	Pashtun	Tajik/ Farsiwan	Others	Sources

2004–2021 (Islamic Republic)	>90 – 97%	3 – 9%	<1%
2020 EU	1st	2nd	–
2018 UN	majority	significant minority	–
2015 CSSF (Note: Demographic information is based on data from 2015.)	>90%	9%	∅ (Note: incl. Hazara.)
2015 NPS	91%	9%	–
2011 PRT	97% (Note: excl. Kochi.)	3% (Note: 21,000 individuals out of 490,900 individuals.)	<1% (Note: 1,000 individuals out of 490,900 individuals.)
2011 USA	91%	9%	–
2009 ISW	predominant	small population	–

Legend:
- ∅: Ethnicity mentioned in source but not quantified
- –: Ethnicity not mentioned specifically
- Source abbreviations: Empirical sources: –, Government sources: EU – European Union Agency for Asylum, PRT – Provincial Reconstruction Team of the United States government, UN – United Nations Assistance Mission in Afghanistan, Editorial sources: CSSF – Center for the Scientific Study of Families, ISW – Institute for the Study of War, NPS – Naval Postgraduate School, USA – United States Army

=== Education ===
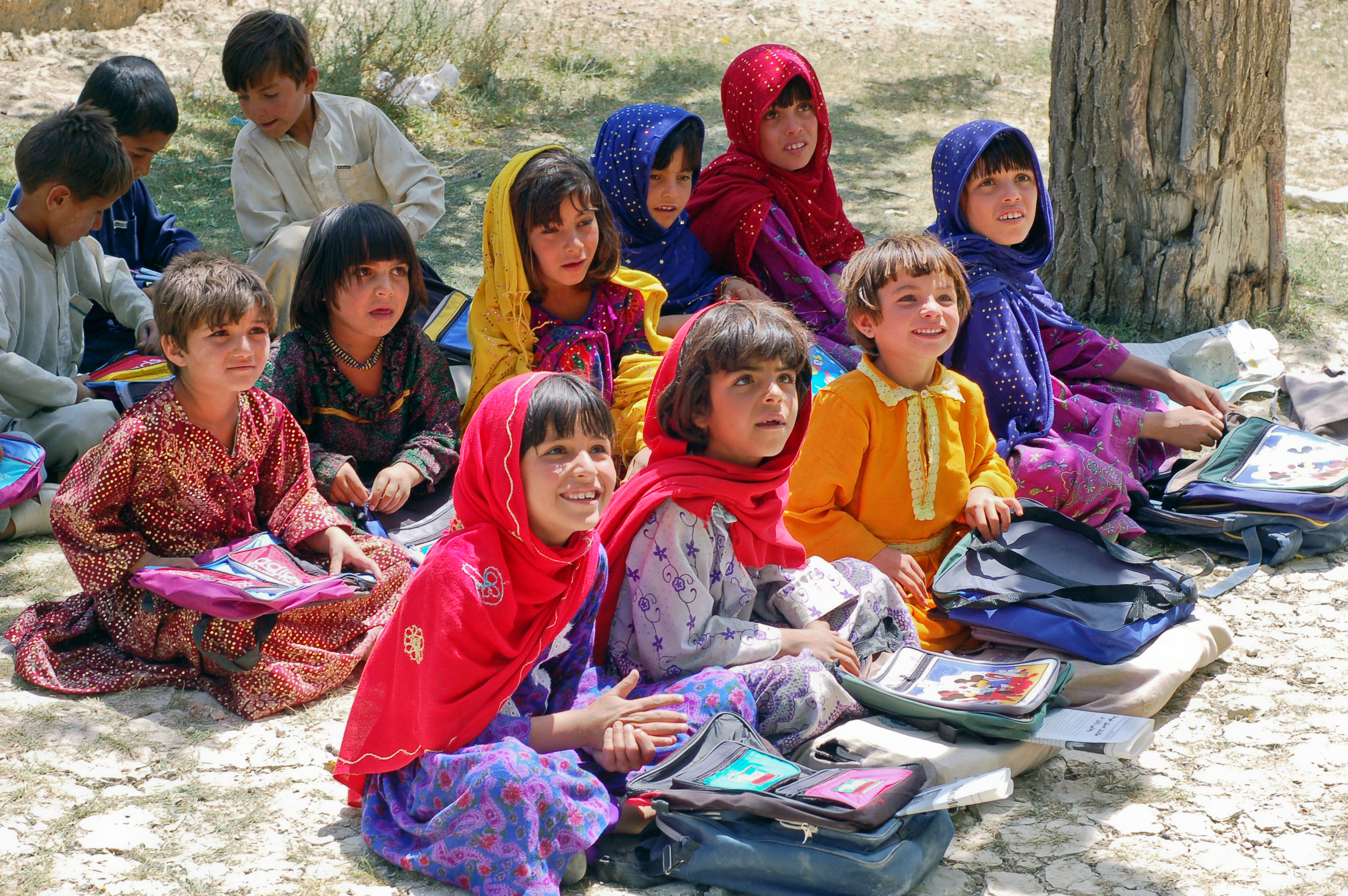
Schoolgirls in the district of Gardez, Paktia

Educational access in Paktia has historically been constrained by geography, insecurity, and poverty. The province has a network of primary and secondary schools concentrated mainly in Gardez and district centers, while many rural villages still face shortages of school buildings, qualified teachers, and learning materials. Paktia University in Gardez serves as the main institution of higher education and offers programs in education, agriculture, Islamic studies, and social sciences.

Overall literacy rates remain low, particularly among women, with the most recent estimates from 2011 indicating an overall literacy rate of 27% and an overall net enrolment rate for school-age children of approximately 24%. Since 2021, the education system has undergone major structural changes under Taliban administration. While boys schooling continues at most levels, access to secondary and higher education for girls is largely restricted. Madrasas have expanded across the province, becoming a significant alternative form of education, especially in rural areas.

=== Health ===
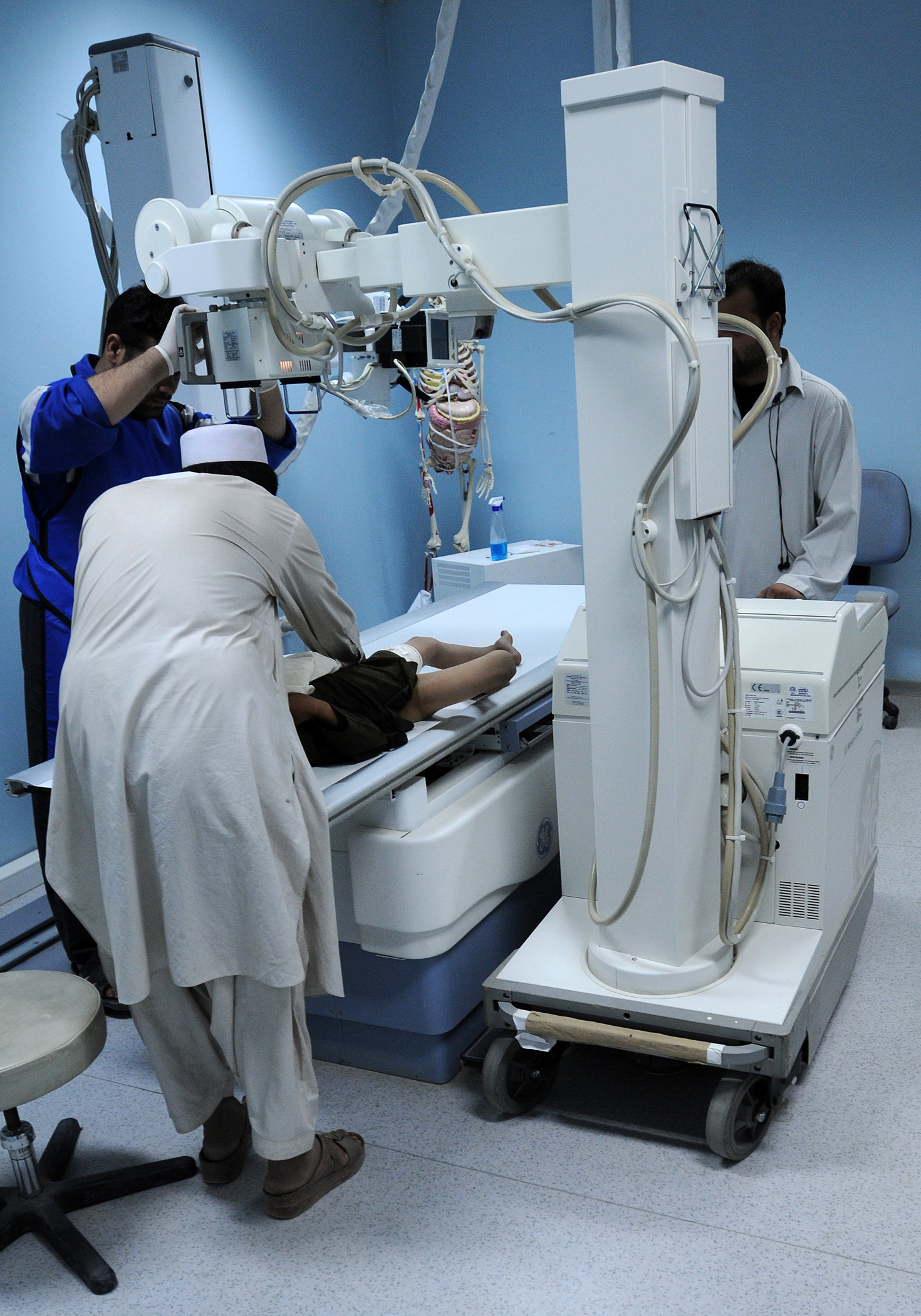
An injured boy receives medical care at the Paktia Regional Medical Hospital

Healthcare services in Paktia are centered primarily in Gardez, where the main provincial hospital and several smaller clinics provide basic and emergency care. Outside the provincial capital, access to healthcare is limited, with many districts reliant on small health posts or mobile medical teams. Travel distance, poor roads, and economic hardship often delay or prevent treatment.

Common health challenges include maternal and infant mortality, malnutrition, respiratory diseases, and limited access to clean drinking water, with the most recent available estimates from 2011 indicating that 36% of households had access to clean drinking water and 3% of births were attended by a skilled birth attendant.. NGOs and humanitarian agencies play a crucial role in providing vaccinations, maternal care, and basic health services, particularly in underserved rural areas. Despite gradual improvements over the past two decades, Paktia's health system remains fragile and heavily dependent on external support.

== Culture ==
=== Music and dances ===
Traditional music and dance in Paktia are deeply rooted in eastern Pashtun tribal culture. The attan is the most important communal dance and is performed at weddings, tribal gatherings, and religious festivities. Compared to southern styles, the Paktia attan is often faster in rhythm and accompanied by strong drum patterns. Music is traditionally played using instruments such as the dhol, rubab, and sometimes the sitar. Folk songs often focus on themes of bravery, mountain life, clan loyalty, migration, and borderland identity. Religious recitations and nasheed chants are widespread, especially during Ramadan, funerals, and important religious gatherings. Public music performances have declined since 2021, but private family events continue to preserve musical traditions.

=== Dresses and attire ===
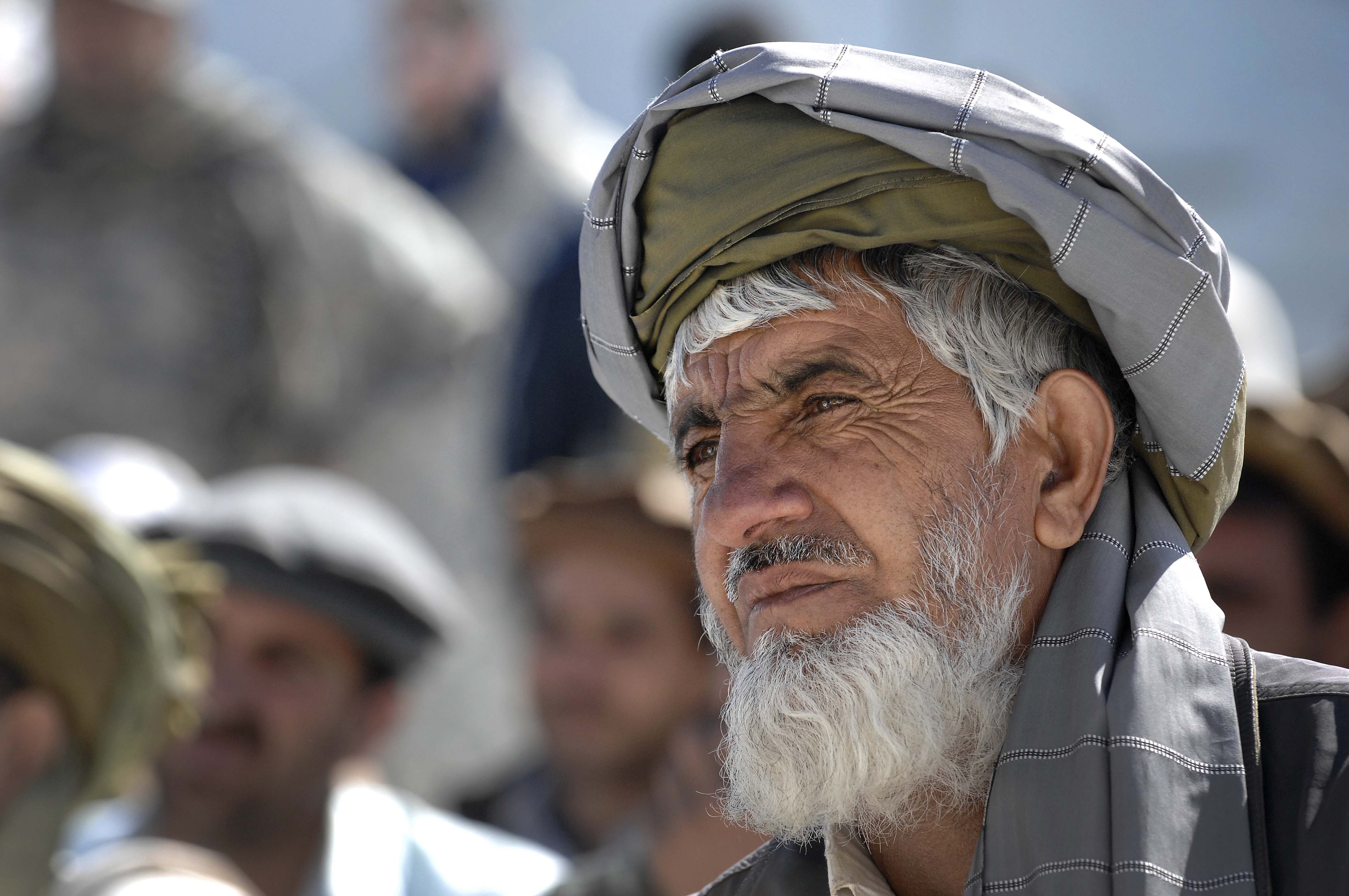
Paktiawal man wearing a typical turban

Traditional dress in Paktia reflects both Pashtun customs and the mountainous environment. Men commonly wear perahan o tunban, often combined with woolen shawls and tightly wrapped turbans adapted for cold winters. In rural areas, embroidered waistcoats and leather belts remain common. Women traditionally wear long dresses with colorful embroidery, mirror work, and layered scarves or veils. Jewelry is often modest, with silver ornaments used more frequently than gold. Clothing styles may vary between tribes such as the Zadran, Mangal, and Ahmadzai, but conservative dress norms remain widespread across the province.

=== Cuisine ===
Paktia's cuisine is shaped by its mountain agriculture and livestock economy. Wheat bread, rice, lamb, and dairy products form the core of daily nutrition. Popular dishes include qabeli palaw, qormas with beans and potatoes, and grilled kababs. Yogurt, qurut, and fresh milk are commonly consumed. Wild herbs and mountain greens are used seasonally in soups and side dishes. Tea, especially green tea, is served throughout the day in homes, guest rooms, and tribal gatherings. Compared to southern Afghanistan, fruit cultivation is less prominent, but apples, walnuts, and mulberries are locally important.

=== Architecture, art, and literature ===
Traditional architecture in Paktia is adapted to mountainous terrain and cold winters. Homes are commonly built from stone, mudbrick, and timber, with flat or gently sloped roofs. Many villages feature compact housing clusters for defensive and climatic reasons. Mosques serve as both religious and community centers. Local crafts include carpet weaving, embroidery, wool processing, and wood carving. Oral literature remains highly important, with Pashto poetry, epic storytelling, and tribal history recounted through recitations during gatherings. Poets, religious scholars, and tribal elders play a central role in preserving cultural memory.

=== Media, entertainment, and festivities ===
Radio remains the most important media source in rural Paktia, with broadcasts from national Pashto stations and regional outlets. Television and mobile internet are accessible mainly in Gardez and district centers. Major cultural celebrations include Eid al-Fitr, Eid al-Adha, weddings, and circumcision ceremonies, which traditionally involve communal meals, music, and dance. Since 2021, public entertainment has been restricted under Taliban rule, leading to fewer public celebrations, while private family gatherings continue cultural practices with limited visibility.

=== Places of interest ===
Paktia contains a range of cultural and natural landmarks, although most remain locally known rather than nationally prominent. The historic core of Gardez includes old mosques, bazaars, and traditional neighborhoods. Several tribal shrines and burial sites of local religious figures attract visitors from surrounding districts. The mountainous landscapes of eastern Paktia, with forested valleys and highland pastures, also hold cultural significance for seasonal migration and pastoral traditions. Many sites remain undocumented due to decades of conflict and limited archaeological research.

=== Sports ===
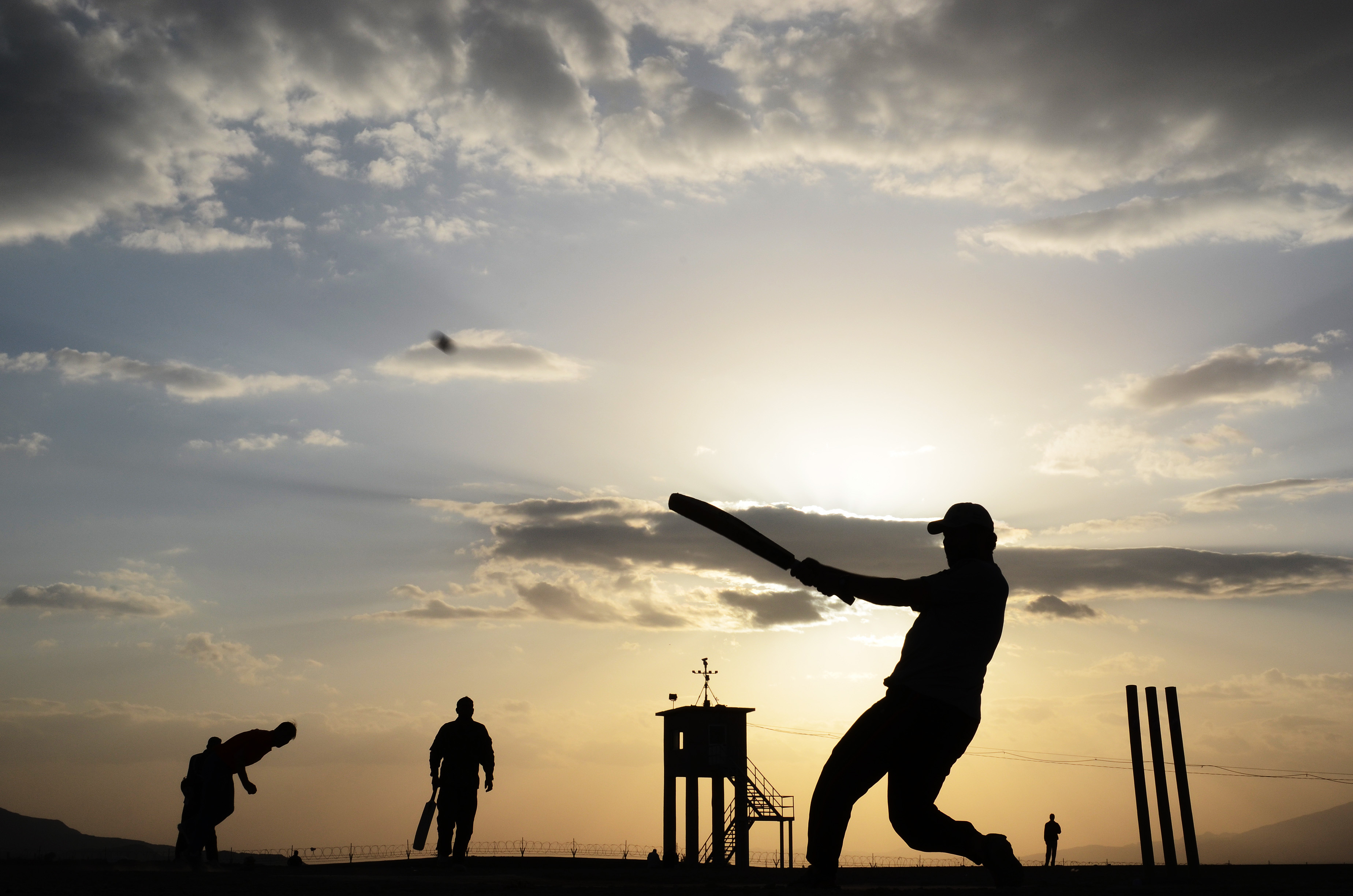
Paktiawal men playing cricket

Traditional sports in Paktia have included buzkashi in open plains and valleys, as well as local forms of wrestling and strength competitions during festivals. Horse riding remains associated with tribal prestige. In recent decades, cricket and football have become the most popular modern sports, especially among youth. Informal football pitches and cricket grounds exist in Gardez and district centers. Volleyball is also widely played due to low equipment requirements. Private gyms support boxing, taekwondo, and basic fitness training, mainly in urban areas.

In national cricket competitions such as the Shpageeza Cricket League, Paktia is represented by the Mis Ainak Knights franchise, which covers the southeastern provinces. During the period of the Islamic Republic, Paktia was represented in national football competitions through De Abasin Sape FC, which served as the regional team for Paktia together with Khost, Paktika and Logar in the Afghan Premier League. In the successor competition, the Afghanistan Champions League, Paktia is represented through Wahidy FC.

== Notable people ==
=== Historical figures ===
- The Gardēzī Sayyids are a historically significant lineage of Sadaat originating from Gardez who are traditionally regarded as descendants of Husayn ibn Ali and played an important role as religious scholars, Sufi figures and local elites in eastern Afghanistan and the Indian subcontinent. Key figures include:
  - Husam ad-Din Manikpuri, medieval Sufi saint and scholar associated with the Gardēzī Sayyid tradition in India

=== Modern figures ===
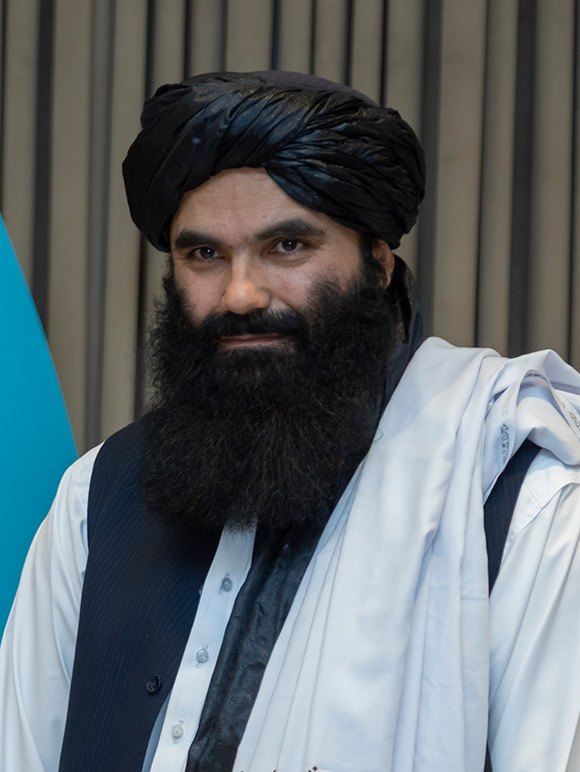
Sirajuddin Haqqani, interior minister and leader of the Haqqani network which hails from Paktia

- Javed Amirkhil, singer
- Musa Khan Ahmadzai, politician and governor
- Farid Basharat, Paktia-born English mixed martial arts (MMA) fighter
- Javid Basharat, Paktia-born English MMA fighter
- Allah Mohammad Ghazanfar, national cricket player
- Jalaluddin Haqqani, politician, former minister, and founder of the Haqqani network
- Khalil Haqqani, politician and former minister
- Sirajuddin Haqqani, politician, minister, and leader of the Haqqani network
- Abdul Kabir, politician, minister, and former acting Prime Minister of Afghanistan
- Amir Mangal, Paktia-born German national cricket player
- Mohammad Gulab Mangal, politician, former minister and governor
- Munir Mangal, politician and former acting minister
- Abdul Latif Mansour, politician and minister
- Zabihullah Mujahid, politician and Taliban spokesman
- Abdul Hakim Munib, politician and governor
- Mohammad Asif Nang, politician and former governor
- Mohammad Ashraf Naseri, politician and former governor
- Rahmat Shah, national cricket player
- Djelaludin Sharityar, national football player
- Pacha Gul Wafadar, politician and former minister
- Hazratullah Zazai, national cricket player
