= Jeremy Wise =

American Navy SEAL (1974–2009)

Jeremy Jason Wise (February 20, 1974 – December 30, 2009) was an American Navy SEAL and Central Intelligence Agency contractor. He was killed in a suicide bombing at Forward Operating Base Chapman in Khost, Afghanistan on December 30, 2009.

== Early life and education ==
Wise was born in 1974 to Dr. Jean and Mary Wise in Camden, Arkansas. He grew up in southern Arkansas, Hope, Arkansas, where he attended Westside Christian School in El Dorado. He later graduated from Hendrix College in Conway, Arkansas.

== Military career ==
Wise joined the United States Navy in 2001 and served as a Navy SEAL on a special-warfare team until September 2009, when he left the service. His career included multiple deployments and specialized missions. After leaving the Navy, Wise worked as a security contractor for the CIA in Afghanistan. On December 30, 2009, Wise was killed in the Camp Chapman attack at Forward Operating Base Chapman in Khost, Afghanistan. The bombing was carried out by Humam Khalil al-Balawi, a Jordanian double agent.

Wise's death was part of a series of tragic events for his family. His brother, Benjamin Wise, a Green Beret, died in Afghanistan in January 2012 from injuries sustained in combat. Another brother, Beau Wise, also served in the U.S. military as a Marine and was subsequently removed from combat zones by the military as a precaution, making him the only known service member to be pulled from combat, in the Sole Survivor Policy, after losing two brothers in the Global War on Terror.

== Legacy ==
Wise was married and had one child at the time of his death. Wise's name is inscribed on the CIA Memorial Wall, which honors agency personnel who have died in the line of duty. Hendrix College named their football stadium "Young-Wise Memorial Stadium" to honor the Wise brothers. A book entitled The Three Wise Men tells the story of the Wise family's sacrifice.

=== Lawsuit ===
After his death, the Wise family sued HSBC, alleging that the bank violated federal anti-terrorism laws through its financial dealings with banks tied to al-Qaeda, including Iran's Bank Melli and Bank Saderat, and Saudi Arabia's Al Rajhi Bank. The lawsuit was linked to the Camp Chapman Attack, carried out by al-Qaeda. However, the court of appeals dismissed the case, finding insufficient evidence to directly connect HSBC's actions to the attack.
