= Scott Roberson =

American intelligence officer

Scott Michael Roberson (1970–2009) was an American intelligence officer and former police detective. He was killed in the Camp Chapman attack in Khost, Afghanistan, a suicide bombing that targeted Central Intelligence Agency personnel. He had a long career in law enforcement and international security. He was known for his work in counterterrorism.

== Early life and education ==
Roberson was born in Manchester, Ohio, and raised in Tolland, Connecticut. He is the son of Harry and Sally Roberson of Stow, Ohio. He attended Tolland High School and later completed high school at Sycamore High School (Cincinnati, Ohio). He earned a degree in criminology from Florida State University. Roberson was an avid Brazilian Jiu-Jitsu (BJJ) practitioner.

== Career ==
=== Law enforcement ===
He started his career with the Atlanta Police Department, working undercover in the Narcotics division before transitioning to international security. After serving with the Atlanta Police Department, where he worked undercover in narcotics, he transitioned to global security roles, including in Kosovo and Iraq.

=== Security details ===
He served with United Nations security forces in Kosovo and completed multiple tours in Iraq, where he was responsible for protecting high-profile officials in high-risk environments.

=== CIA and death ===
Roberson joined the CIA shortly before his deployment to Afghanistan in 2009. On December 30, 2009, Roberson was killed in the Camp Chapman attack in Khost, Afghanistan. The attack was carried out by Humam Khalil al-Balawi, a Jordanian double agent who had gained the CIA's trust. The bombing was a significant loss for the CIA and led to widespread media coverage and internal reviews of security procedures. At the time, Roberson was working as a security officer for the CIA. He is buried at Arlington National Cemetery.

== Memorials and scholarship ==
After his death, the Tolland, Connecticut, community dedicated a bench in his name at Crandall Park. His family established the Scott M. Roberson Memorial Fund. The fund provides financial support to Tolland High School graduates pursuing undergraduate degrees who have shown a strong commitment to community service.
