= Elizabeth Hanson (CIA officer) =

American intelligence officer

- Born: February 14, 1979; Rockford, Illinois, U.S.
- Died: December 30, 2009 (aged 30); Khost, Afghanistan
- Resting place: Arlington National Cemetery
- Education: Colby College
- Occupation: intelligence officer

Elizabeth Curry Marie Hanson (February 14, 1979 – December 30, 2009) was an American intelligence officer who served with the Central Intelligence Agency (CIA). She was one of seven CIA employees killed in the 2009 Camp Chapman suicide bombing in Khost, Afghanistan.

== Early life and education ==
Hanson was born in Rockford, Illinois. She attended Keith Country Day School. A quote below her class photo was from novelist Ursula K. LeGuin: "It is good to have an end to journey toward; but it is the journey that matters, in the end." Hanson graduated in 2002 from Colby College in Waterville, Maine, where she majored in economics and minored in Russian language and literature.

== CIA career ==
=== Early career ===
Hanson began her career with the CIA in 2005 at 26 years old. She initially working under the cover of a Washington-based consulting firm, quickly rose through the ranks due to her skills as a "targeter." Her role involved analyzing vast amounts of intelligence data, including intercepted communications and reports from informants, to track high-profile terrorists. She played a key part in recommending actions based on this intelligence, often leading to targeted drone missile strikes, although she did not make the final call on such operations.

=== Promotion to Lead Targeter ===
Known for her ability to synthesize complex information and for her innovative approach to hunting terrorists, Hanson earned the respect and admiration of her colleagues and supervisors, including former CIA directors Leon Panetta and Michael Hayden. Her talents led to her promotion as a lead targeter in a high-level group focused on dismantling al-Qaeda, including tracking down Osama bin Laden.

=== Personality ===
Despite her serious responsibilities, Hanson was known for her casual style and approachable personality, often seen in jeans and flip-flops at the CIA's Langley headquarters. She balanced a lighthearted demeanor with the ability to remain calm and methodical in her work.

=== Deployment to Afghanistan and death ===
In 2009, Hanson volunteered for a deployment to Afghanistan, seeking to gain field experience and further develop her skills. On December 30, 2009, Hanson was killed in the Camp Chapman attack in Khost, Afghanistan. The attack was carried out by Humam Khalil al-Balawi, a Jordanian double agent who had gained the CIA's trust. The bombing was a significant loss for the CIA and led to widespread media coverage and internal reviews of security procedures. Military doctors attempted to save her life but were unsuccessful.

=== Legacy and memorials ===
Hanson is buried in section 60 of Arlington National Cemetery. CIA Director Leon Panetta attended her funeral. A star was carved into the CIA Memorial Wall to honor Hanson. The CIA posted the following on their website: “Elizabeth Hanson was a gifted innovator in fighting terrorists; a woman with boundless energy and a quick wit who relished the challenge of her work and was committed to excellence and integrity in everything she did.” The former mayor of Rockford Larry Morrissey declared May 25, 2015, as "Elizabeth Hanson Day." In 2015, a former resident of Rockford, along with the staff of Keith Country Day, installed a plaque next to Hanson's grave.

=== Depictions in media and books ===
Hanson's life and the events leading up to her death are depicted in Zero Dark Thirty and chronicled in former CIA Director Leon Panetta's memoir Worthy Fights and Joby Warrick's book The Triple Agent.
