= Dane Paresi =

US Army Master Sergeant (1963–2009)

Dane Clark Paresi (October 22, 1963 – December 30, 2009) was a United States Army Master Sergeant and military contractor for the Central Intelligence Agency. He was killed in a suicide bombing while working for Xe Services (formerly Blackwater) at a CIA base in Khost, Afghanistan.

== Early life and education ==
Paresi, the son of a Vietnam War veteran, was born at Seattle's Fort Lawton. He was raised mostly in Portland, Oregon. He graduated from Marshall High School in Portland in 1982. Two days after graduation, he enlisted in the United States Army, beginning his military career at Fort Dix, New Jersey.

== Military career ==
Paresi served in the U.S. Army for 27 years, retiring as a Master Sergeant in 2008. He was a member of the 1st Special Forces Group based at Fort Lewis, Washington. Throughout his career, he served in various countries, including Mauritania, the Philippines, Iraq, Bosnia, Rwanda, Malawi, Benin, Kenya, and Afghanistan. He received numerous military decorations during his service, including the Bronze Star, National Defense Service Medal, Army Commendation Medal, and the NATO Medal. Some of these medals were awarded multiple times.

=== Death ===
After retiring from the Army, Paresi worked as a contractor for Xe Services. In late 2009, he was deployed to Afghanistan, where he was assigned to a Forward Operating Base Chapman in Khost, near the Pakistani border. On December 30, 2009, Paresi was killed in a suicide bombing at the CIA base. The bomber, a Jordanian double agent, detonated explosives during a meeting at the base, killing seven Americans, including the chief of the CIA post. Paresi was among the first to confront the bomber, a decision that likely prevented further casualties.

Paresi's funeral was held on January 23, 2010, at Evergreen Memorial Gardens in Vancouver, Washington. U.S. senator Ron Wyden, a member of the Senate Intelligence Committee, attended the service. Paresi was later buried with full military honors at Willamette National Cemetery in Portland, Oregon.

=== Lawsuits ===
After his death, Paresi's family sued HSBC, alleging that the bank violated federal anti-terrorism laws through its financial dealings with banks tied to al-Qaeda, including Iran's Bank Melli and Bank Saderat, and Saudi Arabia's Al Rajhi Bank. The lawsuit was linked to the Camp Chapman Attack, carried out by al-Qaeda. However, the court of appeals dismissed the case, finding insufficient evidence to directly connect HSBC's actions to the attack. Paresi's family won a $268 million default judgment against Iran for its role in providing safe harbor and resources to al-Qaeda.

== Personal life ==
Paresi was married to his wife, MindyLou. They had two daughters, Alexandra and Santina.
