= Darren LaBonte =

American CIA officer and soldier (1974–2009)

Darren James LaBonte (October 10, 1974 – December 30, 2009) was an American officer in the Central Intelligence Agency, former U.S. Army Ranger, and agent with the Federal Bureau of Investigation. LaBonte was one of seven Americans killed in a suicide bombing at a U.S. military base in Khost, Afghanistan, in December 2009. The Camp Chapman attack also claimed the lives of a Jordanian intelligence officer and two American security contractors. The bombing, which targeted CIA personnel, occurred during an operation believed to be a breakthrough in the hunt for senior al-Qaeda leader Ayman al-Zawahiri.

== Early life and education ==
LaBonte was born October 10, 1974, in Waterbury, Connecticut and grew up in Brookfield, Connecticut. He attended Brookfield High School, where he played football and baseball. He declined an offer from the Cleveland Indians after graduating high school in 1992.

After graduating, LaBonte instead enlisted in the United States Army. He earned a place in the 75th Ranger Regiment, First Battalion, where he served as an Army Ranger, one of the military's most elite units. He later left the Army to pursue higher education, attending Columbia College of Missouri and obtaining a master's degree in criminal justice from Boston University in 2006.

== Military and law enforcement career ==
After completing his military service, LaBonte worked in various law enforcement roles. He served as a police officer in Libertyville, Illinois, and later joined the U.S. Marshals Service. LaBonte later joined the Federal Bureau of Investigation as a federal agent, where he worked before joining the CIA in 2006.

=== CIA service ===
LaBonte joined the CIA during a time of heightened counterterrorism operations following the attacks of September 11, 2001. He served Iraq, Afghanistan, and Amman, Jordan. His intelligence work focused on counterterrorism efforts, and he was involved in operations targeting senior al-Qaeda leaders.

==== Death ====
On December 30, 2009, LaBonte was among seven CIA officers and contractors killed in a suicide bombing at Forward Operating Base Chapman in Khost, Afghanistan. The bombing, carried out by a Jordanian double agent, Humam Khalil Abu-Mulal al-Balawi, targeted CIA personnel involved in efforts to track down Ayman al-Zawahiri, al-Qaeda's second-in-command. LaBonte was 35 years old at the time of his death.

===== Concerns about Balawi =====
In a Washington Post interview, the widower of Jennifer Matthews said LaBonte had raised concerns about al-Balawi's trustworthiness before the Khost meeting but couldn't convince others to stop him from entering the base without being searched. As told in Joby Warrick's book The Triple Agent, LaBonte expressed deep skepticism about Balawi, saying, "This guy is too good to be true." His main concerns were that the operation involved too many people, was unfolding too rapidly, and that Balawi was setting the conditions. Former CIA officers including Michael Morell have given interviews and published commentary about the circumstances of the Camp Chapman attack.

==== Burial and memorial ====
LaBonte was buried with honors at Arlington National Cemetery on February 1, 2010. A bench in the memorial garden of his hometown, Brookfield, Connecticut, bears a plaque with LaBonte's name. A star was carved into the CIA Memorial Wall to honor him.

== Personal life ==
LaBonte met his wife, Racheal, in 1999, and the couple married in 2000. They had a daughter. At the time of his death, the family was living in Amman, Jordan, where LaBonte had been posted before his final assignment in Afghanistan.
