= Marshall High School (Portland, Oregon) =

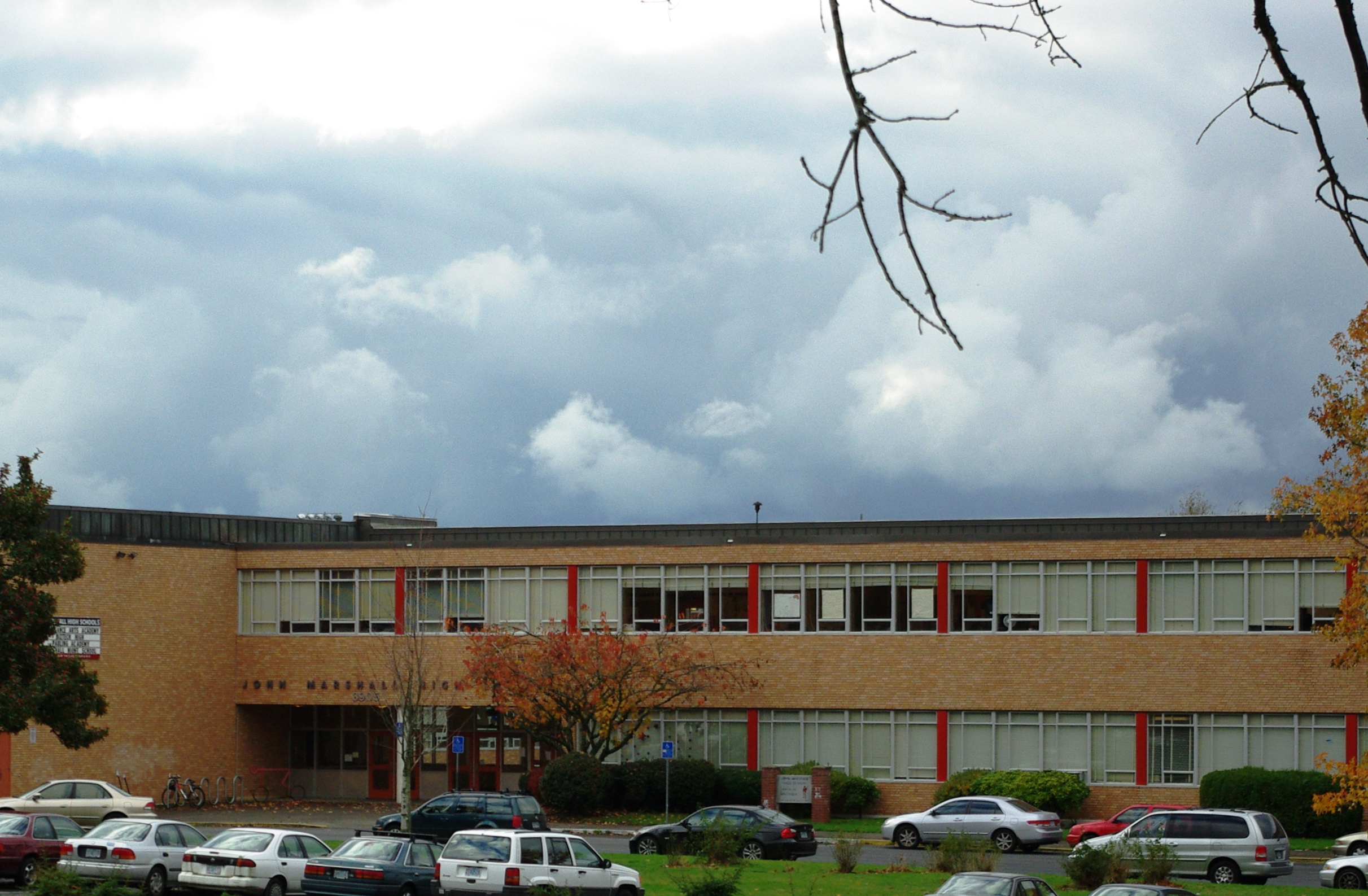

Location
- 3905 SE 91st Avenue; Portland, Multnomah County, Oregon 97266; United States; 45.494088°N 122.572349°W

Information
- Type: Public
- Opened: 1960
- Closed: 2011
- School district: Portland Public Schools
- Grades: 9–12
- Enrollment: 751
- Colors: Scarlet, navy, and white
- Athletics conference: OSAA Portland Interscholastic League 5A-1
- Mascot: Minutemen
- Website: www.marshall.pps.k12.or.us

Marshall High School is a former public high school in Portland, Oregon, United States. The school opened on September 6, 1960, and is named after John Marshall, the fourth Chief Justice of the United States. The school was closed in 2011 as the Portland Public Schools district moved to consolidate students and resources into fewer high schools.

== History ==
Marshall was built to accommodate 2,400 students, although only 1300 enrolled in its first year. It cost $4,731,506 to build, and included 42 classrooms. It had a library, which projects from a corner of the building into the courtyard, had 7000 books in its first year, and a cafeteria which seated 800 students. Students were drawn from areas previously served by Franklin and Madison High Schools.

Marshall was designed by the firm Stanton, Boles, Maguire & Church, which also designed the campus of Lewis and Clark College. Marshall had several innovative design features. It was designed to have conference rooms connected to classrooms, with windows between them, to allow teachers to either meet with individual students while keeping an eye on the class as a whole or let students study in the conference room while teaching a class in the main classroom. It put lockers in all teachers classrooms, for storing personal belongings. Despite these design features, it is not eligible for the National Register of Historic Places, since, unlike Jackson Middle School and Ida B. Wells-Barnett High School, it does not demonstrate as high a level of innovation in its design.

In the mid-1960s, Marshall experimented with an innovative program, developed by a team of professors at the Stanford School of Education, which gave students the opportunity to complete homework during an extended school day. This program structured the school more like a college, to better prepare students for college. Students spent just two thirds of their day in class, leaving the other third open for studying, researching, or sitting in on other classes. Classes also varied in length, resulting in a complicated schedule based upon 20-minute modules, which was created by an IBM 7090. While the reaction was generally positive, there were some problems with the experiment. Not all teachers adjusted well to the student-discussion focused classes, and some students goofed off instead of studying during the free third of their school day. The school encouraged collaboration between teachers, which many saw as positive.

== Student profile ==
In its last year of operation, the student population was 45% white, 23% Latino, 16% Asian/Pacific Islander, and 10% African American. The Marshall boundaries contained more potential students (1640) than any other in the Portland area, though the Marshall enrollment was only 751 students. In 2009, 9% of the students transferred into the school.

== Academics ==
From 2004, until its closing in 2011, Marshall consisted of four small schools: the BizTech High School of Business and Technology, the Portland Academy of International Studies, the Linus Pauling "Academy of Integrated Sciences", and the Renaissance Arts Academy.

- BizTech High School of Business and Technology In 2008, 42% of the school's seniors received their high school diploma. Of 62 students, 26 graduated, 23 dropped out, 4 received a modified diploma, and 9 were still in high school. In 2009–2010, the school had 288 students.
- Pauling Academy of Integrated Sciences In 2008, 58% of the school's seniors received their high school diploma. Of 71 students, 41 graduated, 20 dropped out, 5 received a modified diploma, and 5 were still in high school. In 2009–2010, the school had 175 students.
- Renaissance Arts Academy In 2008, 44% of the school's seniors received their high school diploma. Of 61 students, 27 graduated, 22 dropped out, 7 received a modified diploma, and 5 were still in high school. In 2009–2010, the school had 288 students.

== Athletics ==
Among Marshall's most successful sports teams were the boys basketball teams (reaching the postseason in 2009–10) also the 1995-96 basketball team almost reach the post season they were one game shy of making the post season. And the cheerleading squad (which finished 4th in Oregon in 2009–10). The girls basketball team won two consecutive state championships in 1981 and 1982. Coached by Ken Trapp and John Hughes, the 1981 championship team was the first in Oregon history to finish undefeated at 26–0. Coached by Rod Jones, the girls volleyball team won the state championship in 1978 and finished second in 1982, 1985 and in 1987 second under coach John Hughes. In 1980 the girls soccer team reached the quarter-finals. In 1981 the softball team finished 3rd in the state. Marshall football reached the state quarterfinals in 1973, and last reached the playoffs since 2003, but hadn't won a playoff football game since 1990. The school recorded the first winless season in the school's 50-year history during the 2007–2008 season after falling in the last game of the season to also winless Roosevelt High School 25–22 in a match-up of two teams that have struggled for the better part of the decade. JMHS hired a new football coach on June 23, 2010.

== Notable alumni ==
- Nick Jones, basketball player
- Dane Paresi, United States Army Master Sergeant and military contractor for the Central Intelligence Agency killed in Camp Chapman attack
- Ward Weaver III, convicted murderer

== Use as a "hotel school" during PPS renovations ==
After its closure in 2011, the Marshall Campus became a "hotel school", temporarily housing students of several Portland high schools during renovations to their campuses. Classes from the following high schools took place, and continue to take place, on the Marshall campus:

- Franklin High School from 2015 to 2017
- Grant High School from 2017 to 2019
- Leodis V. McDaniel High School from 2019 to 2021; formerly named Madison High School
- Benson Polytechnic High School from 2021 to 2024; renovations finished in summer 2024
- Cleveland High School from 2026 to 2029
