= Keith Country Day School =

Location
- 1 Jacoby Place; Rockford, Illinois 61107; United States; 42.2857°N 89.0630°W

Information
- Established: 1916
- CEEB code: 143706
- Head of school: Charo Chaney
- Teaching staff: 37 (as of 2023-24)
- Grades: PK-12
- Enrollment: 343 (as of 2005-06)
- Student to teacher ratio: 7.9 (as of 2021-22)
- Colors: Blue and Red
- Mascot: Cougar
- Website: Keith Country Day School

Keith Country Day School is a private, fully accredited, independent, nonsectarian, college-preparatory school located in Rockford, Illinois, USA. It serves students from the preschool level (referred to as "cottage") to 12th grade.

== History ==
Keith Country Day School was founded in 1916 by Charlotte Belle Emerson Keith.

Situated on a 15-acre (61,000 m^{2}) campus adjacent to Rockford's Sinnissippi Park and overlooking the Rock River, Keith School, as it is commonly referred to, is located at 1 Jacoby Place, on the site of the former Shoudy Mansion and carriage house. The Shoudy family owned three 10-acre (40,000 m^{2}) lots overlooking the Rock River along North Second Street between the Lysander Jacoby House to the north and the park and golf course to the south. Fred and Louise Shoudy sold their home on the lot adjacent to the Jacoby House to Mrs. Keith around 1920. This property included a tennis court used by the school for many years.

=== Divisions of the School ===
Keith School is divided into three separate schools:

- The Lower School, which encompasses The Keith Cottage (an early education program for three-year-olds), Junior Kindergarten (students from four to five years old) and Kindergarten through fifth grade;
- the Middle School, which encompasses sixth, seventh and eighth grades, and
- the Upper School, which encompasses ninth through twelfth grades.

The Lower School and Upper School have separate Heads who are responsible for reporting to the overall Head of School, formerly known as the Headmaster; this title was changed upon the appointment of Roberta Ingrassia, the second female Head after Belle Emerson Keith. The school also has a Board of Trustees, a twelve-member appointed board which serves as the governing body of the school. It is composed of the Head of School and past and present parents of Keith students, along with prominent civic figures.

=== Technological Advancements ===
In 1998, Keith became the first school in Illinois to develop a comprehensive laptop computer program. This connected learning environment provides networked laptop computers for every sixth through 12th grade student and teacher, high-speed wireless access, individual email addresses for students and teachers, a Lower School computer lab and classroom computer centers, and a library with access to global electronic databases.

== Curriculum/Graduation Requirements ==
Keith School boasts a college-preparatory curriculum with all classes in the Upper School taught at the Honors level. Several Advanced Placement classes are also available.

In order to graduate from Keith School, Upper School students are required to take at least five academic courses per semester in a variety of fields, including English, Social Studies/History, Mathematics, Science, Foreign Language (Latin, Ancient Greek, French, or Spanish), Speech/Communications, Fine Arts (Visual, Performing or Dramatic), Physical Education and Health.

Students are also required to complete two semesters of College Counseling, during which they are guided through the college and scholarship application process. In addition, Upper School students must complete at least 90 hours of Community Service, no more than 45 of which may be completed through Keith School. Keith seniors are also each required to complete a Senior Project, which is a student-designed, faculty-assisted program allowing students to explore areas of interest or experience real-world job situations relevant to their intended career goals. Students must also pass U.S. and Illinois Constitution tests.

=== Homeschooled Student Program ===
Keith School also opens its classes to qualified home-schooled students as a supplement to a 6th through 12th grade student's home curriculum. Students may study a foreign language, add a lab-based science (sixth, seventh, eighth grade, or Biology, Chemistry, Physics, or Environmental Science), delve into an AP (Advanced Placement) course in English, U.S. History, Biology, Calculus AB or BC, Music Theory, Physics, European History, Chemistry, or Statistics. They can also explore a music, art, or drama class.

== Extracurricular activities ==
Keith students are encouraged to organize extracurricular activities and to form and join clubs. Some current extracurriculars include: Amnesty International, Scholastic Bowl, Middle and Upper School Choir, Band, Theatrical Productions and Plays, Brownies/Girl Scouts/Cub Scouts, Model United Nations of the University of Chicago, Certamen, National Honor Society, International Club, Dissection Club, SADD (Students Against Destructive Decisions), Energy Net, Philosophy Club, Environmental Club, Snow Sculpting Team, Spanish Club, Film Club, French Club, French Honor Society, Jazz Band, Strings Ensemble, Geography Bee, Student Government, Habitat for Humanity, Ping-Pong/Table Tennis Club, Honor Council, Instrumental Ensemble, Interact Club, and Yearbook.

Keith also hosts an annual spelling bee for fifth to eighth graders, the winner of which goes on to compete at the state level.

=== Athletic and Academic Competition in IHSA ===
Keith Country Day School's sports teams are nicknamed the Cougars. They compete in the Illinois High School Association Division 1A for athletics and academic competitions. The school has found its most success in Girls' Volleyball, winning three consecutive state titles from 2013-2015 with a record of 111-12 over those three seasons. The Boys' Soccer team placed 3rd in IHSA Division 1A in 2010 and 2016, while the Scholastic Bowl team placed 3rd in 2011, 2012, and 2013.

=== Keith School Parent Association (KPA) ===
All parents of Keith Country Day School students are members of the Parents’ Association, an organization that exists to promote friendly relationships among parents, to acquaint them with the spirit of Keith School, to obtain their cooperation with its objectives for the development of their children, and to initiate parents’ involvement in projects and functions which aid the school academically, socially and financially.

The Keith Parents’ Association (KPA) also serves the important function of communicating ideas, concerns, and support to the administration and faculty of Keith School. The KPA meets once a month to discuss the Association's fundraising activities as well as extra-curricular events planned and coordinated by its officers and members. The KPA is also an important means of communication to the administration of the school. At each KPA meeting, the Head of School and other administrators submit reports regarding the health of the school. At these meetings, it is possible for parents to ask appropriate questions of the administration regarding any aspect of school operations. The officers of the Association stay in consistent contact with the administration and with parents.

Monetary grants are made each year to teachers and school staff members by the KPA for numerous curricular and extra-curricular activities, and the KPA contributes significantly to the Sports, Music, and Drama departments in both the Upper and Lower Schools.

== Notable alumni ==
- Shawn Ryan, creator of the FX television series The Shield and CBS series The Unit.
- Kelly Killoren Bensimon, star of The Real Housewives of New York City.
- Elizabeth Hanson, one of 7 CIA agents killed in the Camp Chapman attack.
- Heather Nauert, former Undersecretary of State for Public Diplomacy and Public Affairs, former Fox News reporter and breaking news anchor on “Fox & Friends”
