= Camp Chapman attack =

2009 suicide bombing of a US Armed Forces base in Khost Province, Afghanistan

- Part of the war in Afghanistan
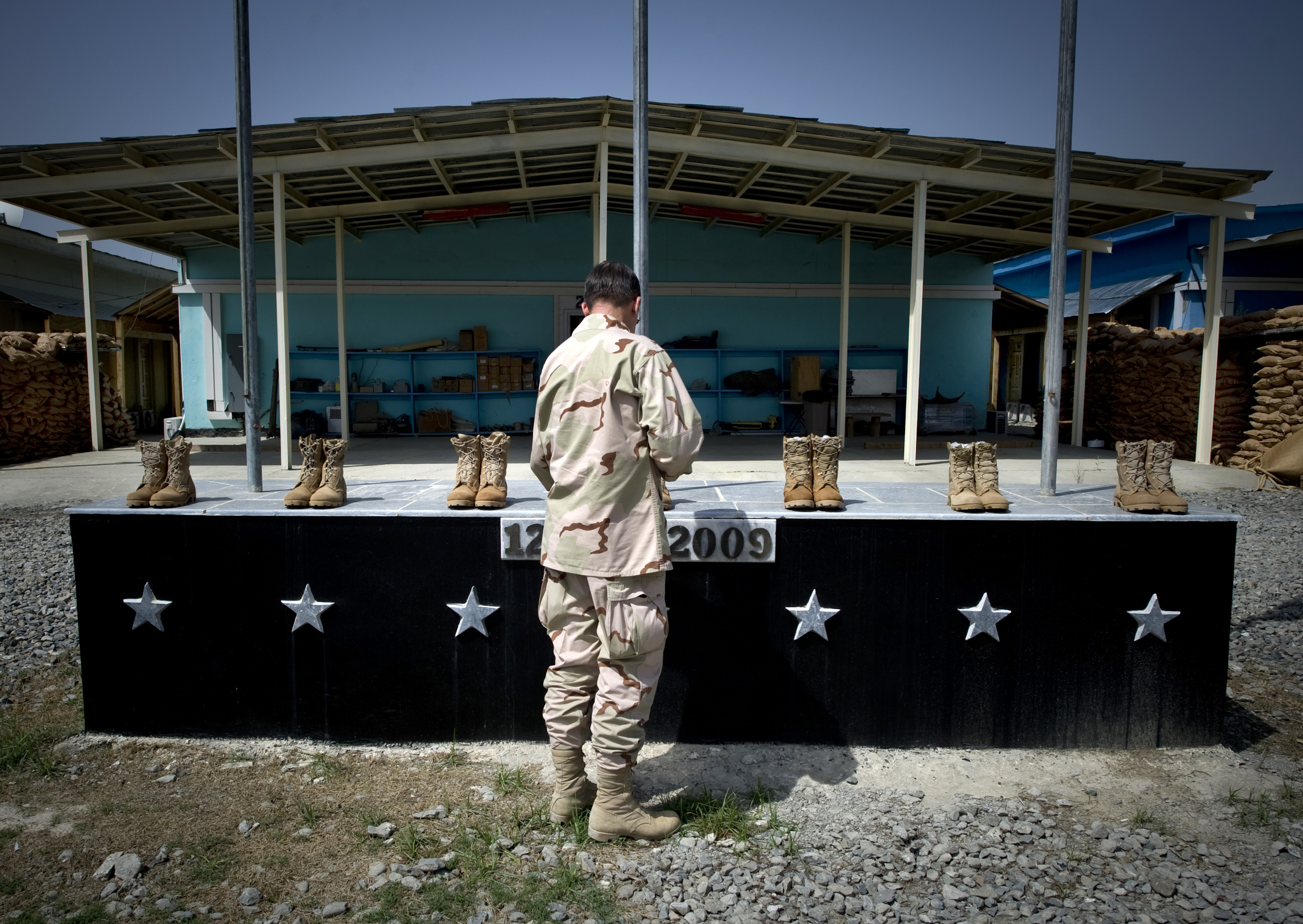
- Admiral Michael Mullen at a memorial for the seven American victims of the attack

- Forward Operating Base Chapman (Afghanistan)
- Location: 33°20′19.5″N 69°57′21.4″E; Khost Province, Afghanistan
- Date: 30 December 2009; 16 years ago (UTC+4:30)
- Target: Forward Operating Base Chapman
- Attack type: Suicide attack
- Deaths: 10 (including the attacker)
- Injuries: 6
- Victim: Central Intelligence Agency
- Perpetrators: al-Qaeda; Pakistani Taliban
- Assailant: Humam Khalil Abu-Mulal al-Balawi ‡‡

The Camp Chapman attack was a suicide attack by Humam Khalil Abu-Mulal al-Balawi against the Central Intelligence Agency facility inside Forward Operating Base Chapman in Afghanistan on December 30, 2009. One of the main tasks of the CIA personnel stationed at the base was to provide intelligence supporting drone attacks in Pakistan. Seven American CIA officers and contractors, a Jordanian intelligence officer, and an Afghan working for the CIA were killed when al-Balawi detonated a bomb sewn into a vest he was wearing. Six other American CIA officers were wounded. The bombing was the most lethal attack against the CIA in more than 25 years.

Al-Balawi was a Jordanian doctor and jihadist website writer who was detained and interrogated over three days by the Jordanian intelligence service, the General Intelligence Directorate (GID). The GID and the CIA thought al-Balawi was someone who could penetrate al-Qaeda in the Pakistani tribal areas to provide intelligence for high-level targets. Instead, al-Balawi used this trust to gain access to the CIA base in Afghanistan unsearched and perpetrate the attack. Al-Qaeda and Tehrik-i-Taliban Pakistan claimed responsibility, saying they helped al-Balawi with the attack. After the attack, the families of the victims sued Iran, and won a judgement of $268,553,684 on March 22, 2023. However, it is unlikely that the victims will receive any compensation, as the US Department of State noted in the case that "The United States does not maintain diplomatic relations with the government of Iran."

== Attack ==
On December 30, 2009, Humam Khalil Abu-Mulal al-Balawi was picked up by Arghawan, an Afghan who was the chief of external security at Camp Chapman, at the border between Miranshah, Pakistan, and Khost, Afghanistan. Arghawan drove al-Balawi to Camp Chapman, arriving around 4:30 p.m.

The car was waved through three security checkpoints without stopping before arriving at its destination well within the base. Sixteen people were waiting for the car near a building set up to debrief al-Balawi and had even baked him a birthday cake as a gesture of goodwill. Al-Balawi then got out of the vehicle and detonated the explosives hidden in his suicide vest.

Al-Balawi and nine other people were killed by the blast. Seven were CIA personnel: five officers, including the chief of the base, and two contractors. One was a Jordanian intelligence officer and another was the Afghan driver. Six other CIA personnel were seriously wounded in the attack, including the deputy chief of Kabul station. Some of those killed had already approached the bomber to search him, whereas others killed were standing some distance away. At least 13 intelligence officers were within 50 feet (20 m) of al-Balawi when the bomb went off.

After the attack, the base was secured and 150 mostly Afghan workers were detained and held incommunicado for three days. The attack was a major setback for the intelligence agency's operations in Afghanistan and Pakistan. It was the second largest single-day loss in the CIA's history, after the 1983 United States Embassy bombing in Beirut, Lebanon, which killed eight CIA officers. The incident suggested that al-Qaeda might not be as weakened as previously thought.

=== Attacker ===
==== Humam Khalil Abu-Mulal al-Balawi ====
Al-Balawi, 32, was a Jordanian doctor who worked at a clinic for Palestinian refugee women and children in the Marka refugee camp near Amman, Jordan. He was an al-Qaeda sympathizer from the town of Zarqa, the home town of Jordanian militant Islamist Abu Musab al-Zarqawi. He was married and had two daughters. Islamist websites, as well as some newspapers, characterized the attacker as a triple agent, someone who is believed to be a double agent by the intelligence organization he infiltrates.

Al-Balawi had a history of supporting violent Islamist causes online under the pseudonym Abu Dujana al-Khurasani. Al-Balawi became an administrator and a well-known contributor for al-Hesbah, an online jihadist forum. He had tried to rehabilitate the image of al-Zarqawi in Jordan after the 2005 Amman bombings. Jarrett Brachman, the former director of research at West Point's Combating Terrorism Center, said "since at least 2007, [Abu Dujana had] become one of the most prominent al-Qaida jihadist pundits."

Al-Balawi was arrested by Jordanian intelligence in January 2009 and held for three days. During al-Balawi's questioning, Jordanian intelligence officials threatened to have him jailed and end his medical career, and they hinted they could cause problems for his family. Al-Balawi was told that if he cooperated, his slate would be wiped clean and his family left alone. After this episode, the GID and CIA believed they had turned al-Balawi into a double agent. A plan was developed for al-Balawi to infiltrate al-Qaeda in the Federally Administered Tribal Areas in Pakistan, along the Afghan border. In March 2009, al-Balawi left Jordan and arrived in Peshawar, Pakistan, and made his way into the tribal areas. The CIA took over the management of al-Balawi from the Jordanians sometime in the second half of 2009, dictating how and when the informant would meet his handlers, according to current and former U.S. intelligence officers.

==== Meeting at Camp Chapman ====
Al-Balawi had been invited to Camp Chapman after claiming to have information related to senior al-Qaeda leader Ayman al-Zawahiri. Al-Balawi was not searched as a sign of respect because of his perceived value as someone who could infiltrate the ranks of senior al-Qaeda leaders. A former U.S. counter-terrorism officer, as well as Jordanian government officials, said that he had already provided useful and actionable intelligence to the CIA over several weeks of undercover work in the region. A former intelligence official stated that al-Balawi was "feeding us low-level operatives and we were whacking them." He was seen by the CIA and the U.S. administration as the best hope of tracking down the al-Qaeda leadership. The CIA had come to trust al-Balawi and the Jordanian spy agency vouched for him, according to officials.

The deputy chief of Kabul station was present for the meeting, more evidence that al-Balawi was highly valued. The CIA was "expecting the meeting to be of such substance that following the meeting their next directive was to call President Obama," a security official in Kabul said.

==== Statements from relatives ====
Al-Balawi's wife, Defne Bayrak, a journalist who lives in Istanbul, Turkey, has translated several Arabic books into Turkish, including Osama bin Laden: Che Guevara of the East. She said the radicalization of al-Balawi started in 2003 because of the Iraq War. She doubted that al-Balawi worked as a double agent for the CIA and Jordan's intelligence agency or that he was an al-Qaeda member. Bayrak said that al-Balawi would have acted of his own volition because he regarded the United States as an adversary. She also said that she was proud of her husband. In her view, al-Balawi had carried out a "very important mission in such a war." Turkish police questioned and released Bayrak on January 7, 2010.

Al-Balawi's family is of Palestinian origin, from a tribe in the Beersheba region. His brother said al-Balawi had been "changed" by the 2008–09 Israeli offensive in Gaza, and that he had been arrested by Jordanian authorities after volunteering with medical organizations to treat wounded Palestinians in Gaza. Other family members said that al-Balawi had been pressured to become an informant after Jordanian authorities arrested him in January 2009.

Al-Balawi's father said he was called by an Afghan after the attack who told him his son died as a hero in an operation to kill CIA agents. He also said his son "sacrificed his body and soul for the oppressed." He blamed the intelligence agencies for turning his son "from a human, a doctor, to a person with a heart full of negative and hostile emotions towards others."

Jordanian authorities cautioned the relatives of al-Balawi against speaking with anyone about the incident. Members of the family said that Jordan security forces had sealed off the area in which they live, blocking journalists from entering and preventing any family gathering after they heard the news of al-Balawi's death.

=== Casualties ===
Fatalities, not including the suicide bomber
Name	Affiliation and position	Age
Jennifer Lynne Matthews	CIA, Chief of Base	45
Scott Michael Roberson	CIA, Base security chief	39
Darren James LaBonte	CIA, Amman Station case officer	35
Elizabeth Curry Marie Hanson	CIA, Kabul Station targeter	30
Harold Brown Jr.	CIA, case officer	37
Dane Clark Paresi	CIA, security contractor	46
Jeremy Jason Wise	CIA, security contractor	35
Sharif Ali bin Zeid	Jordanian intelligence officer	34
Arghawan	Afghan external security chief	30

Not including the attacker, nine people were killed and six others were seriously wounded in the attack. Seven of the dead were Americans working for the CIA. One was al-Balawi's Jordanian case officer and another was the Afghan in charge of external security for the base who had driven al-Balawi to the base from the Pakistan border. The CIA initially did not release the names of those killed in the attack. All officers on the base worked undercover.

Jennifer Lynne Matthews, the station chief, 45, was tracking al-Qaeda before the September 11 attacks. She joined the CIA in 1989 and was involved with the agency's Bin Laden Issue Station. A U.S. official said Matthews was "one of the US government's top experts on al-Qaeda and other terrorist groups." Matthews had been chief of the base since September 2009.

Besides Matthews, the CIA personnel killed included:

- Scott Michael Roberson, 39, the CIA base security chief, was a former Atlanta undercover narcotics officer and worked with the U.N in Kosovo.
- Darren LaBonte, 35, a CIA case officer based in Amman, Jordan, was al-Balawi's handler. LaBonte enlisted in the U.S. Army after high school, serving several years in the elite 75th Ranger Regiment. After leaving the military, he became a police officer in the Libertyville Police Department in Illinois, then joined the United States Marshals Service, working in Chicago from 2003 to 2005. He then briefly served in the FBI on an elite anti-crime unit in New York City before joining the CIA in 2006.
- Elizabeth Hanson, 30, a CIA targeting analyst at Kabul Station. An economics major from Colby College. Hanson had joined the CIA in 2005 when she was 26 years old.
- Harold Brown, Jr., 37, a CIA case officer, was a former U.S. Army intelligence officer.
- Dane Clark Paresi, 46, a security contractor, was a retired U.S. Army Master Sergeant and Green Beret with 1st Special Forces Group. A Bronze Star recipient, he served in Iraq, Somalia, Rwanda, Kenya, Bosnia and Southeast Asia throughout his 27 year career.
- Jeremy Wise, 35, a security contractor, was a former U.S. Navy SEAL.

Wise and Paresi were security contractors working for Xe Services (formerly Blackwater and known as Academi since 2011), a private security company.

The bodies of the CIA operatives were transferred to the U.S., and a private ceremony was held at Dover Air Force Base, which was attended by CIA director Leon Panetta.

CIA officers who had traveled from Kabul to the base for the meeting, including the Deputy Chief of Kabul Station, were among those injured. The deputy chief was in grave condition and was taken to Landstuhl Regional Medical Center, a U.S. military hospital in Germany.

Captain Sharif Ali bin Zeid, 34, a Jordanian intelligence officer, was killed in the attack. He was the Jordanian handler of al-Balawi and the liaison between him and the CIA. Bin Zeid was a cousin to King Abdullah II of Jordan. Bin Zeid's wake was held in the Royal Palace. King Abdullah II and Queen Rania attended his funeral. Official Jordanian news reports said that he died while performing humanitarian service in Afghanistan. His death shed light on the U.S.-Jordanian intelligence partnership, which is rarely acknowledged publicly, yet seen by U.S. officials as highly important for their counter-terrorism strategy.

Arghawan, 30, the base's Afghan external security chief, had picked up al-Balawi at the Pakistan border and drove him to Camp Chapman. He was also killed in the attack.

=== Responsibility ===
==== Al-Qaeda ====
Al-Qaeda claimed responsibility for the attack. Mustafa Abu al-Yazid, the al-Qaeda leader in Afghanistan, stated that the attack was intended to avenge the deaths of three al-Qaeda and Taliban leaders who were killed in U.S. drone attacks. "He avenged our prime martyrs, and as he wrote in his final testament, may God have mercy on him: Taking revenge for the leader the Amir Beitullah Mehsud and the leaders Abu Saleh al-Somali and Abdallah Said al-Libi and their brothers, may God have mercy on them," al-Yazid wrote. Baitullah Mehsud was the former head of the Pakistani Taliban, Saleh al-Somali was in charge of al-Qaeda operations outside of Pakistan and Afghanistan, and Said al-Libi was a senior Libyan member of the group, and the leader of al-Qaeda's military organization in the region, the Lashkar al-Zil.

==== Pakistani Taliban ====
Tehrik-i-Taliban Pakistan also claimed responsibility for the attack and said that they used a turncoat CIA informant to carry it out. Pakistani Taliban chief Hakimullah Mehsud claimed responsibility for the attack, and stated that the attack would avenge the killings of Taliban leader Baitullah Mehsud in a U.S. drone strike in August 2009 and of "al Qaeda's Abdullah." He stated, "the suicide bomber was a Jordanian national. This will be admitted by the CIA and the Jordanian government."

On January 9, 2010, the Pakistani television network AAJ TV showed a video that had been released by the Tehrik-i-Taliban. The video showed al-Balawi, sitting beside Hakimullah Mehsud, vowing to avenge the death of the Pakistan Taliban leadership: "We will never forget the blood of our emir, Baitullah Mehsud. We will always demand revenge for him inside America and outside." Hakimullah Mehsud replaced his cousin Baitullah Mehsud as the chief of the Tehrik-i-Taliban after Baitullah was killed by a U.S. drone attack. Al-Balawi's father confirmed that the video showed his son.

Analysts said that, in return for organizational support, al-Balawi probably agreed to appear in the video, and to connect the attack he was planning to the death of Baitullah Mehsud, thus raising the profile of the Tehrik-i-Taliban. Most analysts believe, however, that al Qaeda chose the CIA as the target and ran the operation.

==== Afghan Taliban ====
Afghan Taliban spokesman Zabiullah Mujahid said that the attack was carried out by a Taliban sympathizer in the Afghan National Army. Mujahid said that the "well dressed" official would have been of sufficiently high rank to walk past security at the base. However, this claim was proven false.

== Background ==
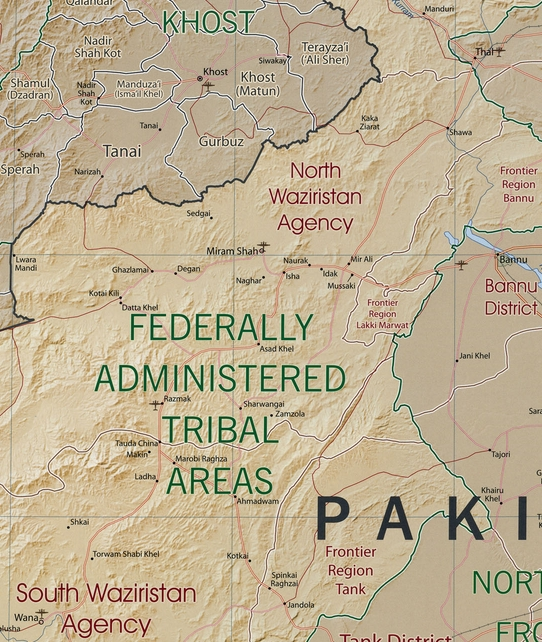
Khost Province, Afghanistan and North and South Waziristan tribal areas, Pakistan. Camp Chapman is located at the airplane symbol southeast of the city of Khost. Straight-line distance from Khost to Miranshah is less than 25 miles.

The attack took place as the CIA expanded its role in the Afghanistan War, increasing paramilitary operations, including drone attacks in Pakistan. To accomplish this, the CIA had built a number of bases in the southern and eastern provinces of Afghanistan.

The drone attacks carried out by the CIA in Pakistan rely on local informants, who can cross the border into Pakistan in a way CIA officers cannot. CIA officers at the base were involved in the coordination, targeting and surveillance of drone strikes aimed at the Afghan Taliban, the Haqqani network, the Pakistani Taliban and al-Qaeda. At the time of the attack, they were conducting an aggressive campaign against the Haqqani network, a radical group run by Jalaluddin Haqqani and his son, Sirajuddin Haqqani.

The attack came at a time when disputes over civilian casualties between the U.S. and Pakistan, and over counter-terrorism strategies between the U.S. and Pakistan, were increasing. Pakistan's security officials had warned against an escalation of the U.S. drone attacks in the country. A senior Pakistani security official urged the United States to coordinate its response to the suicide attack with the Pakistani government, in order to avoid "unnecessary and further friction" to the alliance of both countries, while a U.S. State Department official said that the U.S. counter-terrorism efforts "are coordinated with foreign governments, including with Pakistan, as needed."

=== Forward Operating Base Chapman ===
Forward Operating Base Chapman is located at the site of a former Afghan army installation with an airstrip. The base is named for Sergeant First Class Nathan Chapman, the first U.S. soldier killed by enemy fire during the Afghanistan war. Chapman was killed while fighting alongside the CIA in 2002. FOB Chapman is located near Forward Operating Base Salerno, a military base used by U.S. special operations forces.

The CIA's base at Camp Chapman was set up at the beginning of the U.S.-led offensive against al-Qaeda and the Afghan Taliban in 2001. It began as an improvised center for operations. A military base at the beginning, it was later transformed into a CIA base. Camp Chapman was also used as a base for the Khost Provincial Reconstruction Team, a military-led development group. In recent years, the base evolved into a major counter-terrorism hub of the CIA's paramilitary Special Activities Division, used for joint operation with U.S. special operations forces and Afghan allies. It also had a housing compound for U.S. intelligence officers.

== U.S. reaction ==
=== Drone attacks in North Waziristan ===
The United States responded to the attack by increasing its drone attacks against militants in Pakistan. Nearly every day after the CIA facility was attacked, the U.S. military conducted drone strikes aimed at leaders of the Haqqani network in North Waziristan. In the week after the attack, the U.S. military conducted five drone strikes, an unusually high number. However, U.S. counter-terrorism officials cautioned against linking these attacks to the bombing. After reports of drone strikes, Pakistan said it would not support the attacks in its territory, as they were counterproductive.

In March 2010, the death of Hussein al-Yemeni in a drone strike was announced. Al-Yemeni was called a planner involved in the suicide bomb attack.

On November 1, 2013, the CIA killed Hakimullah Mehsud in a drone strike in Danday Darpa Khel.

=== Investigations and security measures ===
U.S. officials said that the CIA conducted a review of intelligence supplied by al-Balawi, examining whether he supplied false information about U.S. successes amid valid data used to establish his credibility. The investigation included a review of a list of senior al Qaeda and Taliban operatives reported killed in U.S. drone strikes since January 2009. The National Counterterrorism Center conducted its own review of the intelligence al-Balawi provided, two officials said.

Following the attack, the U.S. issued new security guidance to its bases in Afghanistan, according to U.S. military officials. One U.S. military official said the guidance would adjust procedures as quickly as possible on a large scale.

== Political reactions and commentary ==
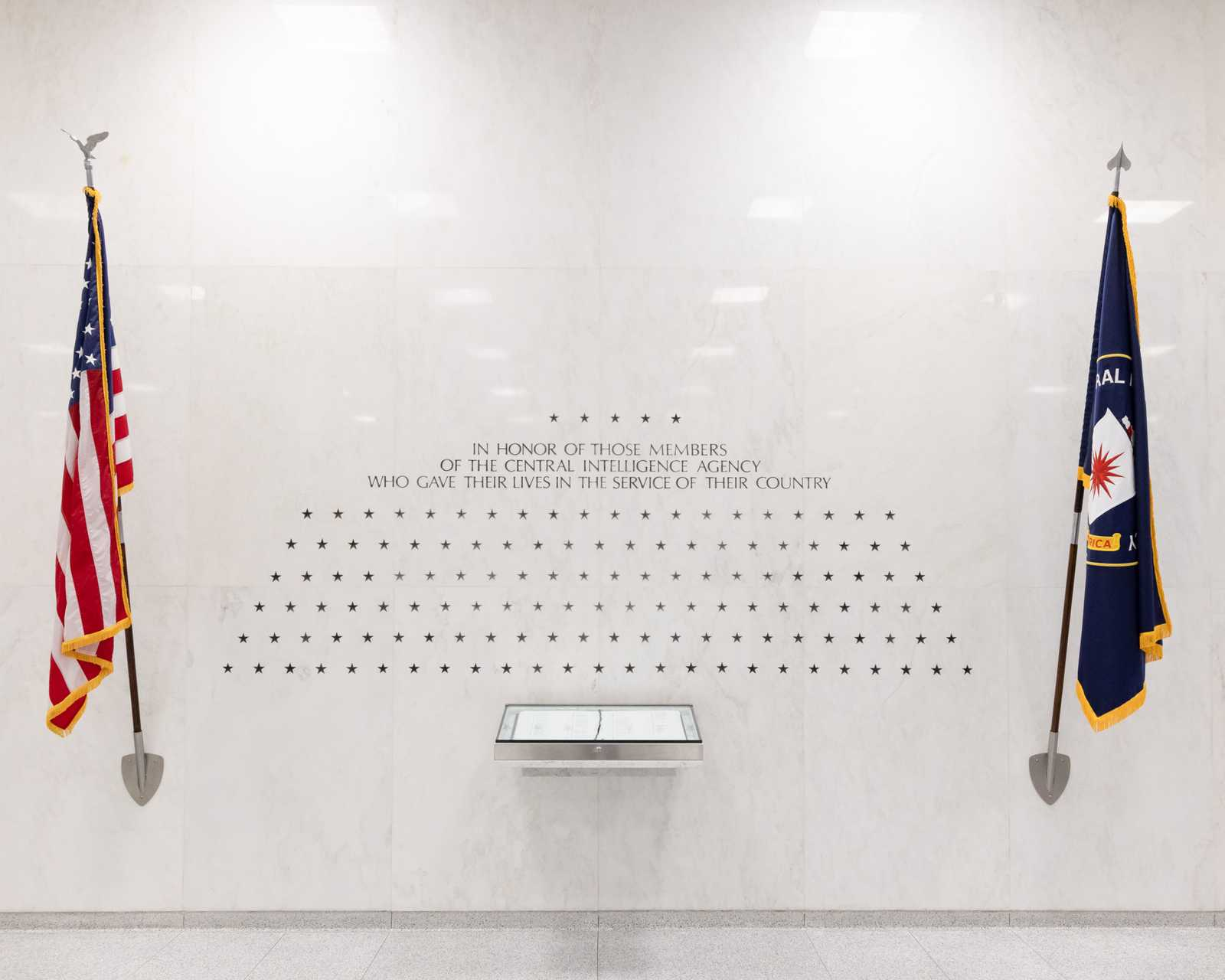
The CIA Memorial Wall as of 2023. Seven stars represent the CIA members who died in the attack.

U.S. President Barack Obama praised the CIA officers who died in the bombing, and Afghan President Hamid Karzai condemned the attack. All seven of the operatives killed in the attack were memorialized with a star on the agency's Memorial Wall at its headquarters.

=== United States ===
President Barack Obama wrote in a letter to CIA employees: "In recent years, the CIA has been tested as never before. Since our country was attacked on September 11, 2001, you have served on the frontlines in directly confronting the dangers of the 21st century. Because of your service, plots have been disrupted, American lives have been saved, and our Allies and partners have been more secure. Your triumphs and even your names may be unknown to your fellow Americans, but your service is deeply appreciated."

The leaders of the House and Senate intelligence committees issued statements of condolence.

Flags at CIA headquarters in Langley, Virginia, flew at half-staff. In a message to CIA employees, CIA Director Leon Panetta said: "Those who fell yesterday were far from home and close to the enemy, doing the hard work that must be done to protect our country from terrorism. We owe them our deepest gratitude." In an article published by the Washington Post, Panetta strongly defended the CIA officers against criticism, and disputed that relaxed security measures or blind trust in the informant enabled the attacker to succeed.

=== Islamist militants ===
The attack was praised by Islamist militants after it became known that al-Balawi was the author, under the pen name Abu Dujana, of some of the anti-Western commentaries that they admired. One militant wrote, referring to al-Balawi's pseudonym: "Our James Bond, who is he? / He is Abu Dujana! / His motto: Let me die or live free! / Our James Bond, what did he seek? / Not power or money, / But justice for the weak."

=== Jordan ===
Jordanian intelligence officials were embarrassed by the incident due to the fact that they had vouched for al-Balawi. Jordan's government was embarrassed as well, as it did not want the extent of its cooperation with the CIA to be known. Jordan's General Intelligence Department (GID), known as the Mukhabarat, works very closely with the CIA. At the same time, the U.S., and the CIA in particular, are viewed very negatively by the people in Jordan, about half of which have Palestinian origins, as al-Balawi did.

Jordan's Prime Minister Samir Rifai defended the country's overseas deployment in support of the United States' war on terror, but the Islamist-led opposition called on the government to stop working with the CIA. King Abdullah II, Queen Rania, and Crown Prince Hussein attended GID Captain Sharif Ali bin Zeid's funeral, as he was a cousin of the King. Official media only reported that bin Zeid was killed on a "humanitarian mission" in Afghanistan, with no mention of the CIA cooperation.

Several media analysts were called by Jordanian officials and told not to make inflammatory statements. At least one local journalist working with the foreign media was detained and questioned.

=== Expert and media commentary ===
==== Impact ====
In the old days when we were running Russian operations, if you had a double agent the worst that happened was he feeds you false information. These days if you have a double agent he detonates in your face.

— Gary Berntsen, former CIA officer

Several former intelligence officials described the attack as emotionally distressing for the spy agency. Former CIA deputy director John E. McLaughlin said: "It is the nightmare we've been anticipating since we went into Afghanistan and Iraq." Bruce Hoffman, a professor at Georgetown University's School of Foreign Service, characterized the assault as a serious reversal in NATO's war efforts. Former CIA Counterterrorism Chief Robert Grenier described the attack as the Taliban equivalent of a precision guided weapon. "This attack is something that will never be forgotten in Langley, Virginia," said Jack Rice, who formerly worked as a CIA officer in Afghanistan.

Henry A. Crumpton, a former Coordinator for Counterterrorism who directed the CIA operations in Afghanistan in 2001 and 2002, said that the CIA employees were "experienced frontline officers and their knowledge and expertise will be sorely missed." A NATO official in Afghanistan underscored the significance of the attack, and noted that it had shut down a key station of the CIA in Afghanistan. "These were not people who wrote things down in the computer or in notebooks. It was all in their heads," he said, adding that much of the knowledge would not be recoverable. Several current and former intelligence officials, however, said that the CIA had numerous operatives with experience in Afghanistan, as the country was considered strategic during the Cold War, and because the U.S. has been involved in active warfare there for the last eight years.

==== Security procedures ====
A U.S. intelligence official said the danger of using informants was inherent but unavoidable. Intelligence agencies have to rely on unsavory individuals to penetrate terrorist groups because no one else has the access. Those hazards would be neither denied nor ignored by the CIA officers. Former intelligence officials said they were deeply troubled about al-Balawi's ability to get close to so many CIA officers. A former agency case officer expressed surprise that "a potential hostile" was able to be in immediate proximity to a large number of CIA operatives. "Why the officers would show a source all their faces, that alone was a terrible decision," said one former senior CIA paramilitary operative who served in Afghanistan. Larry C. Johnson, a former CIA officer and counter-terrorism agent, said that a source supposedly as significant as al-Balawi should never have been brought inside the base, because it risked exposing him.

I have never heard of anything as unprofessional. There's an old infantry rule: Don't bunch up.

— A former CIA case officer

Robert Baer, a former CIA officer, said that the agency would be outsourcing intelligence and would have to go to the Jordanians "because we simply cannot, as blond haired blue eyed Americans, cannot get into these camps." He said the attack would make the CIA more reluctant to engage with informants. He added that the attack would have been a huge setback for the CIA's intelligence collection in Afghanistan. "You're talking about an institutional nightmare," said Tim Weiner, author of the book Legacy of Ashes: The History of the CIA. Former 9/11 Commission chairman Lee H. Hamilton predicted that the attack would forever change how the CIA handles informants. "They will never forget this lesson," he said.

==== Media reports and commentary ====
Media reports said the attack struck at the heart of American covert operations in the region, with some characterizing it as the CIA's Pearl Harbor. It raised doubts about the reliability of the Afghan forces that are being trained by the United States and its allies, and on the practicality of Western exit strategies that involve training the Afghan army and policy with the aim of enabling them to fight the Taliban on their own.

David Ignatius, a columnist for the Washington Post and the author of the book Body of Lies, opined that the CIA had become careless out of desperation. According to Ignatius, it would be obvious that the CIA would have been so eager to acquire knowledge about the location of Osama bin Laden that it would take every available opportunity to get information. Shoshana Bryen, a U.S. security expert, said that the bombing would make Israel and the U.S. wary in their future dealings with Jordan.

William Saletan noted the mischaracterization of the attack as "an act of terrorism" in many media reports. As terrorism targets civilians, and the CIA employees were conducting a war, he states that the bombing was clearly "an act of war. It was also espionage. But it wasn't terrorism."

== In popular culture ==
The Camp Chapman attack was dramatized in the 2012 film Zero Dark Thirty. The "Jessica" character, modeled on Jennifer Lynne Matthews, is killed in the attack. Several people who knew Matthews complained that the portrayal was not very accurate.

== See also ==
- CIA activities in Afghanistan
- Drone attacks in Pakistan
- Coalition casualties in Afghanistan
- Forward Operating Base Chapman
- Nathan Chapman
