= Jennifer Matthews =

American counterterrorism officer (1964–2009)

Jennifer Lynne Matthews (December 6, 1964 – December 30, 2009) was an American Central Intelligence Agency (CIA) officer. She was killed in the Camp Chapman attack in Khost, Afghanistan, a suicide bombing that targeted CIA personnel. Matthews was known for her work in counterterrorism.

== Early life and education ==
Matthews was born on December 6, 1964, in Penbrook, Pennsylvania. She was the middle child in a family where her mother worked as a nurse, and her father was a commercial printer. Matthews attended Central Dauphin East High School in Harrisburg, Pennsylvania, where she was a member of the National Honor Society and Youth for Christ. In 1982, she graduated from high school, where her classmates voted her "most likely to be the next Barbara Walters." Matthews attended Cedarville University in Ohio, where she earned a degree in political science. She later pursued a career in intelligence and joined the Central Intelligence Agency (CIA) in 1989.

== Career at the CIA ==
Matthews began her career at the CIA as an analyst, spending her first seven years in this role. In the mid-1990s, she transitioned to the CIA's Counterterrorism Center, focusing on tracking al-Qaeda. Matthews was tracking al-Qaeda before the September 11 attacks. She joined the CIA in 1989 and was involved with the agency's Bin Laden Issue Station. A U.S. official said Matthews was "one of the US government's top experts on al-Qaeda and other terrorist groups." She played a key role in several high-profile operations, including the capture of Abu Zubaydah, the first high-value al-Qaeda target apprehended after 9/11. Matthews was involved in his interrogation and was a key figure in the CIA's rendition operations. From 2005 to 2009, Matthews served as the chief of the Counterterrorism Branch in London, overseeing operations in the United Kingdom. One of her notable achievements during this time was her involvement in thwarting a 2006 al-Qaeda plot to bomb U.S.-bound jets.

=== Camp Chapman Attack ===
In September 2009, Matthews volunteered to be CIA chief at Forward Operating Base Chapman, located near the Afghanistan-Pakistan border in Khost, Afghanistan. This deployment marked her first long-term stint in a war zone. At Khost, Matthews and her team were working with a Jordanian informant, Humam Khalil Abu Mulal al-Balawi, who claimed to have detailed intelligence on al-Qaeda leaders, including Osama bin Laden and Ayman al-Zawahiri. However, al-Balawi was a double agent working for al-Qaeda. On December 30, 2009, he detonated a suicide bomb inside the base, killing Matthews and six other CIA personnel. This incident was the deadliest attack on the CIA since the beginning of the war on terror.

Matthews is buried in Arlington National Cemetery. A star was carved into the CIA Memorial Wall to honor Matthews.

=== Legacy and impact ===
Jennifer Matthews’ death brought attention to the risks associated with intelligence operations in conflict zones. The Camp Chapman attack prompted internal reviews and changes within the CIA regarding informant handling and base security. Her family was reportedly divided in the aftermath of her death, reflecting differing views on her work and the circumstances surrounding the attack. Matthews was survived by her husband and three children. Her daughter has been outspoken about her work and legacy, and involved in the CIA Officers Memorial Foundation.

Matthews was portrayed as the character Jessica in Zero Dark Thirty. The film depicted her as making critical errors, leading to her death in the Camp Chapman attack in Afghanistan. However, this portrayal has been criticized by those who knew her, including former Cedarville professors and CIA veteran Jose A. Rodriguez Jr., who argued it misrepresented her seriousness and expertise. Rodriguez said Matthews was a dedicated and talented officer, playing a key role in significant operations. Her life and work is chronicled in Joby Warrick's book The Triple Agent.
