= Nathan Chapman (soldier) =

United States Army soldier (1970–2002)

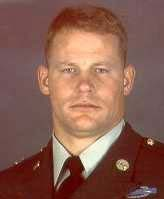
- Born: Nathan Ross Chapman; April 23, 1970; Andrews Air Force Base, Maryland, U.S.
- Died: January 4, 2002 (aged 31); Gardez, Afghanistan †
- Burial place: Tahoma National Cemetery, Kent, Washington
- Military career
- Allegiance: United States of America
- Branch: United States Army
- Service years: 1988–2002
- Rank: Sergeant First Class
- Unit: 1st Special Forces Group
- Conflicts: Operation Just Cause; Gulf War; Operation Uphold Democracy; War in Afghanistan
- Awards: Bronze Star; Purple Heart

Nathan Ross Chapman (April 23, 1970 – January 4, 2002) was a United States Army Sergeant First Class with the 1st Special Forces Group. He was the first American soldier to be killed by enemy action in the War in Afghanistan.

== Early life and education ==
The son of Wilbur and Lynn Chapman, Chapman was born at Andrews Air Force Base, where his father was stationed at the time. Chapman grew up in a variety of towns across the United States, and graduated from Centerville High School, near Dayton, Ohio. He listed his hometown as San Antonio, Texas when he joined the military at the age of 18. He had never lived in San Antonio, but that is where his grandparents lived.

== Career ==
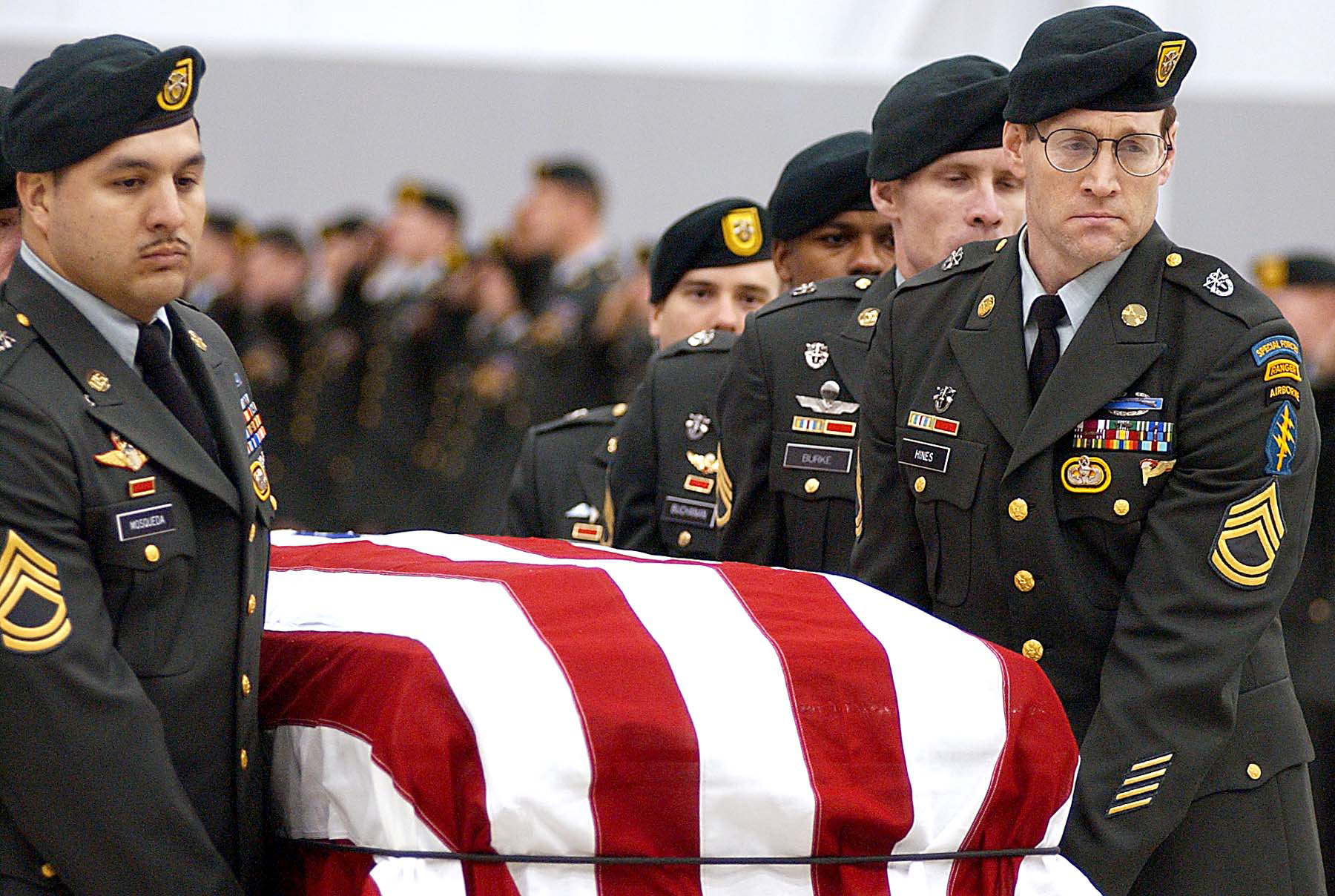
Chapman's coffin being carried by military pallbearers in January 2002

Chapman's military career spanned 13 years and included combat service in Haiti, Panama, and the Persian Gulf War. In 1989, he parachuted into Panama as part of the invasion during Operation Just Cause. He also served in Operation Desert Storm and later completed selection for the Army Special Forces at Fort Bragg, North Carolina.

Assigned to the 1st Special Forces Group following the 11 September attacks, Chapman was directing troop movements from the back of a flatbed truck when he was shot. He did not die instantly from the attack, which also saw a CIA Paramilitary Operations Officer from Special Activities Division wounded. Although originally dubbed an "ambush", the military backed away from using the term.

He was posthumously awarded the Purple Heart and the Bronze Star. Forward Operating Base Chapman was named after SFC Chapman.

On May 18, 2015, the CIA acknowledged Chapman had been detailed to a six-man CIA unit known as "Team Hotel" and unveiled a star on their memorial wall in his honor.

== Awards and decorations ==
SFC Chapman was awarded the following during his military career:

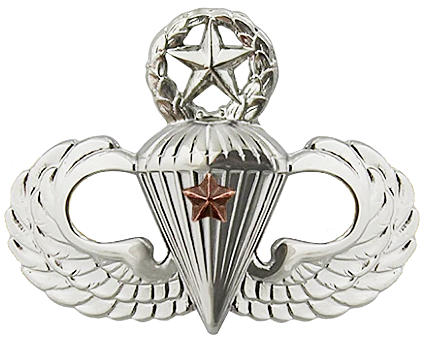

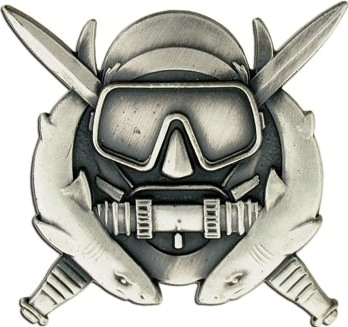

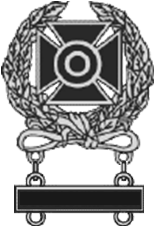

Badge	Combat Infantryman Badge with star (denoting second award)		
1st row	Bronze Star with "V" device		
2nd row	Purple Heart	Meritorious Service Medal	Army Commendation Medal with 1 Oak leaf cluster (2 awards)
3rd row	Army Achievement Medal with 3 Oak leaf clusters (4 awards)	Army Good Conduct Medal with 3 Good conduct loops	National Defense Service Medal with 1 Service star
4th row	Armed Forces Expeditionary Medal with Arrowhead device	Southwest Asia Service Medal with 1 Campaign star	Afghanistan Campaign Medal
5th row	Armed Forces Service Medal	Humanitarian Service Medal	Non-Commissioned Officer Professional Development Ribbon with Award numeral 3
6th row	Army Service Ribbon	Army Overseas Ribbon	United Nations Medal
7th row	NATO Medal for ex-Yugoslavia	Kuwait Liberation Medal (Saudi Arabia)	Kuwait Liberation Medal (Kuwait)
Badges	Master Parachutist Badge with 1 bronze combat jump star	Special Operations Diver Badge	Expert Marksmanship badge with rifle component bar
Tabs	Special Forces Tab		Ranger Tab

Other accoutrements
Expert Infantryman Badge
1st Special Forces Command (Airborne) Combat Service Identification Badge
United States Army Special Forces Distinctive unit insignia
Royal Thai Parachutist Badge

== Personal life ==
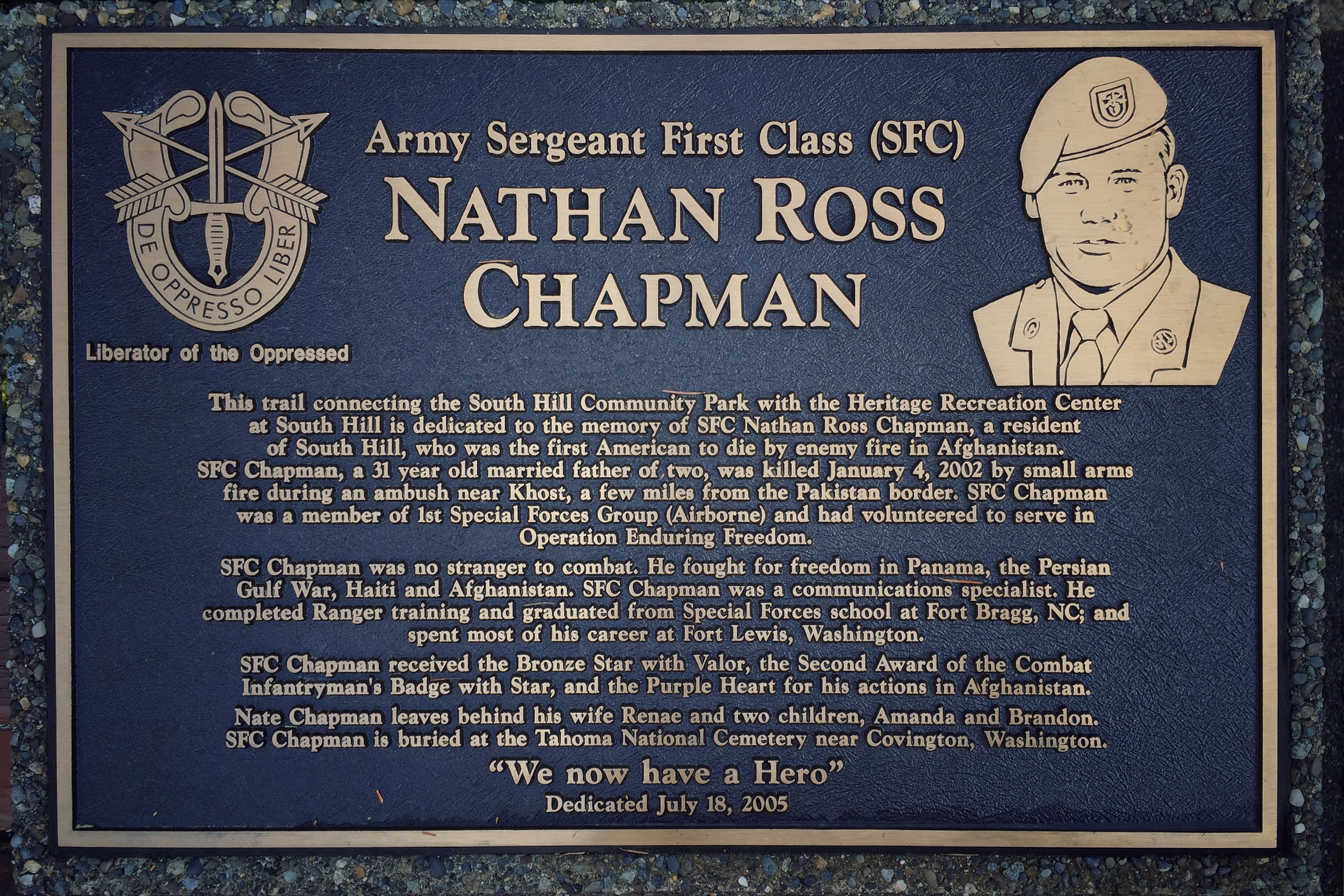
Plaque adorning the memorial trail

Chapman, his wife Renae and two children lived in Puyallup, Washington. He was buried at the Tahoma National Cemetery in Kent, Washington.

There is a Nathan Chapman Memorial Trail in Pierce County, Washington.

On September 11, 2006, a casting commemorating Chapman was displayed "in Georgetown, Texas".

== See also ==
- Forward Operating Base Chapman attack
- United States military casualties in the War in Afghanistan
