= Forward Operating Base Salerno =

Military installation in Afghanistan

FOB Salerno
- جمهوری
- Khost (Matun) District, Khost Province in Afghanistan
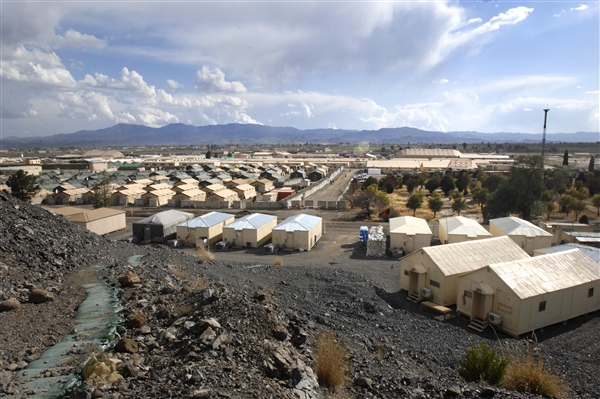
- FOB Salerno (2008)

Site information
- Type: Forward Operating Base
- Owner: Ministry of Defense
- Operator: Afghan Armed Forces

Location
- Location of FOB Salerno
- Location within Afghanistan
- Coordinates: 33.364°N 69.957°E

Site history
- Built: October 2002
- Built by: Assault and Barrier Platoon/618th HHC, 307th Engineer Battalion as part of 3rd BN, 505th PIR, 82nd ABN DIV
- In use: 2002–2013
- Battles/wars: Operation Enduring Freedom

Airfield information
- Identifiers: IATA: OLR, ICAO: OASL

Forward Operating Base Salerno (IATA: OLR, ICAO: OASL) is a former Forward Operating Base used by the United States Army from 2002 to 2013 during Operation Enduring Freedom. It is located in the southeastern province of Khost, Afghanistan, near the city of Khost. On 1 November 2013, U.S. forces withdrew from FOB Salerno and transferred control of the installation to the Afghan National Army.

== Base overview ==
Originally named Camp Stormy, The facility was built by members of the Assault and Barrier Platoon, HHC, 307th Engineer Battalion, 82nd Airborne Division and 618th Engineer company, respectively. These Combat Engineers were part of Task Force Panther, centered around the 3rd Battalion, 505th Parachute Infantry Regiment from Fort Bragg, North Carolina. It was later named for the beachhead in Salerno, Italy that the 505th PIR parachuted onto on 14 September 1943 (Operation Avalanche).

The base is geographically isolated from the rest of Afghanistan being connected to the rest of the country through the Khost-Gardez Pass. The pass serves as a natural choke point to the region and has been the scene of many battles throughout the US war in Afghanistan as well as the Soviet war in Afghanistan. The base is in a hostile location and is only 30 miles south of Tora Bora, it is also only 25 miles north of the location of the friendly fire incident that killed Pat Tillman.

Construction began in early October 2002, where the Engineers and members of the 82nd Forward Support Battalion were inserted via CH-47s prior to the Infantry, responsible for their own security and life support. After acquiring a lone D-8 Bulldozer provided by local Afghan forces, construction began on the initial footprint. This consisted of a living area, helicopter landing pad, forward arming and refueling point (FARP) and a 3,000-foot dirt runway, which was used for the first time in November 2002 by a C-130. Over the years, the base grew to house a population of nearly 5,000 service personnel, civilians, and contractors. Salerno grew to the size of a small city and included a combat support hospital, large gymnasium, post exchange, chapel, large dining hall, aviation hangars, maintenance facilities, billets, the runway and FARP, and sub-camps for U.S. Special Operations Command units.

In November 2009, a portion of FOB Salerno, where U.S. Army Special Forces worked and lived with an Afghan Commando unit, was renamed Camp Pucino after SSG Matthew Pucino died that month. SSG Pucino was a member of ODA 2223.

Soldiers with 2nd Battalion, 506th Infantry Regiment, 4th BCT, 101st Airborne Division, popularly known as Fox Company, were the last U.S. personnel to occupy FOB Salerno. They left on 31 October 2013 after transferring the base to the 203rd Corps, Afghan National Army. During its operations two Sapper platoons specializing in route clearance operations were stationed at Salerno. Most of the route clearance units were drawn from the Army National Guard serving on active duty. They were responsible for neutralizing Improvised Explosive Device threats as well as escorting convoys through the heavily mined area. The route clearance units at FOB Salerno were also responsible for routinely clearing the Khost-Gardez Pass. Route clearance is a slow operation as units make slow progress to neutralize mines along the route, since the K-G Pass is relatively long and susceptible to attack the mission routinely took several days to complete.

== U.S. commands ==
- Task Force Geronimo – 501st Parachute Infantry Regiment, 1–501st PIR (October 2003 – August 2004)
- Task Force Devil – 1st Brigade, 82nd Airborne Division (January 2003 – July 2003)
- Task Force Thunder – 25th Infantry Division Artillery, (~March 2004 – March 2005)
- Task Force Devil – 1st Brigade, 82nd Airborne Division (March 2005 – March 2006)
- Task Force Spartan – 3rd Brigade Combat Team, 10th Mountain Division (March 2006 – March 2007)
- Task Force Fury – 508th Parachute Infantry Regiment, 4th Brigade Combat Team, 82nd Airborne Division (2007 – March 2008)
- Task Force Currahee – 506th Infantry Regiment, 4th Brigade Combat Team, 101st Airborne Division (March 2008 – February 2009)
- Task Force Yukon – 4th Brigade Combat Team, 25th Infantry Division (March 2009 – March 2010)
- Task Force Rakkasans – 187th Infantry Regiment, 3rd Brigade Combat Team, 101st Airborne Division (February 2010 – January 2011)
- Task Force Duke – 3rd Brigade Combat Team, 1st Infantry Division (January 2011 – January 2012)
- Task Force Spartan – 4th Airborne Brigade Combat Team, 25th Infantry Division
- Task Force Rakkasans – 187th Infantry Regiment, 3rd Brigade Combat Team, 101st Airborne Division (August 2012 – April 2013)
- Task Force Currahee – 506th Infantry Regiment, 4th Brigade Combat Team, 101st Airborne Division (April 2013 – November 2013)
- Special Operations Task Force 202 (Advanced Operations Base 2220)

== Incidents ==
=== 19 August 2008 attack ===
On 19 August 2008 insurgents attempted to assault FOB Salerno with a double car bomb. The bombs detonated close to the base perimeter and killed 15 Afghans, though estimates from those at the base at the time list this closer to 50. Throughout the day small arms fire and rockets landed on the base and around midnight the next day the base came under heavy mortar fire and was attacked by about 30 Taliban insurgents, though initial estimates listed this closer to 100 Taliban. Several of the initial 30 insurgents were of Saudi descent and trained to operate Apache Helicopters. The attackers attempted to breach the base near the airfield in an attempt to steal Apache gunships as per intelligence reports at the time, where there is no HESCO bastion. Nearly all of the attackers carried suicide vests, three of which detonated their vest early as they came under machine gun fire from the base's towers. Afghan commandos and US Special Forces are credited with surrounding the other suicide bombers before they had a chance to attack though several of the insurgents also detonated injuring Afghan Commandos. Another group of Taliban was observed preparing for an attack 1000 meters from the base before coalition forces opened up small arms fire though rocket fire from the Pakistan border carried through throughout the rest of the evening and the rest of the following day. Helicopter gunships, A10 warthogs and Reaper Drones later pounded the Taliban staging area and surrounding rocket sites, resulting in 3 known deaths. After the attack the insurgents were found in possession of anti-personnel Type 69 RPGs. As anti-personnel RPGs are rare in Afghanistan it is unclear how the weapons were obtained, though there is a connection with Northwestern Chinese units selling their munitions to the Taliban for profit and could be the origin of the AP RPG-69's.

=== 2009 regional volatility ===
FOB Salerno continued to receive a large amount or mortar and rocket fire through the summer of 2009. In one incident, a rocket detonated over the Base Defense Operations Center and a number of personnel was struck by shrapnel, but there were no significant injuries. Months later, another rocket landed near a vehicle checkpoint occupied by Task Force Yukon (4th Brigade Combat Team, 25th Infantry Division) security personnel, which led to armed Kiowas being scrambled to search for enemy combatants in the area.

On 13 May 2009 there was a green on blue attack when AAF detonated a VBIED in the FOB Salerno Local National parking lot just outside of FOB Salerno facilities killing and wounding FOB Salerno Local National workers and families attempting to use medical resources on the installation. US forces and local nationals working with U.S. and Coalition Forces supporting everyday operations were targeted.

On 30 December 2009 FOB Chapman, another nearby installation was attacked by a suicide bomber who was involved with the CIA as an undercover agent infiltrating Al Qaeda. The double agent was not properly searched by base security as he was allowed into the base and detonated his explosives while meeting with the CIA Station Chief and other personnel. Seven CIA operatives were killed, making this attack the deadliest for the agency since the 1983 United States embassy bombing.

=== August 2010 attack ===
FOB Salerno was once again attacked by a group of Taliban on 28 August 2010. The attack started around 0400 with small arms and mortar fire. In addition, suicide bombers participated in the attack. As the attack commenced, some of the insurgents were able to penetrate inside the base and attempted to detonate themselves, but were stopped by coalition forces. Afghan forces also detained five insurgents and destroyed a recoil-less rifle at the scene. After the failed assault, NATO forces conducted an airstrike on a car occupied by 4 Haqqani Network fighters in the area.

=== June 2012 attack ===
There was a complex attack against the FOB in early June 2012. Insurgents utilized a local truck packed with 1,500–2,000 pounds of explosives; a suicide bomber detonated his truck bomb on the southern edge of the base, breaching the perimeter and causing significant damage to the base's buildings. The dining hall annex was leveled and the main DFAC (Dining Facility) sustained severe roof damage in the blast. Moments later, ten insurgents entered the breach armed with rifles, machine guns, grenades, and rockets; each bomber wore ACU digital military camouflage uniforms while one wore an ANA military uniform and most wore explosive suicide vests. The attackers were first engaged by two Navy SEALs driving by the DFAC in a Toyota truck, and then by a five-man team consisting of three helicopter mechanics and two vehicle mechanics; who blocked the attackers advance from two directions. After a 7-minute firefight, US service members repelled the attack, killing all ten insurgents. With the last insurgent dressed in an ANA uniform being killed in a ditch. The first insurgent to fire shot a RPG rocket into the front of a Toyota truck hitting the front right bumper but did not explode. Then a Navy SEAL riding in the truck rolled down his window and shot the insurgent. Next two insurgents came around the second wall and were shot by two helicopter mechanics. Two base contractors were killed in the attack when the DFAC annex collapsed, and a US Soldier died of a fragmentation wound to his face from a hand grenade a few days later. Although initially downplayed in the media, in July 2012 both Long War Journal and al Jazeera published an unedited attack video released by the Taliban. Taliban spokesman Zabiullah Mujahid claimed that an airplane on an airstrip at the base was destroyed and that 'tens' of foreign forces were killed and wounded in the attack. The Taliban later released the video of the attack, showing the attackers practicing in Southeast Afghanistan, taking their photos, the group leader showing his shooting skills by shooting two machine guns and the suicide bomber in the truck.

== Troop drawdown ==
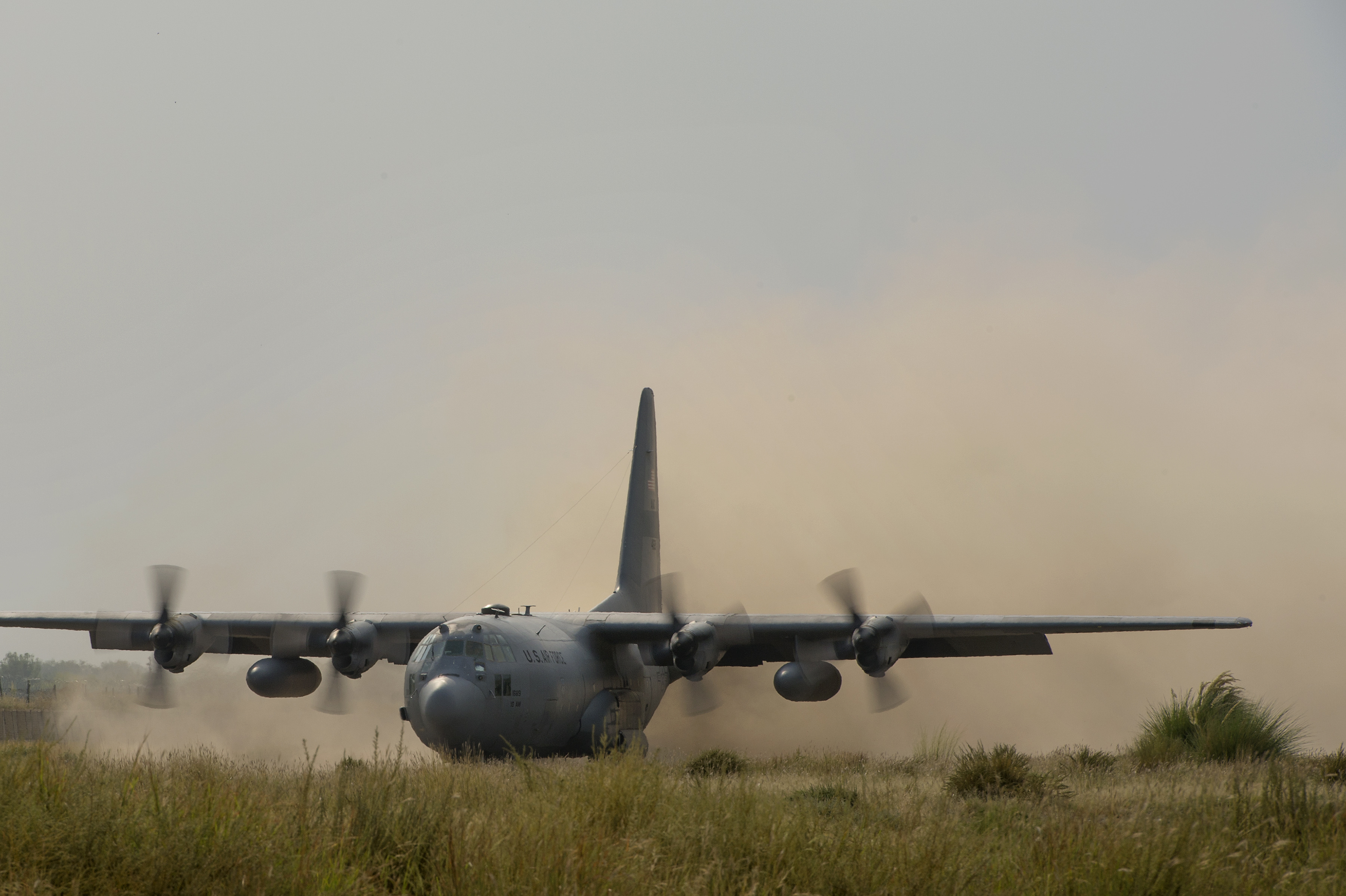
A C-130 landing as part of the drawdown

FOB Salerno was located approximately 25 km from the Pakistan border and the most viable path connecting it to Afghanistan was the Khost-Gardez Pass, which is highly vulnerable to attack and often lead to supply shortages at the base. In fact this path was the scene of Operation Magistral, the last large scale Soviet operation in Afghanistan. During the operation the Battle for Hill 3234 took place in which the 9th Company of the 345th Independent Guards Airborne Regiment was almost wiped out but managed to hold back the mujaheddin attack. During this battle the 39 soldiers of the 9th company held back 200–500 fighters, after the battle only 5 active soldiers remained as all others were either wounded or KIA. FOB Chapman was built around the original Soviet airfield servicing Khost while FOB Salerno was built slightly north of this facility, together these two bases were the vanguards of the city of Khost since they were only several miles from the city, often sending forces to respond to attacks in the provincial capital. The Battle of Tora Bora took place approximately 30 miles north of Khost. Because of this geographic isolation FOB Salerno, being isolated from the rest of Afghanistan on one side and having the Federally Administered Tribal Areas of Pakistan on the other, the area remained vulnerable to insurgent attacks, supplies often had to be airlifted into the base when the path to Gardez was impassible adding to shortage and cost issues. The base remained a blackout FOB for its existence due to constant mortar and rocket fire, however losses were usually minimal as the indirect fire rarely hit the base. Insurgent activity remained a constant threat as the close proximity to Pakistan provided for easy mobility of the hostiles. Due to its rural location the base was selected for closure in 2013 as ISAF forces prepare to draw down their presence in the country. On 1 November 2013 the Afghan Government fully took control of the base while before they operated in their own separate section as the last remaining US forces withdrew from FOB Salerno led by Soldiers from 2nd Battalion, 506th Infantry Regiment. Constructed in 2002 the base hosted US and ISAF troops for over a decade. During the closure the Inspector General for Afghan Reconstruction noted that the inadequate planning of the command staff on the base resulted in $5 million being spent on an incinerator. The incinerator was to replace the open burn pit on base which was thought to cause potential health problems, however once built it was never used and allowed to rust away. The base command continued open burn pit operations while being aware of the health hazard of an open burn pit, even though an incinerator was built and ready to use.

== See also ==
- Khost-Gardez Pass
- List of ISAF installations in Afghanistan
