= Charlotte Belle Emerson Keith =

- Born: Charlotte Belle Emerson; January 22, 1865; Rockford, Illinois, US
- Died: May 29, 1950 (aged 85); Rockford, Illinois, US
- Known for: Painting, Educator
- Spouse: Darwin Keith (m. 1898)

Charlotte Belle Emerson Keith (1865–1950) was an American painter and the founder of the Keith Country Day School in Rockford, Illinois.

== Biography ==
Keith née Emerson was born on January 22, 1865, in Rockford, Illinois. In 1895 she graduated from the School of Art at Wellesley College. In 1888 she traveled to Europe where she studied with Carl von Marr in Munich, Germany, and Charles Lasar in Paris, France.

Keith exhibited her work at the Illinois State Building at the 1893 World's Columbian Exposition in Chicago, Illinois. She also exhibited her work at the 1904 Louisiana Purchase Exposition, the Art Institute of Chicago, and the Milwaukee Art Museum.

She married Dr. Darwin Keith in 1898. In 1907 they settled in Rockford after residing for several years in London.

Keith was a member of the Rockford Art Association, and exhibited in their first show in 1913.

Believing that art and culture was as important as academic studies, Keith hired a governess in 1916 to improve the education of her children beyond what they were receiving in the public school system. The group grew to include the children of family and friends. She eventually purchased some property and established the Keith Country Day School, which is still in operation.

Keith died on May 29, 1950, in Rockford, Illinois.
