= Forward Operating Base Chapman =

US military/CIA base in Khost province, Afghanistan (2001–13)

FOB Chapman
- Khost province in Afghanistan
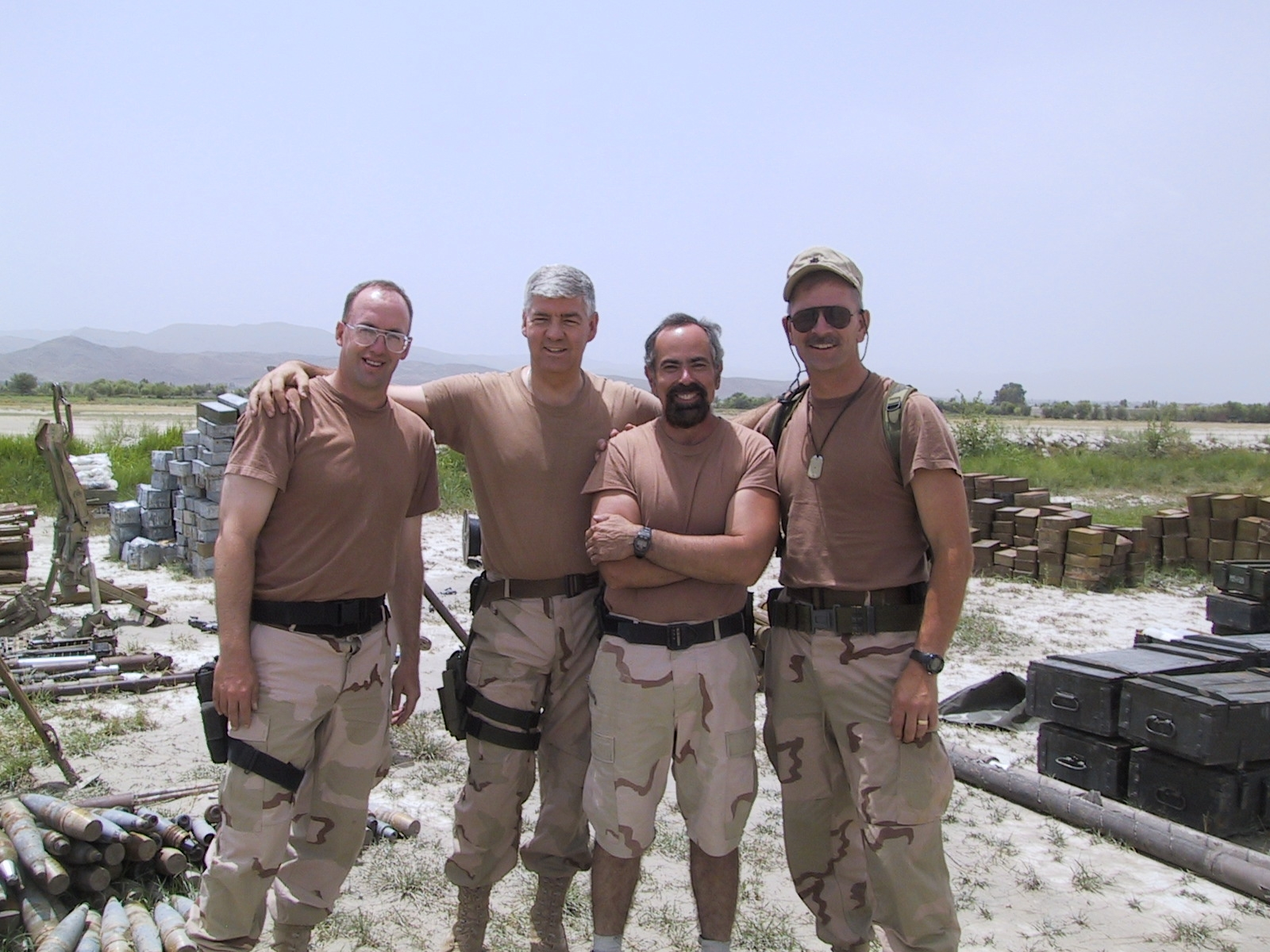
- U.S. Army Soldiers and contractors pose for a photograph at FOB Chapman in July 2002

Site information
- Type: Forward operating base
- Owner: Department of Defense / CIA
- Operator: United States Army; Central Intelligence Agency

Location
- Shown within Afghanistan
- Coordinates: 33°20′19.5″N 69°57′21.4″E

Site history
- Built: 2001
- In use: 2001-2013

Forward Operating Base Chapman, also known as Camp Chapman, was a U.S. installation situated in Khost province, Afghanistan, on an airstrip 2 miles east of Khost. It was opened by the United States Army and extensively used by the Central Intelligence Agency.

Prior to the arrival of U.S. forces in 2001 it had been used by the Afghan Armed Forces. The site was also used by the Central Intelligence Agency and was near Forward Operating Base Salerno, a large U.S. Army base. The base was named for Sergeant First Class Nathan Chapman, the first U.S. soldier killed by enemy fire during the Afghanistan war, in 2002. Chapman was killed while fighting alongside the CIA.

== History ==
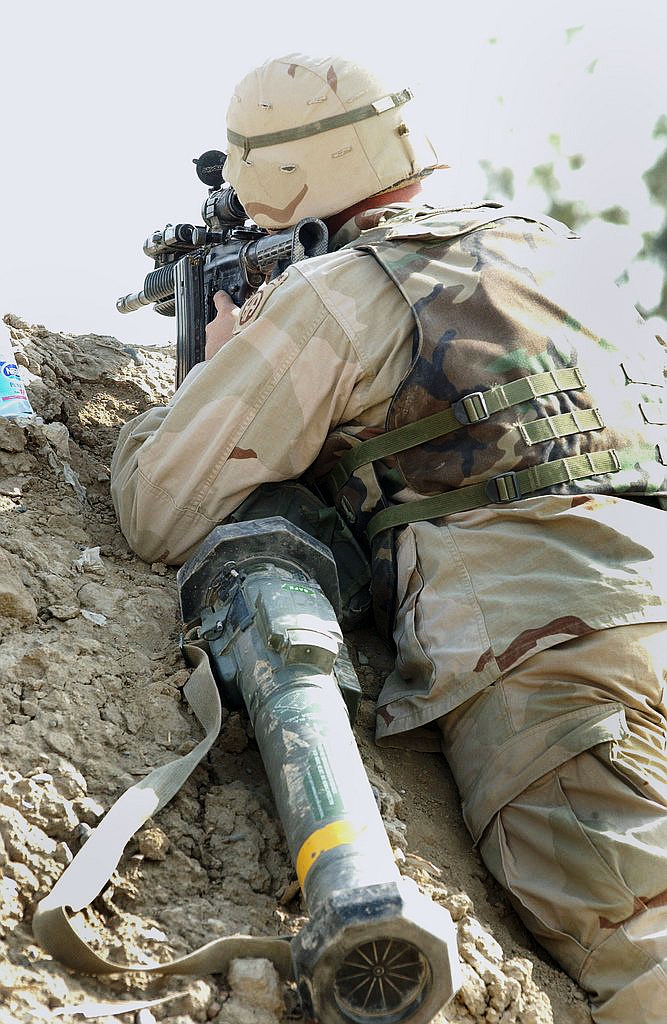
A U.S. Army soldier from the 82nd Airborne Division looks down his M4 carbine's sights outside Camp Chapman in 2002.

The CIA's base in Khost was set up at the beginning of the U.S.-led offensive against al-Qaeda and the Taliban in 2001, and began as an improvised center for operations. A military base at the beginning, it was later transformed into a CIA base, a U.S. official said. According to a U.S. military source, Forward Operating Base Chapman was also used as a base for the Khost Provincial Reconstruction Team (PRT), a military-led development group. According to an individual who was in the PRT and took part in the relocation; this team left in 2011 and moved to FOB Salerno. In recent years, the base, one of the most secretive and highly guarded locations in Afghanistan, evolved into a major counterterrorism hub of the CIA's paramilitary Special Activities Division, used for joint operation with CIA, military special operations forces and Afghan allies, and had a housing compound for U.S. intelligence officers.

On Wednesday, December 30, 2009, the Camp Chapman attack was executed by suicide bomber Humam Khalil al-Balawi who was a Jordanian double agent loyal to al-Qaeda-linked Islamist extremists. Seven people employed by or affiliated with the CIA, including the chief of the base, Jennifer Lynn Matthews as well as a Jordanian intelligence officer, died in the attack. It remains the second-deadliest incident ever for the CIA after the 1983 United States embassy bombing. Almost three years later, on December 26, 2012, a suicide bomber, possibly with ties to the Afghan Taliban (who claimed responsibility via a spokesman, Zabihullah Mujahid, claiming those who served American forces at the base were the target) and/or the Haqqani network, killed three Afghans (their status was not specified) who were outside the perimeter of the base, which is near a military airport.

U.S. bases in Khost, in particular Camp Salerno, have frequently been targeted by insurgents. In most cases, however, suicide attackers do not succeed in getting past the main entrance of a base. According to U.S. officials, Forward Operating Base Chapman appears to have implemented less stringent security measures than other U.S. military bases, aiming at establishing trust with informants. Subjecting informants to mistrust and excessive suspicion would reduce the amount of information received from them.

In 2021, in the lead-up to the withdrawal of U.S. troops from Afghanistan, the Taliban twice targeted the base. In the first attack rockets landed nearby wounding seven civilians. During the second attack a water tower on the base was hit, but no U.S. personnel were hit.
