= 1st Special Forces Group (United States) =

1st Special Forces Group (Airborne)
- 1st Special Forces Group beret flash
- Active: 24 June 1957 – 28 June 1974; 4 September 1984 – present
- Country: United States of America
- Branch: United States Army
- Type: Special Operations Forces
- Role: Primary tasks: Unconventional Warfare (UW); Foreign Internal Defense (FID); Direct Action (DA); Counter-Insurgency (COIN); Special Reconnaissance (SR); Counter-Terrorism (CT); Information Operations (IO); Counterproliferation of WMD (CP); Security Force Assistance (SFA)
- Size: 4 Battalions: One at Torii Station, Okinawa, Japan, three in Joint Base Lewis-McChord, Washington
- Part of: 1st Special Forces Command
- Garrison/HQ: Joint Base Lewis-McChord
- Motto: First in Asia
- Engagements: Vietnam War; War on terror: Operation Enduring Freedom; Operation Iraqi Freedom; Operation Inherent Resolve; Operation Freedom's Sentinel; Siege of Marawi

Insignia
- Former 1st SFG(A) recognition bar, worn by non-Special Forces qualified soldiers—in lieu of a beret flash—from the 1960s to 1984

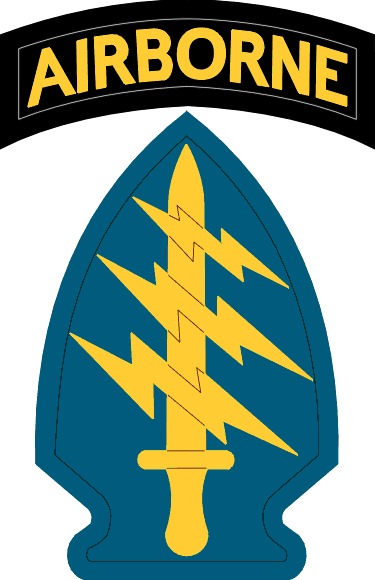
- 1st Special Forces Command (Airborne) shoulder sleeve insignia, worn by all 1st SFC(A) units

The 1st Special Forces Group (Airborne) (1st SFG) (A) is a unit of the U.S. Army Special Forces operating under the United States Pacific Command. It is designed to deploy and execute nine doctrinal missions throughout the Indo-Pacific Command area of operations: unconventional warfare, foreign internal defense, direct action, counter-insurgency, special reconnaissance, counter-terrorism, information operations, counterproliferation of weapon of mass destruction, and security force assistance.

== Unit history ==
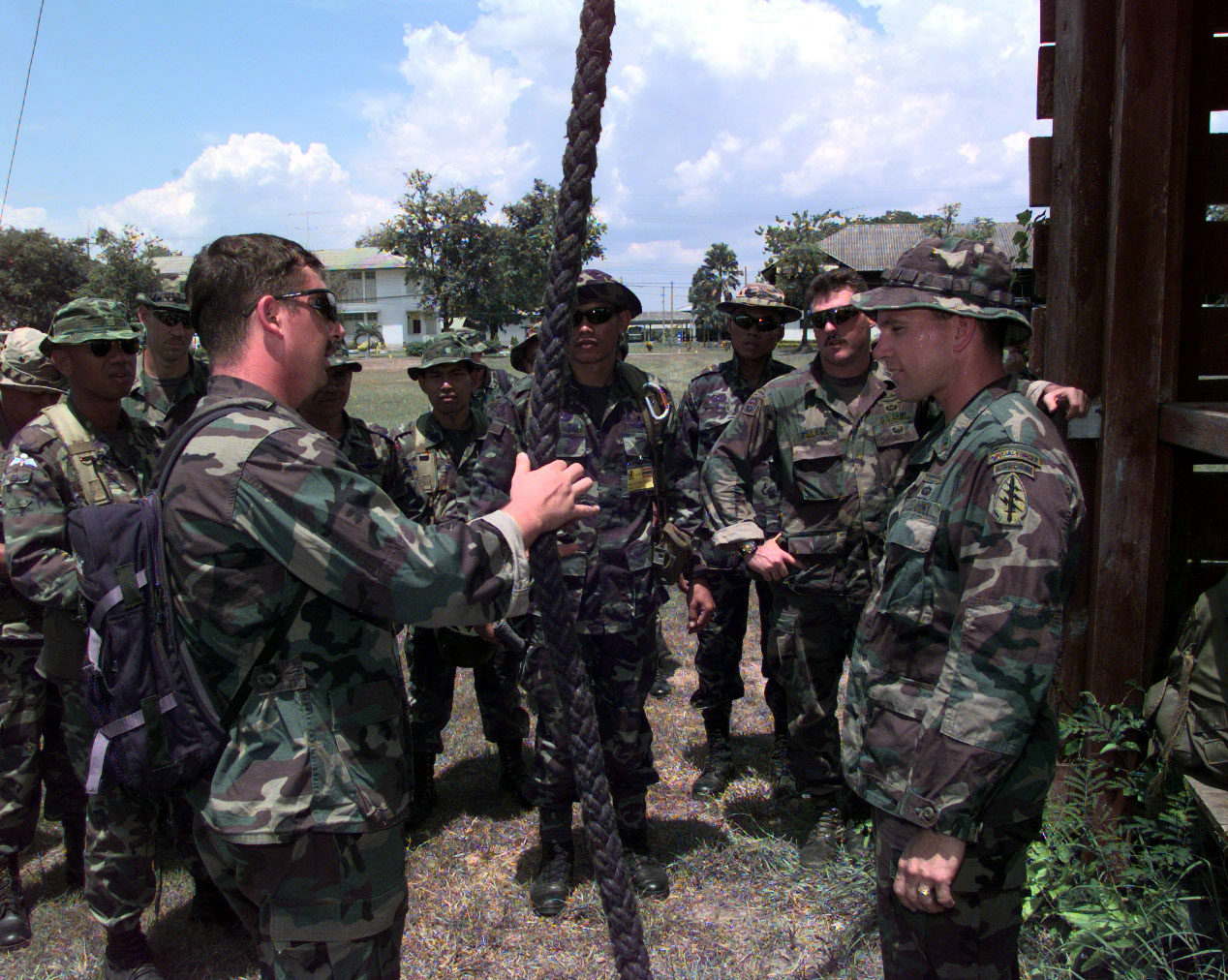
1st SFG(A) operators instructing Pa Wai Airborne soldiers at Thailand in 1998.

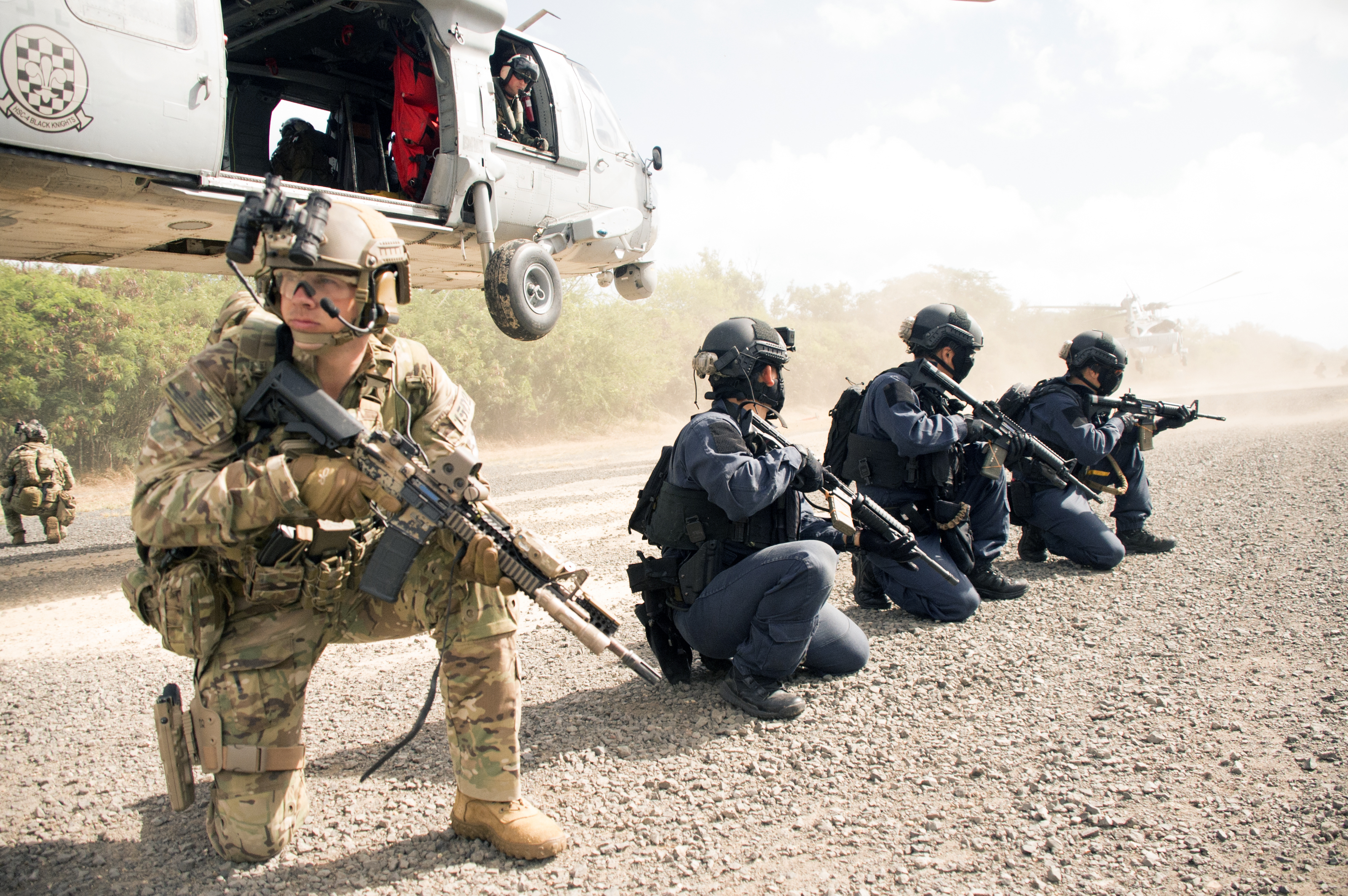
A 1st SFG(A) operator from the 1st Battalion armed with a SOPMOD Block II variant M4A1 carbine with other nation's Special Operations Forces (SOF) include 3 JSDF's SBU operators disembark from an MH-60S helicopter to take up fighting positions during the Rim of the Pacific (RIMPAC) exercise.

The 1st Special Forces Group is responsible for operations in the Pacific. Currently, the First Battalion is stationed at Okinawa while the 2nd, 3rd, 4th, and Group Support Battalions are stationed at Joint Base Lewis-McChord, Washington.

1st Special Forces Group's history began at Fort Bragg, NC, in 1955. Four Special Forces Operational Detachments - the 12th, 13th, 14th, and 16th - were selected from the 77th Special Forces Group and transferred to the Pacific theater over the next year. 1st Special Forces Group was officially activated at Fort Buckner, Okinawa, on 24 June 1957, with LTC A. Scott Madding as commander and MSG Robert L. Voss as the sergeant major. The 1st Special Forces Group holds the distinction of having the first and last Special Forces soldiers killed in Vietnam: Captain Harry Cramer killed 21 October 1957, and Captain Richard M. Rees killed 15 December 1973. Decades later, another 1st Special Forces Group soldier became the first American to die by hostile fire in Afghanistan: Sergeant First Class Nathan Chapman killed 2 January 2002.

The 1st Special Forces Group on Okinawa was one of two Special Action Forces/Security Assistance Forces (SAF) built around Special Forces Groups. The other was built around the 8th Special Forces Group in Panama. SAF Asia was flexible and 1st Group could task organize a detachment for any time of mission in the Pacific rim. During the Vietnam War, it sent teams to Vietnam for six-month temporary duty. It also ran Camp Hardy Combat Training Center in the Northern Training Area of Okinawa to train SF, Navy SEALs, and US Marines deploying to Vietnam. It also earned the Meritorious Unit Commendation for its work during the year 1973.

Following the war in South Vietnam, and the withdrawal of American military forces from Southeast Asia, the emphasis on military actions shifted away from the Asia-Pacific region and focused more on Europe and NATO. Special Forces, which had grown to a total of seven groups in 1963, faced severe cuts in the peacetime army; as a result, 1st Group was inactivated 28 June 1974 at Ft. Bragg, NC. After a 10-year hiatus, the need for an Asian unconventional warfare force was recognized, and Alpha Company, 1st Battalion was reactivated at Fort Bragg on 15 March 1984. This company and the remainder of the 1st Battalion were assembled and deployed to Torii Station, Okinawa during the spring and summer of 1984. The 2nd and 3rd Battalions, along with Headquarters and Service Company were officially reactivated 4 September 1984 at Fort Lewis, Washington.

Brought back to life as part of overall growth in the support to U.S. strategic efforts in Asia, the unit focused on the Pacific Command area of operations but were routinely deployed out of Asia to support unified commanders throughout the world. Unit members supported theater security engagement within the PACOM area of operations, contingency operations in Haiti, Central Asia, and Bosnia. Operational Detachments "Alpha" deployed to Haiti to conduct Coalition Support Team missions in 1993–94 in support of U.S. Joint Task Force 190 and Multi-National Force operations supporting Operation Uphold Democracy. Additional ODAs conducted Humanitarian Demining Operations in Laos, Thailand, Cambodia, and Vietnam earning Humanitarian Service Medals for their efforts in both Laos and Thailand. Elements from the 1st SFG (A) conducted training with military units from newly created states from the former Soviet Union that supported the development of the Central Asian Battalion (CENTRASBAT), a regional peace-keeping force in the mid-1990s. By the end of the millennium, 1st SFG (A) soldiers had deployed for the Stabilization Force in Bosnia-Herzegovina.

Following the 11 September attacks, members of the 1st SFG (A) deployed to support Operation Enduring Freedom in Afghanistan and sustained back-to-back battalion rotations to the Philippines. Starting in February 2002, elements of the 1st SFG (A) deployed to conduct unconventional warfare in the Southern Philippines by and with the Armed Forces of the Philippines (AFP) in order to assist the Government of the Philippines (GOP).

Over the next three years, 1st SFG (A) members built an significant record in the Philippines training six light infantry battalions, three light reaction companies from the Armed Forces of the Philippines (AFP), treating over 31,000 Filipinos in MEDCAP events, helping to professionalize the AFP, and providing operations and intelligence fusion teams to actively assist the AFP in targeting militant cells. Throughout 2003–2004, the 1st SFG (A) deployed numerous personnel in support of Operation Iraqi Freedom and Operation Enduring Freedom in Iraq and Afghanistan respectively. By November 2004 the unit deployed an entire battalion to Afghanistan as part of the Combined Joint Special Operations Task Force- Afghanistan (CJSOTF-A).

Today, 1st SFG (A) supported the global war on terrorism with operations in the Philippines, Iraq and Afghanistan as well as maintaining US security relationships with partner nations throughout the Pacific until 2021.

== Lineage ==
Constituted 5 July 1942 in the Army of the United States as the 2d Company, 1st Battalion, First Regiment, 1st Special Service Force, a combined Canadian-American organization

Activated on 9 July 1942 at Fort William Henry Harrison, Montana

Disbanded on 6 January 1945 in France

Reconstituted on 15 April 1960 in the Regular Army; concurrently consolidated with Company B, 1st Ranger Infantry Battalion (activated 19 June 1942), and consolidated unit redesignated as Headquarters and Headquarters Company, 1st Special Forces Group, 1st Special Forces

Consolidated on 30 September 1960 with Headquarters and Headquarters Company, 1st Special Forces Group (constituted 14 June 1957 in the Regular Army and activated 24 June 1957 in Japan), and the consolidated unit was designated as Headquarters and Headquarters Company, 1st Special Forces Group, 1st Special Forces (organic units concurrently constituted and activated 4 October 1960)

Group inactivated 30 June 1974 at Fort Bragg, North Carolina

Activated 1 September 1984 at Fort Lewis, Washington

(Former Company B, 1st Ranger Infantry Battalion, withdrawn 3 February 1986, consolidated with Company N, 75th Infantry, and consolidated unit redesignated as Company N, 75th Ranger Regiment – hereafter separate lineage)

Redesignated 1 October 2005 as the 1st Special Forces Group, 1st Special Forces Regiment

== Organization ==
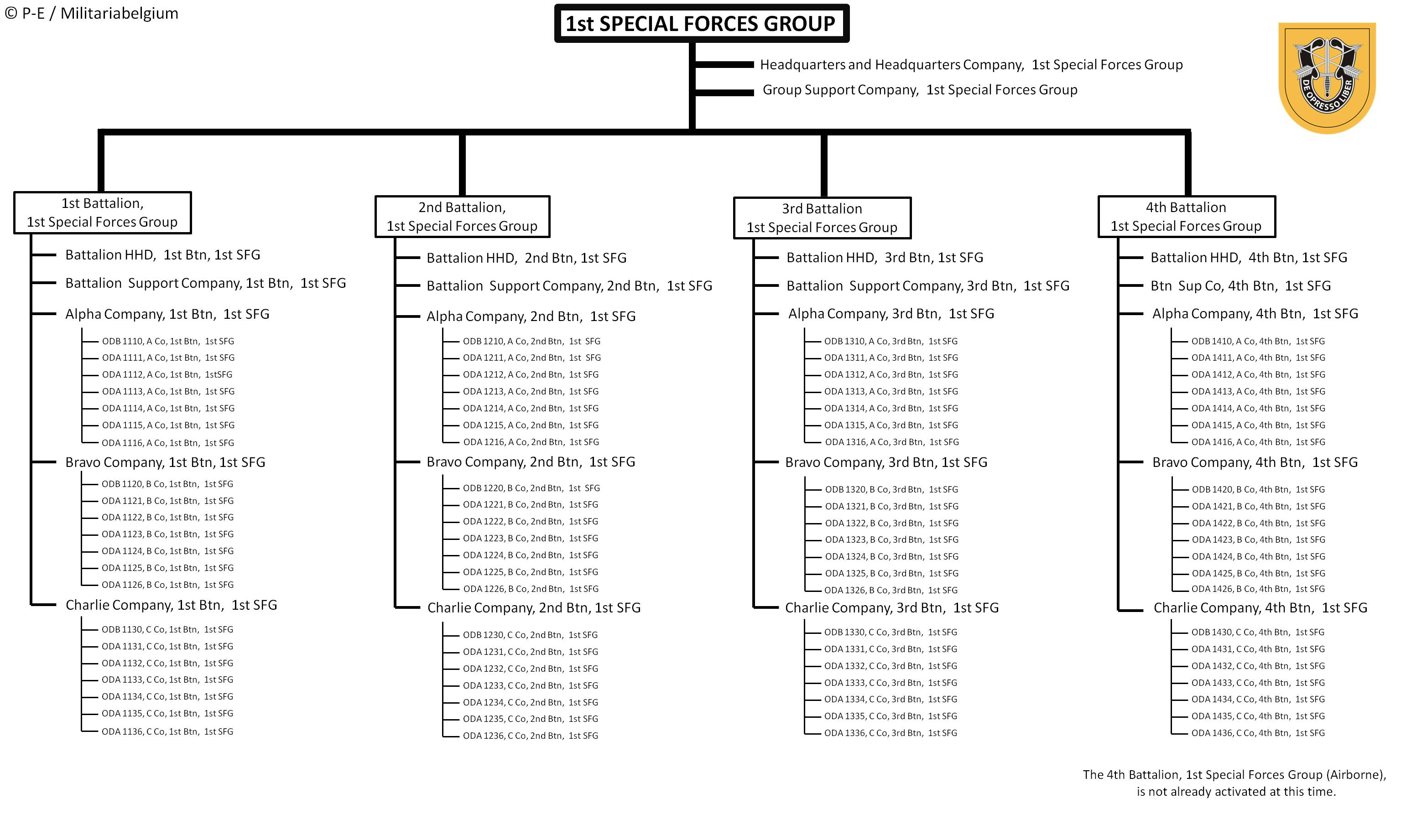
Current structure of the 1st SFG (A)

== Campaign participation credit ==
* signifies Earned Credit

World War II:

Aleutian Islands*

Naples-Foggia*

Anzio*, Rome-Arno*

Southern France (with arrowhead)*

Rhineland*

War on Terrorism (Additional campaigns to be determined)

1st Special Forces Battalion entitled to:

Global war on terrorism

2nd Special Forces Battalion entitled to:

Afghanistan: Consolidation I

== Decorations ==
- Meritorious Unit Commendation (Army), Streamer embroidered PACIFIC AREA 1972–1973
- Meritorious Unit Commendation (Army), Streamer embroidered ASIA 2002
- Meritorious Unit Commendation (Army), Streamer embroidered SOUTHWEST ASIA 2014–2015
- Army Superior Unit Award, Streamer embroidered 2013
- Philippine Presidential Unit Citation, Streamer embroidered JULY-AUGUST 1972

1st Special Forces Battalion elements entitled to:

Company A, 1st Special Forces Battalion entitled to:

Valorous Unit Award, Streamer embroidered EASTERN AFGHANISTAN FEB-SEP 2012

Company C, 1st Special Forces Battalion entitled to:

Valorous Unit Award, Streamer embroidered CENTRAL AND SOUTHERN IRAQ 2007

Valorous Unit Award, Streamer embroidered CENTRAL IRAQ 2008–2009

2nd Special Forces Battalion entitled to:

- Meritorious Unit Commendation (Army), Streamer embroidered AFGHANISTAN 2013–2014

Company A, 2d Special Forces Battalion entitled to:

Meritorious Unit Commendation (Army), Streamer embroidered IRAQ JUL 2009-JAN 2010

Company B, 2d Special Forces Battalion entitled to:

Presidential Unit Citation (Navy), Streamer embroidered HELMAND RIVER VALLEY 2010

Valorous Unit Award, Streamer embroidered AFGHANISTAN MAY-NOV 2013

Company C, 2d Special Forces Battalion entitled to:

Valorous Unit Award, Streamer embroidered CENTRAL AND SOUTHERN IRAQ 2007

Army Superior Unit Award, Streamer embroidered 2017

3rd Special Forces Battalion entitled to:

- Valorous Unit Award, Streamer embroidered AFGHANISTAN 2011–2012
- Meritorious Unit Commendation (Army), Streamer embroidered WAR ON TERRORISM 2011–2012

Company A, 3d Special Forces Battalion entitled to:

Presidential Unit Citation (Army), Streamer embroidered AFGHANISTAN JUL-DEC 2016

Valorous Unit Award, Streamer embroidered AFGHANISTAN JUN-AUG 2010

Company B, 3d Special Forces Battalion entitled to:

Meritorious Unit Commendation (Army), Streamer embroidered AFGHANISTAN AUG 2010-APR 2011

4th Special Forces Battalion entitled to:

- Meritorious Unit Commendation (Army), Streamer embroidered AFGHANISTAN 2011–2012
- Army Superior Unit Award, Streamer embroidered 2016–2018

Support Battalion elements entitled to:

Company A, Support Battalion entitled to:

Meritorious Unit Commendation (Army), Streamer embroidered AFGHANISTAN MAY 2011-FEB 2012
