= Humam Khalil Abu-Mulal al-Balawi =

Jordanian doctor and suicide bomber (1977–2009)

- Born: Humam Khalil Abu-Mulal al-Balawi; 25 December 1977; Kuwait
- Died: 30 December 2009 (aged 32); Khost, Afghanistan
- Cause of death: Suicide bombing
- Occupations: Doctor, suicide bomber
- Years active: 2009
- Organization: Al-Qaeda
- Known for: Suicide bombing at Camp Chapman

Humam Khalil Abu-Mulal al-Balawi (25 December 1977 – 30 December 2009) was a Jordanian doctor and a triple agent suicide bomber, who was loyal to Islamist extremists of al-Qaeda, and who carried out the Camp Chapman attack, which was a suicide attack against a CIA base near Khost, Afghanistan on 30 December 2009.

== Aliases ==
An Afghan security official gave al-Balawi's name as Hamman Khalil Abu Mallal al-Balawi. The Arab newspaper The National referred to him as Homam Khaleel Mohammad Abu Mallal. He also used the alias Abu Dujana al-Khurasani or Dujana al-Khurasani when writing for jihadi websites. Hajj Yacoub, a self-proclaimed spokesman for the Pakistani Taliban, identified him as Hamman Khalil Mohammed.

== Biography ==
Al-Balawi was born in Kuwait on 25 December 1977. His ancestral roots were Palestinian, his tribe originating from the Beersheba region, now located in the Negev desert of Israel. He grew up in a middle-class family of nine other children, including an identical twin brother, and lived in Kuwait until Iraq's 1990 invasion of the country, when the family moved to Jordan. He graduated with honors from an Amman high school.

Al-Balawi studied medicine for six years in Turkey at Istanbul University and graduated in 2002. He also received medical training at the University of Jordan Hospital and at the Islamic Hospital of Amman, run by a charity linked to Jordan’s Islamic Brotherhood. He was married to Dafinah Bairak (Defne Bayrak), a Turkish journalist and translator, with whom he had two children. They lived in the lower-income Amman suburb of Jabal Nuzhah.

Al-Balawi had a history of supporting violent Islamist causes. He was tagged by the National Intelligence Organization of Turkey as having a relation with the Great Eastern Islamic Raiders' Front. It is not clear whether this information was shared with other intelligence organizations. According to the SITE Intelligence Group, which monitors extremist websites, he was a well-known contributor to al-Hesbah, an online forum run by Islamist extremists. He also ran his own Islamist blog.

Al-Balawi was arrested by the Jordanian security service in late 2007 and was believed to have been transformed into a double agent loyal to the U.S. and to Jordan. According to Western government officials, al-Balawi had been recruited by Jordan's General Intelligence Directorate and taken to Afghanistan. The Jordanian intelligence service is one of the CIA's closest allies in the Middle East.

According to intelligence officials, al-Balawi had been invited to FOB Chapman after claiming to have information related to senior al-Qaeda leader Ayman al-Zawahiri. He was not closely searched because of his perceived value as someone who could infiltrate the ranks of senior al-Qaeda leaders. The CIA had come to trust the informant, and the Jordanian spy agency vouched for him, according to officials.

According to a Jordanian report, al-Balawi was an "informant, who offered dangerous and important information which the authorities said they had to take seriously", but not recruited by the CIA or Jordanian intelligence. He was "only a trusted source who went onto the base without inspection" the official said.

== Last statement ==
Al-Balawi appeared in a video released after his death and was shown saying that the attack was carried out in revenge for the 2009 killing of the Pakistani Taliban leader Baitullah Mehsud.

In his last statement issued by Al-Qaeda's media wing As-Sahab, he revealed that Jordanian intelligence was co-operating with the CIA to kill or capture senior Al-Qaeda and other militant group leaders. He further claimed that the Jordanian Intelligence Directorate assisted the CIA in killing Imad Mughniyah, a senior Hizbullah militant killed in Lebanon, and Abdullah Azzam, senior Afghan jihad leader, as well as assisting them to eliminate Abu Musab al-Zarqawi, who was the head of al-Qaeda in Iraq (AQI), the predecessor to the Islamic State.

== Interrogation of Al-Balawi's wife ==
After Al-Balawi's death, his wife Defne Bayrak was interrogated for almost five hours by Istanbul Security Directorate (Turkish police). According to the leaked information, the first question asked during the interrogation was how they had met each other to which she replied that they met in a chat room on a website that she accessed to learn Arabic. It is also said that CIA officials brought a file, containing information on al-Balawi and questions to ask during interrogation, and gave it to Istanbul Anti-Terror Branch Directorate. However, Istanbul Security Directorate denied any CIA involvement. Later, she gave extensive interviews to Newsweek Turkey and CNN. She also complained to The Association of Human Rights and Solidarity of Oppressed People in Turkey about being constantly bothered by reporters.
