= Khost =

City in Khost Province, Afghanistan

Khost خوست
- Provincial capital
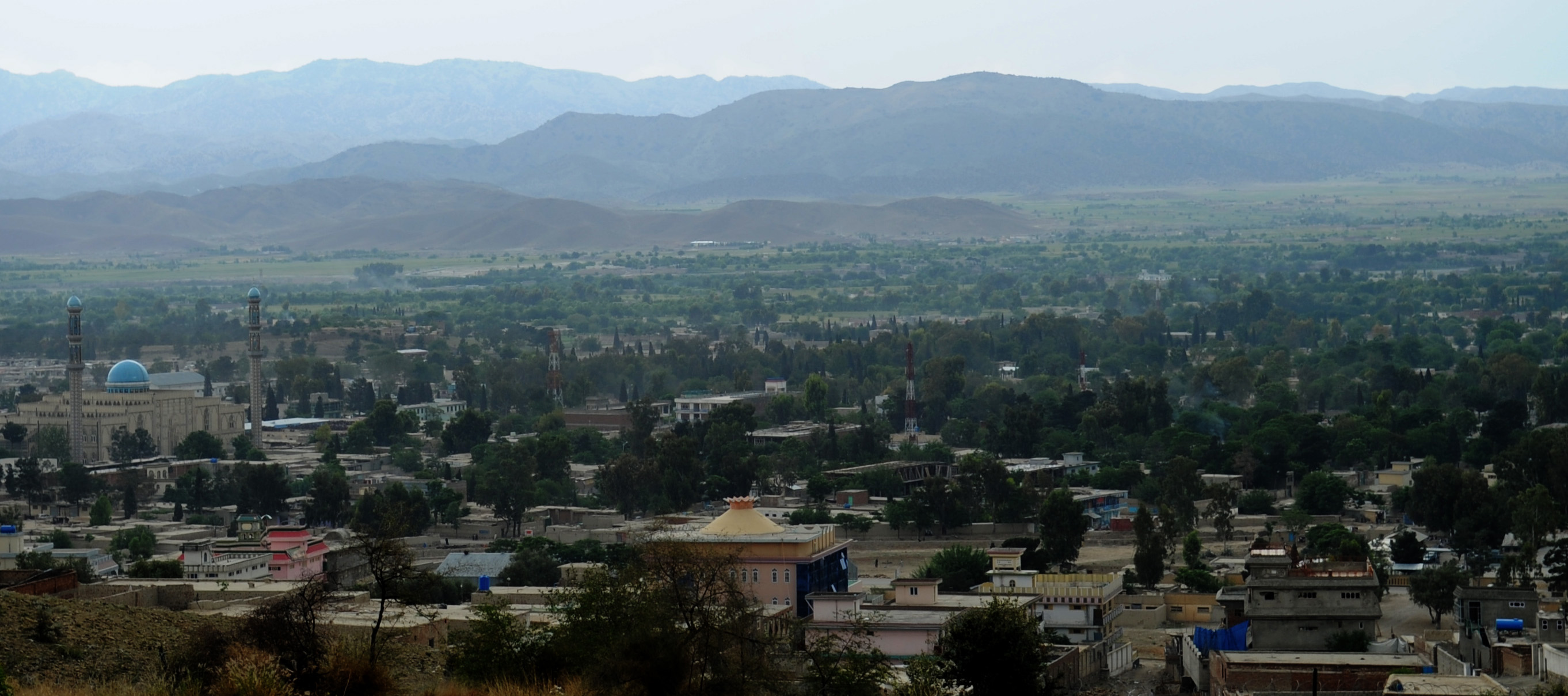
- View from the central hill toward Khost Mosque

- Location in Afghanistan
- Country: Afghanistan
- Province: Khost
- District: Khost

Government
  - Type: Municipality
  - Mayor: Mufti Shahzad Noor Rashid
- Elevation: 1,225 m (4,019 ft)

Population (2025)
  - Provincial capital: 170,615
  - Urban: 15,104
- Time zone: UTC+04:30 (Afghanistan Time)
- Postal code: 25XX

Khost (Pashto, (Note: Pashto pronunciation: [xost̪]) Dari: (Note: Dari pronunciation: [xoːst̪]) خوست) is a city in eastern Afghanistan, serving as the capital of Khost Province. The city is within the jurisdiction of Khost District and has an estimated population of 170,615 people. It is the largest city in the southeastern part of the country, and also the largest in the region of Loya Paktia.

Khost is home to Shaikh Zayed University. The Khost International Airport is located in the eastern area of the city. The current mayor of the city is Mufti Shahzad Noor Rashid. His predecessor was Bismillah Bilal.

== Geography ==
Khost is located about 150 km (93 mi) south of Kabul. It lies on a plateau not below 1,000 m (3,300 ft) in elevation that extends to the east for about 40 km (25 mi) until the Afghanistan-Pakistan border. Thirty kilometres to the north the peaks rise up to 2,500 to 3,000 m (8,200 to 9,800 ft) while farther south 20 km (12 mi) away from the border, the average is around 1,800 m (5,900 ft).

=== Land use ===
Khost is the provincial administrative seat in eastern Afghanistan. Being close to the border with Pakistan, Khost straddles an important transport corridor. The eastern districts (1–3) are dotted with forests and residential settlements while the western districts (4–5) are more barren and lightly populated. Water courses account for 5% of total land surface.

=== Climate ===
Khost has a semi-arid climate (Köppen BSk though very close to qualifying as BSh). Khost is located in the "Khost Bowl", a valley with lower elevation than the surrounding highlands. The geography afforded more moderate weather conditions. With a January average of 4.8 °C (40.6 °F), Khost has noticeably milder winters, compared to the much harsher and snowy winters of the surrounding higher towns to the north, west, and south (listed anticlockwise): Parachinar, Tari Mangal, Aryob, Tsamkani, Khandkhel, Gardez, Zurmat, Sharana, Zerok, Urgun, Angur Ada, Kaniguram, and Razmak. Nonetheless, frosts are still frequent in the early mornings.

Most unusually for Afghanistan, Khost receives a substantial proportion of its annual rainfall of 475 mm (19 in) from the South Asian monsoon. The valley being open to the southeast (towards the lower elevation Miranshah), the moisture-laden winds bring much welcomed rain during the summer. The remaining portion of the year Khost remains hot and dry. Sporadic droughts occur when the summer monsoon fails to bring the needed precipitation.

Climate data for Khost, Afghanistan
Month	Jan	Feb	Mar	Apr	May	Jun	Jul	Aug	Sep	Oct	Nov	Dec	Year
Record high °C (°F)	22.1 (71.8)	26.9 (80.4)	32.3 (90.1)	37.0 (98.6)	40.2 (104.4)	46.4 (115.5)	41.5 (106.7)	37.8 (100.0)	40.0 (104.0)	33.2 (91.8)	29.0 (84.2)	22.0 (71.6)	46.4 (115.5)
Mean daily maximum °C (°F)	12.7 (54.9)	13.8 (56.8)	19.1 (66.4)	25.1 (77.2)	30.3 (86.5)	35.4 (95.7)	33.6 (92.5)	32.3 (90.1)	30.5 (86.9)	26.4 (79.5)	20.1 (68.2)	14.8 (58.6)	24.5 (76.1)
Daily mean °C (°F)	4.8 (40.6)	7.0 (44.6)	12.2 (54.0)	17.5 (63.5)	22.6 (72.7)	28.0 (82.4)	27.4 (81.3)	26.4 (79.5)	23.3 (73.9)	17.9 (64.2)	11.0 (51.8)	6.4 (43.5)	17.0 (62.6)
Mean daily minimum °C (°F)	−0.9 (30.4)	1.1 (34.0)	5.8 (42.4)	10.4 (50.7)	14.3 (57.7)	19.8 (67.6)	21.3 (70.3)	21.2 (70.2)	16.5 (61.7)	10.3 (50.5)	3.6 (38.5)	0.0 (32.0)	10.2 (50.4)
Record low °C (°F)	−8.5 (16.7)	−10.4 (13.3)	−3.3 (26.1)	1.0 (33.8)	5.4 (41.7)	9.5 (49.1)	13.3 (55.9)	14.6 (58.3)	7.2 (45.0)	0.0 (32.0)	−6 (21)	−5.5 (22.1)	−10.4 (13.3)
Average precipitation mm (inches)	25.9 (1.02)	53.6 (2.11)	61.8 (2.43)	65.2 (2.57)	39.8 (1.57)	21.6 (0.85)	75.9 (2.99)	62.0 (2.44)	30.5 (1.20)	7.7 (0.30)	11.6 (0.46)	20.9 (0.82)	476.5 (18.76)
Average precipitation days (≥ 1.0 mm)	4.1	5.8	9.2	9.1	5.7	2.5	7.9	7.0	3.6	2.2	2.2	3.1	62.4
Average relative humidity (%)	60	62	62	59	50	46	63	68	62	56	56	59	59
Mean monthly sunshine hours	198.4	183.6	207.7	234.0	291.4	285.0	251.1	248.0	270.0	251.1	243.0	176.7	2,840
Source 1: NOAA (1972-1983)
Source 2: (sunshine and precipitation days)

== History ==
=== 19th and 20th centuries ===
During the Second Anglo-Afghan War, British forces led by Lord Roberts invaded Khost from what is now Pakistan. Approximately 8,000 raiders from the Mangal tribe, which had a long tradition of resisting outside control, launched several attacks on weakly protected British supply convoys in Khost. In reprisal, Lord Roberts ordered his forces to attack eleven Mangal villages which had launched raids that murdered several of his camp followers, resulting in them being sacked and burnt. Once news of the reprisals became known in Britain, his political opponents in the British Parliament criticized Lord Roberts' actions. At the end of the conflict, British forces withdrew from Khost.

==== Khost rebellions ====
Between 1856 and 1925, Khost was the site of three rebellions, lasting from 1856 to 1857, 1912, and 1924–1925 respectively.

During the Soviet–Afghan War, Khost was the object of a siege that lasted for more than eight years. Soon after the invasion of Afghanistan by Soviet troops, Afghan mujahideen took control of the only land route between Khost and Gardez, effectively putting a stop to the Soviet advance.

During the assault on the Zhawar Kili Cave complex, the Soviets used the Khost Airfield as an initial staging ground to insert troops into the combat zone, using Mil Mi-8 armed helicopter transport ships. By April 1995, Khost was under the control of the Taliban.

=== 21st century ===
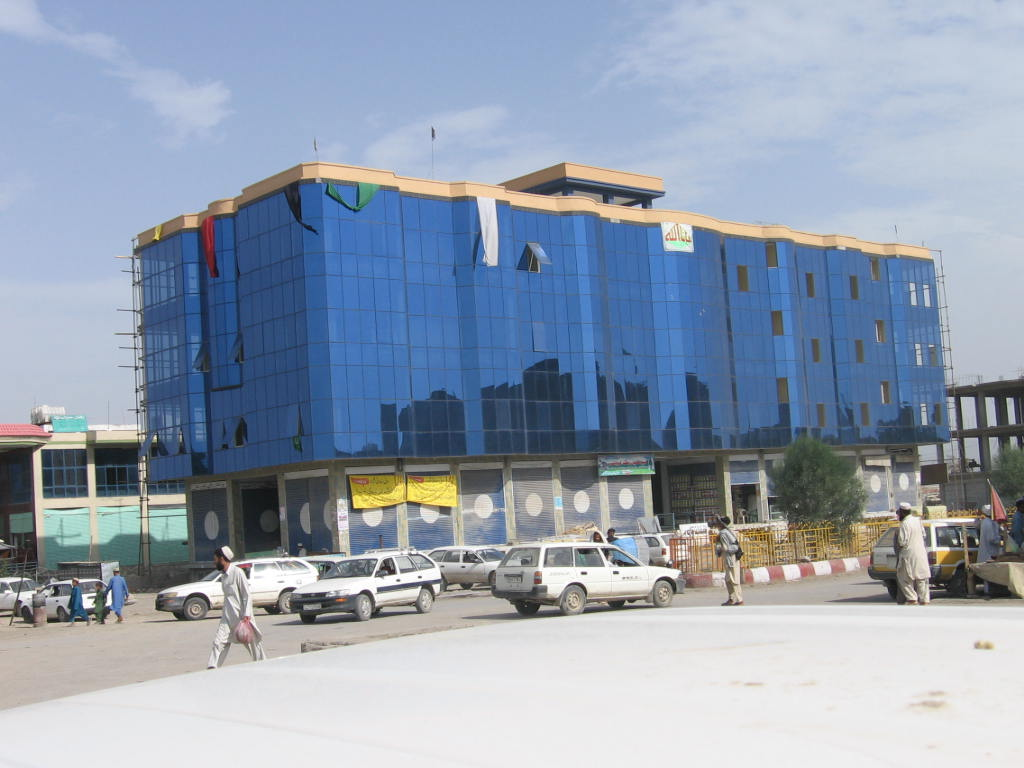
A business center in Khost under construction in 2007

During the war in Afghanistan (2001–2021), the United States built Forward Operating Base Chapman near Khost. Due to its location in southeastern Afghanistan, it was a hotbed for Taliban-led insurgents attempting to dislodge the American forces there. Like most other provinces, Khost became home to maneuver forces and a Provincial Reconstruction Team (PRT). Maneuver forces would wage war against insurgents and assist the Afghan National Security Forces in operations, while the PRT handled the reconstruction aspects.

In early 2007, Lieutenant Colonel Scottie Custer of the 82nd Airborne Division saw that the best way to limit insurgent activity in Khost was to forward-deploy some 187 paratroopers under his command to Force Protection Facilities (FPF) in Khost's various district centers around sub-governors' mansions, to directly protect these, maintain a visible presence in population centers, and help mentor Afghan government forces operating across Khost.

The FPFs brought a broader sense of security and prosperity to surrounding areas. Bazaars, shops, and gas stations have improved the quality of life for local residents. The Mandozai Force Protection Facilities in Khost include a medical clinic attached to further assist Afghans in need of basic medical assistance. The offices of Khost's various sub-governors had experienced an increased activity as Afghan civilians went there to settle disputes and voice concerns instead of going through traditional tribal channels and bribes, cutting down on sectarian suspicion and strife.

Throughout 2007 and 2008, roads had been improved, businesses were springing up and schools were being built, at least 50 in 2007 alone with another 25 planned for 2008. A new airport was under construction as the Khost Airfield was used by the US Military, creating new opportunities and jobs. The RT, led by CDR David Adams was instrumental in connecting the people to the government in the city, by ensuring the PRT was able to execute over $2.5 million under the Commanders Emergency Response Program (CERP).

On 12 May 2009, several teams of armed militants stormed Khost, prompting a heavy 6-hour battle with US and Afghan government forces. Reportedly the attack involved 10 suicide bombers, of whom seven were able to detonate and three were shot.

On 20 November 2009 a bomb killed 3 civilians and wounded 3 others as a car hit a roadside bomb in the city. According to the chief of criminal investigation the act was perpetrated by the Taliban.

On 24 November 2009, according to the Afghan Ministry of Interior, 6 people, including 5 children were killed when a remote control bomb attacked a water station in the city which had been built by the Ministry of Rural Rehabilitation and Development to distribute water to the locals.

On 30 December 2009, Humam Khalil Abu-Mulal al-Balawi attacked the now-closed Forward Operating Base Chapman in which he killed seven CIA officers, including one Afghan and one Jordian.

On 18 February 2011, a suicide car bomber targeted a police checkpoint and killed 11 people. On 14 July 2011, according to a spokesman for the provincial government, NATO ground troops killed six civilians in a night raid of the village of Toora Worai, in an area known as Matoon, about seven kilometres from the city.

On 15 August 2021, Khost was seized by Taliban fighters, becoming the twenty-eighth provincial capital to be captured as part of the wider 2021 Taliban offensive. At least 29 people died in Khost during the June 2022 Afghanistan earthquake.

== Demographics ==
The Khost municipality has an estimated population of around 170,615 people, while the whole province has an estimated population of 694,197 people. They are mostly Pashtuns from various tribes such as Banusi, Gurbaz, Ismailkhel, Mangal, Muqbal, Sabari, Tani, Wazir, Zadran, Zazai, etc., residing in 11,787 dwellings. Pashto is the dominant language in Khost although many of its residents are also fluent in Dari and other languages.

== Economy ==
Khost serves as one of Afghanistan's trading centers with neighboring Khyber Pakhtunkhwa in Pakistan. The Ghulam Khan border crossing between the two countries is located about 20 mi (32 km) to the south. Pine nuts are among the noteworthy export products of the province.

== Education ==
Khost has a number of public and private schools. After completing high school, students can pursue higher education by either enrolling in Shaikh Zayed University or in other universities across the country.

== Sports ==
The three most popular sports in Khost are cricket (86%), basketball (19%) and football (11%). The spinners of the Afghanistan national cricket team, Mujeeb Ur Rahman, and batsman Noor Ali, as well as Nawroz Mangal, the former captain hail from Khost. Dawlat Zadran, the paceman who grabbed two crucial wickets against Pakistan (in 1st International One Day against Full Member), is also from Khost. In football, Khost and the surrounding region is represented by De Abasin Sape F.C, in the Afghan Premier League.

Professional sports teams from Khost

Club	League	Sport	Venue	Established
Paktia Panthers	Afghanistan Premier League	Cricket	Sharjah Cricket Stadium	2018
Mis Ainak Knights	Shpageeza Cricket League	Cricket	Khost Cricket Stadium	2013
De Abasin Sape F.C.	Afghan Premier League	Football	Khost City Ground	2012

=== Stadiums ===
- Khost Cricket Stadium, constructed with financial support from Germany. The inauguration of the stadium also included an exhibitory match which witnessed a record crowd for any sport played in Afghanistan.
- Khost City Ground, a multi-purpose stadium in Khost for football and other sports.

== Notable people ==
- Nawroz Mangal
- Noor Ali Zadran
- Mujeeb Zadran
- Rahmanullah Gurbaz
- Fazal Niazai
- Ibrahim Zadran
- Dawlat Zadran
- Noor Ahmad

== See also ==
- List of cities in Afghanistan
