= Kurram Militia =

- Active: 18 October 1892 (133 years, 6 months)
- Country: Pakistan
- Branch: Frontier Corps
- Type: Paramilitary force
- Role: Law enforcement/Border patrol
- Size: ~3,500 in 5 battalions
- Garrison/HQ: Parachinar
- Regimental colours: Black flag with unit crest
- Engagements: Tirah Campaign; Third Anglo-Afghan War; Indo-Pakistani War of 1947; Indo-Pakistani War of 1965

Commanders
- Commandant: Colonel Tausif

Insignia
- Unit Crest: Crossed Turi knives with the letter "KM" superimposed

The Kurram Militia is a paramilitary regiment of the Frontier Corps of Pakistan. It was originally raised by the British in 1892 to operate in the North-West Frontier Province, and carried in that role following Pakistan's independence in 1947.

== Formation ==
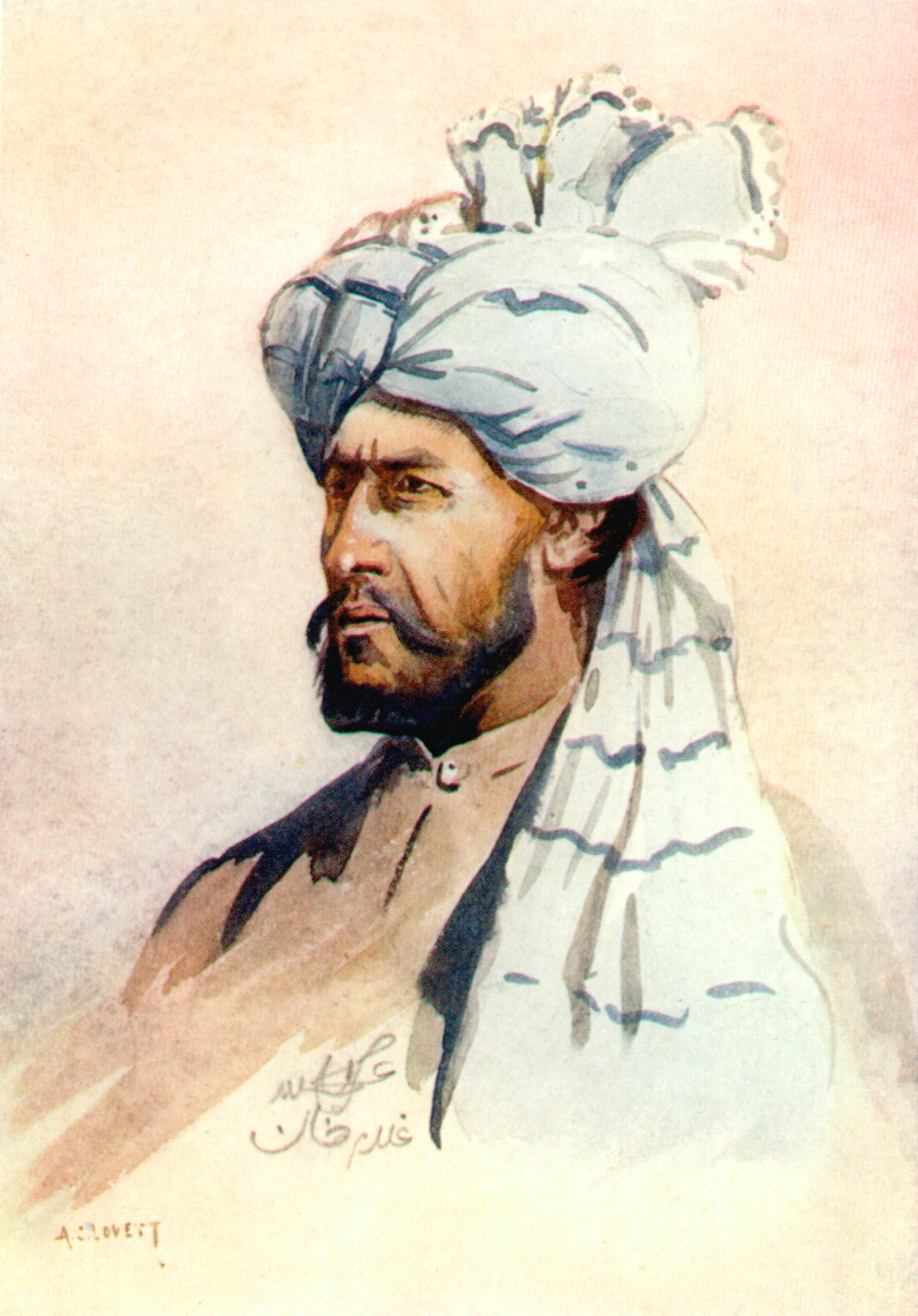
Watercolour of a member of the Kurram Militia by Major Alfred Crowdy Lovett, 1910

British troops of the Kurram Valley Field Force, under the command of Colonel Frederick Roberts, first entered the Kurram Valley in 1878, during the Second Anglo-Afghan War, to mount operations against the Afghans. Although the purpose of this expedition was not the permanent occupation of the valley, the British soon realized the necessity and importance of holding it. General Henry Rawlinson noted:

"I am quite certain that the permanent occupation of Kurram Valley is the right solution for this part of the Frontier and will be real economy in the end. It will divide the Waziri group of tribesmen from the Afridi group".

Some years later the Turis (a major tribe in the valley) found themselves under attack from the Lower Kurram by Bangash and Zaimukht tribesmen, and also threatened by the Afghans, and so requested British help. Sir Olaf Caroe wrote:

"In 1891 Samana was occupied and forts were built along its crest protecting Meranzai from flank attack from that direction. In the following year (i.e 1892) it was at last decided to move beyond Thall into Kurram".

The British military historian Charles à Court Repington wrote:

"This valley is inhabited by the Turi tribe and at the desire of this community its affairs were taken over by British Administration in 1892. When the rising of 1897 began, the Turis remained most faithful and helped us materially in resisting the powerful tribe of Orakzai. It is an encouraging symptom that Shia Orakzai recently have asked us to take over the affairs of their country in the same manner as the Turis have done".

In October 1892, in order to defend the area, the British created the Turi Militia, recruited from the local inhabitants. It was initially based at Balish Khel near Sadda, but within a few months the unit's headquarters were moved to Parachinar, and it was renamed the Kurram Militia. The militia was originally divided into two parts: the 1st Battalion as a mobile column, while the 2nd Battalion garrisoned the valley. This proved impracticable, and in 1902 the two battalions were amalgamated under a single commander, and organized into two wings, each of three companies. In 1894 the total strength of the militia was 948, and by 1905 it had increased to 1,475.

== Operations ==
The Kurram Militia first saw action during the Tirah Campaign in late 1897. On 1 September Orakzai tribesmen attacked a militia post at Balish Khel near Sadda. The garrison held off the attackers for 24 hours, though twenty Kurram Militia men were killed, until the arrival of the flying column. Sadda itself, was attacked on 16 September by about 2,000 Orakzai, but they were repulsed by a combined Army and Militia force.

In 1902 the Kurram Militia provided 200 men for the successful operations against Wazirs in Bannu under Major General Charles Egerton, and in 1904 when the Zazis from Zazi Maidan attacked in force, they were repulsed by a force of Kurram Militia under Lt. Boyle.

During the Third Anglo-Afghan War of 1919 the Afghan General Nadir Khan moved into the Kurram Valley, cutting the Thall to Parachinar road, and induced numbers of Zaimukht and Orakzai to join him. To relieve Thall, a British force advanced from Jalalabad, and Nadir Khan was obliged to withdraw after four days. During the time that the Kurram Militia were cut off, they gave an excellent account of themselves, not only defending the valley, but also occupying vantage points, which later acted as stepping stones for further operations against the Afghans. After their relief, they captured the Afghan post at Amir Thana. The Commander-in-Chief, India, in his dispatches described the conduct of the Kurram Militia as "deserving of highest praise". Members of the Kurram Militia received three awards of the Indian Order of Merit, and one Indian Distinguished Service Medal.

Following the independence of Pakistan the Kurram Militia continued to operate as part of the Frontier Corps. In 1948, a small contingent of volunteers participated in the First Indo-Pakistani War. They initially operated in Jammu and Kashmir, and were later employed in a defensive role in Chakothi. In recognition of their services two awards of the Sitara-e-Jurat were later conferred.

By 1960 the militia numbered 1,928 men. Four companies of Kurram Militia, with supporting arms, were employed during the Indo-Pakistani War of 1965. Six men were killed, eighteen wounded, and one captured. In 1976 a third wing, and in 1984, a fourth, were raised. In February 1988, a fifth wing was raised, bringing the total strength of the militia to 3,460 men. It currently comprises five rifle wings, along with one medium battery of 130 mm and 155 mm guns, a field battery of 25-pounder guns, and a tank troop.

== Commanders ==
- Captain C. M. Dallas (October – December 1892)
- Captain E. W. S. K. Maconchey (December 1892 – May 1894)
- Lieutenant (later Captain) G. O. Roos-Keppel (May 1894 – July 1899)
- Lieutenant S. D. Ketchen (July – December 1899)
- Captain G. L. Carter (December 1899 – January 1903)
- Captain G. F. Fmnis (January 1903 – April 1905)
- Captain G. Ghstie (April 1905 – February 1906)
- Major J. S. Kemball (May 1906 – December 1911)
- Major G. P. Divis (January 1912 – March 1914)
- Captain (later Major) A. C. Tenkock (March 1914 – March 1917)
- Major P. C. R. Dodd (March 1917 – November 1920)
- Major R. H. Wilson (November 1920 – February 1923)
- Major F. C. G. Campbell (February 1923 – December 1925)
- Major A. H. A. Empson (December 1925 – November 1927)
- Major K. G. H. Cates (January 1928 – January 1931)
- Major B. M. Mahon (January 1931 – December 1933)
- Major S. S. Lavendar (January 1934 – January 1937)
- Major G. F. Taylor (January 1937 – April 1941)
- Major R. S. Johnson (April 1941 – February 1943)
- Major (later Lieutenant Colonel) W. D. Francis (March 1943 – May 1946)
- Lieutenant Colonel H. E. Garland (May 1946 – December 1947)
- Lieutenant Colonel E. E. French (December 1947 – June 1949)
- Lieutenant Colonel R. H. Hearne (September 1949 – March 1950)
- Lieutenant Colonel Aziz Uddin (March 1950 – April 1951)
- Lieutenant Colonel Said Ali Khan (January 1951 – November 1953)
- Lieutenant Colonel Sardar Abdul Alam Khan (November 1953 – February 1955)
