= Turi (Pashtun tribe) =

Ethnic group in Afghanistan and Pakistan

توري
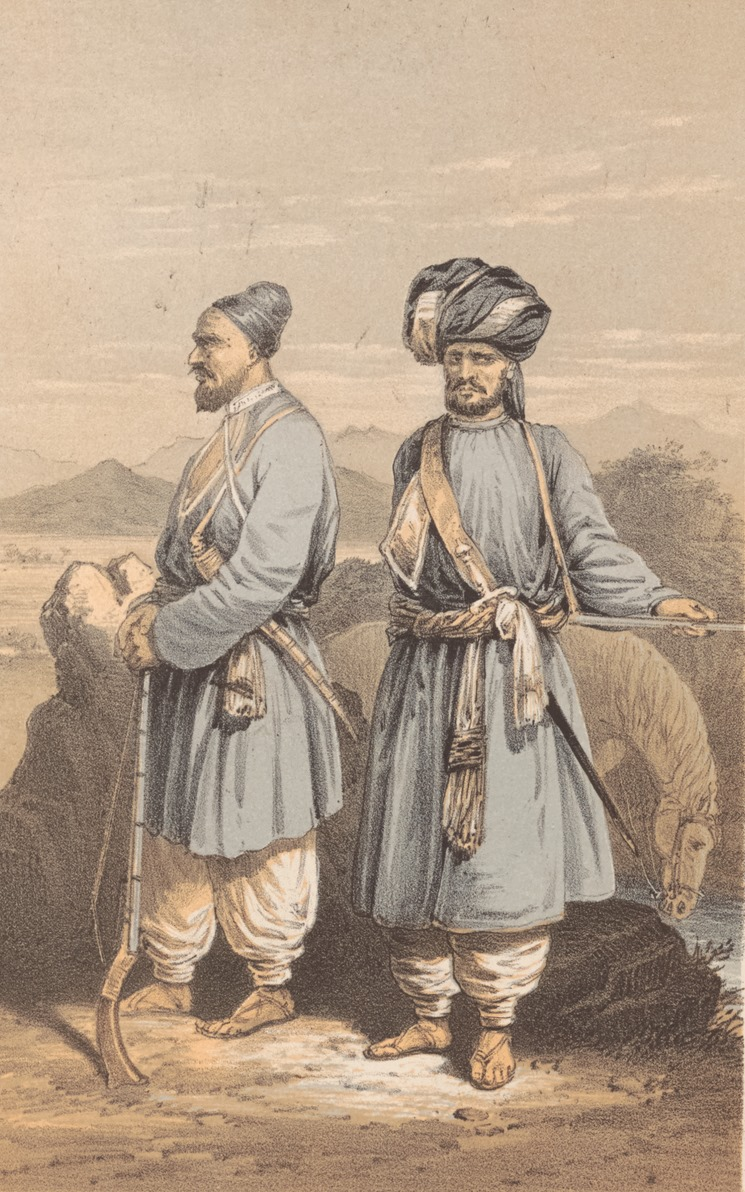
- Armed Pashtun tribesmen of Turi tribe, in Kurram, 1857

Languages
- Pashto

Religion
- Shia Islam

Related ethnic groups
- Mahsud, Zazais · Orakzais · Bannuzais · Khogyani and other Karlani Pashtun tribes.

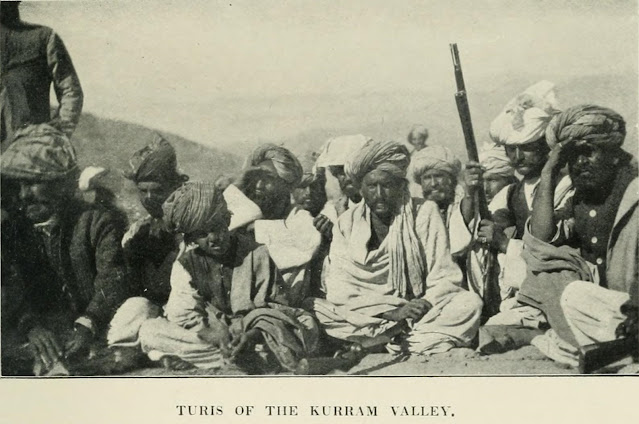
Turi tribesmen in Kurram valley, 1910

The Turi (Pashto: توري) or Torai (تورای) are a Pashtun tribe residing primarily in the Kurram Valley, of Pakistan's Khyber Pakhtunkhwa province, with a smaller population across the Durand line in Afghanistan's Paktia province. They speak Pashto and follow the Twelver Shia sect of Islam. Unlike most Pashtun tribes, who are predominantly Sunni, the Turi's adherence to Shia Islam has historically contributed to tensions with neighbouring Sunni Pashtun tribes, such as the Mangal and Bangash, (Note: albeit whom are considerably Shia [c. 40%]) who also inhabit the Kurram Valley. These tensions are further complicated by land disputes and historical factors.

== History ==
The Turis came into prominence by the end of the 15th century. They used to wander in nomadic fashion between Aryob Valley of Paktia and Kurram Valley. They would migrate in the winter, cross the Kurram Valley which was then inhabited by the Bangash, and travel as far as the Indus River. The Turis appear to have migrated annually during the hot weather back to the Kurram Valley. They then took parts of North Kurram of the Bangash tribe by force and now inhabit Upper Kurram. Today the Bangash tribe can still be found living there in upper Kurram to the subjection of Turis, the Bangash in central and south Kurram are self governed.

The Mughal Emperor Babur mentions the Turis in Kurram in his diary of 1506.

In the 18th century, the Turi and their cousin tribe Zazai came into conflict with the Bangash of the Kurram Valley which was then part of Durrani Empire (Kurram came under the British Raj after the Second Anglo-Afghan War of 1879–80). The Turis succeeded in capturing the Paywar Pass, Shalozan and Malana, pushed the Bangash of the area southeastwards towards central and lower Kurram, and eventually the Turis settled in the upper Kurram Valley.

=== British Indian annexation of Kohat ===
After the annexation of Kohat to British India, the Turis, in league with other clans, repeatedly harassed the Miranzai border, attacking the Bangash and Khattak villages in Kohat. In 1854 they made a treaty, but their raids continued, though punitive measures were not resorted to, as the tribe was held to be under the control of the Amir of Afghanistan.

However their raids increased in audacity, and in 1856 a force under Brigadier-General Neville Bowles Chamberlain entered the valley. Following this, compensation (the payment of which was guaranteed by the governor Ghulam Jan) was exacted, the Turis agreeing to pay 8,630 rupees. In 1859 the Turis joined the British expedition against the Kabul Khel Wazirs, but their feud with that tribe subsequently gave much trouble, with reprisals being undertaken by Wazirs in British territory for Turi offenses. In 1816, serious disturbances arose between the Bangash of Lower Kurram and the British village of Thal out of a boundary dispute. In 1877 the Turis were discontented with the oppressive administration of Shahbaz Khan, governor of Kurram, and when the Amir demanded from them a contribution of 50,000 rupees (a poll tax of 5 rupees on every adult female) and 6,000 recruits for his war against the British, they revolted and fled to the hills.

Attempts to pacify the tribe were unsuccessful for a time, but the Turis at last agreed to send a Jirga (Tribal council) to Kabul and pay a benefaction of 25,000 rupees, while Shahbaz Khan was recalled by the Amir.

In November 1878, a column under General Roberts entered Kurram from Thal, and occupied Kurram Fort on the 25th of that month. Following on from subsequent British conquests the Turis now co-operated with the British expedition against the Zaimukhts, whose hostility had been marked by the murder of Lieutenant Kinloch, and Kurram was held without further disturbance until its evacuation in October, 1880. The Turis throughout furnished supplies, their levies were employed in escorting convoys, and they, with the Bangash, petitioned that the British should take over the valley and free them from Afghan rule; but the British elected to evacuate the country and the tribe was declared independent.

Internal feuds broke out in a few months, and throughout 1882-4 the Turis were constantly fighting among themselves, as well as with the Jajis and Zaimukhts. The administration of the valley was finally undertaken by the British Government, at the request of the Turis themselves, in 1892.

Although their early dealings with the British government were inclined to turbulence, and they were involved in the Miranzai expeditions of 1851 and 1855, the only expedition specially sent against them was the Kurram expedition of 1856. After this they settled down and engaged in trade. During the Second Afghan War they supplied Sir Frederick Roberts with guides and provisions. In 1892 they voluntarily accepted British administration and furnished a large part of the tribal militia in the Kurram Valley.

== Conflict with jihadists and neighboring tribes ==
The Turi have had a long history of conflict with jihadists both from neighbouring Pashtun tribes of the Sunni sect and those of other tribes and ethnic origins who were part of Taliban. These feuds and fights usually last in heavy bloodshed and violence that continues to date

One of the earliest recorded tribal feuds took place during 1884, Turis were constantly fighting amongst themselves as well as other tribes. In 1892, the Turis had requested the British government of the British Raj to take over administration of the Kurram valley, which the Sunni tribes did not appreciate. Kurram has always been at constant conflict and high tensions to this day.

During the Soviet–Afghan War, Sunni Mujahideen attacked the Turis. Kurram was the launching pad for Mujahideen attacks into Afghanistan and the Shias were uncooperative, preventing the Mujahideen from passing through their areas in order to fight in Afghanistan. More recently, the conflict with the Turi has extended to the Taliban and Al Qaeda and Haqqani network supporters in the area. As well as a religious aspect (the Taliban follow the Sunni sect, scornful of Shi'as), the Turi territory is strategically important to cross-border trade and raids into Afghanistan — added to which are Pashtun intertribal tensions. Major battles were fought in 2007 and fighting continues to date.

== Turi sub-tribes ==
The Turis have clans just like other Pashtun tribes. The 5 principal clans are Hamza Khel, Mastu Khel, Ghondi Khel, Alizai and Duparzai. These are grouped into two main group or clans. The Hamza Khel and Mastu Khel are known as Sargullai, whereas the remaining three are called "Chardari". Detail of each division and the area occupied by them are given below:

- Hamza Khel: They are also known as "Kuchis" because they mostly used to be nomadic. They used to migrate to Zarak-i-Kamal and Shobak during the winters. The Hamza Khel has Spinkai, Mallal, Tarakki, Jana Khel, Pari Khel, Sati Khel, Dreplari, Badi Khel, Jaji and Khashki Khel sub-divisions. The Spinkais have Jamal Khel and Adam Khel sections, whereas Tarakkis have Bailkai, Shakar Khel, Saragullai and Aka Khel sections. The Hamza Khel own lands in karman, Shalkhana, Matudai, Mianji (Currently Mali Khel), Taida, Kotkai, Malana and Gorakmor, Nasardin (Mali Khel), Kot Ragha, Serai Mela, Joeri and Tseri hills of the Jajis.
- Mastu Khel: The Mastu Khel are sub-divided into Pirzai Khel, Zakaria Khel, Hussain Khel, Haji Khel, Turka Khel, Biga Khel and Mina Khel. They live in Tezana, Maidanak, Menozai, Badshah, Ahmadzai, Hakim Qala, Karim Qala, Sadara, Tari Kot, Shakar Kot, Baliamin and Jalami.The tribal leader for the sect Mastukhel is Malak Hussain Jan Turi
- Ghondi Khel: The main sub-divisions of the Gondi Khel are Ali Khel, Muhammad Khel, Adin Khel, Kamil Khel and Alam Khel. Hussain Ali Khan khel. The sub-sections of Muhammad Khel are Shamshai Tanai Khel and Nandar Khel. They have occupied the left bank of the Kurram river from Amalkot to Ibrahimzai in the villages of Gharbina, Pewar, Agra, Amalkot, Ramak, Wali Muhammad Qala, Walidad, Sameer, Yakubi, Topaki Charsianukalley and Ibrahimzai. Their Kurram right bank villages are Rana and Maura.
- Alizai: Their three sub-divisions are Mir Hassan, Ahmad Khel and Malik Khel. The Mir Hassan sub-sections are Muhammad Khel and Chago Khel. The main villages of the Alizais are Alizai Lower kurram, Piewar, Habib Qala, Kunj Alizai, Gambir, and Agra.
- Dapparzai: The two sub-divisions of Duparzais are known as Saro Khel and Mirdad Khel. The Saro Khel sub-sections are Daolat Khel, Jafar Khel, Sultan Khel, Shubalan Khel, Baghdadiwar and Megak. The Mirdad Khel sub-sections are Kami Khel, Dreplara, Tar Khel, Lamikot Khel and Kachikana. The Duparzais live in the villages of Paiwar, Jallander, Gosar, Shublan, Bughdi, Alam Sher Qala, Dangila, Shaikh Nur Qala Mathzai, Gidara, Shingak, Burki, Kharlachi and Tangi. It may be worth nothing here that these Turi villages and sub-sections existed in the early years of this century. With the increase of population, many changes have taken place in the people themselves and their settlements.

== Sadaat Families: Turi Perspectives and Relationships ==
The Sadaat families within the Turi Tribe are highly regarded for their descent from the Prophet Muhammad, often playing essential roles in guiding the community with wisdom and spiritual leadership. The bond between the Sadaat and the broader Turi community is characterized by deep mutual respect and support.

== Leadership and Settlement in Kurram ==
Traditional leadership roles within the Turi Tribe, such as Chardai and Sargalah, are crucial for decision-making and maintaining social and religious order. The Turi’s permanent settlement in the Kurram Valley is a testament to their adaptation to the land and agricultural development.

== Notable Turis ==
- Arif Hussain Hussaini
- Sajid Hussain Turi
- Hameed Hussain
- Tehran Turi, former leader of the Zainabiyoun Brigade

== See also ==
- Pashtun Culture
