= Jaji =

Jaji may refer to:

== Places ==
- Jaji, Nigeria, a community in Nigeria that is the location of a Military Staff College
- Jaji, Venezuela, a planned village in the Campo Elías Municipality in the Andes
- Jaji Maydan, a village and the center of Jaji Maidan District of Afghanistan
- Jaji District, in Paktia Province, Afghanistan
- Jaji Maidan District in the Khost District of Afghanistan
- Jajî, the Kurdish name for Van herbed cheese

== Other ==
- Zazi or Jaji, a Pashtun tribe in Pakistan and Afghanistan
- Battle of Jaji, in May 1987, where Soviet forces withdrawing from Afghanistan fought against the Mujahideen
- Folashade Sherifat Jaji (born 1957), Nigerian civil servant
