= Bangash =

Pashtun tribe

بنګښ
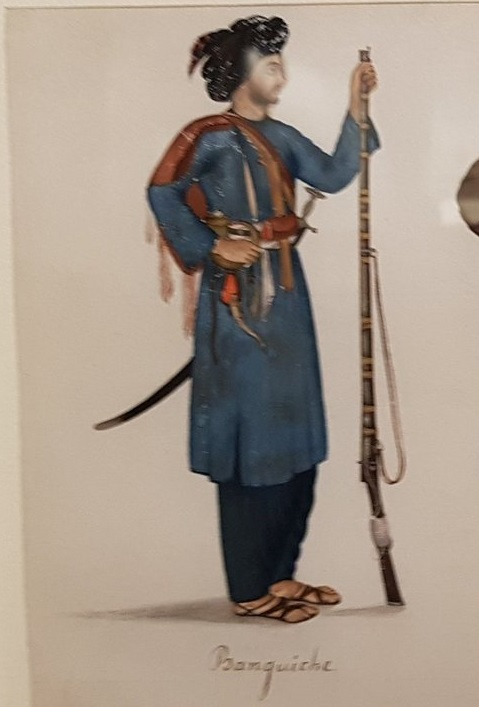
- Illustration of a Bangash tribesman, 1847

Total population
- ~ 840,000

Regions with significant populations
- Pakistan: ~800,000
- Afghanistan: ~40,000

Languages
- Pashto

Religion
- Sunni Islam; Shia Islam

Related ethnic groups
- Afridi · Orakzai · Bannuzai · Wazir · Mehsud and other Karlani Pashtun tribes

The Bangash, Bungish, Bangaš or Bangakh (Pashto: بنګښ) are a tribe of Pashtuns, inhabiting their traditional homeland, the Bangash district which stretches from Kohat to Tall in Hangu and Spīn Ghar, Kurram in Khyber Pakhtunkhwa, Pakistan. They also live as a smaller population in Dera Ismail Khel, Bannu while also a smaller population of Bangash inhabit mainly Gardez, Paktia and around the Lōya Paktia region of Afghanistan.

== Genealogy ==
According to a narrative, the Bangash tribe descended from a man named Ismail, who is described as a governor of Multan whose 11th-generation ancestor was Khalid ibn al-Walid, the famous Arab commander of the Islamic prophet Muhammad. According to the legend, Ismail moved from Multan to settle in Gardez, Paktia, while his wife was from Farmul in Urgun, Paktika. Ismail had two sons, Gār and Sāmil, who were the progenitors of the modern Gari and Samilzai clans of the Bangash, respectively.

== Etymology ==
According to a popular folk etymology, the name Bangash, Bungish or Bangakh is derived from bon-kash (بن‌کش), which is Persian for "root drawer" or "root destroyer," implying that during battles, the Bangash would not rest until they destroy the opponent.

== History ==
During the early modern period, the Bangash homeland was known as "Bangash district and was ruled by the Khan Of Hangu since 1540 which is well documented " Babur, a Timurid (and later Mughal) ruler from Fergana (in present-day Uzbekistan) who captured Kabul in 1504, described Bangash district in his Baburnama as one of the 14 tūmān of Kabul province.

=== Timurid raids ===
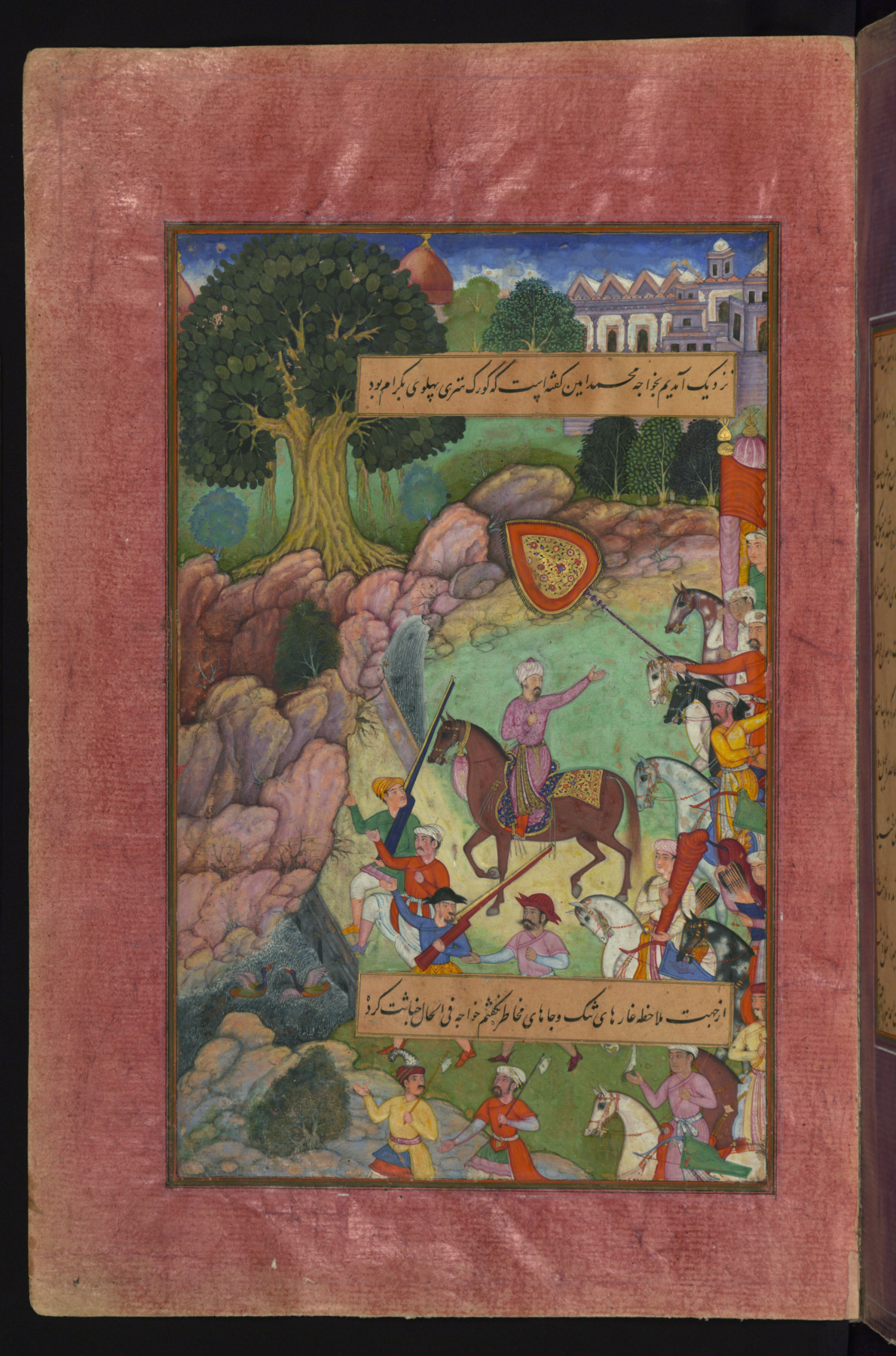
Babur attacking Kohat in 1505

In 1505, after plundering Kohat for two days, Babur's Timurid army marched southwest to raid Bangash district. As they reached a valley surrounded by mountains between Kohat and Hangu, the Bangash Pashtuns occupied the hills on both sides, surrounding the army. However, the Timurids successfully pushed the Pashtuns down towards a nearby detached hill, after which the Timurids surrounded them from all sides and got hold of them. About 100 to 200 Pashtuns were taken during the attack.

On the next day, Babur reached Hangu, where the Bangash Pashtuns had fortified a sangar on the top of a hill. The Timurid army immediately captured it and beheaded about 100 to 200 more Pashtuns, setting up another tower of heads. From Hangu, the Timurid army marched to Tall. The soldiers set out to plunder the Bangash Pashtuns of the neighborhood. Afterwards, the Timurids marched from Bangash to Bannu on the Kurram River, where they set up their third pillar of severed heads.

=== Roshani movement ===
In the second half of the 16th century, the Bangash tribe joined the Roshani movement of Pir Roshan, an ethnic Ormur, who migrated with his family and few of his disciples from Waziristan to Tirah. The Roshanis rebelled against the Mughal emperor Akbar, who constantly sent punitive expeditions to crush the movement. After Pir Roshan's death, the movement was led by his youngest son Pir Jalala. In 1587, Akbar sent a strong Mughal force against him to the Bangash region. In 1599, Pir Jalala took Ghazni but it was quickly recovered by the Mughals. Pir Jalala was succeeded by his nephew Ahdad, who set up a base in Charkh, Logar, and attacked Mughal-held Kabul and Jalalabad several times between 1611 and 1615, but was unsuccessful. In 1626, Ahdad died during a Mughal attack in Tirah. In 1630, when Pir Roshan's great-grandson, Abdul Qadir, launched attacks on the Mughal army in Peshawar, thousands of Pashtuns from the Bangash, Afridi, Mohmand, Kheshgi, Yusufzai, and other tribes took part. The Roshanis failed in the attack, but continued their resistance against the Mughals throughout the 17th century.

Khwaja Muhammad Bangash, who belonged to the Bangash tribe, was a famous 17th-century Pashto Sufi poet and mystic associated with the Roshani movement.

=== Karrani dynasty of Bengal ===
The Karrani dynasty was founded in 1564 by Taj Khan Karrani, a Karlani Pashtun hailing from the Kurram valley in Bangash district. It was the last dynasty to rule the Bengal Sultanate. Taj Khan Karrani was formerly an employee of the Sur Pashtun emperor, Sher Shah Suri. His capital was at Gaur (in present-day Malda district, West Bengal, India). He was succeeded by his brother Sulaiman Khan Karrani, who shifted the capital from Gaur to Tandah (also in Malda district) in 1565. In 1568, Sulaiman Khan annexed Orissa to the Karrani sultanate. Sulaiman Khan's authority extended from Cooch Behar to Puri, and from Son River to Brahmaputra River.

On 25 September 1574, the Mughal Empire captured the Karrani capital Tandah. The Battle of Tukaroi fought on 3 March 1575 forced Daud Khan Karrani, the last Karrani ruler, to withdraw to Orissa. The battle led to the Treaty of Katak in which Daud ceded the whole of Bengal and Bihar, retaining only Orissa. Daud Khan, however, later invaded Bengal, declaring independence from Mughal emperor Akbar. The Mughal onslaught against the Karrani sultanate ended with the Battle of Rajmahal on 12 July 1576, during which Daud Khan was captured and later executed by the Mughals. However, the Pashtuns and the local landlords known as Baro Bhuyans led by Isa Khan continued to resist the Mughal invasion. Later in 1612 during the reign of Jahangir, Bengal was finally integrated as a Mughal province.

=== Bangash state of Farrukhabad ===
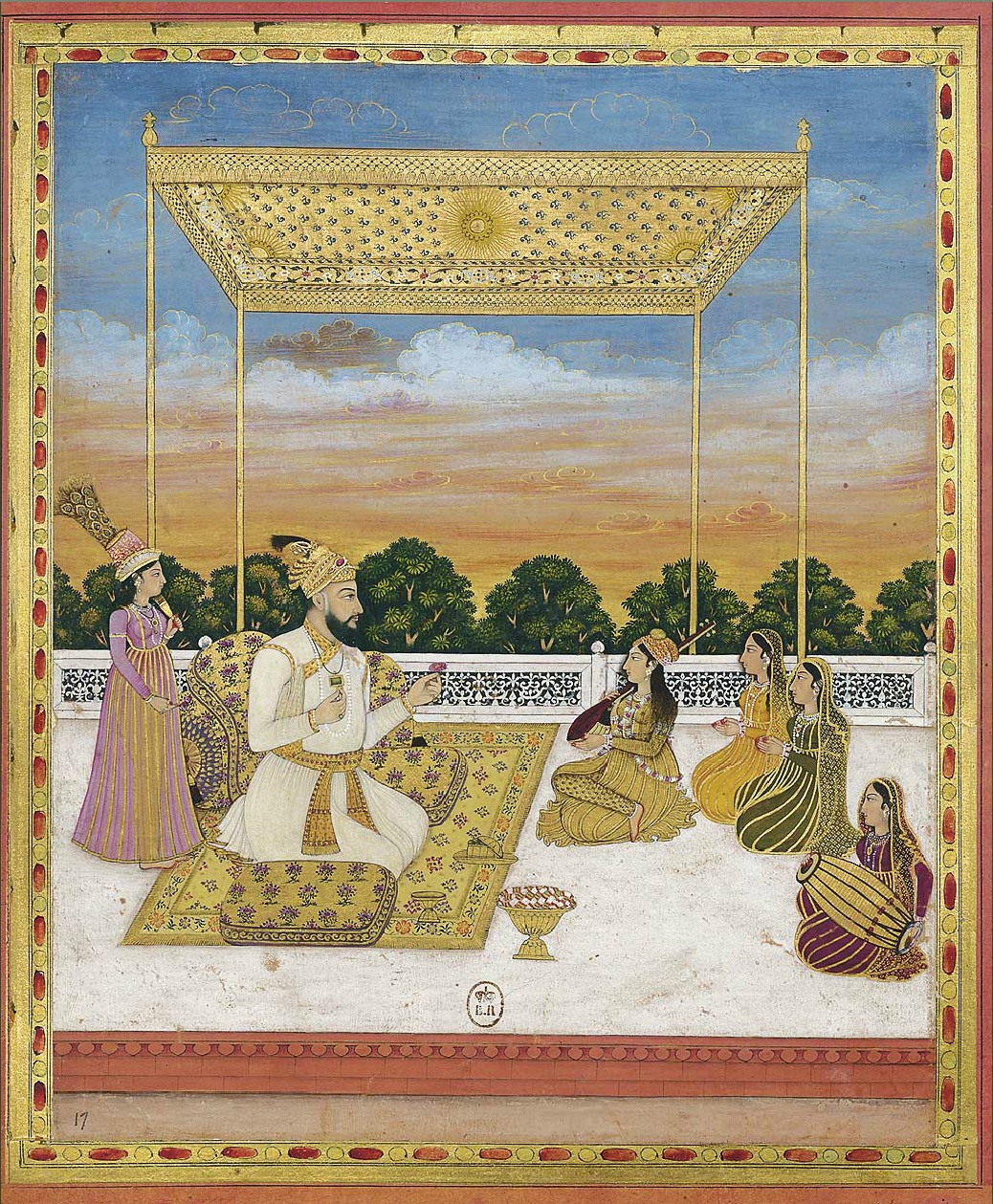
Muhammad Khan Bangash (1713–1743), the first Nawab of Farrukhabad, Uttar Pradesh, India

Muhammad Khan Bangash, who belonged to the Kaghazai line of Bangash tribe, became the first Nawab of Farrukhabad in 1713 in Uttar Pradesh, India. Being illiterate, he was unable to understand a single word of Persian, Turki or Pashto. He named the city after then Mughal emperor Farrukhsiyar. The Bangash Nawabs encouraged merchants and bankers to come and settle in Farrukhabad for the promotion of commercial activities. Very important in this respect was the establishment of the Farrukhabad mint, which apart from being an emblem of sovereignty, stimulated bullion imports and attracted numerous bankers to work in the city. The superior quality of the Farrukhabad currency, both gold and silver, was well known in the eighteenth century as it became the most trustworthy and hardest currency of northern India.

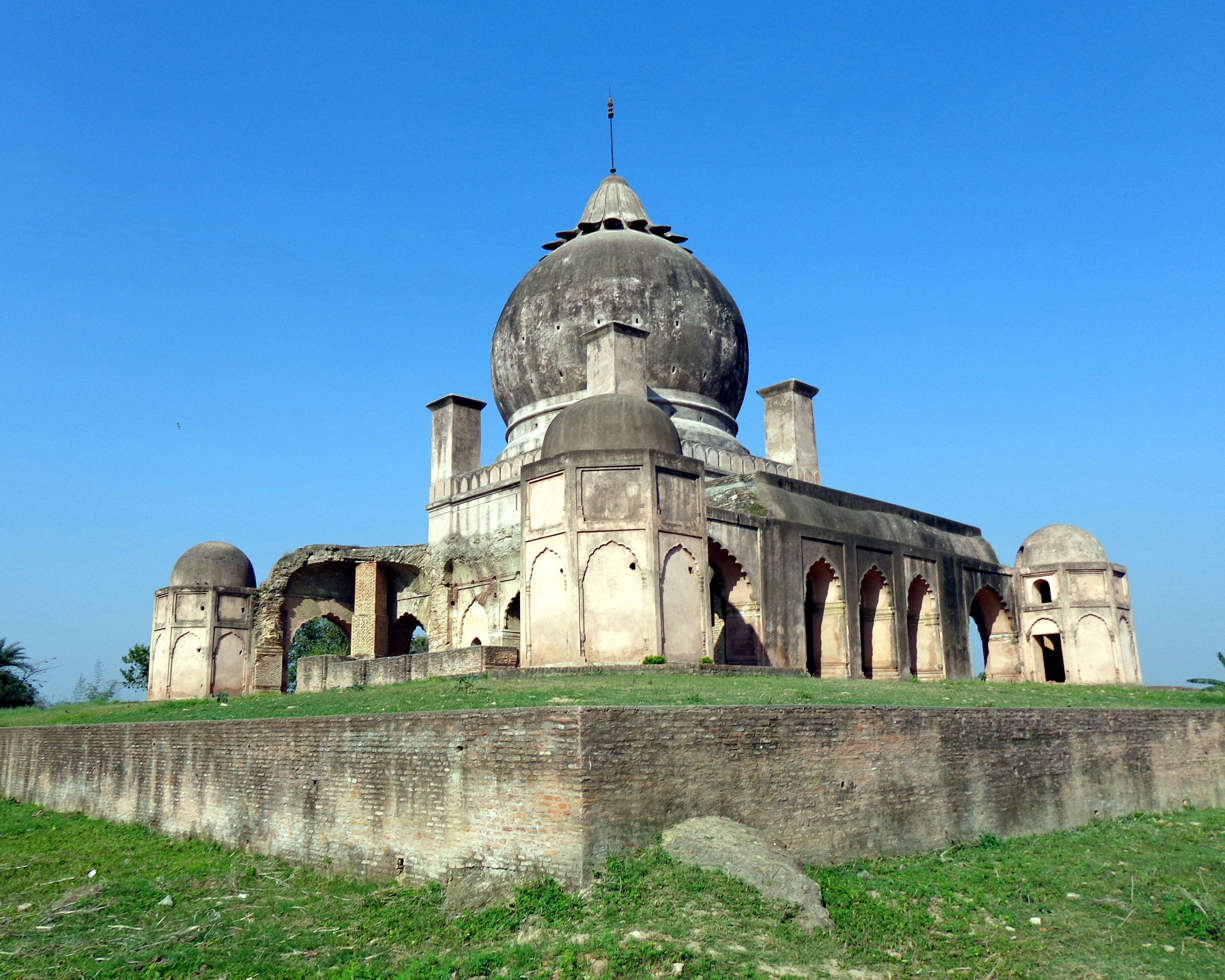
The Tomb of Nawāb Muḥammad Khān Bangāsh in Farrukhabad

Ahmad Shah Durrani (1747–1772), the founder of the Afghan Durrani Empire, preferred coins made at the Farrukhabad mint. The third Nawab of Farrukhabad, Ahmad Khan Bangash, took part in the Third Battle of Panipat in 1761 and supported Ahmad Shah Durrani to defeat the Marathas. Ahmad Khan practised the Utara, a peculiarity of Indian Muslim horsemen, which was the act of dismounting and fighting on foot in times of crisis, which the Hindustanis such as the Sadaat-e-Bara considered to be proof of exceptional bravery, something ridiculed by the Persian counterparts. Because of its reputation as a centre of commerce and finance, Farrukhabad began to attract new Pashtun immigrants from Afghanistan. However, Bangash-held Farrukhabad suffered from a steep economic and political decline under the British Company Raj, because the British colonial officers ordered to close the famed Farrukhabad mint and halt the bullion trade in 1824 as part of their policy to centralize the economy of India. The abolition of the mint dealt a heavy blow to the thriving grain trade and precipitated a monetary crisis in the urban and rural areas of the region. The Bangash Nawabs continued to rule Farrukhabad until they were defeated by the British at Kannauj on 23 October 1857 during the War of Independence. Today, many Bangash are settled in Uttar Pradesh, most notably in Farrukhabad.

=== Bhopal State ===
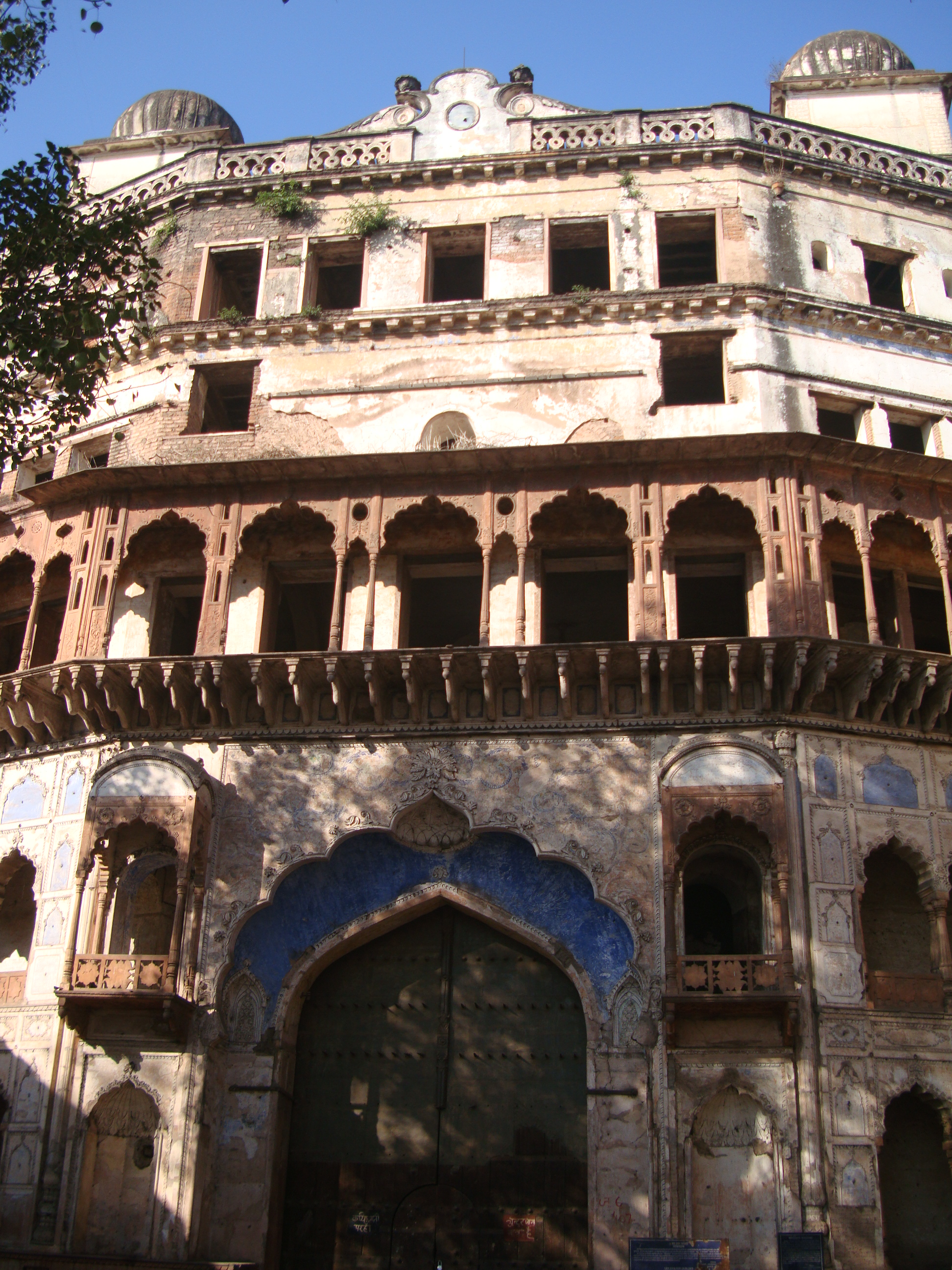
The Taj Mahal palace at Bhopal, built by Shah Jahan Begum (1868–1901)

The Orakzai tribe is historically closely related to the Bangash; their traditional homeland (Orakzai District) was part of Bangash district. In 1723, Dost Mohammad Khan, who belonged to the Orakzai tribe and was formerly a mercenary in the Mughal army, founded the Bhopal State in the present-day Madhya Pradesh state of central India. After his death in 1728, his descendants, the Nawabs of Bhopal, continued ruling the state. Between 1819 and 1926, the state was ruled by four women – the Nawab Begums – unique in the royalty of those days. The third Nawab Begum of Bhopal, Shah Jahan Begum (1868–1901), built the Taj Mahal palace at Bhopal as her residence.

Hamidullah Khan, the last sovereign Nawab of the dynasty, officially acceded the state to India in 1949.

== Pashto dialect ==
The Bangash speak a northern or "harder" variant of Pashto similar to that of the Afridi dialect and the Bangash of Kurram speak similar to of the Mangal Pashtuns, but slightly differing in some lexicographical and phonetic features.

== Religion ==
The Bangash follow the religion of Islam, split almost evenly between Twelver Shia Muslims and Hanafi Sunni Muslims. The Bangash, along with the closely related Orakzais and Turis, are the only Pashtun tribes with Shia populations. The Shia Bangash are more concentrated around Upper Kurram and certain areas of Hangu in areas like Usterzai, while the Sunni Bangash are more concentrated around Lower Kurram Central Kurram as well as Thall and Bannu.

== Demographics ==
The Bangash are primarily found in Pakistan, with a sizeable population also found in Afghanistan. The Bangash Pashtuns can be found all over Pakistan but majority reside in the cities of Kohat and Hangu in Khyber Pakhtunkhwa, as well as the Kurram Valley and Peshawar. In Afghanistan, they will be found in the districts that make up the historic "Loya Paktia" region, including Paktia, Paktika, and Khost. Between both Pakistan and Afghanistan, there are around 800,000 Bangash Pashtuns, with around 780,000 in Pakistan alone.

Descendants of Bangash are found in India as well but are rather than being referred to as "Pashtuns", they are known as Pathans. Instead of speaking Pashto, the Bangash Pathans of India speak either Hindi or Urdu. They are mostly found in Uttar Pradesh and mostly in the cities of Farrukhabad, Lucknow, and Gorakhpur. The descendants of the first Nawab of Farrukhabad, Muhammad Khan Bangash, have also been found in cities as far as Allahabad and Varanasi. Other Bangash descendants in India are also present in Bihar. There are around 30,000 descendants of Bangash in India but other researchers give estimates of around 70,000. Just like in Pakistan and Afghanistan, the Bangash Pathans in India prefer to marry within their own tribe, or marry with other Pathans.

Despite the Karrani dynasty and its rule in modern-day Bangladesh, there are very little number of descendants of Bangash in the country. This is because unlike in Pakistan and Afghanistan, the descendants of Bangash have mixed with the local population. The Bangash descent Pathans of Bangladesh are Muhajirs that migrated from Uttar Pradesh and Bihar to East Pakistan.

== Notable Bangash ==
- Malak Daulat Khan, first ruler of Kohat
- Malak Behzad Khan, ruler of Kohat
- Ghulam Ishaq Khan, President of Pakistan 1988–1993
- Afzal Bangash, Pashtun politician
- Muhammad Khan Bangash, Nawab of Farrukhabad
- Ahmad Khan Bangash, Nawab of Farrukhabad
- Aitzaz Hasan Bangash, Pakistani who died stopping a suicide bomber
- Abdul Nabi Bangash, politician
- Haji Saifullah Khan Bangash, politician
- Shahzad Khan Bangash, politician
- Shah Abu Tarab Khan Bangash, politician
- Saifullah Bangash, Pakistani cricketer
- Arif Bangash, Pakistani general and politician
- Ali Haidar Khan VC, a British soldier World War II)
