= Tanai =

Pashtun tribe

Tanai تڼی
- Ethnicity: Pashtun
- Location: Afghanistan, Waziristan
- Parent tribe: Karlani
- Branches: Darnoohee, Sitkai, Aryozi, Khabkhel
- Language: Pashto
- Religion: Islam

The Tanai (Pashto: تڼی) or Tani (تڼی) are a Pashtun tribe that are located on the border of Paktia Province, Khost Province in Afghanistan and Miranshah, the capital of the northern district of the Waziristan region in the Khyber Pakhtunkhwa province of Pakistan.

== Description ==
The Tanai are described as “spirited, brave” and “having a spirit of Afghan honour”. They are an inconspicuous tribe in the history of the region. In dress, they mostly resemble the Dawari, while some others are with a long woolen garment of stripped cotton. Those in the hills traditionally maintain their large rural herding practices.

== Subtribes ==
The four sub-tribes of the Tanai are:

- Darnoohee
- Sitkai
- Aryozee
- Khaabkhil

== Notable Tanai Pashtuns ==
- Lt. Gen. Shahnawaz Tanai, Afghan Army General of the Soviet-Afghan War, Defence Minister and led coup during the civil war
