= Nawab of Sarhad =

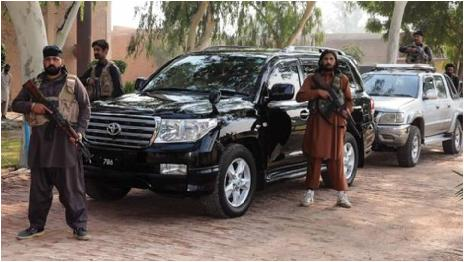
Grand Son Nawabzada Fahad Khan I of Nawabzada Dr Sher Bahadar Khan's Protocol

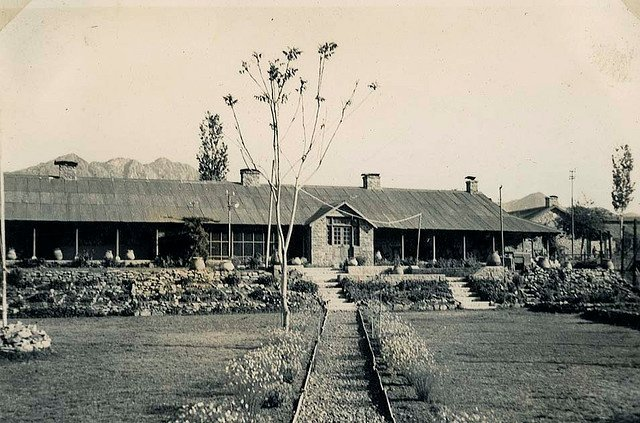
Residence

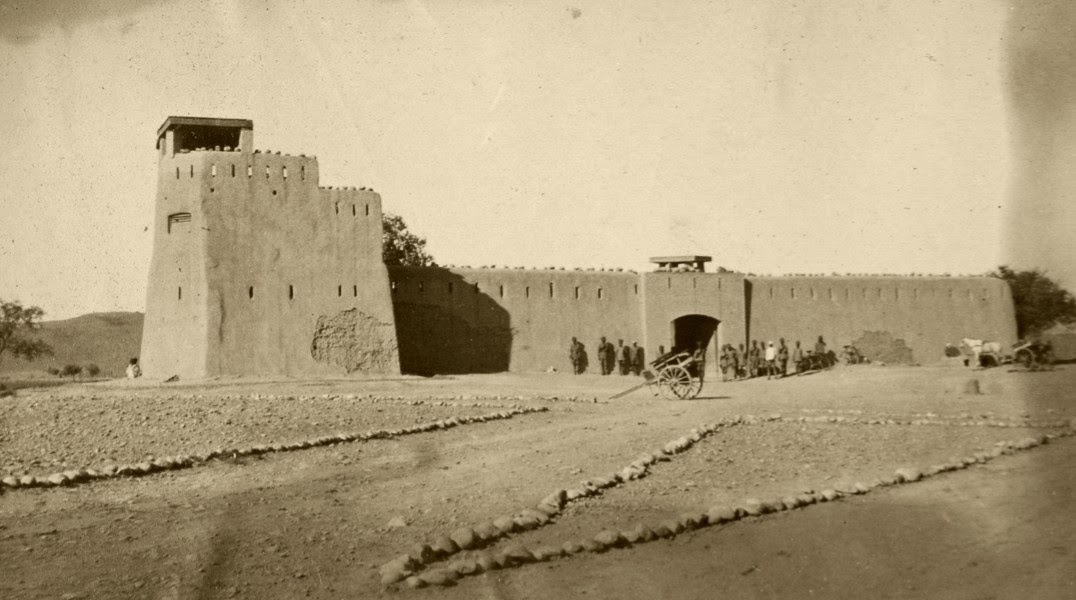
Nawabs Fort

The term Nawab of Sarhad refers to the lineage of rulers of the princely state of Dawar North Wazirs and some other cities in Pakistan, but most commonly refers to the 6th nawab Gulmaizar Khan Nawab Gulmaizar Khan was lord and prince from Dawar Family and later known for his strongest army against British Raj in Subah Sarhad (Sarhad Province). The 6th nawab, was given Awardly name of General by British Lord. He also spread the new education system, also he was given the name The Protector by British Empire. Nawabzada Sher Bahadar Khan, son of the 6th nawab, was made the successive nawab in 1951.

A nawab was originally the provincial governor or viceroy of a province or region of the Mughal Empire. Since most of the Muslim rulers of the subcontinent had accepted the authority of the Mughals, the term nawab is generally understood to mean any Muslim ruler in the Indian subcontinent. Under British rule, nawabs ruled several princely states including Sarhad.

However the title is also much used as a prefix (similar to lord in English peerage) by Muslim aristocrats or landed gentry in the subcontinent prior to Independence of Pakistan.
