= Diler Himmat Khan =

Nawab Muzaffar-Jang Diler Himmat Khan
- Nawab of Farrukhabad; Muzaffar Jang
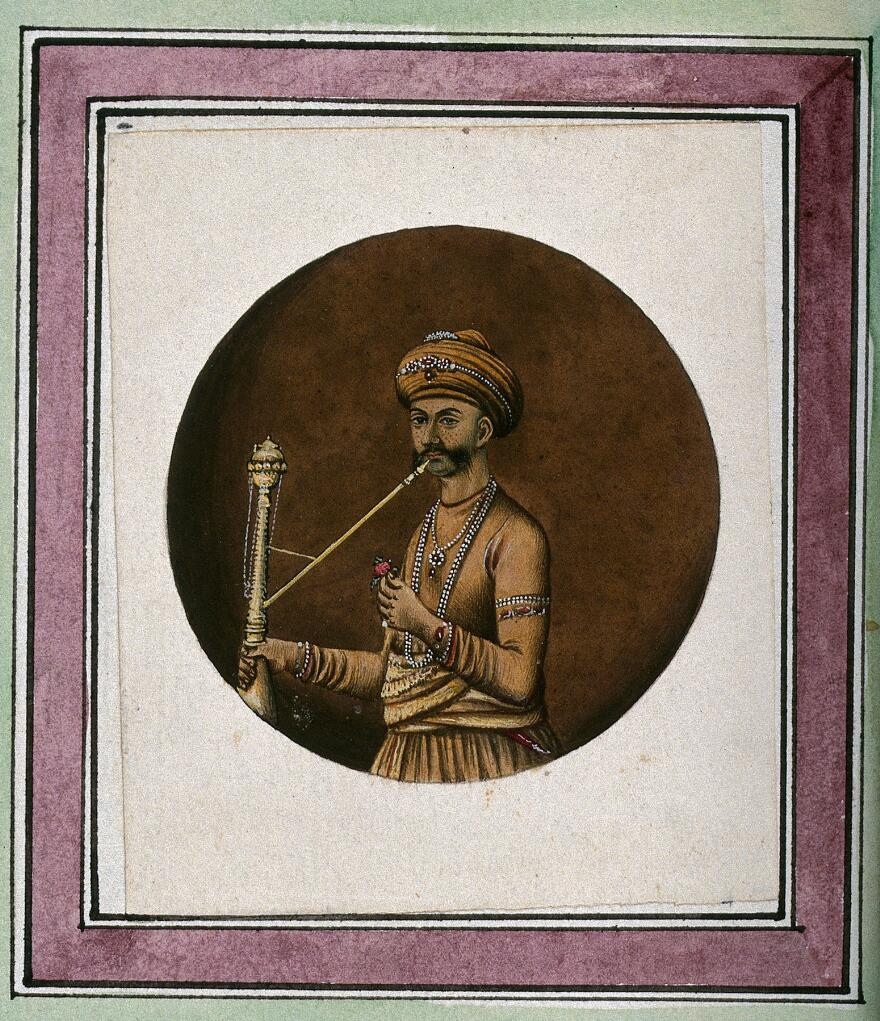
- The Nawāb of Farrukhabad, Muzaffar Jang, smoking a hookah

Nawab of Farrukhabad
- Reign: 1771-1796
- Predecessor: Ahmad Khan Bangash
- Successor: Imdad Hussain Khan Bangash
- Born: Diler Himmat Khan; September 1757 - September 1758
- Died: 22 October 1796
- Issue: Rustam Ali Khan Bangash, Imdad Hussain Khan, seven daughters (see Issue)
- House: Bangash
- Father: Ahmad Khan Bangash
- Religion: Islam

Nawab Diler Himmat Khan, commonly known by his regnal name Muzaffar Jang (1771–1796) was the fourth Nawab or ruler of Farrukhabad, a kingdom in early-modern India. He succeeded his father Ahmad Khan Bangash as the ruler in 1771.

== Early life and background ==
Diler Himmat Khan was born to Nawab Ahmad Khan Bangash and his fourth wife, Khair-un-nissa in September 1757 - September 1758. His father was a leading noble in the Mughal Empire and ruled Farrukhabad as his ancestral domain. Diler Himmat Khan's mother, Khair-un-nissa was the adopted daughter of Yakut Khan, one of Ahmad Khan's salves and reportedly a descendant of Khan Jahan Khan Lodi, the principal Afghan noble during the reign of Mughal emperor Shah Jahan. Diler's birth was much rejoiced at and he was given the title of Muzaffar Jang by his father.

== Reign ==
On his father's death in 1771, Diler Himmat Khan succeeded him as the Nawab of Farrukhabad. Early in his reign, he was forced to seek the aid of the ruler of Awadh, Shuja-ud-Daula in 1773 to expel the Marathas who had attacked Farrukhabad. According to a "Hamilton", this Maratha army was actually a small raiding party. Hamilton held Muzaffar Jang in low opinion, stating him to be a weak and ignorant young man. However, he became a tributary of Awadh in 1774 after the First Rohilla War. The British Governor-General of India, Lord Cornwallis considered Muzaffar Jang to be "either a madman or an idiot". Muzaffar Jang died on 22 October 1796, allegedly poisoned by his eldest son Rustam Ali Khan.

== Issue ==
Diler Himmat Khan had four consorts. He had nine children, of whom two were sons and seven were daughters. They are as follows in chronological order-

- Rustam Ali Khan, eldest son who allegedly poisoned Diler Himmat Khan
- Imdad Hussain Khan, regnal name Nasir Jung, died 1st of February, 1813
- Umdah Begum, married to Himmat Bahadur
- Fazl-un-nissa, married to Muhammad Ali Khan, eldest son of Dil Daler Khan, son of Ahmad Khan Bangash
- Najib-un-nissa, married to Ahmad Ali Khan, second son of Dil Daler Khan. She died on 22nd of October, 1864.
- Nawab Begum, married to Hussain Ali Khan, son of Amin-ud-Daula. She died on 23rd of May, 1817.
- Amir Begum, married to Hasan Ali Khan, another son of Amin-ud-Daula. She died on 17th of August, 1842.
- Nadir Jahan Begum
- Unnamed daughter, married to Burhan Ali Khan
