= Muhammad Khan Bangash =

- Nawab of Farrukhabad; Nawab of Allahabad; Nawab of Malwa; Subahdar of Assam Sardar Ghazanfar Jang
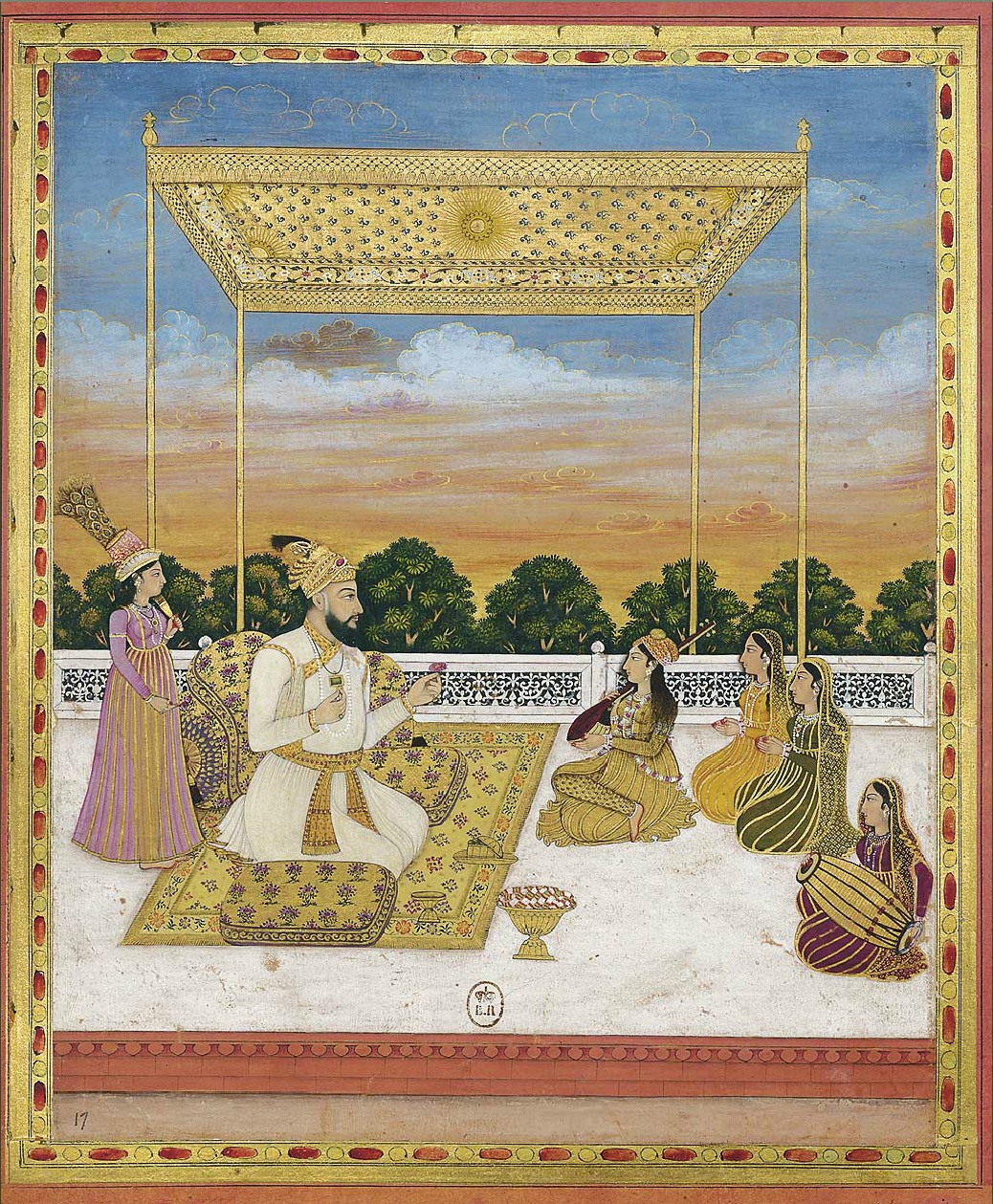
- Portrait of Muhammad Khan Bangash c. 1730 Bibliothèque nationale de France

Nawab of Farrukhabad
- Reign: 1713 – December 1743
- Predecessor: Position established
- Successor: Nawab Qaim Khan Bangash

Nawab of Allahabad
- Reign: 1725 – August 1729; 1735–1736
- Predecessor: Sarbuland Khan
- Successor: Sarbuland Khan

Nawab of Malwa
- Reign: 26 January 1731 – 25 October 1732
- Predecessor: Rai Girdhar Bahadur
- Successor: Jai Singh of Amber
- Born: Muhammad Khan; 1665
- Died: December 1743 (aged 77–78)
- Issue: see below
- House: Bangash
- Father: Arhan Khan Bangash
- Religion: Islam
- Occupation: Mughal Ispahsalar

Nawab "Ghazanfar-Jang" Bangash Khan (1665 – December 1743) was the first Nawab of Farrukhabad in Uttar Pradesh, India. He was a "Bawan Hazari Sardar" (Commander of 52,000 men strong force) in the Mughal Army. He served as governor of Malwa and Allahabad provinces of the Mughal Empire. He was also viceroy of Assam from 1735 to 1743. Although regarded as rude and illiterate, not understanding a single word of Persian or Pashto, he was well regarded for his loyalty, and it is believed that had fortune sided with him he would have been able to establish a kingdom rivalling those in the Deccan or Awadh.

== Life ==
The first immigrants to Mau were the descendants of the Khwaja Bayazid Ansari, the ethnic Ormur leader and founder of the Roshaniyya movement who had settled in Mau and Shamsabad. Muhammad Khan's father, Ain Khan Bangash, who belonged Karlani Khaghzai clan of the Pashtun Bangash tribe had migrated from his native lands in the time of Aurangzeb and settled in Mau Rashidabad, gained service under the descendants of the Ansaris, married in Mau and had left two sons. His son, Muhammad Khan, gained a reputation as one of the most powerful of the Indo-Afghan mercenaries who inhabited that part of Hindustan, and eventually came to establish the territories that were consolidated into the state of Farrukhabad. He was rewarded the jagir of Farrukhabad area and part of Bundelkhand. In India they were referred to as qaum-i-bangash which became a wider and more diffused label.

Being few in number, the bulk of Muhammad Khan's soldiers were elite slaves known as 'disciples', who played a significant role as a kind of artificial family in-group attached to their patron. These were primarily former Hindu Rajputs and sometimes Brahmins who were adopted, converted to Islam, given a new name and submitted to a regime of religious, literary and military training which was focused on the transformation of the recruit's identity. Hence the natural sons of Muhammad Khan were to be considered the brothers of the adopted sons, who were referred to as 'atfal-i-sarkar' or children of the state. Before Muhammad Khan's death, the separation between the various tribes and castes broke down, forming a homogenous group, so that Muhammad Khan had founded his own Indian Muslim tribe or caste. To increase his independence from his nobles further, he continued to encourage immigration from the northwest.

The state of Farrukhabad was named after Muhammad Khan's patron the Emperor Farrukhsiyar. In 1713, he was appointed a courtier by Emperor Farrukhsiyar and founded the town of Farrukhabad in 1714. He founded the town of Mohammadabad after his name and the town of Qaimganj after his son Qaim Khan's name. During Saadat Khan's journey to Awadh, he stayed at Farrukhabad. Muhammad Khan Bangash gave him information about the strength, pride and resources of Shaikhzadas (a community which ruled Lucknow). He advised Khan to befriend the sheikhs of Kakori, adversaries of the Shaikhzadas, before entering Lucknow. Bangash became Saadat Khan's closest ally. However, Saadat Khan began to go out of his ways to curry favour with the emperor. This obsession annoyed other nawabs and subahdars. Among them was Bangash himself, who was angry at the latter for backing Chhatrasal and instigating him.

He served in the campaign led by the Sayyid Brothers against the Jat leader Churaman (October 1722 - September 1723) and Ajit Singh of Marwar. In 1730, emperor Muhammad Shah appointed him as the Subahdar of Malwa. However, he was unable to cope with the repeated Maratha incursions and was removed from the post in 1732. He was appointed Subahdar of Allahabad for the admirable job he did against Chhatrasal the first time. On account of his failure in Bundelkhand against Chhatrasal the second time, he was removed from the governorship of Allahabad as well.

At his death his dominions included the entire Doab from Koil in the North, to Kora in the South, including all of Farrukhabad and parts of Cawnpore, Shahjahanpur, Budaun and Aligarh. His brother Himmat Khan Bangash was the father of Nawab Murtaza Khan of Jahangirabad, and the grandfather of the Urdu poet Nawab Mustafa Khan Shefta.

=== Later Mughal-Maratha Wars ===
In Bundelkhand, Chhatrasal had rebelled against the Mughal Empire and established an independent kingdom. In December 1728, a Mughal force led by the distinguished commander Muhammad Khan Bangash attacked him, and besieged his fort with his family. Chhatrasal had sought Peshwa Bajirao I's assistance, but the latter was busy in Malwa at that time.

In March 1729, the Peshwa Baji Rao I finally responded to Chhatrasal's request and marched towards Bundelkhand. Chhatrasal also escaped his captivity and joined the Maratha forces. After they marched to Jaitpur, as a result Bangash was defeated in the battle and retreat from Bundelkhand. Chhatrasal's position as the ruler of Bundelkhand was restored.

== Personality ==
Muhammad Khan Bangash was illiterate and could not understand a single word of Persian due to which he had to be accompanied by one of his sons. He was also unable to understand either Turki or Pashto. Contemporaries were amazed by the discrepancy between his great wealth & power and his simple personal habits. However, this roughness and general lack of adab could be rather embarrassing, especially during audiences at the imperial Mughal court. His descendants were more fully accommodated to the royal nawabi lifestyle and the etiquette of an Indo-Persian court.

Muhammad Khan practised the Indian custom of Utara, the act of dismounting, tying the tunics together and fighting on foot to the death, a peculiarity of Indian Muslims horsemen of which they were very proud, which William Irvine says specially affected Indians such as the Barha Sayyids. This was something boasted by the Hindustani Muslims to be proof of exceptional courage. He had his soldiers dismount and tie the skirts of their heavy plaited coats (Jamaah) to fight to the death when in crisis.

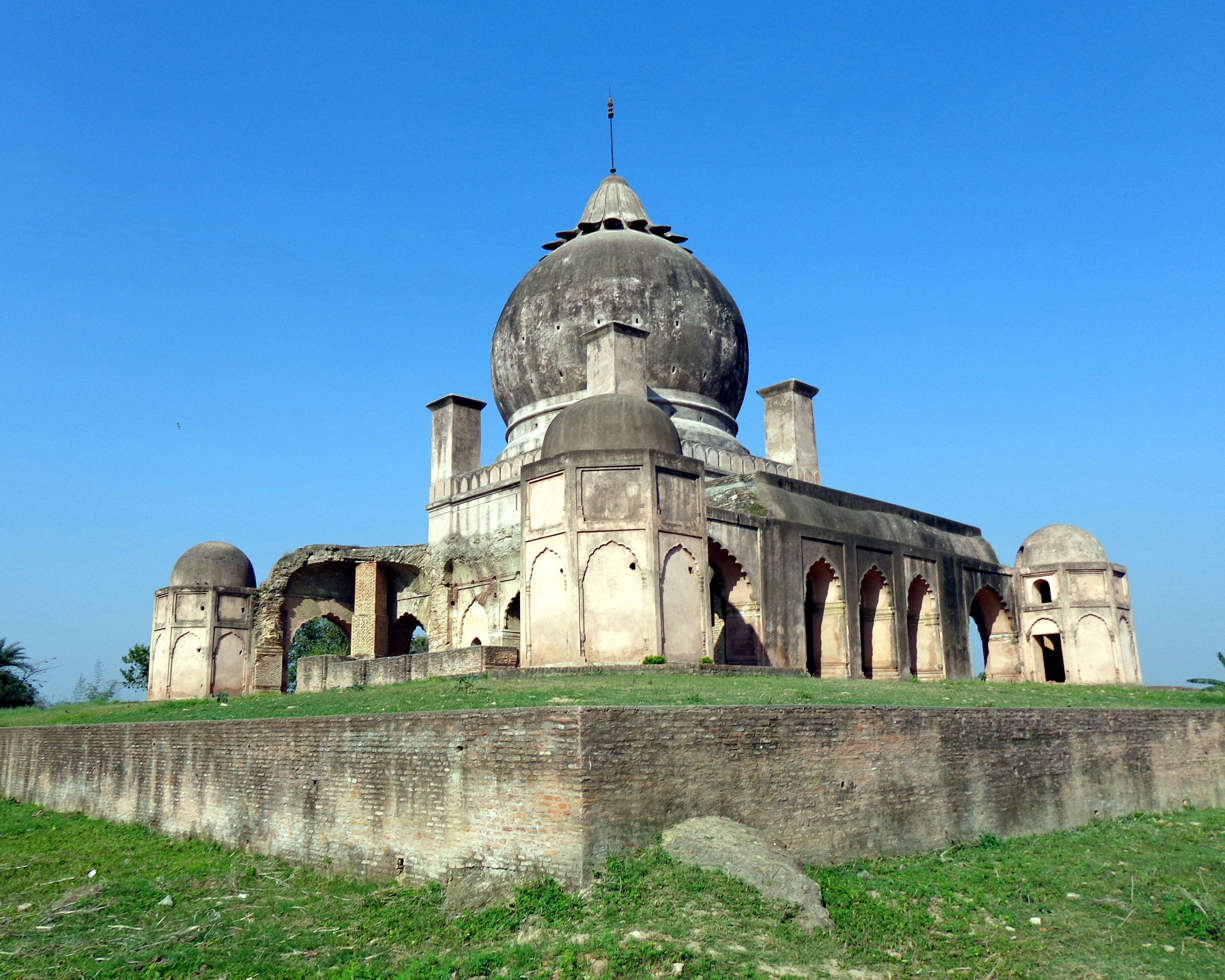
The Tomb of Nawāb Muḥammad Khān Bangāsh in Farrukhabad

== Succession ==
Muhammad Khan Bangash was succeeded by his eldest son Qaim Khan in 1743. Qaim Khan was later succeeded by Ahmad Khan Bangash, his younger brother and Muhammad Khan Bangash's second son.

== Family ==
Muhammad Khan Bangash married Malaha Banu (also known as Rabaha Banu or Bibi Sahiba), daughter of Kasim Khan Bangash. Muhammad Khan had twenty-two sons and at least twenty-two daughters, many of whom married into branches of the Bangash family or other prominent Afghan households.

=== Sons ===
- Kaim Khan- Eldest son by Malaha Banu. Succeeded his father as Nawab of Farrukhabad (1743–1748). He died without issue.
- Ahmad Khan- Succeeded as Nawab in 1750 and ruled until his death in 1770.
- Murid Khan- Killed alongside Kaim Khan; left three sons.
- Murtazza Khan- Executed on the orders of Muzaffar Jang while imprisoned; left seven sons.
- Akbar Khan- Killed at the Battle of Sikandra Rao; left two sons.
- Abd al-Nabi Khan- Killed alongside Kaim Khan; left one son, Abd al-Majid Khan.
- Husain Khan- Executed at Allahabad on the orders of Safdar Jang.
- Fakhr al-Din Khan- Either killed alongside Kaim Khan or executed at Allahabad according to differing accounts; left one daughter.
- Ismail Khan- Executed at Allahabad; left four sons.
- Karim Dad Khan- Executed at Allahabad; left two sons.
- Imam Khan- Nominated by Bibi Sahiba as Kaim Khan's successor and briefly ruled as Nawab before being executed at Allahabad in 1750; left two sons.
- Khuda Bandah (Khudawand) Khan- Died in 1780; held the pargana of Pakrawa through his daughters marriage and left one son, Amin al-Dawla.
- Mansur Ali Khan- Left one daughter.
- Hadidat Khan- Killed alongside Kaim Khan; died without issue.
- Bahadur Khan- Killed alongside Kaim Khan; left two sons.
- Shadi Khan- Killed during the Maratha siege of Fatehgarh in 1751; died without issue.
- Salabat Khan- Alive in 1802; left four sons.
- Manavar Khan- Left six sons.
- Muhammad Amin Khan- Killed by a zamindar after a quarrel; left two sons.
- Ata-ullah Khan- Accidentally shot and killed while tiger hunting by Roshan Khan Bangash.
- Ali Khan- Survived until after the Cession; left ten sons.
- Shaista Khan- Alive in 1802; left one son.

=== Daughters ===
- Bibi Roshan Jahan- Full sister of Kaim Khan; married Roshan Khan Bangash Ustarzai, founded the market town of Roshanabad, and died without issue.
- Unnamed daughter- Full sister of Kaim Khan; died unmarried at about twelve or thirteen years of age.
- Bibi Rahmat al-Nissa- Married Inayat Ali Khan and had two sons, Sultan Ali Khan and Rustam Ali Khan.
- Karim al-Nissa- Married the widowed Inayat Ali Khan after the death of her sister Rahmat al-Nissa and had two sons, Munir Ali Khan and Azim Khan.
- Unnamed daughter- Married her cousin Shujaat Ali Khan; had no sons.
- Bhuri Khanum- Married her cousin Muhammad Ali Khan Bangash and had two sons, Amir Ali Khan and Qutb Ali Khan.
- Begam Sahiba- Married Iradat Ali Khan Bangash; died without issue.
- Bibi Kafiya- Married Rustam Khan Bangash; died without issue.
- Unnamed daughter- Married Mustafa Khan; died without issue.
- Bibi Daulat Khatun- Married Khuda Dad Khan Bangash Ustarzai; was renowned for her charity and became the ancestress of the historian Manavar Ali Khan.
- Asalat Khatun- Married Bangash Khan and was the mother of Wali Muhammad Khan.
- Unnamed daughter- Married Yusuf Khan; died without issue.
- Kamila Khanum- Married Murad Khan (Masalle) Bangash and was the mother of Khairati Khan Bangash.
- Unnamed daughter- Full sister of Karim Dad Khan; married Khan Alam Khan.
- Two unnamed daughters- Full sisters of Bahadur Khan; married Ali Dad Khan and Sardar Khan, respectively.
- Sahib Khatun- Married Johar Khan Bangash.
- Abida Khanum- Married Hurmat Khan Bangash.
- Unnamed daughter- Married Babar Khan.
- Alif Khatun- Married Haq Dad Khan Bangash.
- Ladli Khanum- Married Muhammad Khan.
- Khanum Sahiba- Full sister of Murtazza Khan; died unmarried.
- Nanhi Bibi- Married Baz Khan Bangash.

== Nawabs ==
These were the following Nawabs of Farrukhabad:

- Nawab Muhammad Khan Bangash
- Nawab Qaim-Jang Qaim Khan Qaim-ud-daula
- Nawab Ahmad Khan Bangash (took part in the Third Battle of Panipat in 1761 alongside Ahmad Shah Abdali )
- Nawab Muzaffar-Jang Daler Himmat Khan
- Nawab Nasir-Jang Imdad Hussain Khan
- Nawab Tafazzul Husain Khan

== Bibliography ==
- Srivastava, Ashirbadi Lal (1954), The First Two Nawabs of Awadh, Shiva Lal Agarwal
