= Torka Bazaar =

Torka Bazaar is in upper Surani Bannu, Bannu district, Khyber Pakhtunkhwa, Pakistan.

The town holds a post office, Jamia masjid, markets, and shops. As the location of the tomb of Faizul Ostad, and the site of battles between Faqir Epi, Khalifa Gul Nawaz, Faizul Ostad, and the British Army, Torka Bazaar is a location of historical significance.

Torka Bazaar is known for its tea and halwa, which contribute to a local tourist trade.

The word "Torka", meaning "coal", is derived from the Bannuchi language.
