= Ahmad Khan Bangash =

Nawab of Farrukhabad from 1750 to 1771

Ahmad Khān Bangash
- Nawab of Farrukhabad; Amir-ul-Umara; Mir Bakhshi
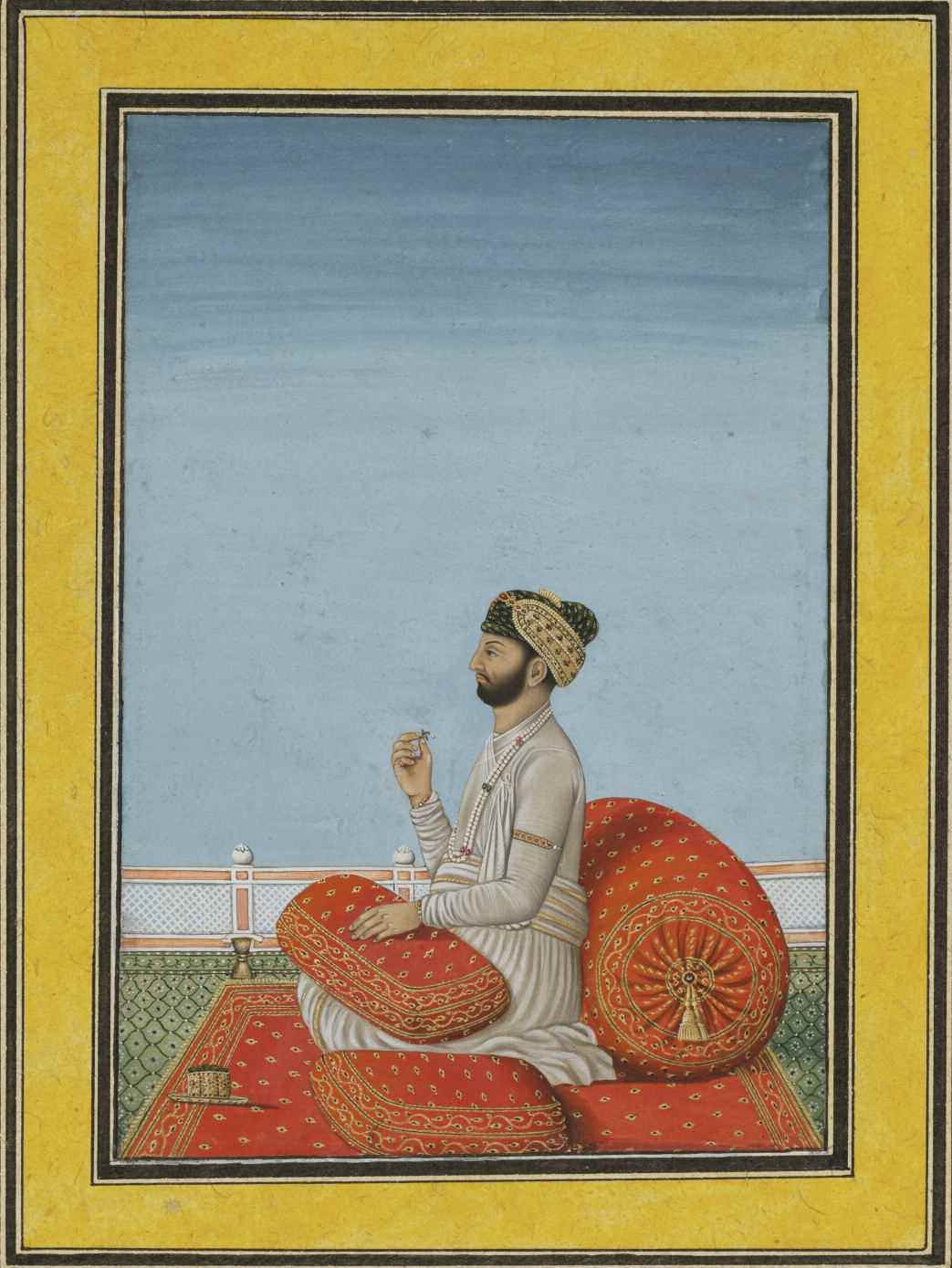
- Nawab Ahmad Khan Bangash of Farrukhabad

Nawab of Farrukhabad
- Reign: 1750–1771
- Predecessor: Nawab Qaim Khan Bangash
- Successor: Diler Himmat Khan
- Born: Ahmad Khan
- Died: 12 July 1771
- Issue: Mahmud Khan Bangash; Diler Himmat Khan; Dil Daler Khan Bangash; Sitara Begum
- House: Bangash
- Father: Muhammad Khan Bangash
- Religion: Islam

Muhammad Ahmad Khan Bahadur Ghalib Jang (Persian: احمد خان بنغاخ) or Ahmad Khan Bangash (Persian: احمد خان بنگش) was a Mughal nobleman and Nawab of Farrukhabad from the Rohilla Afghan Bangash dynasty. He was the second son of Muhammad Khan Bangash, a powerful Mughal nobleman. He took part in the Third Battle of Panipat in 1761 against the Marathas led by Sadashivrao Bhau.

He was a close friend of Imad-ul-Mulk, the infamous Mughal wazir.

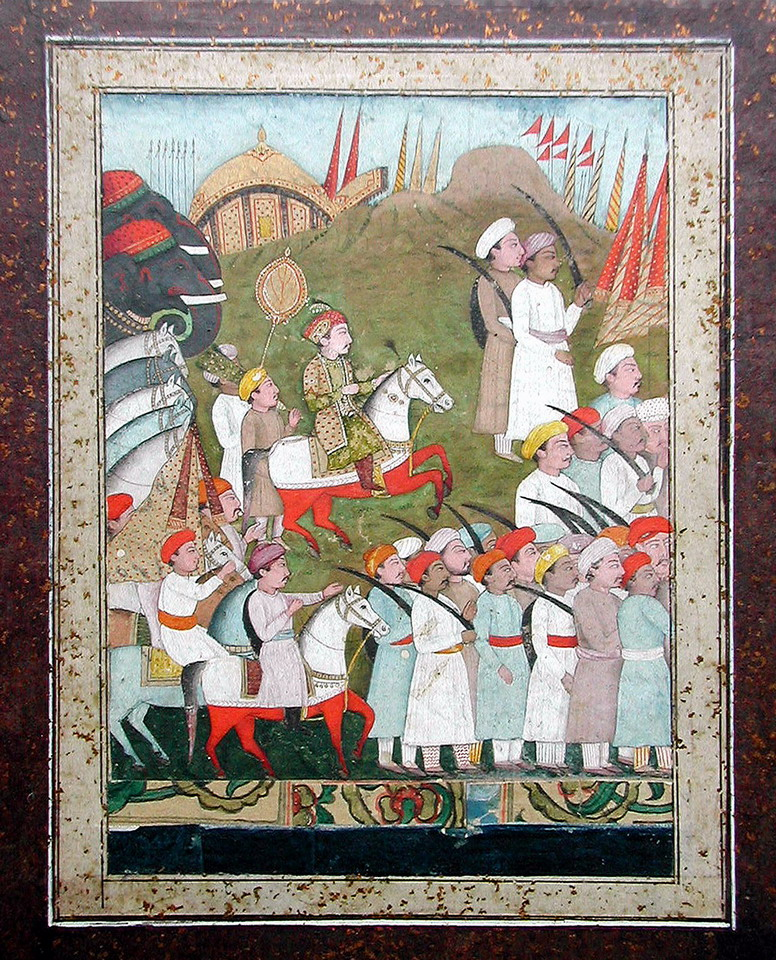
a Painting of Ahmad Khan Bangash at the Third Battle of Panipat

== Early life ==
Ahmad Khan Bangash was the second son of Ghazanfar Jang and the younger brother of Qaim Khan Bangash. His father Muhammad Khan Bangash was a powerful Mughal nobleman who ruled a large domain in what is now Uttar Pradesh, with his capital at Farrukhabad. Although his father Muhammad Khan, being a mere mercenary who was noted for his lack of Adab, was so illiterate that he did not understand a single word of either Persian or Pashto, Ahmad Khan was more accustomed to the Nawabi and Indo-Persian lifestyle of Delhi. He accompanied his father when it was required for him to translate from Persian.

After Muhammad Khan Bangash's death, his eldest son Kaim Khan Bangash inherited his domains. During the reign of his elder brother, Nawab Kaim Khan, he lived at the imperial Mughal capital of Delhi for some time. He returned to Farrukhabad and took a farming lease of five parganas, Sakrawah (a village) among others, from his brother Kaim Khan.

However, instead of paying the revenue from his lands he spent it on a silver howdah, a privilege which only Nawab Kaim Khan owned. Mahmud Khan Bakhshi, a courtier at Farrukhabad instigated Kaim Khan against his brother Ahmad Khan, a thousand cavalry were despatched to Sakrawah with orders to kill Ahmad Khan. Ahmad Khan escaped to Delhi, where he placed himself under the protection of the Mughal nobleman Ghazi ud-Din Feroze Jung.

== Accession ==
Nawab Kaim Khan despised Safdar Jang, the ruler of Awadh because of the Awadh nawabs' troubled relations with his father Muhammad Khan Bangash. Due to the scheming of Safdar Jang, Kaim Khan, was killed in a battle at Badaun in 1749 against Dundi Khan of the Kingdom of Rohilkhand. Farrukhabad was formally annexed to Awadh and plundered.

Ahmad Khan thus escaped from Delhi at midnight with the help of Feroze Jang, without receiving the Emperor's permission. He lived in poverty for some time at Farrukhabad, until Rustam Khan Afridi among other Pathan chiefs, tired of Awadh's tyranny, requested Ahmad Khan to reconquer the Bangash lands and become Nawab. Ahmad Khan gathered an army of 10,000 and declared himself Nawab after re-capturing Farrukhabad.

== Reign ==
Nawal Rai, the Hindu deputy of Safdar Jang personally marched to Farrukhabad to suppress the rebels. The Utara, the act of dismounting and fighting on foot to the death, was a peculiarity of Indian Muslims horsemen of which they were very proud, which William Irvine says specially affected Indians such as the Barha Sayyids. When Ahmad Khan Bangash met the army of Naval Rai, he was faced by the Rai's contingent of Barha Sayyids who had made Ahmad Khan's troops to flee from the battlefield. Disdaining to leave the place alive, Ahmad Khan practised the act of Utara or dismounting and had his soldiers tie their skirts of their heavy plaited coats (Jamaah) to fight to the death, cursing his men: "Have you brought me here only to see you run away". At the Battle of Khudaganj on the night of 12 August 1750, Ahmad Khan's troops surprised Nawal Rai, the deputy of Safdar Jang and gained victory. Safdar Jang was furious at the Bangash rebellion and marched from Delhi to Marhara. On 13 September 1750, Ahmad Khan defeated Safdar Jang in a pitched battle at Ram Chatauni. In 1750, a powerful coalition was against Safdar Jang at the Mughal court, which included Ahmad Khan Bangash, Nasir Jung, Intizam-ud-Daulah, Javed Khan and the Kingdom of Rohilkhand. However, the alliance fell apart after the death of Javed Khan.

Ahmad Khan then laid siege to Allahabad, which he was about to capture when Safdar Jang called in the Marathas under Malhar Rao Holkar and Jayappaji Rao Scindia, the Jats under Suraj Mal and the Rohillas under Nawab Saadullah Khan for help. After a string of defeats, Ahmad Khan fled to the north and was only able to return after promising half of his lands to the Marathas in 1752.

After his return to Farrukhabad, Ahmad Khan soon became prosperous again and a school of painting developed under him. He began spending most of his time at the imperial court in Delhi. According to J.L. Gommans, he lived a luxurious life there and "started to pilfer precious books and paintings from the imperial stores". In 1756, Ahmad Khan cultivated a close friendship with the Mughal nobleman Imad-ul-Mulk, who appointed Ahmad Khan as Amir-ul-Umara and Mir Bakhshi of the Mughal Empire on the dismissal of Najib-ud-Daula. Ahmad Khan became a leading figure in court owing to Imad-ul-Mulk and became the leader of the Indo-Afghan nobility.

In 1757, Ahmad Khan Bangash readily contributed valuable troops to the attack of Awadh under Nawab Shuja-ud-Daula by Imad-ul-Mulk.

In 1761, he supported the Durrani king Ahmad Shah Abdali against the Marathas in the Third Battle of Panipat. As a result, he received extensive territories in the Mian doab (in Uttar Pradesh) along with the Rohilla nawab. Thus, Ahmad Khan recovered his territories lost to the Marathas.

Taking advantage of the Maratha threat to his power, Nawab Shuja-ud-Daula, the ruler of Awadh, attacked Farrukhabad in 1762. In 1764, Nawab Shuja-ud-Daula requested the help of Ahmad Khan Bangash, Hafiz Rahmat Khan and other Indo-Afghan chiefs against the British East India Company, who had been rapidly advancing on Awadh after their victory at the Battle of Buxar. Ahmad Khan and the other chiefs all declined to help due to fear of the British.

The Marathas invaded Ahmad Khan's domains once again in 1769, and he defended his kingdom with great difficulty. On 12 July 1771, Ahmad Khan Bangash passed away and was succeeded by his younger son Diler Himmat Khan as Nawab of Farrukhabad.

== Personal life ==
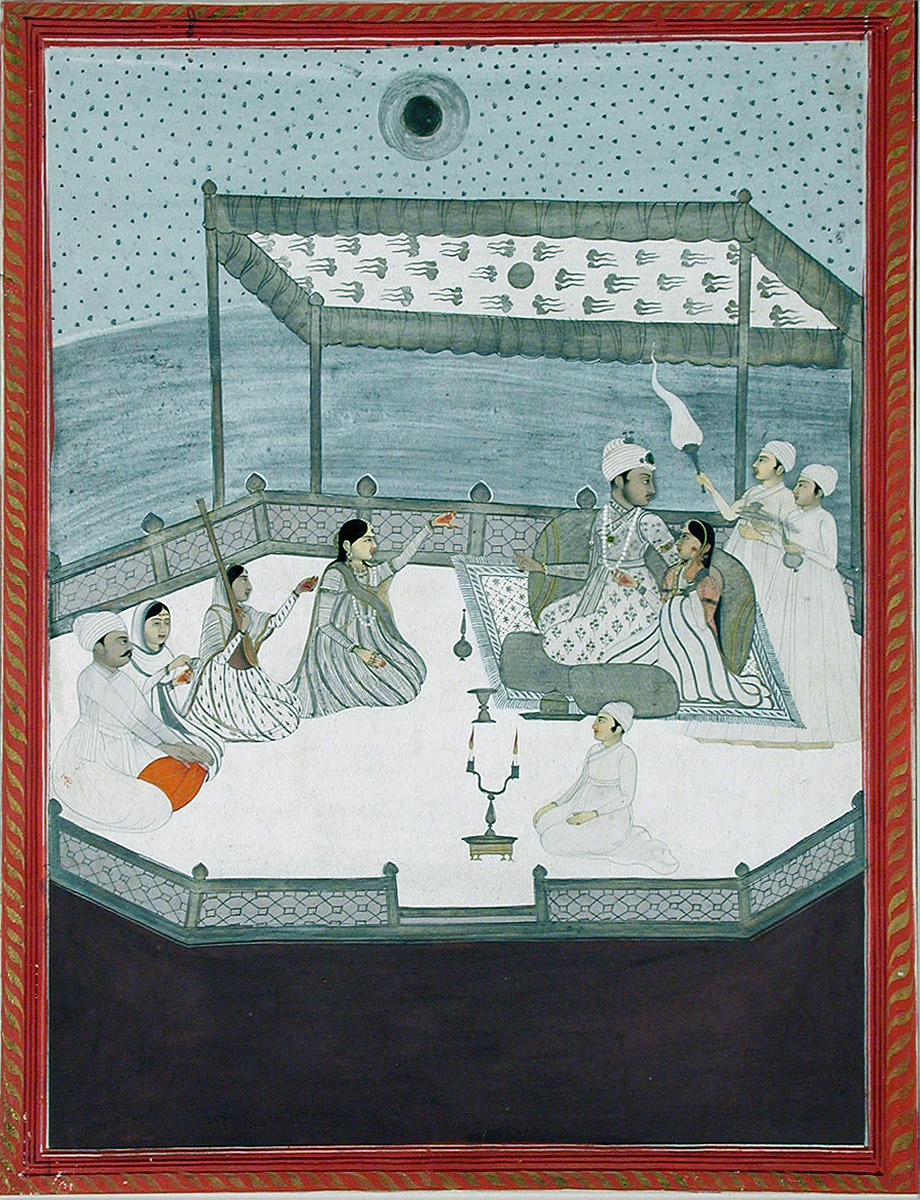
Nawab Ahmad Khan Bangash seated with a woman on a terrace at night

Ahmad Khan's first wife was Dulhin Begum, through whom he had his sons Mahmud Khan and Rustan Khan. Mahmud Khan greatly assisted his father in the re-conquest of Farrukhabad from Awadh.

When one of Naval Rai's escorts tried to curse the men of Ahmad Khan in Pashto, they had heard his speech but did not understand its words, and required a translator to understand him.

Ahmad Khan married his fourth wife Khair-un-nissa around 1756. Khair-un-nissa was the adopted daughter of Yakut Khan, one of Ahmad Khan's slaves and reportedly a descendant of Khan Jahan Khan Lodi, the principal Afghan noble during the reign of Mughal emperor Shah Jahan. Khair-un-nissa was sixteen when he married her; they had a son around 1757-1758, who was named Diler Himmat Khan. Later, Diler Himmat Khan succeeded him as Nawab of Farrukhabad.

The celebrated Urdu poets, Mirza Sauda and Mir Soz were in the employ of Ahmad Khan Bangash.
