= Pataunja =

- Village
- Location in Uttar Pradesh, India Pataunja (India)
- Coordinates: 27°15′15″N 79°32′15″E
- Country: India
- State: Uttar Pradesh
- District: Farrukhabad

Government
  - Body: Gram panchayat
- Elevation: 150 m (490 ft)

Population
  - Total: 5,327

Languages
  - Official: Hindi, Urdu
- Time zone: UTC+5:30 (IST)
- PIN: 209739
- Vehicle registration: UP-

Pataunja is a village in Farrukhabad District of Uttar Pradesh in India. The village is 17 km by road from Chhibramau on the NH 91.

== Etymology ==
The village's name is derived from the Hindi word "patjad" which is synonymous with the fall weather, as during this time a lot of dried leaves from the dense vegetation would cover the surrounding area of the village.

== Population ==
Most of the village population are Hindu and Muslims]s and share the last

== Administration ==
At present the village panchayat unit (local administrative body) is headed kotwal rajput

== Notable people from Pataunja ==
The village had a world known personality Dr. Riaz Ahmad Usmani Professor of Mathematics in the University of Manitoba at Winnipeg, Manitoba, Canada. He died at All India Institute of Medical Sciences in New Delhi in 1995 while visiting India. He was visiting professor at Aligarh Muslim University, Aligarh, Uttar Pradesh in 1977. He is buried in his native village Pataunja along with his parents and wife.
