= Karlani =

Pashtun tribal confederacy

Karlānī کرلاڼي
- Ethnicity: Pashtun (Historically referred as Afghans)
- Location: Afghanistan, Pakistan
- Population: several millions
- Branches: Afridi, Bangash, Banusi, Dawar, Dilzak, Khattak, Khogyani, Mahsud, Mangal, Orakzai, Tanai, Utmankhel, Wardak, Wazir, Zadran, Zazi (Dzadzi), Turi
- Language: Pashto
- Religion: Islam

The Karlāṇī (کرلاڼي; also spelled Karrani) are a major Pashtun tribal confederacy. They primarily inhabit the former tribal areas of Khyber Pakhtunkhwa, Pakistan, as well as parts of eastern Afghanistan.

In the 16th century, a branch of the confederacy established the Karrani dynasty, which served as the final ruling dynasty of the Bengal Sultanate before its integration into the Mughal Empire.

== Origins ==
The term Karlani (also spelled Karrani) literally translates to "adopted." The exact ethnogenesis of the Karlani Pashtuns remains a subject of historical dispute. The 17th-century Mughal scholar Nimat Allah al-Harawi did not include the Karlani tribes in his genealogical work, the Makhzan-i-Afghani.

According to one Pashtun legend, Karlan was the adopted son of Qais Abdur Rashid, the eponymous ancestor of the Pashtun people. Another variant of the tradition states that Karlan was a foundling discovered by two Ormur brothers in an empty field where an army had encamped the previous night. One brother, who was childless, exchanged a cooking pot for the infant, leading to the tribal lore that the Karlanis are "adopted" tribes of potentially non-Pashtun origin.

Some historians suggest that various Karlani groups, such as the Afridis or Bangash, may have absorbed elements of Dardic, Arab, or other local lineages over time. Certain sections of the Karlani confederacy also claim Sayyid descent from Muhammad. Despite these diverse origin theories, the Karlani tribes identify as Pashtun and adhere to the Pashtunwali code.

== Dialect ==
Karlani tribes speak Central Pashto, a distinct dialect of Pashto.

== Karlani tribes ==
1. Afridi
2. Bangash
3. Banusi
4. Dawari
5. Dilazak
6. Khattak
7. Khogyani
8. Mahsud
9. Mangal
10. Orakzai
11. Ormur
12. Tanai
13. Turi
14. Utmankhel
15. Wardak
16. Waziri
17. Zadran
18. Zazi (Dzadzi)

== See also ==
- Sarbani
- Bettani
- Gharghashti
