= Farrukhabadi =

Farrukhabadi is an Indian toponymic surname originating from the Farrukhabad in northern India. It may refer to

- Anwar Farrukhabadi, Indian Sufi poet from Farrukhabad district
- Rehmat Farrukhabadi (1942–1993), pen name of Muhammad Rehmatullah Qureshi, Pakistani author and Muslim scholar from Farrukhabad
