= Dawar (Pashtun tribe) =

Pashtun tribe

Alizai/Dawar
داوڑ

Languages
- Pashto

Religion
- Islam

Related ethnic groups
- Bannuzais · Khattaks · Wazirs · Mehsuds · Mangals · Zazais · Zadrans · Afridis · and other Karlani Pashtun tribes

Dawar (Pashto: داوړ) is a Karlani Pashtun tribe mostly inhabiting North Waziristan, with some settled in the Bannu District of the Khyber Pakhtunkhwa province in Pakistan. The Dawars inhabit the Tochi Valley and speak the Dawari dialect of Pashto.

Dawar/Alizai is a descendant of a greater Shitak tribe and a cousin tribe of Wazir/Bannuzai and Tani/Taniwal.

== History ==
=== Origin ===
The Dawars originally lived in the Shawal area, which lies partly in the present-day North Waziristan District of Bannu Division in Pakistan and partly in the Paktika Province of Afghanistan. The Dawars are descended from the Shitak supertribe of the Pashtuns. Dawars are descend from the Shitaks. In the 14th century, the Wazirs another Pashtun tribe, who were living in Birmal in the west, migrated eastwards to the Shawal area and fell into dispute with the Shitaks (Dawar and Banuchi's) and succeeded to oust the Shitaks northeastwards. Eventually, the Dawari Shitaks settled in the Tochi Valley in the modern-day North Waziristan.

=== British rule ===
In March of 1872, Dawar tribesmen refused to pay a fine to the British and this resulted in a conflict with forces under the command of Brigadier-General C.P. Keyes of the British Indian Army at the Tochi Valley after which the tribe sued for peace. At the beginning of the twentieth century the tribe had some 5,200 fighting men, and in 1911 it was noted that although they were surrounded on all four sides by a Waziri population they bear little resemblance to the Waziris. They are an agricultural people whilst the Waziris are pastoral, and they are much richer than their neighbours. They thrive on a rich sedimentary soil copiously irrigated in the midst of a country where cultivable land of any kind is scarce and water in general hardly to be obtained.

During the colonial era their location along the fertile land meant they were prone to fevers and other ravaging diseases that are bred in the wet sodden lands of the Tochi Valley, lying at the bottom of a deep depression exposed to the burning rays of the sun. The effects of this could be clearly seen in the drawn or bloated features and the shrunken or swollen limbs of nearly every Dawari that has passed middle life.

== Notable Dawars ==
- Mohsin Dawar
- Noor Islam Dawar
- Tahir Dawar
