= Sheikh Mohammad Rohani =

Sheikh Muhammad Rohani(~ 616-704 Hijri/ ~1220-1305 AD)(Pashto:شيخ محمد روحانى) also known as Shah Muhammad Rohani and Rohani Ba Ba was a 13th century Sufi saint. His burial site, located on a scenic hill in southern Afghanistan, is a shrine visited by thousands of visitors. The saint is said to have migrated to current day Afghanistan in the later parts of the 13th century AD during the decline of the Abbasid Caliphate. He was a contemporary of the renowned Sheikh Rukn-e-Alam.

Sheikh Rohani is credited for guiding several Afghan communities to Islam, most notably the Fermuli tribe in southern Afghanistan. He was the spiritual leader, "Pir," of the Banuchi tribe in Bannu where the cleric is still held in great esteem.

In Afghanistan and Pakistan, descendants of the sheikh are revered as Sayyid.

In 13th century AD, Sheikh Muhammad Rohani and his sons aided the Bannuchi/Bannuzai tribe gain control of the Bannu region after Mangal and Hani tribes reneged on their promises to deliver the customary ten percent tax to the family of the sheikh. In 1504, when the Moghul emperor, Zahiru'din Muhammad Babur, conquered southern Afghanistan, he visited the shrine of this saint in Zurmat at a spring high on a hilltop. The descendants of the sheikh were allowed to collect and appropriate local taxes during the reign of Moghul emperor Aurangzeb Alamgir but the emperor's son Bahadur Shah discontinued this custom. Nevertheless the descendants of the sheikh were exempt from Mogul and later Durrani taxes until 1847 when Sir Herbert Edwardes, a British colonial officer, levied six percent tax on their annual income.

In 2017 the government of Afghanistan named a district after this saint. The district of Rohani Baba is located in Paktia Province in southern Afghanistan.

Sheikh Mohammad Rohani had five sons from two wives. Sheikh Naikbin and Sheikh Fateh-ul-din settled in Bannu and Ghaznin. Their descendants are known as Faqirkhail and Fatehkhail. Sheikh Ismail and Sheikh Ahmad settled in the Arghistan basin and Khwaja Arman hills. Their descendants are Ismailzai and Ahmadkhail. A fifth son was Sheikh Nasr-ul-din.

== See also ==
Sayyid

Rukn-e-Alam

Abbasid Caliphate
