= Zala Zazai =

Afghan lady former police officer

Zala Zazai (Pashto: ځلا ځاځۍ) is a former Afghan police officer who worked in Khost Province. In 2021, she was named on the BBC 100 Women list.

== Early life ==
Zazai was born into a Zazai Pashtun family that did not support girl's education; however, her mother pushed for Zazai to be able to study.

== Career ==
Zazai trained as a police officer in Turkey. She was sworn in as the deputy chief of the criminal investigation police department in Khost Province in June 2020. Her appointment received mixed reactions from the community, as she was the first woman police officer in the province, which has been characterized as conservative and traditional. In addition to her other duties, she investigated crimes against women.

Zazai left Afghanistan for Tajikistan following the Taliban takeover of the country in August 2021. She has since relocated to Europe. She has remained in contact with other female police officers still living in the country. She has continued to raise awareness of women's status under the Taliban, and has criticized the Taliban and their policies relating to women, as well as efforts by other countries to pursue diplomatic ties with the Taliban.

== Personal life ==
Some of Zazai's extended family stopped talking to her following her swearing in as deputy chief; she reported receiving death threats from her father and uncles for taking the job.
