= Aryob =

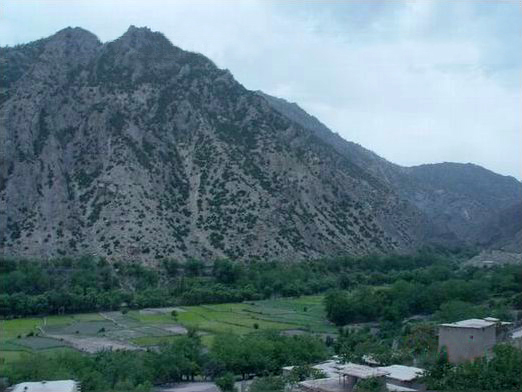
Ahmadkhel village in Zazi District

Aryob (Pashto: اریوب) or Aryub is the main town of Zazi District in the Paktia Province of Afghanistan where the Zazi tribe of Pakhtuns live.

== See also ==
- Zazi Maidan, town in Khost Province, Afghanistan
- Loya Paktia
