= Zazai District =

District in Paktia Province, Afghanistan

Coordinates: 33.9778°N 69.6728°E

Zazi District Pashto: ځاځي ولسوالۍ
- District
- Location in Afghanistan
- Country: Afghanistan
- Province: Paktia
- Center: Aryob

Population (2025)
  - Total: 77,611
- Time zone: UTC+04:30 (Afghanistan Time)

Zazi District (Pashto: ځاځي ولسوالۍ), also called Zazai Aryub District, is one of the 15 districts of Paktia Province in southeastern Afghanistan. It has an estimated population of 77,611 people. Its administrative center is the town of Aryub.

Zazi district serves as one of Afghanistan's tourist destinations. It is within the heartland of the Zazi tribe of Pashtuns.

== See also ==
- Districts of Afghanistan
- Tourism in Afghanistan
