= Yaqutganj railway station =

Railway station in India

Yaqutganj railway station

General information
- Coordinates: 27.327851°N 79.6158741°E
- Platforms: 1

Other information
- Station code: YAG
Location
- Location within India Location within Uttar Pradesh

Yagutganj railway station is a single-platform stop in Yaqut Ganj village in the Farrukhabad district, Uttar Pradesh. Nine trains stop there each day.
