= Ismail Khel, Bannu =

Ismail Khel
- Town and union council
- Interactive map of Ismail Khel
- Country: Pakistan
- Region: Khyber-Pakhtunkhwa
- District: Bannu District
- Time zone: UTC+5 (PST)

Ismail Khel is a town and union council in Bannu District of Khyber-Pakhtunkhwa.
