= Devrampur =

Village in Farrukhabad, Uttar Pradesh

Devrampur is a village in Farrukhabad, Uttar Pradesh, India.
