= Farrukhabad =

- City
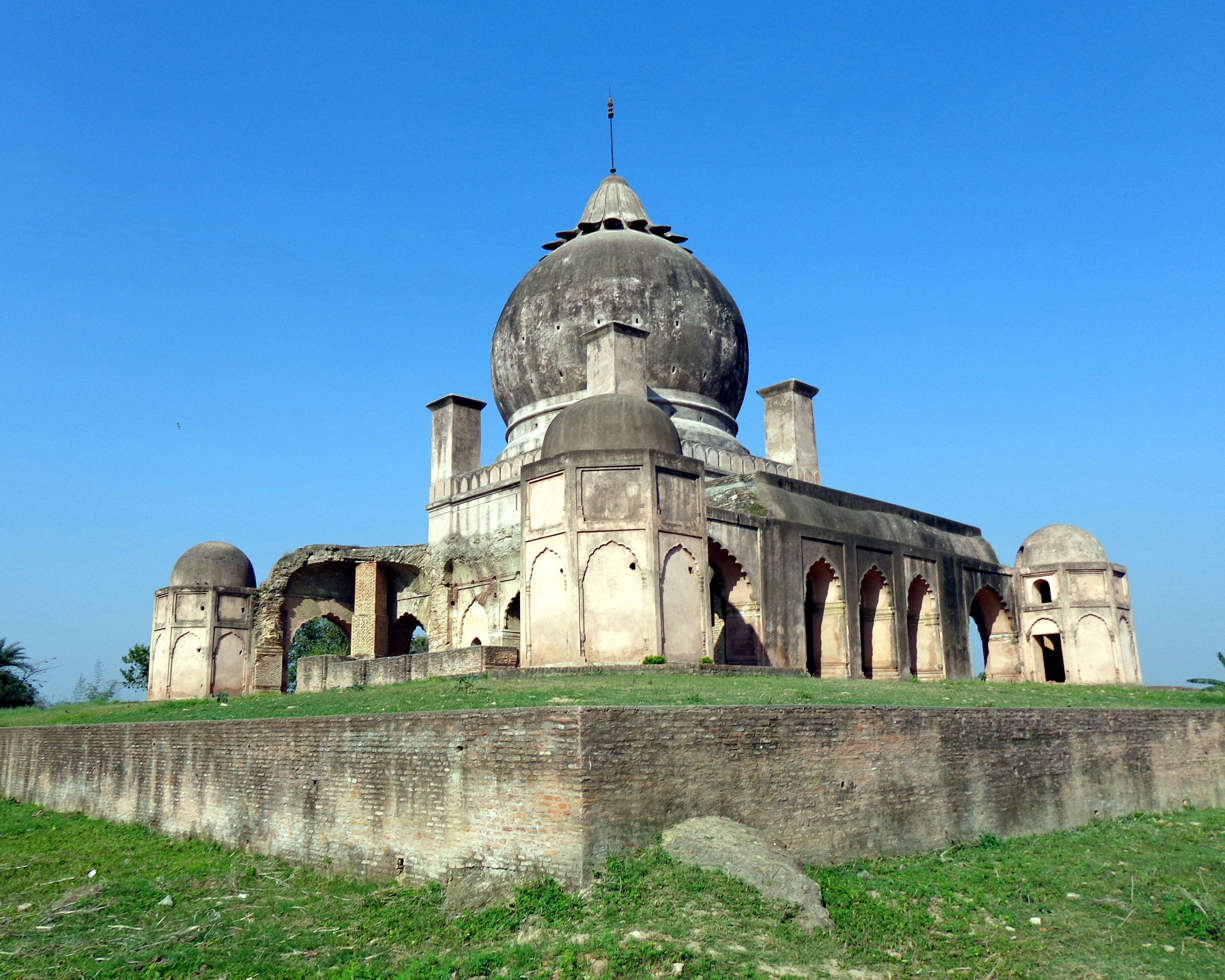
- Tomb of Nawab Muhammad Khan Bangash

- Location in Uttar Pradesh Location in India
- Coordinates: 27.390°N 79.581°E
- Country: India
- State: Uttar Pradesh
- District: Farrukhabad
- Founded: 1714
- Founded by: Muhammad Khan Bangash
- Named after: Farrukhsiyar

Government
  - MP: Mukesh Rajput
  - District Magistrate: Ashutosh kumar dwivedi
  - Superintendent of police: Arti Singh, IPS

Population (2011)
  - Total: 275,754
- Demonym: Farrukhabadi

Language
  - Official: Hindi
  - Additional official: Urdu
- Time zone: UTC+5:30 (IST)
- PIN: 209625
- Telephone code: 05692
- Vehicle registration: UP-76
- Nearest city: Bareilly (120KM); Kanpur (130 KM); Agra (180 KM)
- Effective literacy: 73.4%
- Lok Sabha constituency: Farrukhabad
- Website: farrukhabad.nic.in

Farrukhabad is a city in the Indian state of Uttar Pradesh. It is the administrative headquarters of the Farrukhabad tehsil. This city is on the banks of river Ganges is 295 kilometres (183 mi) from the national capital Delhi and 210 kilometres (130 mi) from the state capital Lucknow.

== History ==
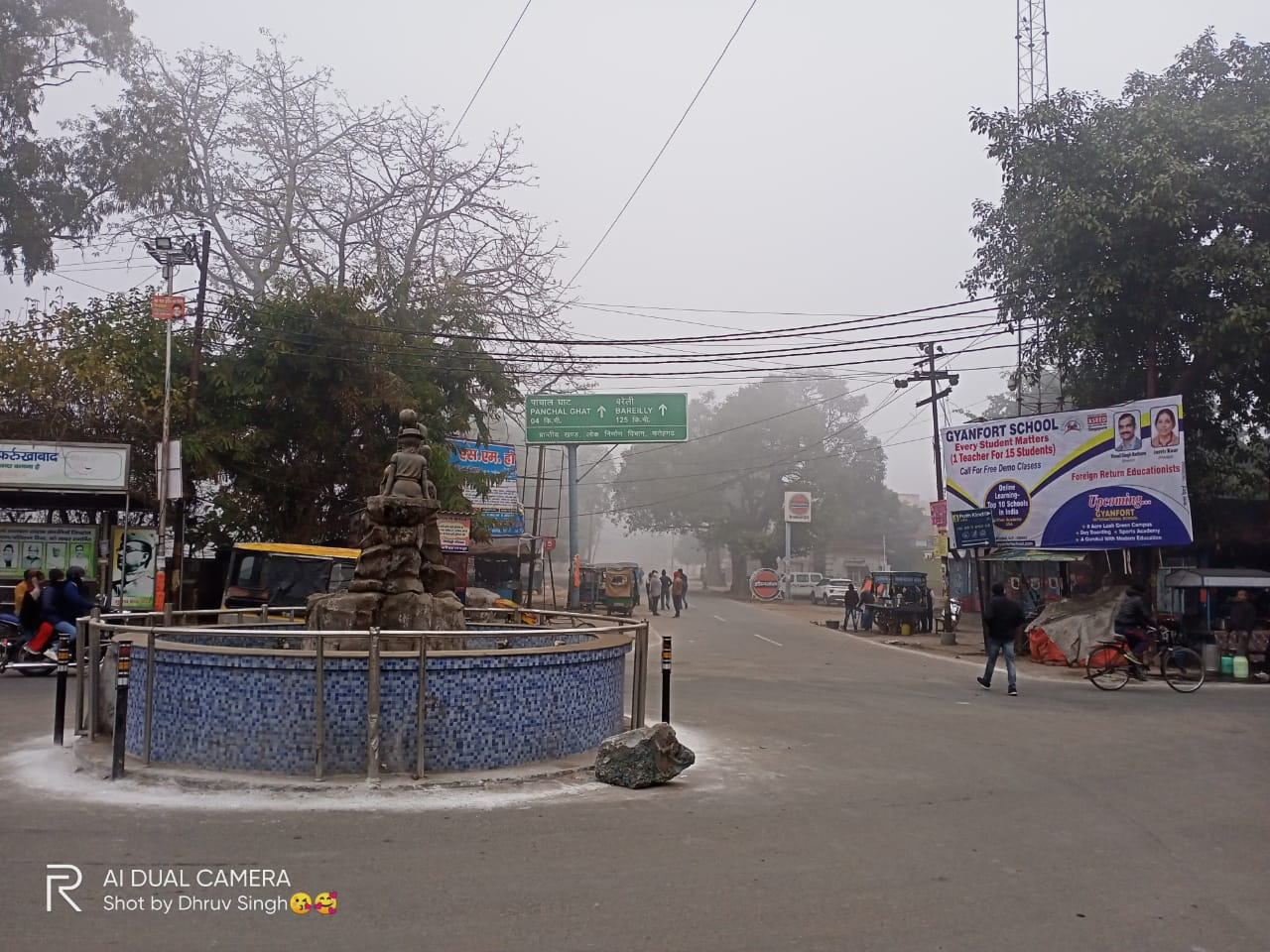
Chauraha showing directions to Panchal ghat

Farrukhabad was founded by Nawab Muhammad Khan Bangash, who named it after the then reigning Mughal emperor Farrukhsiyar, in 1714. The district of Farrukhabad forms part of Kanpur division.

== Demographics ==
Religions in Farrukhabad (2011)
Religion	Percent
Hinduism	74.23%
Islam	24.67%
Christianity	0.59%
Other or not stated	0.51%
Distribution of religions

As of 2011 India census Farrukhabad had a population of 276,581 along with Fatehgarh, of which 145,641 were males and 130,940 were females. The population in the age group 0 to 6 years was 34,474. The total number of literates in the city 177,793, which constituted 64.2% of the total population, with 98,659 males and 79,134 females being literate. The effective literacy of 7+ population was 73.4% with male literacy of 77.6%, and female literacy is 68.8%. Sex ratio of Farrukhabad is 899 per 1000 male. The Scheduled Castes and Scheduled Tribes population was 32,769 and 43 respectively. Farrukhabad had 48,850 households in 2011

According to 2001 census, Farrukhabad-cum-Fatehgarh had a population of 227,876, of which 120,783 were males and 107,093 were females. Population between the age of 0 to 6 years was 30,120. The total number of literates were 143,736, which constituted 63% of the total population.

Languages in Farrukhabad (2011)
1. Hindi (89.1%)
2. Urdu (10.7%)
3. Others (0.21%)

Hindi is the most spoken language. Urdu is the second-largest language.

== Economy ==
Farrukhabad is one of the cities notable for zardozi embroidery and zari weaving. The craft was brought by the Afghans in the 12th century.

== Transportation ==
=== Railways ===
- Farrukhabad Junction railway station
- Fatehgarh railway station
- Yaqutganj railway station
- Kaimganj railway station
- Kamalganj railway station

=== Roadways ===
Farrukhabad was a part of the Ganga Expressway, an ambitious project of Rs. 400 billion to provide high speed connectivity between the eastern and the western parts of the state. The city has a bus station belonging to the Uttar Pradesh State Road Transport System.

=== Airways ===
Farrukhabad has an airstrip at Mohammadabad so that in case of any natural calamity it can be reached easily by small aircraft and helicopters. The nearest airport is Kanpur Airport.

== See also ==
- Farrukhabadi
- Devrampur
- Panchala
- Pataunja
- Badayun
- List of cities in Uttar Pradesh
