= Zazai Maidan =

Location in Khost Province, Afghanistan

- Location in Afghanistan
- Coordinates: 33°37′35″N 70°08′03″E
- Country: Afghanistan
- Province: Khost Province
- District: Zazai Maidan District
- Elevation: 3,350 ft (1,020 m)
- Time zone: UTC+4:30 (AFT)

Zazai Maidan (Pashto: ځاځي ميدان), may also be spelled as Jajai Maidan and Dzadzai Maidan, is a village and the center of Zazai Maidan District in Khost Province of Afghanistan. It sits at approximately 1,020 m (3,350 ft) above sea level. The two "z" letters in Zazai are pronounced the same like in the given name of Hollywood star, Zsa Zsa Gabor.

== See also ==
- Aryob, also called Zazai Aryob, town in Paktia Province, Afghanistan
- Khost Province
