= Zaimukhts =

Pashtun tribe

The Zaimukhts (Pashto: زیموکټ) is a Pashtun tribe living on the northwest frontier of Pakistan, to the south of the Turi on the Kohat border of the Khyber Pakhtunkhwa. The Zaimukhts inhabit the hills to the south of the Turis between the Miranzai and Kurram valleys. Their country may be described as a triangle, with the range of hills known as the Samana as its base, and the village of Thal in the Kurram valley as its apex. The Zaimukhts are a fine-looking powerful race, who at the start of the 20th century had a fighting strength of some 3,000 men.
