= Zazai Maidan District =

District of Khost Province, Afghanistan

Zazai Maidan District ځاځي ميدان ولسوالۍ
- District
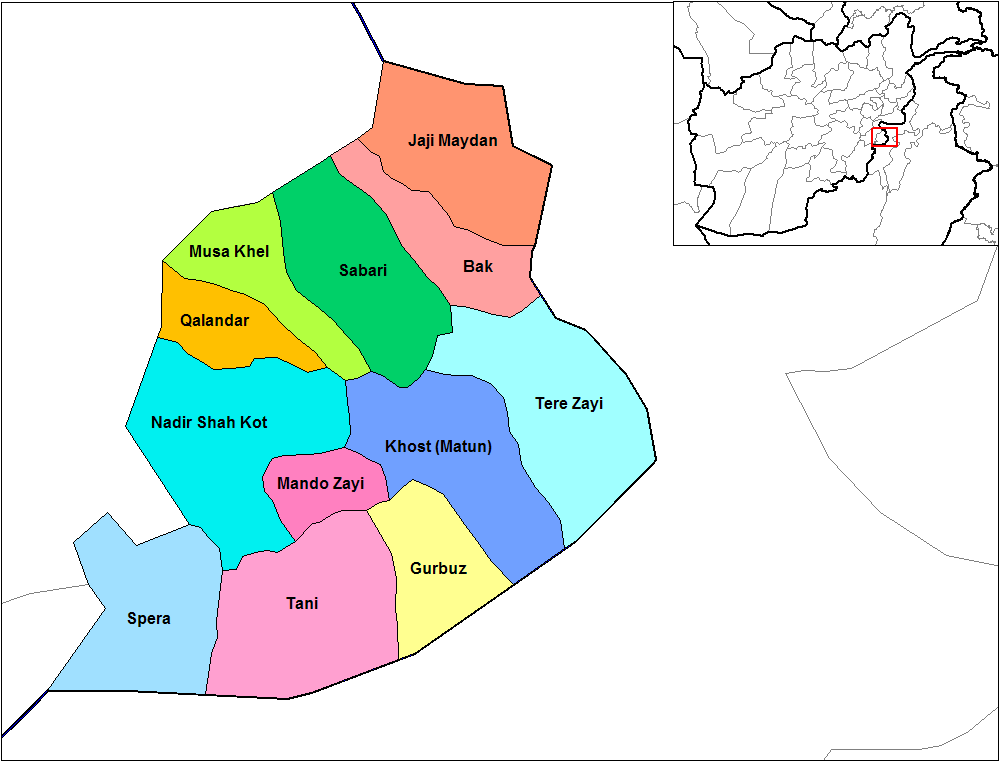
- Zazai Maidan District shown in orange in the far north

- Location within Afghanistan
- Coordinates: 33°38′N 70°04′E
- Country: Afghanistan
- Province: Khost
- Capital: Zazai Maidan

Population (2020)
  - Total: 26,236
- Time zone: UTC+4:30 (AFT)

Zazai Maidan District (Pashto: ځاځي ميدان ولسوالۍ), also spelled as Zazi Maidan and Dzadzai Maidan, is located in the northeastern part of Khost Province, Afghanistan.

It borders Bak District to the west, Paktia Province to the north, and the Kurram Agency of Pakistan to the north and east. According to Afghanistan's National Statistics and Information Authority (NSIA), the 2020 estimated population of the district was 26,236 people. The district center is the village of Zazai Maidan, situated in the eastern part of the district.

== See also ==
- Districts of Afghanistan
