= Banuchi =

Pashtun tribe

Bannuzai (Shitak): بانيسي.بنیڅي; بنوڅي
- Pashtun tribe
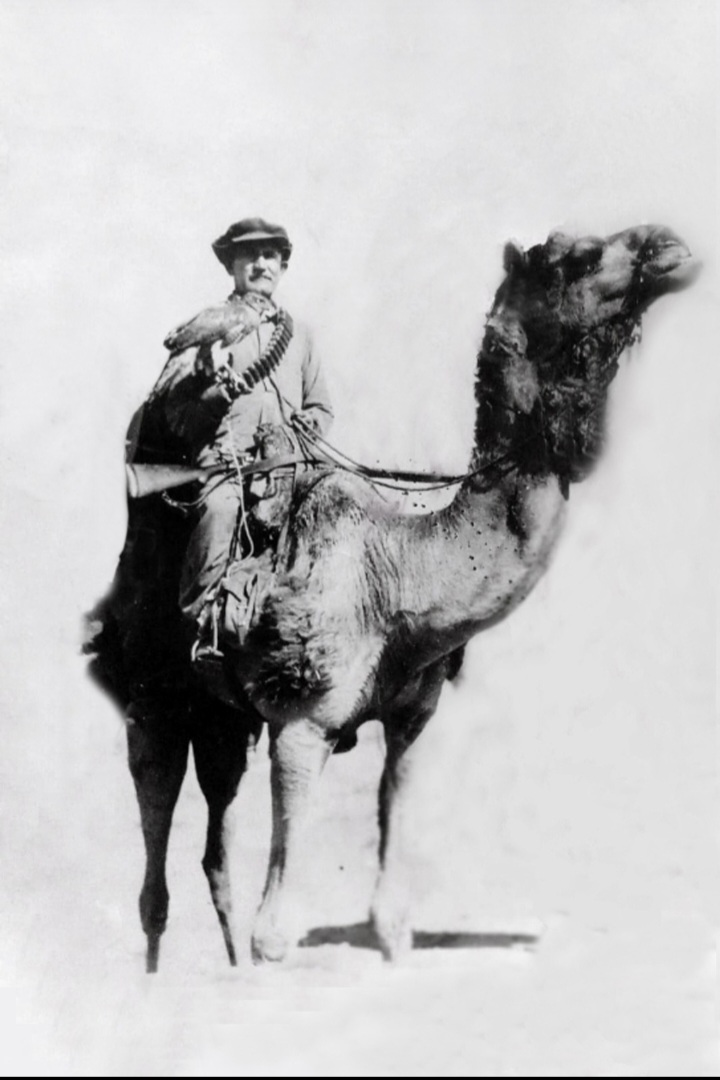
- Capt. Dr. Baghdad Khan Umerkhel in his hunting attire (Chief of Bannuzai's)
- Ethnicity: Pashtun
- Location: Afghanistan, Pakistan (Khyber Pakhtunkhwa)
- Descended from: Shitak
- Parent tribe: Karlani
- Language: Pashto
- Religion: Islam

The Banuchi (Shitak) (Pashto: شيتک), Bannuzai (Pashto: بنوزي), also Banusi (Pashto: بنوڅي) or Banisi, is a tribe of Pashtun people. They inhabit the Bannu District and Dera Ismail Khan of the Khyber Pakhtunkhwa province of Pakistan and North Waziristan of the Federally Administered Tribal Areas, with some members settled in Afghanistan. The Banuchi trace their descent to the Shitak superclan of the larger Karlani tribe. The word Banuchi is strictly used for the people who descend from the Shitak super tribe namely Surani (Sur), Mirian (Miri) and Sam (Sami).

== Etymology and origins ==
The Shitak tribe migrated to Bannu after the fall of Ghazna in the first half of the 13th century, at that time their leader (Malak) was Shah Farid Shitak. Later for linguistic and spelling convenience of local and foreign languages multiple short names were used when referring to them (Bannuchi, Banusi, Banosi, Banisai or Banisi). The word Banuchi is strictly used for the people who descend from the Shitak super tribe namely Surani (Sur), Mirian (Miri) and Sam (Sami).

== History ==
The Banuchis originally lived in the Shawal area, which lies partly in the present-day North Waziristan tribal agency of Pakistan and partly in the Paktika Province of Afghanistan. The Banuchi, as well as their cousin tribe the Dawars descend from the Shitak supertribe who were settled in Shawal. In the 14th century, the Wazir tribe of Pashtuns, who were living in Birmal in the west, migrated eastwards to the Shawal area and fell into dispute with the Shitaks (Banuchis and Dawars), and succeeded to oust the Shitaks northeastwards towards the land between the Tochi and Kurram rivers. Eventually, the Banuchi Shitaks migrated to the Bannu District, where the Pashtun tribes of the Mangal and the Honai, as well as the Khattak were already settled. The Banuchis first defeated and drove away the Mangals and the Honais, then gradually pushed the Khattaks northwards to Kohat and Karak, and eventually captured and settled in Bannu District.

As soon as their conquest were secured the new colonist divided out the country equally amongst them, the credit for this division (wesh) goes to their spiritual guide Sheikh Mohammad Rohani and his family (Saadats of Bannu). During Khilji rule in India the newly inhabited Banuchis were mostly at peace with fellow Pashtuns. It is said that while attacking Delhi Amir Timur passed through Banuchi lands with no resistance with some might even have accompanied him. Mughal King Babur invaded Bannu in 1505 and brutally massacred Banuchis (Kevis) who physically resisted him. His successors could not hold the land and Bahadar Shah 1 (Son of Alamgir) suffered badly at the hands of Banuchis and Dawars (cousins). A portion of Nadir Shah's army of Iran entered Banuchi lands in 1738 collecting significant tribute. The next seventy years Ahmad Shah and his successors newly created kingdom of Kabul maintained an unstable hold on Banuchis with minimal tax collections. As a result, Bannu was given on lease to Sikhs in 1802 - 1808.

During Sikh Rule between 1802- 1845 political scene for Banuchis was turbulent. Sikhs had taken over the Dera Ismail Khan, Isakhel and Marwats, had now come to Bannu for tax collection. They invaded Banuchis every second or third year. It is during this time that Ghazi Dilasa Khan Banuchi (Surani) of Daud Shah Tappa physically resisted each time and repulsed a much larger Sikh force.

"When Sikhs would come to Bannu with fear of Dilasa Khan, they would go with bad memories" Sir Herbert Edwardes.

The Sikh appointed Sir Herbert Edward (1847) as the governor of Bannu with responsibility to collect taxes from Banuchis on behalf of the Sikh Emperor. The Banuchis were up against a much smarter and larger enemy now. With Dilasa Khan now post exile, old and out of scene, as expected the Sikhs and the British had an open ground to play. All the forts (no less than 400) from where Banuchis were resisting were destroyed. A fort was constructed at a strategic location from where all the canals passing through the lands could be controlled. With complete control of their water the Banuchis were now taxed with no future chances of rebellion in years to come under British rule. While Banuchis were weakened and kept busy by two foreign foes (Sikhs and English), the old rivals Wazirs had appeared on the scene, greedy for land were busy annexing many fair outlying fields.

== Subdivision Of Banuchi (Shitaks) ==
It is important to mention that the greater Shitak clan includes the sons from his other two wives who are step brothers to Banuchis (Dawar, Tani, Haved and Zalem) as outlined in the table underneath.

Like other Pashtuns, Banuchi society is subdivided on patrilineal basis, each individual belongs to a Khel (section) a minor lineage and each Khel (section) than belongs to a major lineage. The purpose of the smaller khels (sections) is to identify genealogical lineages amongst themselves and major lineage (tribe) is to be identified by fellow Pashtuns and outsiders. Banuchis in total have a 150 smaller Khels (Sections) that originate from the major lineage as outlined in the table underneath. The details of each original smaller Khel(section) is available in books, "Hayat-I-Afghani" and "Pashtana da tarikh pa Ranra Kshe".

Shitak (BannuZai) Genealogy

Main gates in Bannu city were named after some of the major clan names, Hinjal gate, Sukari gate, Miryan gate, Mandan gate and Haved gate.

== Population ==
There are estimated 600,000 banuchi (Shitaks) mostly in Bannu and other parts of KPK and Pakistan.

== Religion ==
Banuchis (Shitaks) are predominantly Sunni Muslims.

== Language ==
Banuchis speak with a local distinct Pashto dialect which is closer to regional languages (Dawar & Waziri).

== Food ==
Well known Banuchi food is Painda and Wresha.

== Notable Bannuzai (Shitaks) ==
- Capt. Dr. Baghdad Khan Umerkhel, first (MBBS) doctor of Bannu and neighbouring regions and also the chief of the Banuchi tribe.
- Khan Mir Mast Khan Umerkhel, tribal chief of the Banuchi tribe.
- Ghulam Ishaq Khan, Former President of Islamic Republic of Pakistan
- Ghazi Sial, Renowned Poet and Pashto Folk Songs Writer
- Baz Muhammad Khan, Ex Senator
- Muhammad Ibrahim Khan (Pakistani senator), Ex Senator
- Abdul Hamid (field hockey), Former Olympian and Ex Secretary General Pakistan Hockey Federation
- Abdul Rashid (field hockey, born 1947), Former Olympian
- Qazi Mohib, Former Olympian and Ex Captain Pakistan Hockey Team
- Akram Khan Durrani, Former Chief Minister of Khyber Pakhtunkhwa
- Dost Muhammad Khan, Former Justice of the Supreme Court of Pakistan, Chief Justice of the Peshawar High Court, Justice of Peshawar High Court, (Caretaker) Chief Minister of Khyber Pakhtunkhwa
- Zakir Khan, Former International Cricket Player
- Zahid Akram Durrani, Former Deputy Speaker of the National Assembly of Pakistan
- Murad Jehan, International Volleyball Player, Current captain of Pakistan Volleyball Team
- Khushdil Shah, International Cricket Player
