= Zazi =

Pashtun Tribe

Zazai
ځاځي

Languages
- Pashto

Religion
- Islam

Related ethnic groups
- Mangal, Zadran, Mahsud

The Zazi (Pashto: ځاځي; plur. ځاځی), spelled as Zazai, are a prominent Karlani (کرلاڼي) Pashtun tribe that hail from the Paktia Province of Afghanistan.

They reside primarily in the Paktia and Khost provinces in the Loya Paktia region of southeastern Afghanistan, but also have a presence in several other provinces such as Kabul, Logar, Ghazni, Nangharhar, Kunduz, and Baghlan. They also have a presence in the Kurram District and Khyber Pakhtunkhwa region across the border.

== Ethnicity and geography ==
The Zazai (ځاځی) are Sunni Muslims. The tribe is inhabited in Six major geographic locations in Afghanistan:

- Aryob Zazi: in Paktia province
- Ahmadkhail : in Paktia province
- Dand Pashtun: in Paktia province
- Kabul: in Kabul province
- Zazi Maidan: district in Khost province Afghanistan

== Notable Zazai ==
- Qutbuddin Hilal, Deputy Prime Minister of Afghanistan during the period of Mujahideen (Gulbuddin Hekmatyar) and member of Hezbi Islami from Zazi Maidan district.
- Nabi Misdaq, founder of BBC Pashto service.
- Najibullah Zazi (born 1985), Afghan-born man imprisoned in the US for terrorist offenses; father is Mohammed Wali Zazi.
- Mustafa Zazai (born 1993), professional footballer
- Hazratullah Zazai (born 1998), Afghan cricketer
- Zala Zazai, Afghan police officer

== See also ==
- Aryob
- Loya Paktia
- Zadran
