= Wazir (Pashtun tribe) =

Pashtun tribe

وزیر

Languages
- Pashto

Religion
- Islam; 100% Sunni

Related ethnic groups
- Khattaks; Zadrans; Afridis; Mangals; Mehsuds; other Karlani Pashtun tribes

The Wazirs or Waziris (Pashto: وزير) are a Karlani Pashtun tribe found mainly in the Pakistan–Afghanistan border region. The Utmanzai Wazir are settled in North Waziristan and Wazir Tehsil in Bannu, while the Ahmadzai Wazir and Mahsud Wazir are in South Waziristan, and in Domel, Bannu. Those subgroups are in turn divided further into, for example, Utmanzai tribes such as the Baka Khel and Jani Khel.

The Wazirs speak the Waziristani dialect of Pashto, which is similar to the neighboring Banuchi and Dawari dialect but remains distinct.

The common ancestor of the Ahmadzai and the Utmanzai is believed by them to be the eponymous Wazir, who is also ancestor to the Mahsud, a Wazir tribe that has since taken a distinct and divergent path. Through Wazir, the tribes trace their origins to Karlani and thence to the founder of the Pashtun lineage, Qais Abdur Rashid. Some western ethnologists consider them of being mix of Arachosian or Tatar ethnicity.

Although the Utmanzai and Mehsud tribes have a traditional rivalry and live in geographically-distinct regions, the Ahmadzai and Mehsud communities co-exist peacefully, and many headmen are connected by marriage.
