= Mohmand Valley raid =

2017 US/Afgan special operations raid targeting an ISIL-KP compound in Nangarhar Province

- Part of the War in Afghanistan (2001–2021)
Date	26 – 27 April 2017
Location	Mohmand Valley, Achin District, Nangarhar Province, Afghanistan 34°04′24.01″N 70°37′52.37″E
Result	U.S./Afghan operational success: Emir of ISIL-KP, killed

Belligerents
United States; Afghanistan	Islamic State; Khorasan Province

Commanders and leaders
Unknown	Abdul Haseeb Logari †

Units involved
United States Armed Forces: 75th Ranger Regiment; 3rd Ranger Battalion; US Air Force; 79th Fighter Squadron; Afghan Armed Forces: Afghan Special Security Forces (Kteh Khas)	Military of the Islamic State: Khorasan Province

Strength
50 Army Rangers; AC-130 gunships F-16 fighter jets AH-64 Apache attack helicopters Drones; 40 commandos	Unknown

Casualties and losses
2 killed (friendly fire); 1 wounded	36+ killed including several leaders (per U.S.)
- Location of Achin District, where the raid took place

In the late hours of April 26, 2017, United States and Afghan special operations forces conducted an operation targeting an Islamic State of Iraq and the Levant - Khorasan Province (ISIL-KP) compound in Achin District, Nangarhar Province, Afghanistan. The operation lasted into the early morning hours of the 27th and resulted in the deaths of two US Army Rangers from C and D Companies of the 3rd Battalion, 75th Ranger Regiment, and the death of Abdul Haseeb Logari, the leader of ISIL-KP, alongside several leaders, and up to 35 other militants according to The Pentagon.

== Background ==
On January 11, 2015, Hafiz Saeed Khan, a former member of Tehrik-i-Taliban and the Afghan Taliban, alongside other former Taliban leaders pledged allegiance to Abu Bakr Al-Baghdadi, forming the Islamic State of Iraq and the Levant – Khorasan Province and becoming the group's emir. Seven months later the Islamic Movement of Uzbekistan pledged allegiance to ISIL and claimed membership in the Khorasan group. Immediately after its formation the United States and Afghanistan targeted the group in airstrikes and raids. The group also suffered major setbacks while fighting the Taliban.

In July 2016, Hafiz was killed in a US drone strike, around eight months later in March 2017, the Afghan and US military began an offensive dubbed Operation Hamza, targeting the militant group in Nangarhar Province and Kunar Province.

On 8 March 2017, gunmen attacked the Sardar Daud Khan Military Hospital in Kabul, killing over 100. ISIL-KP claimed responsibility for the attack, while the Afghan government suspects the Haqqani Network.

Less than two weeks before the raid on April 13, 2017, and less than a mile away from the location of the raid, the US military dropped the largest non-nuclear bomb, a GBU-43/B MOAB on an ISIL-KP tunnel network once used by the Mujahideen during the Soviet–Afghan War in the 80s and Osama bin Laden during the invasion of Afghanistan in 2001. The strike killed 96 militants according to an Afghan official.

At the time of the raid, the group had been reduced to an estimated 700 fighters, down from 3,000 fighters at the group's peak, according to US officials.

== Target ==
The target of the operation was a compound in the Mohmand Valley, located less than a mile away from where the US dropped the MOAB bomb. The compound was believed to have housed Abdul Haseeb Logari, the leader of ISIL-KP. Commanders decided to conduct a ground operation over an airstrike because women and children were believed to have been present in the compound.

Haseeb had been the leader of ISIL-KP since July 2017 and was believed to have been in his mid-thirties at the time of the raid.

== Raid ==
At around 10:30 on the night of 26 April, 50 U.S. Army Rangers from 3rd Battalion, 75th Ranger Regiment, alongside 40 Afghan commandos from the Special Security Forces (Kteh Khas), were inserted near the target site by helicopter. Almost immediately after landing the force came under heavy fire from entrenched enemy positions from multiple directions, with the firefight being described as "close quarters with enemy fire coming at 360 degrees". As the joint American/Afghan force pushed through the difficult terrain under fire, they reportedly called in airstrikes from AC-130 gunships, F-16 fighter jets, AH-64 Apache attack helicopters, and drones.

Due to conditions early in the raid, the second assault force was diverted to a backup landing zone. At the landing zone, the Rangers fast-roped out of their helicopter under small arms fire, with one suffering a fall to the ground. An investigation into the raid determined that this decision to divert to a secondary landing position placed the second assault force close to ISIL-KP fighters who were already engaged in combat with “Battle Position-south”, causing them to be caught in crossfire with friendly forces while they moved North to their objective.

A team of Rangers from the primary assault force was preparing to breach the door of an enemy compound when a Ranger fell through the rooftop of the compound of which he was using to provide suppressive fire. When teammates rushed to assist, a suicide bomber detonated in a courtyard on the other side of the structure.

Following the explosion, the team of Rangers engaged in several close-quarter firefights within the compound, killing an individual referred to as “OBJ Nascent Calvia”.

Sgt. Joshua Rodgers, a Ranger team leader, suffered a gunshot wound to his leg, continuing to fight until suffering a second fatal wound. Separately, Sgt. Cameron Thomas and two other Rangers engaged the enemy from a prone position until increased enemy fire forced them to fall 10 feet onto a lower terrace. After falling, Sgt. Thomas notified his teammates that he had been wounded and was having trouble breathing. Under fire, his teammates stripped his equipment and began searching his body for wounds.

Hearing of the casualties from their squads internal radio, teammates left their positions and found Sgt. Rodgers unresponsive in an irrigation channel, cutting away his weapon and aide pack before being able to pull him out of the water.

As small arms fire became more abundant and accurate, a Ranger medic was forced to complete his treatment of Thomas by using a night vision device. Examining his wounds, the medic determined that Thomas needed urgent surgical treatment and that death was likely, calling in for a nine-line medical evacuation. Investigators praised the Ranger medic for his “exceptional medical care” and for demonstrating “a high degree of physical strength” when he performed CPR on Thomas for 15 minutes.

A joint terminal attack controller (JTAC) and two forward observers called in airstrikes as a medevac helicopter reached down. After landing, a flight medic and a member of the medevac surgical team left the helicopter to help secure the casualties on the ground. The investigation into the battle reported “The environment became so kinetic that, after setting the flight plan for departure, [the pilot] was forced to roll down his window and engage approaching enemy fighters with his organic M4.”

After flying out of the valley, the medevac helicopter continued to Jalalabad Airfield, carrying the remains of the two Rangers. Investigators determined the fatal wounds likely came as a result of friendly fire from U.S. forces, noting that ballistic evidence and forensic evidence were consistent with NATO ammunition.

Another Ranger was grazed by a bullet but left the battle on his own choosing.

The raid lasted for more than three hours up to about 3:30 a.m. and resulted in the death of the intended target with the Pentagon calling it as a success in degrading the group's ability to fight.

=== Casualties ===
Among the dead were two Army Rangers identified as 22-year-old Sgt. Joshua Rodgers of Bloomington, Illinois and 23-year-old Sgt. Cameron Thomas of Kettering, Ohio. Both of them enlisted in the Army out of high school and were on their third deployments. Their rewards and decorations include the Army Good Conduct Medal, Army Achievement Medal, Army Service Ribbon, Global War on Terrorism Service Medal, Afghanistan Campaign Star, and the NATO Medal.

United States Secretary of Defense Jim Mattis honored Rodgers and Thomas in a statement, saying "The families and fellow Rangers of Sgt. Joshua 'Josh' Rodgers and Sgt. Cameron Thomas have my respect and sympathies. Fighting alongside their Afghan partners, Josh and Cameron proved themselves willing to go into danger and impose a brutal cost on enemies in their path. They carried out their operation against [the Islamic State of Iraq and Syria-Khorasan] in Afghanistan before making the ultimate sacrifice to defend our nation and our freedoms."

Abdul Haseeb, several other ISIL-KP leaders, and about 35 other militants were killed in the raid according to the U.S. Military.

== Aftermath ==
On April 28, Afghan forces conducted an operation in the Mohmand Valley, reportedly killing 20 ISIL-KP militants according to the Afghan MoD. On May 7, the US Military confirmed the death of Haseeb in a press release.

Abdul Haseeb would be replaced by Pakistani militant Abu Saeed, who would be killed in a US drone strike in Kunar Province on July 11, making him the third ISIL-KP emir killed since July 2016.

=== Medals and honors ===
Army Ranger, Staff Sgt. Michael Young, a squad leader in C Company, 3rd Ranger Battalion, was credited with saving the lives of 22 Rangers and for destroying multiple enemy positions during the raid. He was awarded the Silver Star in April 2018 for his actions.

In a June 2018 ceremony attended by family members of the fallen Rangers, F-16 pilots, Captain John J. Nygard and Captain Salvador A. Cruz, from the 79th Fighter Squadron, were awarded the Distinguished Flying Cross for their actions during the raid, when they conducted precision airstrikes on enemy positions and provided air cover during the evacuation of the casualties. Both men are credited with saving the lives of 88 soldiers during the raid.

In December 2018, the United States Senate passed legislation introduced by Congressman Darin LaHood, to rename the U.S. post office at 200 West North Street in Normal, Illinois after Sgt. Joshua Rodgers. The bill was signed by president Donald Trump on December 21. The post office was renamed in a ceremony attended by family members in early 2019.
