= History of the Islamic State – Khorasan Province =

Logo of the Islamic State's Khorasan Provinc

The Islamic State – Khorasan Province (ISIS–K) is a regional branch of the Islamic State terrorist group active in South-Central Asia, primarily Afghanistan. ISIS–K seeks to destabilize and overthrow existing governments of the historic Khorasan region to establish an Islamic caliphate under its strict, fundamentalist Islamist rule.

== Background ==
Prior to the birth of ISIS–K, a number of Islamic jihadist groups operated in South and Central Asia, many linked to Al-Qaeda. In Iran, groups included Jundullah, Harakat Ansar Iran, and Jaish al-Adl. Pakistan hosted hundreds of groups including Lashkar-e-Taiba (LeT), Harkat-ul-Mujahideen, Lashkar-e-Jhangvi (LeJ), Sepah-e-Sahaba, and Tehrik-e-Taliban-e-Pakistan (TTP). Tajikistan hosted groups such as Islamic Renaissance Party of Tajikistan, Jamaat Ansarullah, and Harakati Islamii Tajikistan. Other groups persisted on the periphery including the Islamic Movement of Uzbekistan (IMU), and the Uyghur-led Turkistan Islamic Party (TIP, a.k.a. East Turkestan Islamic Movement/ETIM). Each group would develop close relations with either Al-Qaeda or the Islamic State in Iraq and Syria.

In response to failed negotiations with the Taliban following the September 11th 2001 attacks by Al-Qaeda against the United States, the U.S. overthrew the Taliban regime in Afghanistan and launched a military campaign against Al-Qaeda and Taliban militants who fought to reclaim the country. The insurgent conflict became a focal point for jihadism in the Khorasan region with nearly every jihadist group in the region taking part to varying degrees.

In 2003, the United States overthrew the Ba’athist government of Iraq and its leader, Saddam Hussein. Jamat al-Tawhid wa-al-Jihad (Organization of Monotheism and Jihad), led by Jordanian Salafist jihadist Abu Musab al-Zarqawi, quickly gained notoriety for bloody attacks on Shia mosques, civilians, Iraqi government, American, and foreign troops. In 2004, Zarqawi swore allegiance to Osama bin Laden and the group became part of Ayman al-Zawahiri's campaign against the United States, becoming known as al-Qaeda in Iraq or AQI. Zarqawi was killed by US forces in June 2006.

By 2010, the Taliban resistance had become weakened under the stresses of factionalism and the Taliban had lost credibility to many of the jihadist groups for its attempts to negotiate with NATO forces. In contrast, the outbreak of the Syrian civil war in March 2011 shifted the attention of jihadists from the Afghan jihad to the Levant. With jihadist groups flocking to take part in the conflict, al-Qaeda's branches in Afghanistan and Pakistan began lobbying to send groups of fighters to join the Syrian jihad, a measure to demonstrate to the world that al-Qaeda was still actively involved in a global jihad, especially as donor states’ interest in the Afghan jihad faded in favor of the surging ISIS campaign in Syria. Although al-Qaeda-linked Afghan and Pakistani jihadists had traveled to fight in the Levant as early as 2003, most groups had been small in number and quickly integrated into assorted ISIS units.

The Syrian civil war, where ISIS attained significant military power and attention for the sizeable terrain it controlled, began to attract slightly larger groups of Afghan and Pakistani militants, many of whom may have been disenchanted with the progress of the Afghan jihad. An April 2012 estimate by Russian security services described 200–250 Afghans and 250–300 Pakistanis from TTP involved in the conflict.

== Prelude ==
A significant development came on 14 July 2012 as Hafiz Saeed Khan, a prominent TTP leader, agreed to rapidly assemble a group of 143 Afghan and Pakistani volunteer fighters for al-Qaeda to dispatch to join the al-Nusra Front in Syria. Similarly, as the Taliban's Quetta Shura and leadership council (Rahbari Shura) refused to send fighters to Syria, the Talban's Peshawar Shura and semi-autonomous Miran Shah Shura (better known as the Haqqani network) arranged a deal between Sirajuddin Haqqani and ISIS-leader Abu Bakr al-Baghdadi to deploy Afghan and Pakistani jihadists to the Syrian conflict on salaries of $800 a month, four times that of Taliban fighters. Most importantly, these jihadist units fought as organized groups and would eventually be brought back to Afghanistan and Pakistan, unlike previous groups which were assimilated into local jihadist groups fighting in Syria. Deployments of groups by al-Qaeda in South Asia and by parts of the Taliban quickly made a remarkable impact on the Syrian conflict. From 2012 through 2014, the ranks of Afghans and Pakistanis in ISIS grew massively with at least 1,000 volunteers deployed by TTP alone.

Likely appreciative of the volunteer fighters supplied by groups in Afghanistan and Pakistan, the ISIS Military Commission in Syria offered ten TTP and Taliban volunteer group leaders from Saeed Khan's first dispatch $1 million to proselytize for the movement when they returned to Afghanistan and Pakistan. Beginning in November 2013, these group leaders began approaching members of each militant group including the Afghan Taliban, TTP, IMU, LeT, LeJ, and others to join the effort. These ten commanders would become ISIS–K's early senior figures including Sheikh Mohsin and Sa'ad Emarati who would become ISIS–K's first emirs of Kunar and Logar Province, respectively. In support of the growing movement, the Haqqani Network and Peshawar Shura, established two training camps in Waziristan and Kunar to teach militants combat skills, vet militants, and provide elementary Arabic language lessons. Once complete, these fighters would transit across Iran and Turkey to reach Syria, mostly posing as economic migrants, or by commercial flight for more senior leaders. At the time, commanders found it fairly easy to motivate fighters to join the fight in Syria as most assumed their former organization would eventually sign a peace deal with the Afghan or Pakistani government, and because the money was more attractive than the region's faltering Taliban donors. One senior ISIS–K member noted in June 2015 "many Arab countries support Daesh: Saudi Arabia, Qatar, UAE, and others. They also have a lot of natural resources under their control, like oil wells." Beginning in mid-2013, the groups' leaders began to swear allegiance to Abu Bakr al-Baghdadi, the emir of the Islamic State, though it remains unclear how the militant's original organizations viewed these newly sworn allegiances or if others opted to remain loyal to al-Qaida's al-Nusra Front.

Through early 2014, even before the Islamic State would officially separate from al-Qaeda and declare a caliphate in Iraq and Syria, Al-Baghdadi (emir of ISIS), Muslim Turkmani (deputy emir), and Abu Omar al-Shishani (senior commander in Raqqa) had been advocating strongly that the volunteers set up a new branch (wilayah) in Afghanistan and Pakistan with the territories of Iran and Central Asia as later goals. On 3 April 2014, al-Shishani appointed Qari Wali Rahman, an Afghan from Baghlan who had been fighting in Syria since 2013, to be the Islamic State's special representative for Afghanistan and Pakistan.

== Disparate groups ==
Even though the Islamic State of Iraq and Syria had agreed to the establishment of a branch in Khorasan, and though a single, special representative to the new branch had been named, the groups of volunteers from the Khorasan region (primarily Afghanistan, Pakistan, and Uzbekistan) were still disunited and dispersed. Only in 2014, had the groups began to form larger organizations and coalesce around a few key commanders. Author Antoni Giustozzi, who writes extensively on the formation of ISIS–K from interviews with senior members, identifies three key "coagulation points" in Afghanistan and one in Pakistan that would later merge to become ISIS–K.

In Afghanistan, three groups formed: Tehrik-e Khilafat Khorasan (TKK), Khilafat Afghan and Muslim Dost's Group, and Azizullah Haqqani's group.

=== Tehrik-e Khalifat Khorasan ===
The first group in Khorasan to be officially recognized by and reportedly most enjoyed by the Islamic State in Iraq and Syria, was Tehrik-e Khalifat Khorasan (Pashto: تحریک خلافت خراسان, 'Movement of the Khorasan Caliphate', TKK). The group, substantially comprising Afghans from the country's east, was originally headed by Abdul Rahim Muslim Dost. Muslim Dost was replaced by Mawlavi Nasratullah Popolzai quickly and reasons for the replacement are largely unknown. Muslim Dost would leave TKK to establish his own group instead.

=== Khilafat Afghan and Muslim Dost ===
The second coalescent group in Afghanistan was Khalifat Afghan (Pashto: خلافت افغان, 'Afghan Caliphate') which was led by Abdul Khadim Rauf. Khadim was an Alizai Pashtun from Helmand in southern Afghanistan who had originally served as the Taliban's provincial governor of Kunar until he was arrested by US forces and sent to the Guantanamo Bay detention camp until his release in 2007. Though he was a senior former cadre of the Taliban's Quetta Shura, Khadim fell out of favor with the Taliban who suspected that Khadim had grown close to Salafist ideas while detained. Khadim's close friend, Sa'ad Emarati, among the first Afghans sent by Hafiz Saeed Khan to join the jihad in Syria, arranged a formal invitation from the Islamic State emir, Abu Bakr al-Baghdadi, to Khadim requesting that he form a group and join ISIS. Khadim formed Khilafat Afghan in 2013 with the 200 men he commanded in Helmand but grew his organization to 1,400 by January 2015.

Having left TKK, Muslim Dost joined Khliafat Afghan, but ended up clashing with Khadim in early 2015 and leaving Khilafat Afghan with 650 of the group's fighters – Muslim Dost's second such clash. Khilafat Afghan had managed to recover from its losses by October 2015 when it claimed 1,140 members. Khadim led the group and its operations in Helmand until he was killed in a U.S. drone strike in Helmand in February 2015, succeeded by his nephew Wahidullah Wahid. 240 of Khilafat Afghan's personnel were support personnel with around 100 managing the group's logistics and finances in Pakistan and 80 members stationed at various headquarters in Doha (its main headquarters, indicative of the group's strong relationship with Qatar), North Waziristan, Nawa in Ghazni, and the UAE.

Following his unceremonious exist from Khilafat Afghan, Muslim Dost's new breakaway group would officially join ISIS–K on 6 March 2015, growing significantly in personnel thanks to ample funding from private Saudi donors. Even though he came from Kot District, Nangarhar, Muslim Dost recruited primarily from members of the Quetta Shura (access he was originally provided by his association with Khadim), though he broadened later to include his home province.

=== Azizullah Haqqani ===
The third coalescent group in Afghanistan was a group led by Azizullah Haqqani. Azizullah, not to be confused with the brother by the same name of Sirajuddin Haqqani, had recruited entirely out of the Haqqani network and Hizb-i Islami. In 2014, Azizullah was temporarily expelled from his senior position on the Miran Shah Shura for his exclusive recruitment of members from the Haqqani network. Azizullah was able to later reconcile with Sirajuddin and regain his position on the shura, until Azizullah resumed his recruitment of Haqqani network leaders, drawing the anger of Sirajuddin in October 2016 and his permanent sacking from the shura.

=== Tehrik-e Khlifat Pakistan ===
In Pakistan, Giustozzi writes, there was a single coagulation point: Tehrik-e Khilafat Pakistan (Pashto: تحریک خلافت پاکستان, 'Caliphate Movement of Pakistan', TKP), not to be confused with the similarly named Tehrik-e Khilafat in Karachi. TKP was organized around Hafiz Saeed Khan, the prominent TTP commander who had, on behalf of the TTP and al-Qaeda leadership in Pakistan, been the first to dispatch units of Afghan and Pakistani militants to Syria with the intent to bring jihadist experience back to the region. Although Saeed Khan had sworn allegiance to ISIS Emir Abu Bakr al-Baghdadi on 11 May 2013, it wasn't until 15 July 2014 that he formally established the TKP, which was announced publicly on 14 August 2014. TKP's membership was the product of merging eight groups within TTP, each comprising a few hundred men and led by a commander:

1. Hafiz Saeed Khan, Orakzai Agency
2. Khalid Mansoor, Hangu District
3. Mufti Hassan Swati, Peshawar
4. Gul Zaman Fateh, Khyber Agency
5. Hafiz Dawlat Khan, Kurram Agency
6. Abdul Bahar Mehsud, Waziristan
7. Abu Bakr, Bajaur Agency
8. Shahidullah Shahid, spokesman of the TTP.

The new allegiance of these TTP groups was initially dismissed by TTP leadership as mere 'hundreds', but later admitted that the number was likely in the thousands and did contribute to a significant fall in TTP membership. Although Abdul Bahar Mehsud, the commander of the largest of these groups, had previously been al-Baghdadi's appointed ISIS representative in Pakistan, Hafiz Saeed Khan's close relationship with al-Baghdadi quickly gave him command of TKP. Unlike TKK, Khilafat Afghan, Muslim Dost's group, or Azizullah's group, TKP substantially comprised returning fighters from the Syrian jihad, most of whom where originally TTP militants. In the same time period, TTP was splintering into a number of offshoot militant groups as many felt disaffected by TTP emir Mullah Fazulllah. TKP benefitted heavily from recruitment of those disaffected TTP members who had Salafist inclinations while others formed splinter groups such as Jamaat-al-Ahrar and the Mehsud faction of the TTP.

== Birth of ISIS–K ==
Up until the end of 2014, the TKK, Khilafat Afghan, Muslim Dost's group, Azizullah's group, and TKP all acted and communicated between each other as distinct, separate entities, despite all swearing allegiance to ISIS emir Abu Bakr al-Baghdadi. That all changed on 26 January 2015 when ISIS Central's chief spokesperson, Abu Muhammad al-Adnan announced in an audio statement the official establishment of Wilayat Khorasan with Hafiz Saeed Khan as Wali. Interviews with ISIS–K leaders suggest that it was from that day forward that members of these formerly separate groups all began to refer to themselves as Daesh, Daesh Khorasan, or Khilafat Islami with a strong discouragement for any continued insinuation of separate groups. One ISIS–K member, formerly of Khilafat Afghan remarked "My boss is Mullah Abdul Khadim, from the Orakzai tribe of Pakistan. I don't know who is my boss and we don't need to know that. I only know who my boss is and who the leader of Khilafat-i-Islami is, Amir-ul-Muminin Abu Bakr al-Baghdadi. Daesh is not like the Taliban where everyone knows about their system."

=== Public appearance ===
Although Khorasan Province wasn't officially established until January 2015, a number of indicators of ISIS's regional presence began appearing in August 2014 when the ISIS-aligned militant groups began its propaganda campaign which included leaflets and pamphlets, including a twelve-page pamphlet in Pashto and Dari in the Pakistani frontier region announcing the "imminent expansion of the Islamic State into Khorasan" and calling on Muslims to swear allegiance to al-Baghdadi. The propaganda materials were believed to have been produced and distributed from across the border in Afghanistan. In November 2014, reports began to emerge in rapid succession telling of a new training camp in Kunar. In January 2015 came a report that thirteen men associated with ISIS–K were arrested in Bagram, Parwan. In February 2015, Afghan army intelligence reports indicated that ISIS–K had around seventy members present in Khakki Safed District, Farah Province, the first the National Directorate of Security's had to admit of ISIS–K's presence in the country. On 9 February 2015, Khadim, the deputy governor of ISIS–K, was killed in a U.S. airstrike in Helmand Province. In March 2015, reports began to surface of ISIS–K propaganda materials being distributed in Kabul for the first time.

== Organizational expansion ==
Though ISIS–K, when it was officially declared in January 2015, was the product of the merger of Tehrik-e Khilafat Khorasan (TKK), Khilafat Afghan, Muslim Dost's group, Azizullah Haqqani's group, and Tehrik-e Khilafat Pakistan (TKP), the organizations expansion attracted various other militant groups, including many from Afghanistan's geographic periphery. Notable among these are the Omar Ghazi Group, Shamali Khilafat, Gansu Hui Group, Harakat Khilafat Baluch, Jaysh ul Islam, Mullah Bakhtwar's group, the Shamsatoo group, and radical student groups in Pakistan and eastern Afghanistan.

=== Omar Ghazi group ===
Formed in February 2015, the Omar Ghazi group emerged from the Islamic Movement of Uzbekistan's (IMU) contingent in Syria, with encouragement from Abu Muslim Turkmani of ISIS-Central. Led by Omar Ghazi and an IMU commander named Sadullah Urgeni, the group initially comprised 580 members, with a presence in Pakistan, Afghanistan, Syria, and Iraq. Primarily based in Faryab, Afghanistan, the group's activities were marked by its alignment with the ISIS ideology. Over time, as ISIS–K gained prominence, the Omar Ghazi Group's status within the broader IMU evolved, with some reintegration reported by spring 2016.

=== Shamali Khilafat ===
Shamali Khilafat, established in northeastern Afghanistan in February 2015, was a faction that emerged as part of ISIS–K, the Khorasan branch of ISIS. Initially formed as a network within the Taliban, centered around Dasht-i Archi near Kunduz, the group gained recognition and claimed its independence from the Taliban in late 2015. Led by Mawlavi Hakimullah Baghlani, Shamali Khilafat attracted Taliban commanders of Uzbek and Tajik ethnicity, particularly those with ties to the former Islamic Movement of Uzbekistan (IMU). The group's formation represented a distinctive coagulation point in northern Afghanistan, distinct from factions rooted in the Syrian war.

By May 2016, Shamali Khilafat claimed around 1,000–1,100 members, with its activities marked by a blend of local affiliations and an indirect relationship with ISIS-Central.

=== Gansu Hui Group ===
The Gansu Hui Group, an entity within ISIS–K, was formed to mobilize Chinese Muslims, particularly Hui and Uyghurs, into the insurgency. Established in July 2015, the group was led by Abu Abdul Hamza Al Turkistani, a Chinese Muslim operating in Syria who received instructions from ISIS leadership to set up a new group aimed at recruiting Chinese Muslims, particularly Huis. While negotiating with the East Turkestan Islamic Movement (ETIM) over a potential merger, the ISIS leadership recognized the Gansu Hui Group in August 2015. The group, not officially designated as a 'component group,' claimed 118 members in Afghanistan and Pakistan by July 2016, primarily composed of Uyghurs with only a fraction being Huis. Despite its modest size, the group played a role in negotiations with other Chinese Muslim factions and external allies of ISIS.

The Gansu Hui Group's formation underscored ISIS–K's strategic interest in appealing to diverse ethnic and religious groups within China, capitalizing on the discontent among Chinese Muslims.

=== Harakat Khilafat Baluch ===
Harakat Khilafat Baluch, a key component group operating within the framework of ISIS–K, emerged as a significant player in the evolving landscape of militant activities in the Afghanistan-Pakistan region. Established on July 13, 2015, through the merger of Iranian Baluchi factions, including Harakat-e Ansar-e Iran, Jaysh ul Adl, and elements from Jundullah, the group swiftly became a focal point for Sunni militants. Led by prominent figures like Abu Hafs al Baluchi and Muhammad Hassan Baluch, the organization claimed an initial membership of 245, comprising primarily Iranian Baluchis, alongside Afghan and Pakistani counterparts.

Harakat Khilafat Baluch played a crucial role in ISIS–K's strategy, aiming to intensify insurgency within Iran's borders. The group's collaboration with ISIS–K signaled a dynamic interplay of regional geopolitical factors, diverse funding streams, and nuanced ideological motivations. Despite its initial numerical modesty, the group's impact extended beyond its claimed membership, influencing the broader Sunni landscape and contributing to ISIS–K's broader goal of establishing a foothold in border regions.

=== Jaysh ul Islam ===
Jaysh ul Islam, a significant component group aligned with ISIS–K, joined the militant landscape in November 2015, bringing a considerable force of nearly 700 members, with a notable presence in Pakistani Baluchistan. Led by figures like Mehmud Rahman and later Maulana Mohammad Tahir Baluch, the group demonstrated an ideological affinity with ISIS, particularly in its targeting of Shi’a communities. The group's focus on Baluchistan and its diverse ethnic composition underscored ISIS–K's strategic commitment to the region as a gateway into Iran.

Jaysh ul Islam's funding sources, which included ISIS-Central, Qatar, and Saudi Arabian private donors, reflected the complex web of financial support sustaining militant activities. The group's merger with ISIS–K exemplified the broader dynamics of regional alliances, emphasizing the organization's alignment with ISIS's extremist ideology and its role in furthering the overarching goals of ISIS–K in the Afghanistan-Pakistan borderlands.

=== Mullah Bakhtwar's group ===
Mullah Bakhtwar's group, a faction led by the former Tehrik-i-Taliban Pakistan (TTP) commander from the Afridi tribe, emerged on the militant scene in early 2016 and later joined forces with ISIS–K. With a claimed membership of 400 individuals, the group comprised Pakistanis, freshly recruited Afghans, and Central Asians from various extremist groups. Mullah Bakhtwar maintained close ties with the TTP and the Tehreek-i-Khilafat Pakistan (TKP), displaying a nuanced relationship with both the Taliban and ISIS–K. The group's opposition to fighting the Taliban and its multiethnic composition reflected the intricate alliances and rivalries within the broader jihadist landscape.

In the backdrop of Bakhtwar's reported support from Saudi Arabia and Pakistan, the group's integration into ISIS–K added another layer to the complex geopolitical dynamics shaping militant activities in the Afghanistan-Pakistan region. Bakhtwar's life was cut short in an airstrike in Nangarhar in the autumn of 2016, leading to the absorption of his group into the TKP, marking the conclusion of its brief existence as a distinct entity.

=== Shamsatoo group ===
The Shamsatoo group was a notable faction that, unlike other recognized component groups, didn't attain official recognition from ISIS–K but played a significant role in the region's jihadist dynamics. Comprising reportedly 400 members, this group originated from Hizb-i Islami, a longstanding Afghan political and military organization. Led by Commander Mustafa, the group, stationed in Shamsatoo Camp in Pakistan, joined ISIS–K in 2015. The decision to not formally acknowledge them as a component group possibly stemmed from ISIS–K's wariness of potential allegiance conflicts and concerns about the group becoming a Trojan horse for Hizb-i Islami's leadership.

The dynamics of this integration involved a unique agreement where the Shamsatoo recruits received senior positions and facilities akin to other ISIS–K members but were distributed among various recognized component groups. This arrangement suggested a level of caution on the part of ISIS–K, aiming to exert control over the recruits while avoiding the concentration of power within a specific faction. Some members of the Shamsatoo group reportedly left in protest against the agreement, reflecting internal tensions. The group's presence echoed the broader trend of ISIS–K negotiating with individual Hizb-i Islami commanders, highlighting the complex interplay of ideological, political, and pragmatic motivations. Factors such as Hizb-i Islami's financial struggles and the desire to counter Iran might have influenced their alignment with ISIS–K.

=== Radical student groups ===
ISIS–K's strategy extended beyond traditional military recruitment, delving into the complex terrain of radical student groups. In 2016, it was reported that the organization allocated a substantial $5 million USD (450 million Pakistani rupees) to influence such groups in Pakistan. Notably, ISIS–K gained traction among students, particularly within Karachi University and beyond, fostering a network that extended into the realm of education. One group, the 'Islamic Students' Movement of Pakistan,' claimed affiliation with ISIS, asserting connections through propagating leaflets and study groups. Although not confirmed by ISIS–K, this group's activities hinted at the organization's efforts to appeal not only to religious zealots but also to a broader demographic, including what they described as 'modern girls, modern boys.'

The university landscape became a battleground of ideologies, with reports emerging of a lecturer at Karachi University arrested in March 2016 under suspicion of attempting to establish an ISIS cell. This incident highlighted the potential infiltration of educational institutions by radical elements. The influence of ISIS–K extended to various student groups, with a notable example being the 'Saut-ul Ummah,' a splinter group of Hizb-ut Tahrir operating in Lahore. Although declaring allegiance to ISIS, this group remained distinct from ISIS–K's formal structure. The complex interplay between militant groups and students revealed a nuanced relationship, with some urban cells seemingly maintaining direct connections with Mosul rather than ISIS–K. The phenomenon reflected the broader trend of militants, previously affiliated with groups like the TTP, gravitating towards ISIS in response to the crackdown on TTP in urban areas.

Furthermore, the students of Jamia Hafsa, a radical madrasa affiliated with the Lal Masjid, openly declared support for ISIS–K. In response, arrests were made of female students engaged in recruiting for the organization. These instances underscored the ideological battle within educational institutions and the potential for such environments to serve as breeding grounds for radicalization. It also suggested that, if effectively linked to ISIS, these urban cells maintained direct relations with the central ISIS leadership in Mosul rather than ISIS–K in the Afghanistan-Pakistan region. The multifaceted engagement with student groups showcased ISIS–K's adaptability and its pursuit of influence beyond traditional military avenues, using educational institutions as arenas for ideological propagation and recruitment. The organization's ability to penetrate academic spaces revealed the intricate challenges faced by authorities in curbing extremist ideologies and activities within educational settings.

== New alliances ==
Following ISIS–K's official establishment in 2015, a number of regional Sunni jihadist groups that did not wish to fully merge with ISIS–K elected to form alliances with the Islamic State's new regional affiliate. Most of these group's ultimate aims rest outside of the conflict in Afghanistan and sought ISIS–K as a partner that both shared a hatred for the governments of Afghanistan's neighboring states and often Shia Muslims. These included Pakistani jihadist groups, Baluchi jihadist groups in Iran and Pakistan, and a variety of Central Asian jihadist groups. A common motivation to ally with ISIS–K among these Central Asian groups was that ISIS–K promised a more immediate focus on Central Asian states, whereas al-Qaeda, an otherwise long-term partner for these jihadists, became so focused on the war against NATO and Afghan government forces that it perpetually put off any serious plans to expand jihadist presence or operations in Central Asia.

=== Islamic Movement of Uzbekistan ===
The Islamic Movement of Uzbekistan (Uzbek: Ўзбекистон исломий ҳаракати, romanized: Oʻzbekiston Islomiy Harakati, IMU) was a militant Islamist group formed in 1998 by Islamic ideologue Tahir Yuldashev and former Soviet paratrooper Juma Namangani; both ethnic Uzbeks from the Fergana Valley. Its original objective was to overthrow President Islam Karimov of Uzbekistan and create an Islamic state under Sharia; however, in subsequent years, it reinvented itself as an ally of Al-Qaeda. The group also maintained relations with Afghan Taliban in 1990s. However, later on, relations between the Afghan Taliban and the IMU started declining. The IMU suffered heavy casualties in 2001–2002 during the American-led invasion of Afghanistan. Namangani was killed, while Yuldeshev and many of the IMU's remaining fighters escaped with remnants of the Taliban to Waziristan, in the Federally Administered Tribal Areas of Pakistan. The IMU then focused on fighting the Pakistan Forces in the Tribal Areas, and NATO and Afghan forces in northern Afghanistan.

The IMU forged a very close relationship with ISIS–K and the Islamic State in Iraq and Syria, much the product of fighting alongside ISIS in Iraq and Syria. Managing to keep receiving support from al-Qaeda, in mid-2014, the IMU became vocal in its support for ISIS, especially as its leaders grew tired of the faltering reliability of the Taliban's Quetta Shura and with open doubts regarding the disappearance of Taliban leader and founder Mullah Muhammad Omar who had gone into hiding. His status would be unknown until late-July 2015 when Taliban would reveal that he had died in Pakistan two years earlier in 2013.

We are tired of the Taliban, we have worked with them for thirteen years and not seen Mullah Mohammad Omar. Not only was the leader nowhere to be seen, but the Peshawar Shura was giving the orders, and the Quetta Shura and Miran Shah Shura too were giving orders... Another reason is that the Taliban became weak and started negotiations with the Afghan Government and foreign forces.

— Interviewed ISIS-K leader in 2015

In August 2015, IMU emir Osman Ghazi joined his colleague Omar Ghazi in a video published widely online, that the Islamic Movement of Uzbekistan was officially part of ISIS–K's caliphate. Although the announcement was pleased by ISIS–K and ISIS-Core, a minority group of IMU fighters opted to maintain their allegiance to al-Qaeda. The alliance with ISIS–K was not permanent. The killing of IMU leader Osman Ghazi by the Taliban in November 2015 (possibly with help from Iran's Islamic Revolutionary Guard Corps) and the Islamic State's continuous series of losses in Iraq and Syria to Operation Inherent Resolve (OIR), compounded existing sympathies to the Taliban (with whom the IMU had been allied for over a decade and against whom ISIS–K perpetrated a number of bloody attacks). By February 2017, the IMU had fractured into two separated, pro-al-Qaeda groups, Omar Ghazi's pro-ISIS–K group, and Jamaat al-Bukhari, a group that had left in 2013 to remain allied with al-Qaeda. On 31 October 2017, Sayfullo Saipov, a terrorist with unclear connections to the Islamic Movement of Uzbekistan, drove a pickup truck down a crowded bike path in Manhattan, New York City, killing 8 and injuring 11 before being shot by a police officer. The incident was described by officials as "the deadliest attack on New York City since September 11th, 2001."

=== Other Central Asian groups ===
Beyond the IMU, between 2013 and 2016, ISIS–K established close relationships with a number of Central Asian jihadist groups including the Islamic Movement of Turkmenistan, Uyghur East Turkestan Islamic Party, Jamaat Ansarullah, Harakat Islami Tajikistan, and the Islamic Jihad Renaissance Party of Tajikistan.

The Islamic Movement of Turkmenistan (Turkmen: Türkmenistan Ýslam Harakatı, IMT) is a subgroup within the Islamic Movement of Uzbekistan (IMU), not based in Turkmenistan (as its name suggests), but aims to bring Islamic jihadism into Turkmenistan, Uzbekistan's southwestern neighbor. IMT was regarded within IMU's pro-ISIS–K group led by Omar Ghazi to be likely to eventually merge with ISIS–K instead of the Taliban. IMT fighters, from their role in the IMU, gained jihadist experience fighting with the Islamic State in Iraq and Syria. The current state of IMT–ISIS–K relations is not well known, however the two experienced a notable drift in 2016 when many elements of the IMT and IMU eased allegiance back to al-Qaeda.

East Turkistan Islamic Party flag

The East Turkistan Islamic Party (Uyghur: تۈركىستان ئىسلام پارتىيىسى, romanized: Türkistan Islam Partiyisi; Chinese: 突厥斯坦伊斯兰党; pinyin: Tūjuésītǎn Yīsīlán Dǎng, ETIP) is a Uyghur Islamic extremist organization, not connected to the East Turkistan Independence Movement (ETIM) secessionist movement, that aims to establish an Islamic state, and eventually caliphate, in the historic region of East Turkistan in China's Xinjiang Province. ETIP, also a close ally of the IMU, maintains close links with ISIS–K who has lobbied ETIP to merge with it and continues to pay ETIP to send fighters to the Turkistan Islamic Party in Syria – a branch of ETIP that fights alongside Chechen and Uzbek fighters in Syria's civil war since 2015.

Jamaat Ansarullah flag

Jamaat Ansarullah (Tajik: Ҷамоати Ансоруллоҳ, Persian: جماعت انصارالله, 'Society of the Partisans of God'), also known as the Tajikistani Taliban (Tajik: Толибони Тоҷикистон, Persian: طالبان تاجیکستان, 'Tehrik-i-Taliban Tajikistan'), is a Tajik Islamist militant movement based out of Afghanistan's Badakhshan Province that aims to enforce strict, fundamentalist Deobandi Islamic law in Tajikistan and establishing an Islamic government similar to the Afghan Taliban's post-2021 Islamic Emirate of Afghanistan. Like other Central Asian groups, Jamaat Ansarullah established a relationship with the Islamic State while deploying fighters to the Syrian civil war. The group, formerly loyal to al-Qaeda, agreed to ally with ISIS–K in 2014 and 2015. The group, which still sends volunteers to Syria, receives 50% of funding from ISIS, 30% from the IMU, and 20% from al-Qaeda. Unlike other Central Asian jihadist groups to ally with ISIS–K, Jamaat Ansarullah appears to value its relationship with the Afghan Taliban over its alliance with ISIS–K (though both more valued than al-Qaeda), likely the result of Jamaat Ansarullah's vision to establish a state modeled off the Afghan Taliban's Islamic Emirate from 1996 to 2001 and 2021 onward. It is unclear if the organization completed its planned 2017 merger with ISIS–K.

Little is known of Harakat Islami Tajikistan, a small Central Asian Islamic jihadist group, except that it agreed to merge with ISIS–K in 2017. It is unclear whether or not that merge occurred.

Islamic Renaissance Party of Tajikistan flag

The Islamic Jihad Renaissance Party of Tajikistan (Tajik: Ҳизби наҳзати исломии ҷиходии Тоҷикистон, romanized: Hizbi Nahzati Islomii Jihadii Tojikiston, IJRPT) is a splinter group of the Islamic Renaissance Party of Tajikistan (Tajik: Ҳизби наҳзати исломии Тоҷикистон, romanized: Hizbi nahzati islomii Tojikiston, IRPT), a former Islamist political party in Tajikistan which was banned from government in August 2015. Once the only legal Islamist political party in Central Asia, IRPT was declared a terrorist organization by the country's supreme court and banned from politics. One of the earliest, IJRPT began establishing relationships with the elements that would become ISIS–K in 2013 with its foreign fighters serving alongside ISIS–K's in the Syrian civil war. By 2016, IJRPT had abandoned al-Qaeda to form an alliance with the IMU and ISIS–K. IJRPT received funds from private donors in Saudi Arabia, the IMU, and ISIS–K, with ISIS–K nearly doubling that of the IMU, giving the former far greater control over IJRPT's leaders and decision making. IJRPT had plans to merge completely with ISIS–K in 2017, though it is unclear if those plans came to fruition.

Our fighters are also with Daesh. So they also want us to join with them. In reality, we have already joined with Daesh and we do many things that are decided by Daesh. What Daesh says, we do.

— Interview with IJRPT member in October 2015

=== Hezb-e Islami Gulbuddin ===
Hezb-e Islami flag

Hezb-e Islami ('Party of Islam') Gulbuddin (HIG) is an Afghan political and military organization founded by warlord Gulbuddin Hekmatyar that fought against the Soviets in Afghanistan and later, (with Pakistani ISI backing), fought against other warlord factions and mercilessly bombed Kabul in a struggle to seize the capital and rule Afghanistan. HIG's brutal attacks on Kabul and dwindling popular support led Pakistani intelligence to abandon the group and instead support the Afghan Taliban. In the early 1990s, the Taliban seized Kandahar, Herat, and, in 1996, seized Kabul and established the Islamic Emirate of Afghanistan, formally expelling HIG from the country while most of its members defected to the Afghan Taliban and later al-Qaeda. After the U.S. invasion in 2001, HIG declared an alliance with al-Qaeda fighting against NATO and Afghan National Security Forces (ANSF), including a number of bombings and massacres across Afghanistan. In September 2016, the group signed a peace deal with the Karzai government in Kabul in exchange for formal recognition of the group and a removal of United States and United Nations sanctions against Hekmatyar. Hezb-e Islami Gulbuddin (HIG) pursued a unique vision for Afghanistan that stood in contrast to the Afghan Taliban's strong emphasis on tribal governance. While the Taliban aimed for a Pashtun government based on tribal structures, HIG sought to establish a post-tribal unified Islamic state. This distinction underscored HIG's vision for a governance model that transcended traditional tribal structures in favor of a more unified Islamic framework.

From 2015 to mid 2016, ISIS–K and Hezb-e Islami formed ties with ISIS–K over shared anti-Taliban and strong anti-Iran attitudes. Despite aligning with al-Qaeda, HIG continued to resent the Taliban for sidelining the group in the 1990s, clashes between the two during the war against NATO and the ANSF, and over their different designs for the nation. HIG's anti-Iranian attitudes stemmed from conflicts against the Iranian-backed Shia Hazara faction Hezb-e Wahdat in the Afghan civil war of the 1990s. Sources vary on the strength of ties between the two groups which were very likely fluid throughout the war. At one point, in early July 2015, Afghand and later international media groups began publishing a supposed statement released by Gulbuddin Hekmatyar urging his fighters to support ISIS–K against the Taliban. Days later, a HIG spokesman denied that such a statement had been issued and that the movement did not support ISIS–K. It did become clear that, over time, the ruthlessness of ISIS–K's attacks and the closure of schools in Nangarhar prompted HIG to distance itself from ISIS–K, a separation that would become permanent in 2016 as HIG entered reconciliation discussions with Karzai and eventually signed a peace deal in September of that year.

=== Baluchi militant groups ===
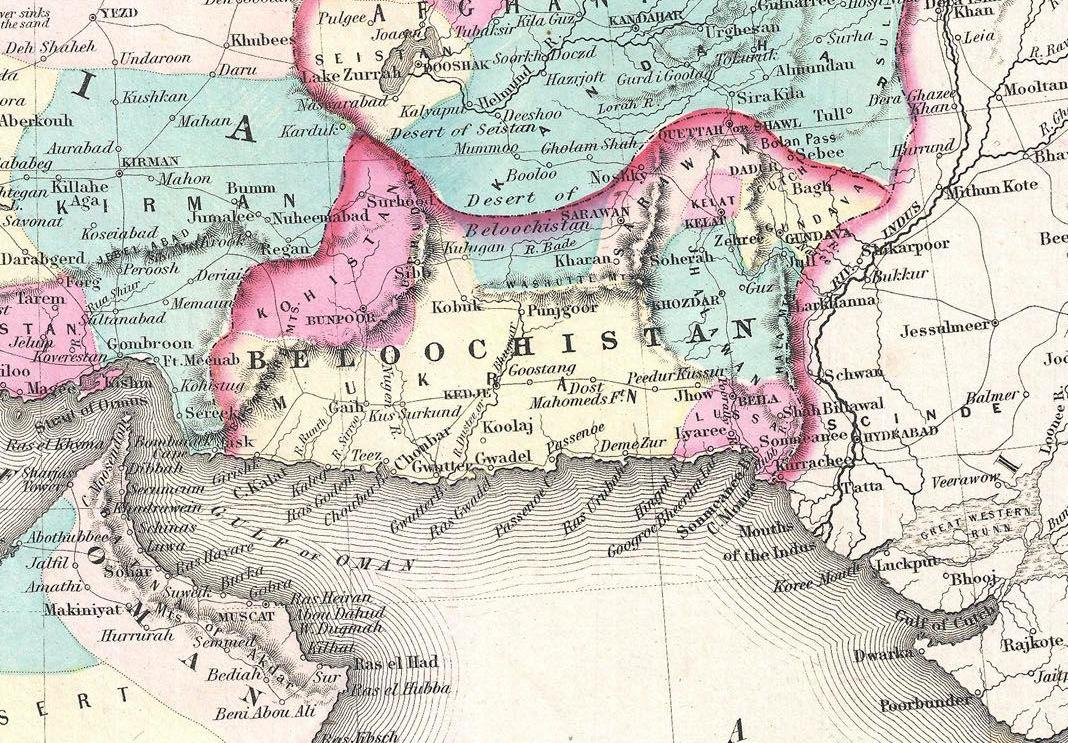
Historic Balochistan

The Balochistan region, stretching through southeastern Iran (Sistan and Baluchestan province), southern Afghanistan (lower third of Nimruz, Helmand, and Kandahar Provinces), and southwestern Pakistan (Balochistan Province), continues to host a number of violent Baluch separatist groups who violently oppose the presence of the Iranian and Pakistani governments within the region, as well as Shia Muslims whom it views as connected to Iran. Among these groups are Harakat-e Islami Sistan ('Islamic Movement of Sistan') in Iran, Iranian Jundullah ('Soldiers of God'), and Pakistani Jundullah, each of whom established an alliance with ISIS–K. Little is known about Harakat-e Islami Sistan. The Pakistani Jundullah, who shares ISIS's extreme hatred for Shia Muslims and history of brutal attacks on Pakistani Shia, described the larger Islamic State as "a brother." Throughout 2015 and 2016, ISIS–K worked to arrange a merger between both the Iranian and Pakistani Jundullah, succeeding in August 2016 with Mohammad Dhahir Baluch, formerly leader of the Iranian Jundullah, as head of the unified organization. This ISIS–K-sponsored merger aided the radical Sunni extremists to challenge Iran in the region and garner appreciation from its primarily Gulf-based anti-Iran, anti-Shia sponsors.

== Beginning of operations ==
IS began actively recruiting defectors from the Taliban who were disgruntled with their leaders or lack of battlefield success. This prompted senior Taliban leader Akhtar Mansour to write a letter addressed to Abu Bakr al-Baghdadi, asking for the recruitment in Afghanistan to stop and arguing that the war in Afghanistan should be under the Taliban leadership. Nevertheless, fighting between the two groups broke out in Nangarhar Province and by June 2015 IS had been able to seize territory in Afghanistan for the first time. After driving the Taliban out of certain districts of Nangarhar after months of clashes, the group started carrying out its first attacks against Afghan forces in the province. Khorasan Province also developed a presence in other provinces including Helmand and Farah. In 2015, IS began broadcasting Pashto language radio in Nangarhar Province, later on adding content in Dari.

In 2016, the group lost control of the majority of its territory in Nangarhar province. It was driven out of Achin and Shinwar Districts following a military operation by Afghan Security Forces while clashes with the Taliban led to it being driven out of Batikot and Chaparhar districts. Following the loosening of targeting restrictions by U.S. forces in Afghanistan earlier in the year, the U.S. Air Force began conducting scores of air strikes against IS targets. In April 2016, the Taliban reported that a number of senior and mid-level leaders of Wilayah Khorasan in Nangarhar Province had defected from IS and pledged allegiance to Taliban leader Akhtar Mansour. The defectors included members of the group's central council, judicial council and prisoners council as well as certain field commanders and fighters.

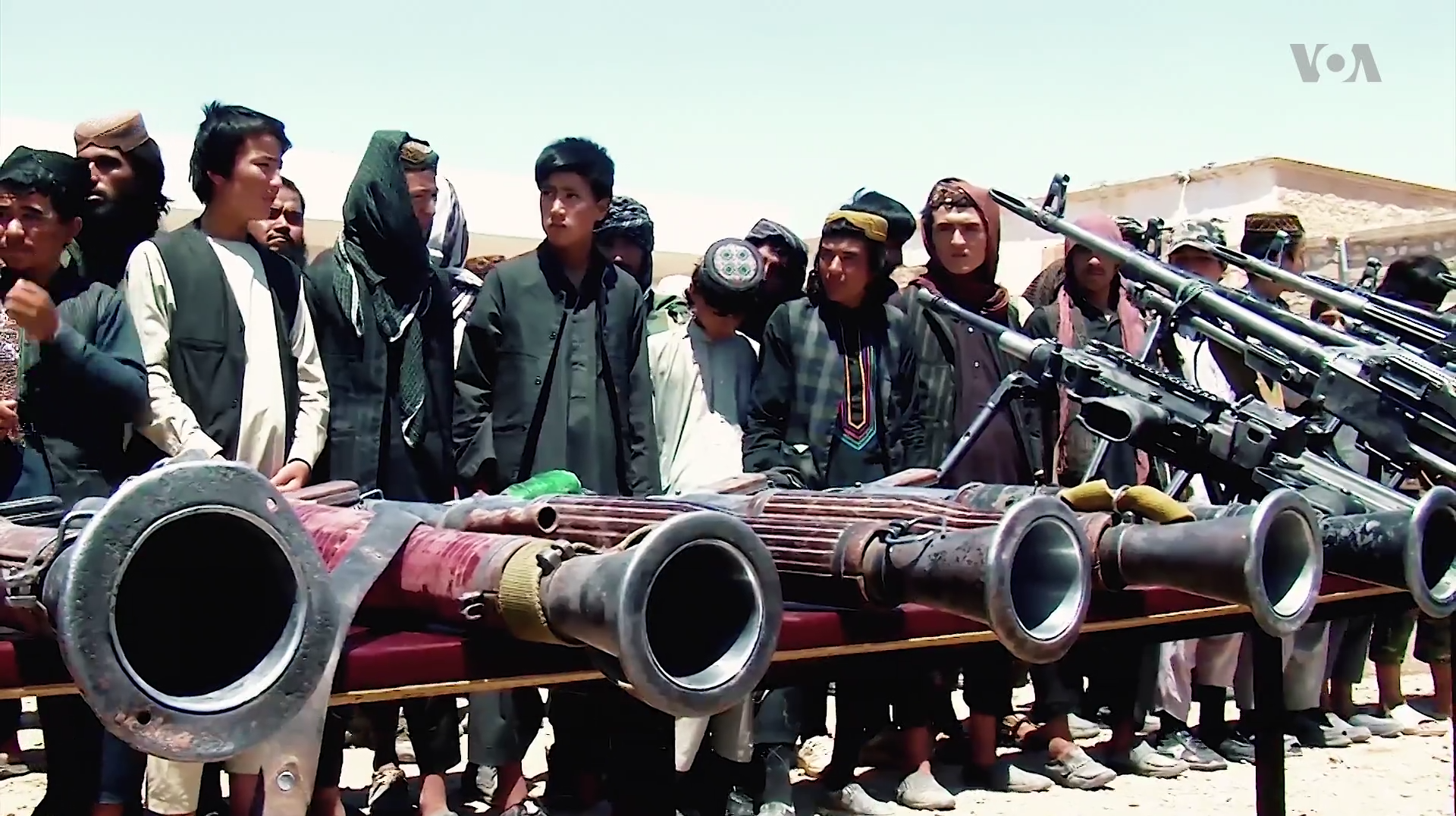
IS fighters who have surrendered after the Battle of Darzab in April 2018

A stronghold in eastern Afghanistan also collapsed as a result of concerted military offensives from United States, Afghan forces and Taliban. On 25 December 2017, in a video of a Kashmiri militant declaring allegiance to the Islamic State and declaring an ISIS–K Province in Kashmir, the fighter called on Ansar Ghazwat-ul-Hind to ally with or give allegiance to IS and wage jihad in Kashmir against the Indian government but the group declined.

== Major relations ==
The political landscape of Afghanistan is key to understanding the dynamics between ISIS–K, the Taliban, the Tehrik-i-Taliban Pakistan (TTP), and Al-Qaeda.

ISIS–K's approach to the Taliban was marked by a delicate dance between cooperation and confrontation. Initially seeking a non-belligerence accord, ISIS–K aimed to establish itself firmly in Afghanistan while projecting an image of neighborly coexistence with the Taliban. However, as clashes erupted, the prospect of a lasting ceasefire faded, leading to an all-out clash. The relationship between ISIS–K and the Taliban was further complicated by external influences, with Saudi Arabia, Qatar, and Iran playing roles in mediating or exacerbating tensions.

In contrast, the relationship between ISIS–K and the TTP, initially marked by ideological alignment, witnessed a deterioration over time. While early overtures were made, clashes and rivalries emerged, with both groups vying for influence in the region. The TTP's expulsion of commanders sympathetic to ISIS–K signaled a shift in dynamics, and talks between their leaders ended abruptly.

Similarly, ISIS–K's interactions with Al-Qaeda evolved from friendly overtures to heightened tensions. Initially describing their relations as friendly, ISIS–K and Al-Qaeda found themselves at odds, reflecting broader challenges within the jihadist landscape. The declaration of the caliphate by ISIS and its divergence from Al-Qaeda's leadership marked a turning point. Although attempts were made to maintain a ceasefire in certain regions, it eventually collapsed, leading to heightened hostilities.

=== Afghan Taliban ===
Historically, the relationship between ISIS–K and the Taliban in Afghanistan has been characterized by a delicate balance of alliances and conflicts. ISIS–K initially sought a mutual non-belligerence accord with the Taliban, proposing a territorial partition that would allow both groups to operate independently. However, this seemingly cooperative approach masked ISIS–K's longer-term goal of replacing the Taliban entirely.

As clashes erupted, particularly in regions like Achin and Shinwar districts, the Taliban shifted focus to targeting ISIS–K, leading to a large-scale conflict. External influences, including pressure from Saudi Arabia and Qatar, initially deterred the Taliban from engaging in direct confrontation with ISIS–K. However, these dynamics changed as relations between the Taliban leadership, especially Akhtar Mansur, and external supporters deteriorated, leading to a more adversarial stance against ISIS–K.

Notably, within the Taliban ranks, there were divergent views on ISIS–K. While some figures advocated accommodation and cooperation, others vehemently opposed any alignment with the rival group. This internal rift was evident in the Quetta Shura's behavior, where some members maintained links with ISIS–K despite the overall antagonistic stance.

In specific regions like northern Afghanistan, ISIS–K forces, such as Shamali Khilafat and Omar Ghazi group, initially supported Taliban operations in Badakhshan, Takhar, and Kunduz. However, internal disagreements within ISIS–K leadership led to a ban on joint operations with the Taliban. Despite these complexities, negotiations and occasional ceasefires were attempted, reflecting the fluid nature of the relationship.

By mid-2016, ISIS–K adopted a new approach, expressing willingness to coexist with the Taliban as long as they refrained from direct operations against each other. This led to a ceasefire agreement in Nangarhar, where both groups redirected their efforts toward the Afghan government. However, hostilities continued in other regions, underscoring the fragile nature of the relationship.

=== Pakistani Taliban ===
The relationship between ISIS–K and the Tehrik-i-Taliban Pakistan (TTP, also known as the Pakistani Taliban) has been marked by fluctuating alliances and underlying rivalries. Initially, the TTP faced internal divisions regarding allegiance to ISIS–K, with some members expressing support for the newly proclaimed Caliphate. However, tensions escalated by 2015, leading to a deterioration in relations.

ISIS–K's negative assessment of the TTP highlighted ideological differences and perceived corruption within the Pakistani Taliban. The TTP, once a bastion of sincere jihadists, was seen as deviating from its original mission after the proclamation of the Caliphate. The rivalry intensified, with sporadic clashes and struggles over influence in various regions.

Despite occasional non-belligerence agreements, particularly in the Afghanistan-Pakistan border areas, deep-rooted hostilities persisted. The TTP expelled members advocating for ISIS–K, and local skirmishes underscored the challenges of implementing cooperation.

The complex tribal dynamics further fueled the rivalry, with TTP attracting commanders from specific tribes while ISIS–K drew support from others. Tribal affiliations played a crucial role in shaping the contours of this conflict, complicating efforts to establish a unified jihadist front against common adversaries.

The ceasefires brokered between the two groups in Afghanistan faced challenges in implementation, with local dynamics often undermining broader agreements. In some instances, local commanders maintained relations with ISIS–K, while in others, the TTP vehemently opposed the growing influence of the rival group.

=== Al-Qaeda ===
The relationship between ISIS–K and al-Qaeda has been characterized by complexity, evolving from initially friendly terms to heightened rivalry and strategic challenges. In the early stages of ISIS–K's emergence, al-Qaeda sought to maintain good relations, recognizing the potential for delegitimization if portrayed as fighting another jihadist organization.

While ISIS–K initially described its relations with al-Qaeda as friendly, differences in strategic focus and targeting became apparent. ISIS–K aimed at a broader spectrum, targeting not only Americans and British but also NATO, the Afghan government, and groups deemed against Sunni interests. This divergence in targeting and the self-proclamation of a Caliphate strained the relationship between the two jihadist entities.

The leader of al-Qaeda in Afghanistan and Pakistan, Faruq al Qahtani, initially cooperated with ISIS–K, even training Afghan and Pakistani volunteers destined for IS-Central in Syria. However, this cooperation waned, leading to the defection of some al-Qaeda members to the rival group. By 2015, relations had markedly worsened, and ISIS–K's negative assessment of al-Qaeda's role in the region deepened.

In Kunar, a ceasefire was reached in the summer of 2016 between ISIS–K and al-Qaeda, accompanied by a non-interference agreement with the Tehrik-i-Taliban Pakistan (TTP). This accord, however, was short-lived, collapsing in early 2017. The breakdown of the ceasefire marked a turning point, with ISIS–K demanding al-Qaeda's alliance or evacuation from Kunar.

The strategic challenges between the two groups intensified following the killing of al-Qahtani in a U.S. drone strike in November 2016. This event, coupled with ISIS–K's push to dominate areas in Kunar, exacerbated tensions and led to al-Qaeda relocating its forces in response to the aggressive moves by the rival group.
