= Abdul Rahman Ghaleb =

Pakistani Islamic militant and head of ISIS–K

- عبدالرحمان غالب

3rd Wali of ISIS – Khorasan Province
- In office 27 April 2017 – 11 July 2017
- Preceded by: Abdul Haseeb Logari
- Succeeded by: Abu Saad Erhabi

Personal details
- Born: c. 1980's Bajaur Agency
- Died: 11 July 2017 Watapur District, Kunar

Military service
- Allegiance: Tehreek-e-Nafaz-e-Shariat-e-Mohammadi (1992-2007); Tehrik-i-Taliban Pakistan (2007-2014); ISIS – Khorasan Province (2014-2017)
- Battles/wars: War in Afghanistan

Abdul Rahman Ghaleb (1980's – 11 July 2017), known as Abu Sayed Bajauri or simply Abu Sayed, was a Pakistani terrorist who led the Islamic State – Khorasan Province (ISIS–K). Abu Sayed should not be confused with the similarly-named ISIS–K leader who succeeded him, Abu Saad Erhabi.

== Islamic militancy ==
Abdul Rahman Ghaleb was born in the 1980s in Bajaur Agency, part of the Federally Administered Tribal Areas of Pakistan. In the 1990s, Ghaleb joined Tehreek-e-Nafaz-e-Shariat-e-Mohammadi (TNSM) and later fought alongside the Afghan Taliban in Afghanistan. After the fall of the Taliban government in 2001, Ghaleb returned to Bajaur for Islamic studies and was promoted to be a qadi for TSNM. He was close to Mawlawi Faqir Mohammed, a TNSM leader, and joined the Tehrik-i-Taliban Pakistan alongside him in 2007.

By 2011, Abdul Rahman served as the deputy to the TTP leader in Bajaur. He was falsely reported dead after a 2012 airstrike killed the TTP chief in Bajaur, Jamal Syed (better known as 'Dadullah').

=== Islamic State ===
Dadullah was replaced by Abu Bakr as chief of Bajaur under the TTP, and when Abu Bakr joined ISIS–K in February 2014, Ghaleb followed. In late August 2016, Ghaleb was the emir for Nangarhar Province and reported to be a deputy of then-ISIS–K Wali Abdul Haseeb Logari. Ghaleb was a driving force behind the expansion of ISIS–K operations to Kunar Province.

In April 2017, Ghaleb was interviewed by ISIS–K's Khilafat Ghag (lit. 'Voice of Khorasan') Radio and stated that jihad will continue "until conquering the United States, Sweden, and Germany, and converting its citizens to tawhid".

Serving only 2 months and 75 days before his killing in July 2017, Ghaleb has held the shortest tenure of ISIS–K walis. During his short tenure, Ghaleb oversaw few attacks by the group, all with relatively low casualty rates.

Terrorist attacks linked to ISIS–K under Abdul Rahman Ghaleb
Country	Date	Location	Description	Dead	Injured
Afghanistan	3 May 2017	Kabul	A suicide car bomber detonated next to a convoy of NATO vehicles near the U.S. embassy in Kabul.	8 (+1)	28
Afghanistan	17 May 2017	Jalalabad, Nangarhar	Four civilians and two police officers were killed when ISIS-K militants stormed a TV station in Jalalabad. Two militants blew themselves up and the other two have taken hostages. They were later killed by the police.	6 (+4)	17
Afghanistan	1 June 2017	Jalalabad, Nangarhar	A car bomb went off outside the airport in Jalalabad.	1	5
Afghanistan	30 June 2017	Achin, Nangarhar	Seven civilians were killed and five others wounded when a bomb planted by ISIS-K militants blew up in the Achin district of Nangarhar province.	7	5

== Death ==
Abdul Rahman Ghaleb was killed in a US strike on ISIS–K's headquarters in the Watapur District of Kunar Province on 11 July 2017 along with other key members of the group. In a statement to reporters, then-US Secretary of Defense Jim Mattis explained "The significance is you kill a leader of one of these groups and it sets them back... it is obviously a victory on our side in terms of setting them back, it is the right direction." Pentagon spokeswoman Dana White remarked that Ghaleb's killing "will significantly disrupt the terror group's plans to expand its presence." General John Nicholson, commander of U.S. Forces – Afghanistan remarked "This operation is another success in our campaign to defeat ISIS–K in Afghanistan in 2017... Abu Sayed is the third ISIS–K emir we have killed in the last year and we will continue until they are annihilated. There is no safe haven for ISIS–K in Afghanistan."

Ghaleb's successor, Abu Saad Erhabi, was chosen quickly after and would serve until his killing in August 2018 in a combined raid by forces of the United States military and Afghan National Directorate of Security (NDS).

== See also ==
- Islamic State – Khorasan Province (ISIS–K)
- History of ISIS–K
- List of terrorist incidents linked to ISIS–K
