= Abdul Haseeb Logari =

Militant

Abu ‘Umayr ‘Abd al-Hasib al-Logari
- ابو عمیر عبد الحسیب اللوگړی

2nd Wali of ISIS – Khorasan Province
- In office 27 July 2016 – 26 April 2017
- Preceded by: Hafiz Saeed Khan
- Succeeded by: Abdul Rahman Ghaleb

Deputy to ISIS–K Wali
- In office Unknown – 26 July 2016

Personal details
- Born: c. 1980's Kurram Agency
- Died: 27 April 2017 Mohmand Valley, Afghanistan
- Education: Jamia Imam Bukhari

Military service
- Allegiance: Afghan Taliban; ISIS– Khorasan Province (2016–2017)
- Battles/wars: War in Afghanistan; Mohmand Valley raid †

Abu ‘Umayr ‘Abd al-Hasib al-Logari or Abdul Haseeb Logari was a Pakistani Islamic militant who led the Islamic State – Khorasan Province from July 2016 until his death on 27 April 2017.

== Early life ==
Logari was born in Kurram Agency (today Kurram District), in Pakistan's Federally Administered Tribal Areas (FATA, later incorporated into Khyber-Pakhtunkhwa Province) and was believed to be in his mid-thirties at the time of his death in 2017.

Logari studied in seminaries in Peshawar, Pakistan controlled by the Salafist jihadist group Jamaat al Dawa al Quran (JDQ) including eight years at the Jamia Imam Bukhari in Sargodha City, Punjab Province, Pakistan. Jamia Imam Bukhari, named after the famous hadith scholar Muhammad al-Bukhari, was run by Haji Inyat ur Rehman, son of JDQ founder, Jamil al-Rahman. Later, Logari studied for four years at Ganj madrassa, in Peshawar, headed by Abu Mohammad Aminullah Peshawari. Both Jamia Imam Bukhari and the Ganj madrassa are sanctioned by the United States for their connection to numerous Islamic terrorist groups including al-Qaeda, Lashkar-e Taiba, and the Afghan Taliban. The U.S. Department of the Treasury described Ganj madrassa in 2013 as "a school in Peshawar that serves as a training center and facilitates funding for al-Qa’ida, Lashkar-e Tayyiba, and the Taliban. The activities of the Ganj Madrassa exemplify how terrorist groups, such as al-Qa’ida, Lashkar-e Tayyiba, and the Taliban, subvert seemingly legitimate institutions, such as religious schools, to divert charitable donations meant for education to support violent acts."

Logari was reportedly fluent in Arabic, Dari, and English in addition to his native Pashto and Urdu.

== Islamic militancy ==
After his studies, Logari left Pakistan for Afghanistan and spent two years as a member of the Afghan Taliban teaching Islamic law, before joining the Islamic State's Khorasan Province (ISIS–K). Logari served as a deputy to ISIS–K's wali, Hafiz Saeed Khan before being appointed as the group's second wali in July 2016 after a US drone strike killed Hafiz Saeed Khan.

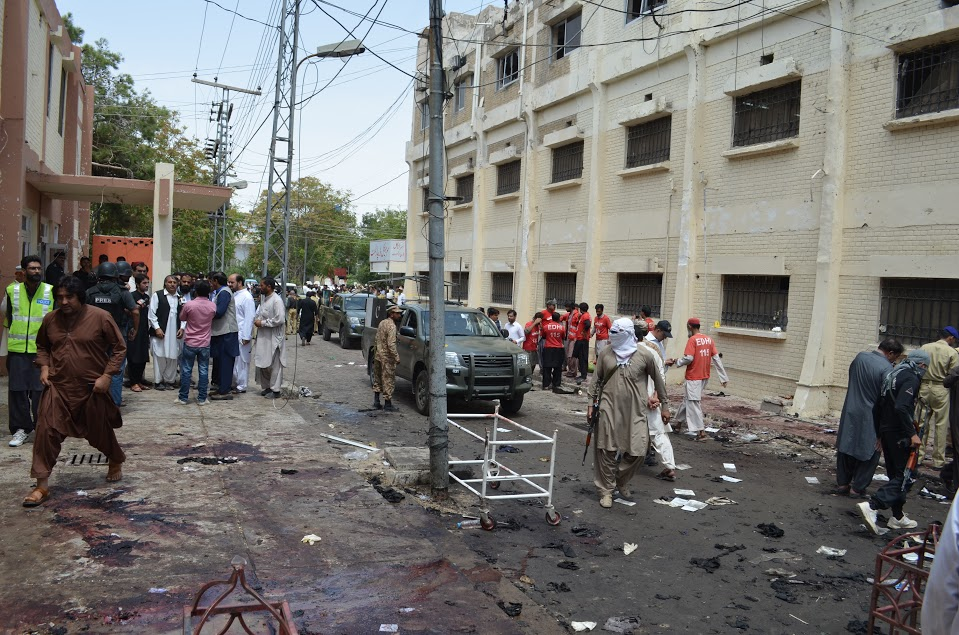
Aftermath of August 2016 Quetta bombing

During Logari's tenure as wali of the Islamic State – Khorasan Province, the group carried out a number of high-profile terrorist attacks. Days before Saeed's death and Logari's succession, the group had orchestrated the deadly bombing of a Hazara (Shia) protest in Kabul, killing 97 and injuring 260, in Kabul's then-deadliest attack since 2001.

Terrorist attacks linked to ISIS–K under Abdul Haseeb Logari
Country	Date	Article	Location	Description	Dead	Injured
Pakistan	8 August 2016	August 2016 Quetta attacks	Quetta, Balochistan	Multiple attackers carried out a suicide bombing and shooting at a government hospital where lawyers were gathered. (Also claimed by Jamaat-ul-Ahrar)	94	130+
Pakistan	24 October 2016		Charsadda, Khyber Pakhtunkhwa	An intelligence officer was shot dead. The attack was later claimed by ISIS-K in a statement posted on Amaq.	1	0
Pakistan	24 October 2016	October 2016 Quetta attacks	Quetta, Balochistan	Three armed individuals carried out mass shooting at police cadets at the Quetta Police Training College while they were asleep. One attacker killed during operation while other two blew themselves up, killing 61 cadets. (Also claimed by Lashkar-e-Jhangvi)	61	160+
Afghanistan	26 October 2016		Ghor	Fighters killed at least 30 civilians after abducting them in the Afghan province of Ghor.	30	0
Afghanistan	26 October 2016		Jalalabad, Nangarhar	An ISIS-K suicide bomber killed a number of Afghan tribal elders.	4–15	25
Afghanistan	4 November 2016		Ghor	ISIS-K executed 31 civilians in Ghor Province.	31	0
Afghanistan	5 November 2016		Ghor	ISIS-K abducted at least 6 civilians in Ghor province.	0	6 kidnapped
Pakistan	12 November 2016	2016 Khuzdar bombing	Khuzdar, Balochistan	At least 55 people including women and children were killed when a suicide bomber went off in the crowded Shah Noorani Shrine in Hub town, Lasbela District, Balochistan.	55 (+1)	102+
Afghanistan	16 November 2016		Kabul	A suicide bomber blew himself up in a convoy with members of the Afghan National Security Forces, near the Defense ministry.	6 (+1)	15
Afghanistan	21 November 2016		Kabul	A suicide bombing at a Kabul Shia mosque "Baqir-ul-Olum."	30 (+1)	15
Afghanistan	25 November 2016		Jalalabad, Nangarhar	Multiple bombs exploded in Jalalabad city.	6	27
Pakistan	10 December 2016		Peshawar, Khyber Pakhtunkhwa	ISIS-K has claimed responsibility for killing a counterterrorism police officer and wounding his son in the northwestern Pakistani city of Peshawar.	1	1
Afghanistan	7 February 2017		Kabul	A suicide blast at Afghanistan's Supreme Court in Kabul. ISIS-K claimed responsibility.	22	41
Afghanistan	8 February 2017		Qush Tepa, Jowzjan	ISIS-K killed six local employees of the International Committee of the Red Cross in the Qush Tepa district in Afghanistan. The assailants also took another two workers with them.	6	2 kidnapped
Pakistan	16 February 2017	2017 Sehwan suicide bombing	Sehwan, Sindh	A suicide bombing at a shrine in southern Pakistan.	90 (+1)	250
Afghanistan	8 March 2017	March 2017 Kabul attack	Kabul	A group of gunmen dressed in white hospital robes attacked the Sardar Daud Khan Hospital.	49	63
Afghanistan	12 April 2017		Kabul	A suicide bomber attacked near government offices in Kabul. ISIS-K claimed responsibility for the attack.	5 (+1)	10

== Death ==
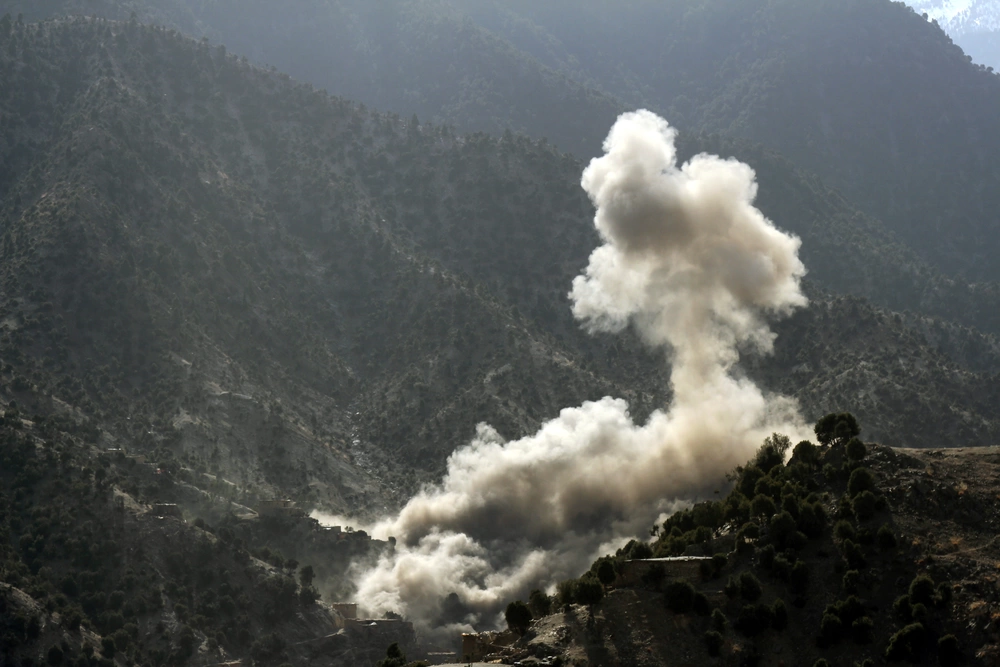
A 2018 US airstrike in Mohmand Valley

On 26 April 2017, 50 American special forces from the 3rd Battalion, 75th Ranger Regiment (United States) and 40 Afghan commandos launched a raid in Mohmand valley, Achin District, Nangarhar Province in an attempt to capture Haseeb at his compound in the area. The firefight lasted three hours, during which two US Rangers were killed, Sgt. Joshua Rodgers, 22, of Bloomington, Illinois, and Sgt. Cameron Thomas, 23 of Kettering, Ohio. A third Ranger was lightly injured.

The US claimed 35 IS fighters were killed along with several high-level leaders, suspected to include Logari, but did not confirm that Logarihad in fact been killed. IS claimed that 100 civilians were killed and injured due to US airstrikes during and after the raid.

On 8 May 2017, the US affirmed Logari had been killed in the raid.

== See also ==
- Islamic State – Khorasan Province (ISIS–K)
- List of terrorist incidents linked to ISIS–K
- Mohmand Valley raid
