= 2017 Nangarhar airstrike =

US bombing of IS-KP in Afghanistan

- Part of the War in Afghanistan (2001–2021)
- Aerial footage of the MOAB striking Achin District, Afghanistan.
- Type: Airstrike, MOAB strike
- Location: Achin District, Nangarhar Province, Afghanistan; 34°04′24″N 70°37′52″E
- Commanded by: John Nicholson
- Target: Tunnels being used by Islamic State – Khorasan Province
- Date: 13 April 2017; 9 years ago 7:32 PM (UTC+04:30)
- Executed by: United States Air Force
- Casualties: 96 ISIL-K militants and 2 civilians (allegedly)
- Location of Achin district in Afghanistan

On 13 April 2017, the United States conducted an airstrike in Achin District, located in the Nangarhar Province of eastern Afghanistan, near the border with Pakistan. The airstrike was carried out using the largest non-nuclear weapon in the United States' arsenal, the GBU-43/B Massive Ordnance Air Blast (MOAB), with the goal of destroying tunnel complexes used by the Islamic State – Khorasan Province (IS-KP).

The bomb was dropped from the rear cargo door of a United States Air Force Lockheed MC-130. On 15 April 2017, Afghan officials reported that 96 IS-KP militants, including four commanders, were killed in the strike; this included Indian, Pakistani, Bangladeshi and Filipino nationals. According to an Afghan Army official, there were no civilian casualties.

== Background ==
The Islamic State of Iraq and Syria announced the establishment of its Khorasan branch in January 2015, which was the first time the group had officially spread outside the Arab world. A few days before the airstrike, U.S. Army Special Forces Staff Sergeant Mark R. De Alencar was mortally wounded by small-arms fire in Nangarhar.

A Pentagon spokesman stated that the MOAB had been brought to Afghanistan "some time ago" to strike the Islamic State stronghold in Nangarhar, located near the Afghan–Pakistani border. The US military found the border regions difficult to control as the Islamic State began developing on the Afghan side. David Martin, CBS News national security correspondent, said that planning began during the Obama administration. Permission to use the MOAB was obtained by the commander of U.S. forces in Afghanistan, General John Nicholson, although it was unclear how far up the chain of command his request traveled.

The Army Times reported that the airstrike was part of Operation Hamza, a joint US/Afghan government operation to "flush" the Islamic State from its stronghold in eastern Afghanistan, engaging in regular ground battles. Stars and Stripes reported that General Dawlat Waziri, spokesman for the Ministry of Defence, said that for four weeks before the bombing, the Afghan National Army Commando Corps attempted to penetrate the area without success, because of the difficult terrain and improvised explosive device (IEDs) planted by Islamic State militants.

The strike aimed to destroy tunnels being used by the Islamic State in Nangarhar Province, which the CIA originally built for Islamic Unity of Afghanistan Mujahideen fighters in the 1980s.

== Weapon ==
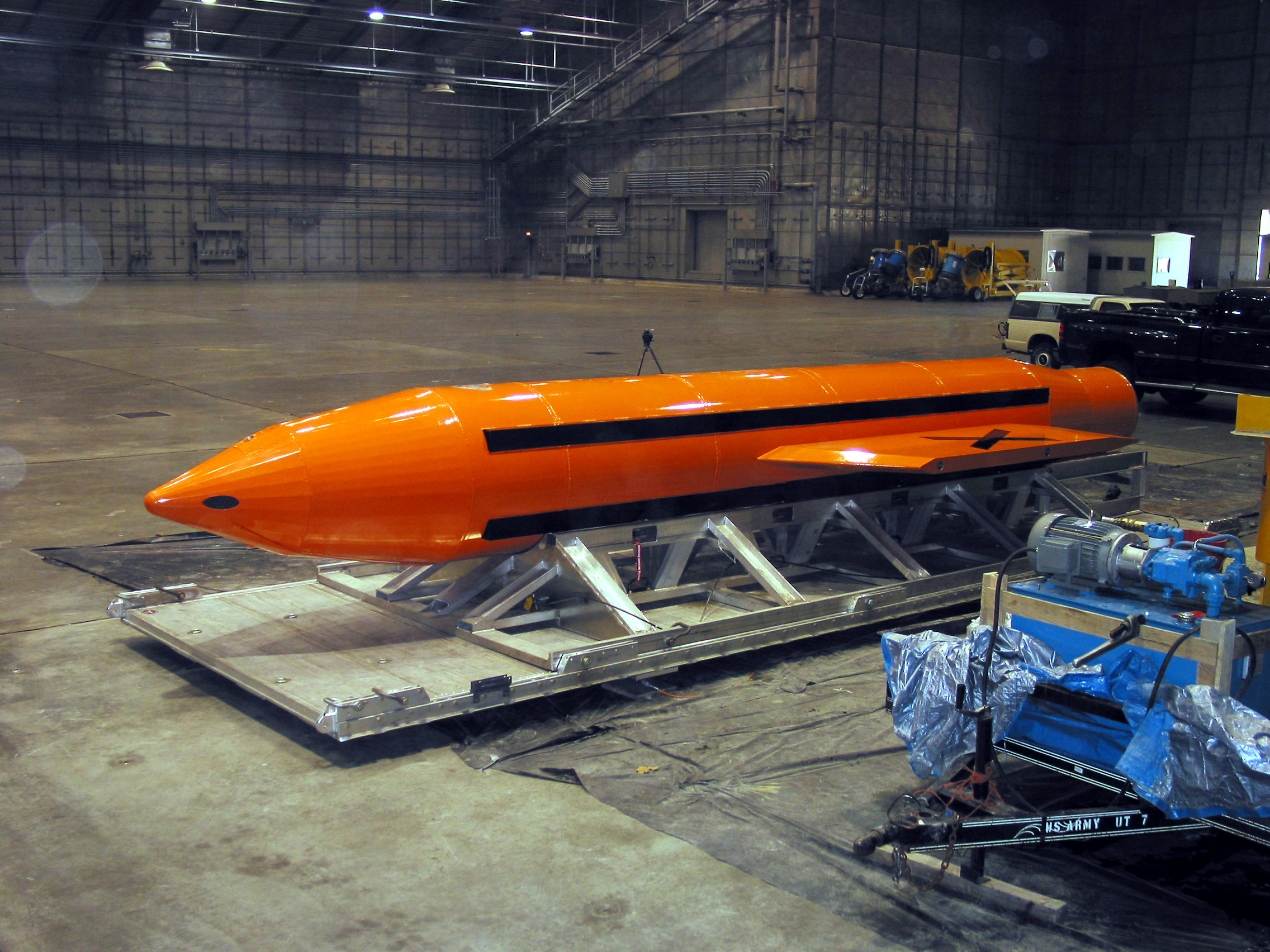
A photo of a MOAB weapon in preparation for its testing at the Eglin Air Force Armament Center.

The GBU-43/B MOAB is a 9,800 kg (21,600 lbs), GPS-guided bomb, the most powerful conventional bomb in the US military's arsenal. It was first tested in March 2003, just days before the start of the Iraq War and is an evolutionary follow-up to the 6,800 kg BLU-82 "Daisy Cutters".

The MOAB is not a penetrator weapon and is primarily intended for soft to medium surface targets covering extended areas and targets in a contained environment such as a deep canyon or within a cave system. The U.S. military has targeted similar complexes and dropped tens of thousands of bombs in Afghanistan. According to Barbara Starr, it is a "weapon that would be used against a large footprint on the ground".

== Airstrike ==
The blast detonated at 7:32 pm local time in the Achin district of the eastern province of Nangarhar, according to the U.S. military. It was reported by The Guardian that "a local security official said they had requested a large strike because fighter jets and drones had failed to destroy the tunnel complex". According to the district chief of Achin, Ismail Shinwari, "the strike was closely coordinated with Afghan soldiers and special forces, and tribal elders had been informed to evacuate civilians.

== Result ==
Aerial Footage of MOAB Bomb Striking Cave, Tunnel System.

The Guardian reported that following the strike, US and Afghan forces conducted clearing operations and airstrikes in the area and assessed the damage.

Casualty figures were initially reported as 36 but increased over the following days as reconnaissance units investigated the site. On 14 April, a local government spokesman and police commander told Afghan media that 82 militants had been killed. Achin District governor Esmail Shinwari told AFP that at least 92 ISIL fighters were killed in the bombing. On 15 April 2017, Stars and Stripes reported that 94 ISIS-K militants, including 4 commanders were killed in the strike. An Afghan army spokesman said after the strike there were no signs of civilian casualties. However, an Afghan parliamentarian from Nangarhar province, Esmatullah Shinwari, said locals told him the explosion killed a teacher and his young son.

On 18 April 2017, one senior Afghan security official said the bomb killed 96 Islamic State militants, among them 13 major commanders.

According to the Afghan defence ministry, fighters supposedly loyal to "ISIS Khorasan Province" were among those killed in the attack. Presidential spokesman Shah Hussain Murtazawi told Media that IS commander Siddiq Yar was among those killed. According to Murtazawi, the fighters in the tunnels were active in the border regions and were persecuting people in the local area. Afghan officials confirmed that foreign militants, including 13 Indians, were also killed in the bombing. The Ministry spokesman also stated that no civilians were killed. The ISIS-supporting Amaq News Agency issued a statement denying that any ISIS casualties resulted from the airstrike.

No immediate reports of civilian casualties were available; however as of 14 April local authorities said the fighting had prevented them from visiting the bomb site near the village of Shodal near the Pakistani border. A local parliamentarian, Esmatullah Shinwari, said that locals had told him that one teacher and his young son had been killed. Buildings in the settlement of Shaddle Bazar, 1.5 miles away, suffered damage from the blast.

Stars and Stripes reported that General Dawlat Waziri, spokesman for Afghanistan's Defense Ministry said that since the strike, the offensive operation in the area was resumed. A BBC reporter confirmed this on 27 April 2017, and reported that an Afghan officer had said there were hundreds of similar caves in the area. The Afghan officer also said that trees 100 metres from the impact point had remained standing.

ISIS denied that any of its fighters were killed or injured.

== Aftermath ==
Aftermath of MOAB Strike in Nangarhar Province, United States Department of Defense.

On 27 April, two US Special Operations personnel were killed fighting Islamic State in Nangarhar region near where the MOAB was dropped. A third U.S. service member was wounded in the fight.

== Reactions ==
=== Afghanistan ===
Afghan president, Ashraf Ghani, said the strike was "designed to support the efforts of the Afghan National Security Forces (ANSF)" and "precautions were taken to avoid civilian casualties", and Afghanistan's chief executive, Dr. Abdullah, similarly said the bombing was conducted in coordination with Afghan forces and that the Afghan government "took great care to avoid civilian harm".

However, Afghanistan's former president Hamid Karzai condemned the attacks in a series of tweets saying "This is not the war on terror but the inhuman and most brutal misuse of our country as testing ground for new and dangerous weapons."

The mayor of Achin, Naweed Shinwari said, "There is no doubt that ISIS are brutal and that they have committed atrocities against our people. But I don't see why the bomb was dropped." The Afghan ambassador to Pakistan in Islamabad, Omar Zakhilwal, echoed this sentiment stating that the airstrike was "reprehensible and counterproductive".

=== United States ===
United States President Donald Trump did not say whether he specifically authorized the use of the MOAB, simply remarking he has given the military "total authorization" and praising the US military as the greatest in the world: "We have given them total authorization and that's what they're doing and frankly that's why they've been so successful lately". Regardless of intent, the MOAB's deployment was widely interpreted as a form of war propaganda. Deputy assistant to the President Sebastian Gorka, in an interview said that the local commander overseeing operations in the Achin district was able to make the choice to use the MOAB on his own authority. John W. Nicholson Jr., commander of U.S. Forces Afghanistan (USFOR-A) and the Resolute Support Mission, said in a statement that, "As ISIS-K's losses have mounted, they are using IEDs, bunkers and tunnels to thicken their defense. This is the right munition to reduce these obstacles and maintain the momentum of our offensive against ISIS-K." Conservative politicians and commentators showed support for Trump's use of the MOAB, including Lindsey Graham, Jim Inhofe, and Pat Buchanan.

== See also ==
- FOAB
- Shock and awe
- Nangarhar Offensive (2016)
- Tora Bora
