= Nangarhar offensive (2016) =

Military offensive during the War in Afghanistan

Coordinates: 36.7333°N 68.8667°E

- Part of the War in Afghanistan (2001–2021)
Date	14 February - 6 March 2016 (3 weeks)
Location	mainly in eastern Nangarhar Province (Achin District, Shinwar District and Kot District), Afghanistan
Result	Afghan victory: ANA managed to recapture 22 villages and pushes IS 8 kilometres back; IS loses almost all of its territory in Afghanistan but returned later

Belligerents
Afghanistan: Afghan National Security Forces; Local militias; Supported by: RS: United States	Islamic State: Islamic State – Khorasan Province

Commanders and leaders
(Islamic Republic of Afghanistan) Ashraf Ghani (President of Afghanistan) (Islamic Republic of Afghanistan) Mohammed Masoom Stanekzai (Acting Defense Minister) (Islamic Republic of Afghanistan) Haji Ghalib (military chief in Achin) (Islamic Republic of Afghanistan) Brigadier Gen. Mohammad Nasim Sangin	Unknown

Units involved
Afghan National Army: 4th Battalion	Unknown

Strength
Unknown	2,500 - 4,000

Casualties and losses
Unknown	200 - 300 killed 100+ injured
- Dozens of civilians killed

The Nangarhar offensive was a 21-day military offensive in February and March 2016, carried out by the Afghan government against the Islamic State – Khorasan Province (IS–K), with the assistance of ISAF and U.S airstrikes. When the offensive ended, IS had reportedly lost all of its territory in Afghanistan and had been expelled from the country.

== Background ==
IS–K was formed in January 2015 after the group pledged its allegiance to Abu Bakr al-Baghdadi and the Islamic State. Early estimates of membership ranged from around 60 to 70 with most fighters coming across the border from Pakistan. Within the first year, membership had grown to between 1,000 and 3,000 militants, mainly defectors from the Afghan and the Pakistani Taliban. Their territory was generally confined to the Nangarhar Province.

In January 2016, the U.S. government sent a directive to The Pentagon which granted new legal authority for the U.S. military to go on the offensive against IS–K. For 3 weeks in January the U.S. military carried out at least a dozen operations, including raids by special operations forces and airstrikes, many of these taking place in the Tora Bora region of Nangarhar Province. American commanders believe that between 90 and 100 Islamic State militants had been killed in these operations. On 1 February, U.S. airstrikes in Nangarhar province killed 29 IS fighters and struck the terrorist group's FM radio station. By 11 February, ABC news reported the U.S. military had carried out 20 airstrikes on IS in eastern Afghanistan in the previous 3 weeks.

== The offensive ==
The offensive began on 14 February, when Afghan soldiers with the aide of US drone strikes managed to kill at least 28 IS militants in Kot and Achin districts. During the attacks, two civilians were killed. Four days later, Afghan security forces continued their operations pushing IS back into Achin, killing a number of fighters.

On 21 February, Afghan security forces under the lead of Brigadier Gen. Mohammad Nasim Sangin captured the Achin district. On 22 February, Afghan security forces reportedly killed 18 IS militants, whilst a further 25 IS militants were killed in a drone strike as they were preparing to attack an Afghan security posts in the Pekha Khwar area of Achin district; additionally, a large quantity of weapons and ammunition belonging to the terrorist group was destroyed.

The operation was aided by local civilians who set up checkpoints to help maintain security in their villages. The fighters later supplemented the Afghan government forces in a more active combat role.

On 6 March the Afghan president claimed that government forced had successfully recaptured all Afghan territory held by IS. The final battle took place in the Shinwar District on the previous day. Afghan government sources reported that at least 200 IS fighters had been killed in the fighting. On the same day, a U.S. Drone strike in the Achin district reportedly killed 15 Islamic State militants.

== Aftermath ==
On March 15, 2016, an official confirmed that IS militants had moved north from Nangarhar into Chahar Dara district of Kunduz province. IS–K still has a small presence in one of Nangarhar's districts and is confined to it and on March 16, 2016, they attacked an Afghan police checkpoint in the province.
