= Chalas =

- Village
- Location in Afghanistan
- Coordinates: 34°47′29″N 70°49′1″E
- Country: Afghanistan
- Province: Kunar Province
- Time zone: + 4.30

Chalas (Pashto: چلاس) is a village in Kunar Province, in eastern Afghanistan. It is a large village situated on the acclivity of a mountain and lies on a river. It lies about halfway between Dara-I-Pech (to the north) and Khas Konar to the south on the Kunar River.
