= Voice of Khorasan =

Islamic State propaganda magazine

- Categories: Jihadism
- Frequency: Weekly
- Publisher: al-Azaim Foundation for Media Production
- First issue: 12 January 2022
- Company: Islamic State – Khorasan Province
- Country: Afghanistan
- Language: English

Voice of Khorasan (VoK) is a monthly English-language magazine published by IS–KPto spread their radical jihadist views and literalist interpretation of the Quran. Past issues have included threats to China, criticism of the abuse of Uyghurs Muslims in Xinjiang, the group's relationship with the Taliban and Beijing's imperial ambitions. IS-KP claims that "the territory of Islam is never limited to Afghanistan, but it is much wider."

It is published in English. The first edition was released in January 2022 and the online print series is published through al-Azaim Foundation for Media Production.

It also attempts to build international appeal, recruitment and incites followers to carry out attacks. It is disseminated through various social media channels to spread IS propaganda to a Western audience, particularly on Telegram.

The first publication in the Tajik language was released on 29 March 2024 by the name of Sadoi Khurasan, and it addresses Tajik speakers and pressure the government of Tajikistan. It is named Khurasan Ghag in Pashto language.
