= Islamic State – Khorasan Province =

Islamic State branch in Central Asia, Iran, and Northwest Pakistan

- الدولة الإسلامية – ولاية خراسان
- Logo of the Islamic State's Khorasan Province
- Leaders: Wali: Hafiz Saeed Khan † (2015 – Jul 2016); Abdul Haseeb Logari † (2016 – Apr 2017); Abdul Rahman Ghaleb † (Apr–Jul 2017); Abu Saad Erhabi † (Jul 2017 – Aug 2018); Abu Omar al-Khorasani (executed) (Aug 2018 – Apr 2019); Mawlawi Aslam Farooqi † (Apr 2019 – Apr 2020); Shahab al-Muhajir (Apr 2020 – present); Known leader: Sultan Aziz Azam †; Maulawi Rajab; Maulawi Habib ur Rehman (surrendered); Dawood Ahmad Sofi †; Ishfaq Ahmed Sofi †; Ismatullah Khalozai; Abdul Rauf Aliza †; Mufti Nemat (surrendered); Qari Hekmat †
- Founded: 26 January 2015
- Dates active: 2015–present
- Split from: Tehreek-i-Taliban Pakistan
- Headquarters: Achin District, Afghanistan (de facto, originally)
- Active regions: Afghanistan; Pakistan; Iran; Azerbaijan; Russia; Uzbekistan
- Ideology: Islamic Statism
- Size: 2,000 fighters in Afghanistan (2025, per UNSC)
- Part of: Islamic State
- Wars: Insurgency in Khyber Pakhtunkhwa; War in Afghanistan

The Islamic State – Khorasan Province (ISKP or ISIS–K) (Note: Arabic: الدولة الإسلامية – ولاية خراسان, romanized: ad-Dawlah al-Islāmīyah – Wilāyat Khurāsān, Pashto: اسلامي دولت – خراسان ولایت, romanized: islami dolat – kharasan walayat, Persian: دولت اسلامی – ولایت خراسان, romanized: dolat eslami – valayat kharasan, Urdu: اسلامک اسٹیٹ - صوبہ خراسان, romanized: islamik state - subah kharasan) is a regional branch of the Salafi jihadist group Islamic State (IS) active in Central and South Asia, primarily Afghanistan, Pakistan, Tajikistan and Uzbekistan. ISIS–K seeks to destabilize and replace current governments within the historic Greater Khorasan region encompassing modern-day Central Asian polities, with the goal of establishing a caliphate, governed under a strict interpretation of Islamic sharia law, which they plan to expand beyond the region through the establishment of a worldwide Islamic state.

ISIS–K is responsible for numerous terror attacks targeting civilians in Afghanistan and Pakistan, predominately against Shia Muslims, politicians, and government employees. In August 2017, ISIS–K attacked several villages inhabited by the Shia Hazara minority in northern Afghanistan, resulting in the mass murder of Hazara men, women, and children within Sar-e Pol Province. Some of its most notable attacks include the 2021 Kabul airport attack that killed 13 American military personnel and at least 169 Afghans in Kabul during the U.S. withdrawal from the country, twin suicide bombings in July 2018 that killed at least 131 at election rallies in Pakistan, twin bombings in July 2016 that killed 97 Shia Hazara protestors in downtown Kabul, and a suicide bombing in July 2023 that killed 63 in Khar, Pakistan at a JUI (F) rally.

While the majority of ISIS–K attacks occur in eastern Afghanistan and Pakistan's Khyber Pakhtunkhwa Province, ISIS–K has expanded to conduct external operations beyond its traditional field of operations. In April 2022, ISIS–K launched rockets from Afghan territory into the country's northern neighbor Uzbekistan, and in May into Tajikistan. In January 2024, two ISIS–K attackers carried out twin suicide bombings in Kerman, Iran, during a procession mourning the US assassination of Quds Force leader Qasem Soleimani, killing 94. In March 2024, four Tajik ISIS–K gunmen launched an attack on a concert hall in Krasnogorsk, Russia, with rifles and incendiaries, killing 151 and marking the group's first attack beyond Afghanistan's neighbors. In June 2024, US officials arrested eight Tajik men in Los Angeles, New York, and Philadelphia, who were reportedly involved in an ISIS–K plot within the United States, with connections to a larger ISIS–K cell being monitored in Central Europe. All eight were said to have entered the United States illegally across the U.S. border with Mexico.

ISIS–K first began with the dispatch of Afghan and Pakistani militants from al-Qaeda-aligned groups to the Syrian civil war, who eventually joined the ISIS caliphate and returned home with instructions and funding to recruit fighters for a branch of the Islamic State in the Khorasan region. The group's traditional base of power began and remains in eastern Afghanistan along the border with Pakistan, recruiting from dissenters and dissatisfied former fighters of the Taliban as well as individuals from South and South East Asia.

== Name ==
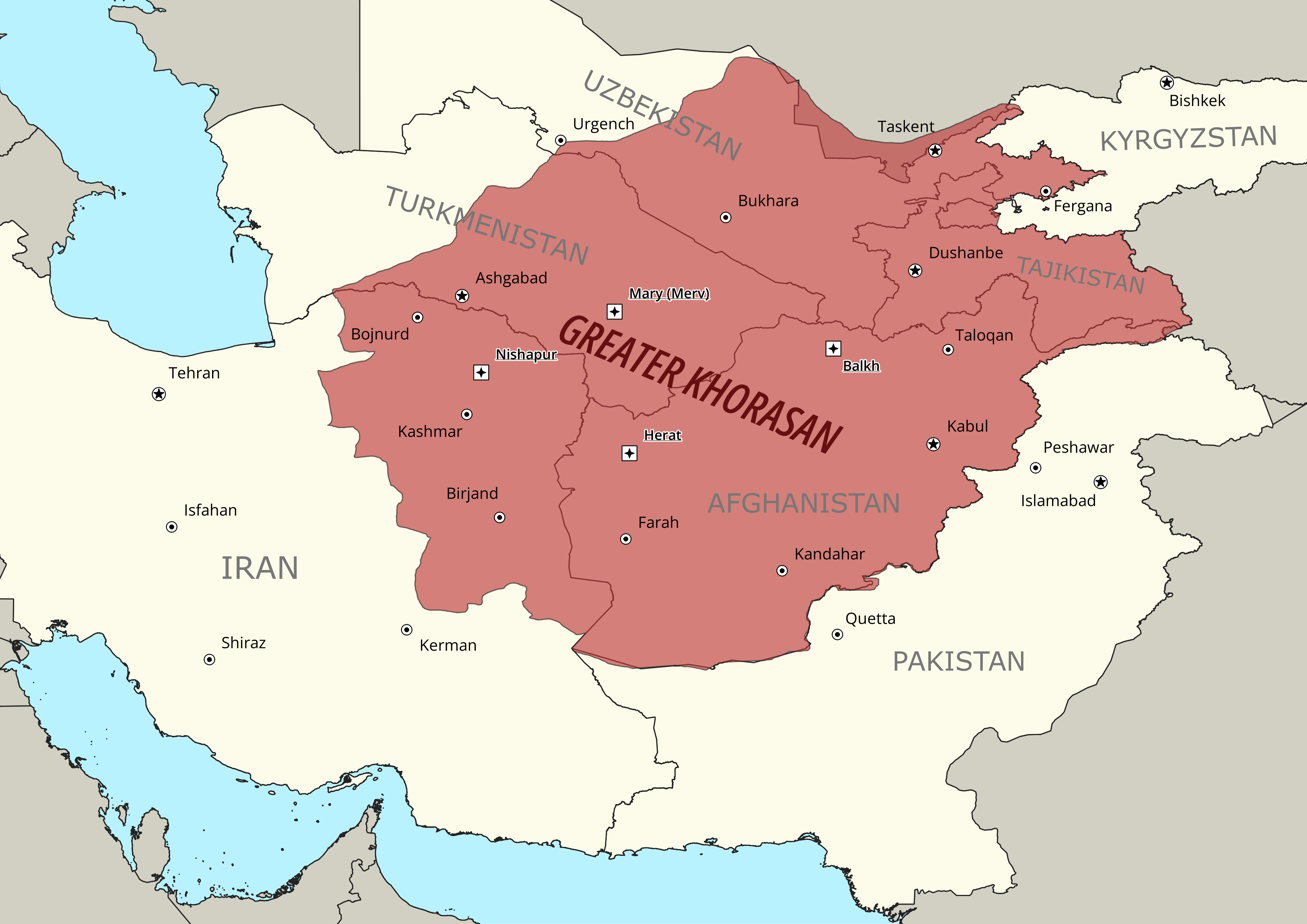
Approximate region of Greater Khorasan

Reflecting the contentious and fluid nomenclature within the larger Islamic State organization, ISIS–K is referred to by various names. The larger organization has shifted between names such as the Islamic State of Iraq and Syria (ISIS), Islamic State of Iraq and the Levant (ISIL), Islamic State of Iraq and as-Sham (ISIS), and later simply the Islamic State (IS). Added to the larger organization's name, 'Khorasan Province' varies in abbreviation between 'K' and 'KP'. Thus, commonly used English abbreviations for the group include ISIS–K, ISIL–K, IS–K, ISIS–KP, ISIL–KP, IS–KP, ISISK, ISK, and ISKP.

Colloquially, especially in southwest and south-central Asia, the group is referred to by the Arabic acronym of the larger Islamic State: Daesh or Dāʿish (داعش), which stands for ad-Dawlah al-Islamīyah fī l-ʻIrāq wa ash-Shām). This name is considered derogatory in Arabic-speaking Iraq and Syria, as it resembles the words Daes (دَعَسَ, lit. 'to trample', 'to run over') and Dāhis (دَاحِس, lit. 'one who causes discord'). The name 'Daesh' is also used in the area of ISIS–K's operations, including among Farsi, Dari, Pashto, Balochi, and Urdu speakers. In interviews with western researchers and journalists, ISIS–K members and heads alike use the term 'Daesh' to describe the movement, despite its derogatory connotations.

The term 'Wilayah', translated as 'Province' comes from the Arabic term for an administrative subdivision, led by a wali (governor), the primary subdivision of historic Islamic caliphates. The Islamic State uses the term Wilayat for each of its regional branches, such as Islamic State – West Africa Province (ISWAP).

The term 'Khorasan' refers to Greater Khorasan, a historical eastern region of the Iranian Plateau between Western and Central Asia. Khorasan was first established as a region under the Persian Sasanian Empire and expanded under the Umayyad Caliphate. Today, the lands of the Khorasan region include northeastern Iran, most of Afghanistan, and the southern areas of Central Asia. The Greater Khorasan region is not to be confused with similarly named North, South, and Razavi (Central) Khorasan Provinces of modern Iran.

ISIS–K's first wali, Hafiz Saeed Khan, in a 2016 interview featured in the Islamic State's 13th issue of the magazine Dabiq, described the region of Khorasan and its significance:

Wilāyat Khurāsān has great importance to Islam and the Muslims. It had once been under the authority of the Muslims, along with the regions surrounding it. Afterwards, the secularist and Rāfidī [rejectionists, Shia] murtaddīn [apostates] conquered some of these regions, and the cow-worshipping Hindus and atheist Chinese conquered other nearby regions, as is the case in parts of Kashmir and Turkistan. So the Wilāyah, by Allah’s permission, is a gate to re-conquering all these regions until they are ruled once more by Allah’s law, and so the territory of the blessed Khilāfah [caliphate] is expanded.

— Hafiz Saeed Khan

== History ==
=== Background ===
Prior to the official establishment of ISIS–K in 2015, a number of Islamic militant jihadist groups operated in South and Central Asia, seeking to supplant existing governments with a more fundamentalist, Islamist government. These groups fought against the governments of Iran, Turkmenistan, Uzbekistan, Tajikistan, Pakistan, and China, most with support from al-Qaeda which had operated with a base of operations in Afghanistan and Pakistan since 1988. In response to failed negotiations with the Taliban following the 11 September 2001 attacks by al-Qaeda against the United States, the U.S. overthrew the Taliban regime in Afghanistan and launched a military campaign against al-Qaeda and Taliban militants who fought to reclaim the country. The insurgent conflict became a focal point for jihadism in the Khorasan region with nearly every jihadist group in the region taking part to varying degrees.

Later in 2003, the United States overthrew the Ba’athist government of Iraq and its leader, Saddam Hussein. Jamat al-Tawhid wa al-Jihad ('Organization of Monotheism and Jihad'), led by Jordanian Salafist jihadist Abu Musab al-Zarqawi, quickly gained notoriety for bloody attacks on Shia mosques, civilians, Iraqi government, American, and foreign troops. In 2004, Zarqawi swore allegiance to Osama bin Laden and the group became part of Ayman al-Zawahiri's campaign against the United States, becoming known as al-Qaeda in Iraq or AQI. Under the 2007 surge of American troops in Iraq, AQI was diminished until 2011 when the group newly under the leadership of Abu Bakr al-Baghdadi, began to reemerge and spread into the nascent Syrian civil war. Capturing a number of cities in Iraq and Syria, notably Raqqa, Fallujah, Mosul, Tikrit, Ramadi, Aleppo, the Islamic State of Iraq and Syria (rebranded later to 'Islamic State') declared an Islamic caliphate in 2014 with al-Baghdadi as caliph.

By 2010, the Taliban resistance had become weakened under the stresses of factionalism, and the Taliban had lost credibility with many of the jihadist groups for its attempts to negotiate with NATO forces. In contrast, the outbreak of the Syrian Civil War in March 2011 shifted the attention of jihadists from the Afghan jihad to the Levant. With jihadist groups flocking to take part in the conflict, al-Qaeda's branches in Afghanistan and Pakistan began lobbying to send groups of fighters to join the Syrian jihad, a measure to demonstrate to the world that al-Qaeda was still actively involved in a global jihad, especially as donor states' interest in the Afghan jihad faded in favor of the surging ISIS campaign in Syria. Although al-Qaeda-linked Afghan and Pakistani jihadists had traveled to fight in the Levant as early as 2003, most groups had been small in number and quickly integrated into assorted ISIS units.

=== Formation ===
On 14 July 2012, Hafiz Saeed Khan, a prominent Pakistani Taliban (TTP) leader, agreed to rapidly assemble a group of 143 Afghan and Pakistani volunteer fighters for Al-Qaeda to dispatch them to join the al-Nusra Front in Syria. Similarly, as the Taliban's Quetta Shura and leadership council (Rahbari Shura) refused to send fighters to Syria, the Taliban's Peshawar Shura and semi-autonomous Miran Shura (better known as the Haqqani network) arranged a deal between Sirajuddin Haqqani and ISIS-leader Abu Bakr al-Baghdadi to deploy Afghan and Pakistani jihadists to the Syrian conflict on salaries of $800 a month, four times that of Taliban fighters. Most importantly, these jihadist units fought as organized groups and would eventually be brought back to Afghanistan and Pakistan, which was unlike previous groups which were assimilated into local jihadist groups fighting in Syria. Deployments of groups by Al-Qaeda in the Indian Subcontinent and by parts of the Taliban quickly made a remarkable impact on the Syrian conflict. From 2012 through 2014, the ranks of Afghans and Pakistanis in ISIS grew massively with at least 1,000 volunteers deployed by TTP alone.

Appreciative of the volunteer fighters supplied by groups in Afghanistan and Pakistan, the ISIS Military Commission in Syria offered ten TTP and Taliban volunteer group leaders, from Saeed Khan's first dispatch, $1 million to proselytize for the movement when they returned to Afghanistan and Pakistan. Beginning in November 2013, these group leaders began approaching members of each militant group including the Afghan Taliban, Tehreek-e-Taliban Pakistan, Islamic Movement of Uzbekistan, Lashkar-e-Taiba, Lashkar-e-Jhangvi, and others to join the effort. These ten commanders would become ISIS–K's early senior figures, including Sheikh Mohsin and Sa'ad Emarati who would become ISIS–K's first emirs of Kunar and Logar Province, respectively. In support of the growing movement, the Haqqani Network and Peshawar Shura, established two training camps in Waziristan and Kunar to teach militants combat skills, vet militants, and provide elementary Arabic language lessons. Once complete, these fighters would transit across Iran and Turkey to reach Syria, mostly posing as economic migrants, or on commercial flights for more senior leaders. At the time, commanders found it fairly easy to motivate fighters to join the fight in Syria, as most assumed their former organization would eventually sign a peace deal with the Afghan or Pakistani government, and because the money was more attractive than the region's faltering Taliban donors. One senior ISIS–K member noted in June 2015 "many Arab countries support Daesh: Saudi Arabia, Qatar, UAE, and others. They also have a lot of natural resources under their control, like oil wells." Beginning in mid-2013, the groups' leaders began to swear allegiance to Abu Bakr al-Baghdadi, the caliph of the Islamic State, though it remains unclear how the militant's original organizations viewed these newly sworn allegiances or if others opted to remain loyal to Al-Qaida's Al-Nusra Front.

Through early 2014, even before the Islamic State would officially separate from Al-Qaeda and declare a caliphate in Iraq and Syria, al-Baghdadi (caliph of ISIS), Muslim Turkmani (deputy emir), and Abu Omar al-Shishani (senior commander in Raqqa) had been strongly advocating that the volunteers set up a new branch (wilayah) in Afghanistan and Pakistan with the territories of Iran and Central Asia as later goals. On 3 April 2014, al-Shishani appointed Qari Wali Rahman, an Afghan from Baghlan, who had been fighting in Syria since 2013, to be the Islamic State's special representative for Afghanistan and Pakistan.

Even though the Islamic State had agreed to the establishment of a branch in Khorasan, and though a single, special representative to the new branch had been named, the groups of volunteers from the Khorasan region (primarily Afghanistan, Pakistan, and Uzbekistan) were still disunited and dispersed. Only in 2014, had the groups began to form larger organizations and coalesce around a few key commanders. These groups were Tehrik-e-Khilafat Khorasan (TKK), Khilafat Afghan and Muslim Dost's group, Azizullah Haqqani's group, and Tehrik-e-Khilafat Pakistan (TKP), the first three of which existed in Afghanistan and TKP in Pakistan.

In January 2015, the three groups, varyingly recruiting from the Afghan Taliban, Haqqani network, and Pakistani Taliban, merged into the larger Islamic State – Khorasan Province with Hafiz Saeed Khan as its wali, and was formally announced by ISIS-Central's chief spokesperson, Abu Muhammad al-Adnan on 26 January 2015. Interviews with ISIS–K leaders suggest that it was from that day forward that members of these formerly separate groups all began to refer to themselves as Daesh, Daesh Khorasan, or Khilafat Islami with a strong discouragement for any continued insinuation of separate groups. One ISIS–K member, formerly of Khilafat Afghan remarked "My boss is Mullah Abdul Khadim, from the Orakzai tribe of Pakistan. I don't know who is my boss and we don't need to know that. I only know who my boss is and who the leader of Khilafat-i-Islami is, Amir-ul-Muminin Abu Bakr al-Baghdadi. Daesh is not like the Taliban where everyone knows about their system."

=== Expansion ===
Though ISIS–K, when it was officially declared in January 2015, was the product of the merger of Tehrik-e Khilafat Khorasan (TKK), Khilafat Afghan, Muslim Dost's group, Azizullah Haqqani's group, and Tehrik-e Khilafat Pakistan (TKP), the organization's expansion attracted various other militant groups, including many from Afghanistan's geographic periphery. Notable among these are the Omar Ghazi Group, Shamali Khilafat, Gansu Hui Group, Harakat Khilafat Baluch, Jaysh ul Islam, Mullah Bakhtwar's group, the Shamsatoo group, and radical student groups in Pakistan and eastern Afghanistan. Beyond the incorporation of smaller militant groups, the newly ordained ISIS–K forged significant alliances with other Sunni jihadist movements in the region to include the Islamic Movement of Uzbekistan (IMU), Islamic Movement of Turkmenistan (IMT), Uyghur East Turkestan Islamic Party (ETIP), Jamaat Ansarullah, Harakat Islami Tajikistan, and the Islamic Jihad Renaissance Party of Tajikistan (IJRPT), Hezb-e Islami Gulbuddin, and Balochi militant groups including the Pakistani Jundullah movement and Iranian Jundullah movement, which ISIS–K united. These groups shared with ISIS–K a violent opposition to Shia Muslims and the desire to replace existing secular and democratic institutions in the region with a powerful Islamic state. Many of these groups, prior to the establishment of ISIS–K, relied on limited support from al-Qaeda, which by the time of ISIS–K's founding had been dismissed as too focused and engaged in the struggle against NATO forces in Afghanistan and not on other Central Asian jihadist movements. ISIS–K's perceived influence in Central Asian nations was an important driver for many Sunni Muslim donors in the Arabian Gulf who financially supported ISIS–K as a counterbalance to the threat of Russian anti-Islamic influence in the former Soviet Central Asian states.

On 15 May 2019, IS declared new 'Pakistan Province' and 'Hind Province' branches after claiming attacks in Balochistan and Kashmir, respectively. This suggests that while the Khorasan Province still exists, its self-proclaimed geographical area may be reduced.

By May 2020 ISIS–K territorial control in Afghanistan was reportedly limited to parts of Chawkay District in Kunar province, specifically Chalas village, Dewaygal Valley and Shuraz Valley.

On 26 July 2020, a United Nations report stated that even though the IS branch in Afghanistan had undergone further severe reverses in its former Afghan strongholds of Nangarhar and Kunar provinces, it was too soon to discount it as a threat. Although in territorial retreat, IS in Afghanistan could carry out high-profile attacks in various parts of the country, including Kabul.

== Attacks ==
On 24 January 2018, militants launched a bomb and gun attack on a Save the Children office in Jalalabad, killing six people and injuring 27. ISIS–K claimed responsibility, saying it was targeting Western institutions. In the aftermath of the attack, Save the Children suspended its operations in Afghanistan.

On 17 August 2019, a suicide bombing took place during a wedding in a wedding hall in Kabul. At least 92 people were killed in the attack and over 140 injured. ISIS–K claimed responsibility for the bombing, stating that the attack targeted the Shi'ites.

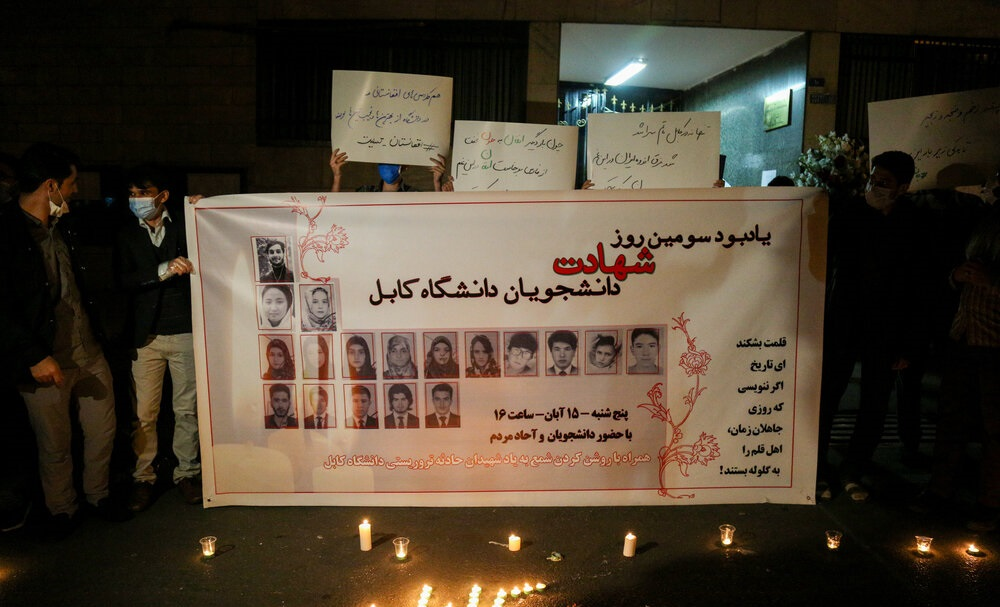
Protest in Tehran following the 2020 Kabul University attack

On 12 May 2020, a hospital's maternity ward in Kabul and a funeral in Kuz Kunar were attacked, resulting in the deaths of 56 people and injuries of 148 others, including newborn babies, mothers, nurses, and mourners. The U.S. government said that ISIS–K conducted the May 2020 Afghanistan attacks, not the Taliban, but this assertion was rejected by the republican Afghan government.

On 2 November 2020, more than 32 people were killed and 50 others injured in an attack on Kabul University. The ISIS–K claimed responsibility for the attack.

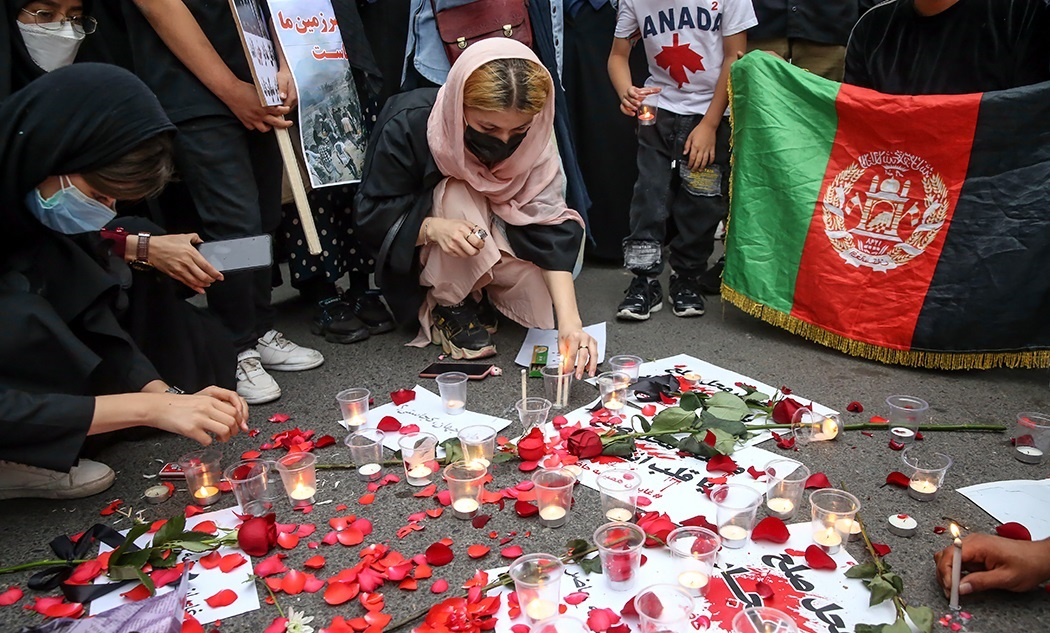
Gathering outside Afghan embassy in Tehran to condemn the 2021 Kabul school bombing

On 26 August 2021, an ISIS–K suicide bomber attacked Hamid Karzai International Airport in Kabul, killing over 170 people, including 28 Taliban members and 13 U.S. military personnel. Amidst the Taliban advance on Kabul in preceding weeks, hundreds to thousands of ISIS–K prisoners had been released or otherwise escaped from detention, leading to U.S. fears of attacks on the airport and future targets. After the attack, the Taliban announced that they would curtail the operations of ISIS–K and capture its leader Shahab al-Muhajir.

On 6 September 2022, the Human Rights Watch reported that since the Taliban took over Afghanistan in August 2021, the ISIS–K has claimed responsibility for 13 attacks against Hazaras and has been linked to at least 3 more, killing and injuring at least 700 people. The Islamic State affiliate has repeatedly attacked Hazaras and other religious minorities at mosques, schools, and workplaces. ISIS–K claimed responsibility for the bombing of the Russian embassy in Kabul in September 2022.

=== External operations ===
The majority of ISIS–K attacks have been based in Afghanistan, traditionally the group's primary base of operations. Since the close of the NATO presence in Afghanistan and the subsequent military takeover by the Taliban, the group has increased its presence across the border in Khyber Pakhtunkhwa Province (KPK), where it has launched an increasing share of its attacks.

ISIS–K's first external operation (operations beyond its conventional area of operations) came on 18 April 2022, during the Islamic holy month of Ramadan, when the group launched ten rockets out of a Katyusha launcher from northern Afghanistan, over the Amu Darya (Oxus) river into the Uzbek border city of Termez. ISIS-Central published the account in its an-Naba Newsletter, Issue #335, and released video of the launch via the organization's Amaq News Agency. In an-Naba, ISIS claimed the attack was conducted as part of the larger organization's 'Raid of Revenge for the Two Sheikhs', in which a number of its subordinate provinces conducted a cumulative 245 attacks between 17 April and 1 May in stated revenge for the 3 February 2022 U.S. counterterrorism operation killing ISIS's caliph (and successor to the recently killed Abu Bakr al-Baghdadi) Abu Ibrahim al-Hashimi al-Qurashi and the November 2021 U.S. airstrike killing ISIS chief spokesman, Abu Hamza Al-Qurashi. The Uzbek Ministry of Defense and Afghan Taliban both denied reports of the attack.

Shortly after the attack against Uzbekistan, on 7 May, ISIS–K conducted its second external operation against Tajikistan. According to ISIS-Central's an-Naba newsletter's 338th issue, the group launched seven rockets from a Katyusha launcher from the Afghan-Tajik border in Takhar Province targeting the "headquarters of the apostate Tajik army." Similar to its rocket attack against Uzbekistan, ISIS-Central published an account of the attack in an-Naba and a video of the operation through Amaq News Agency.

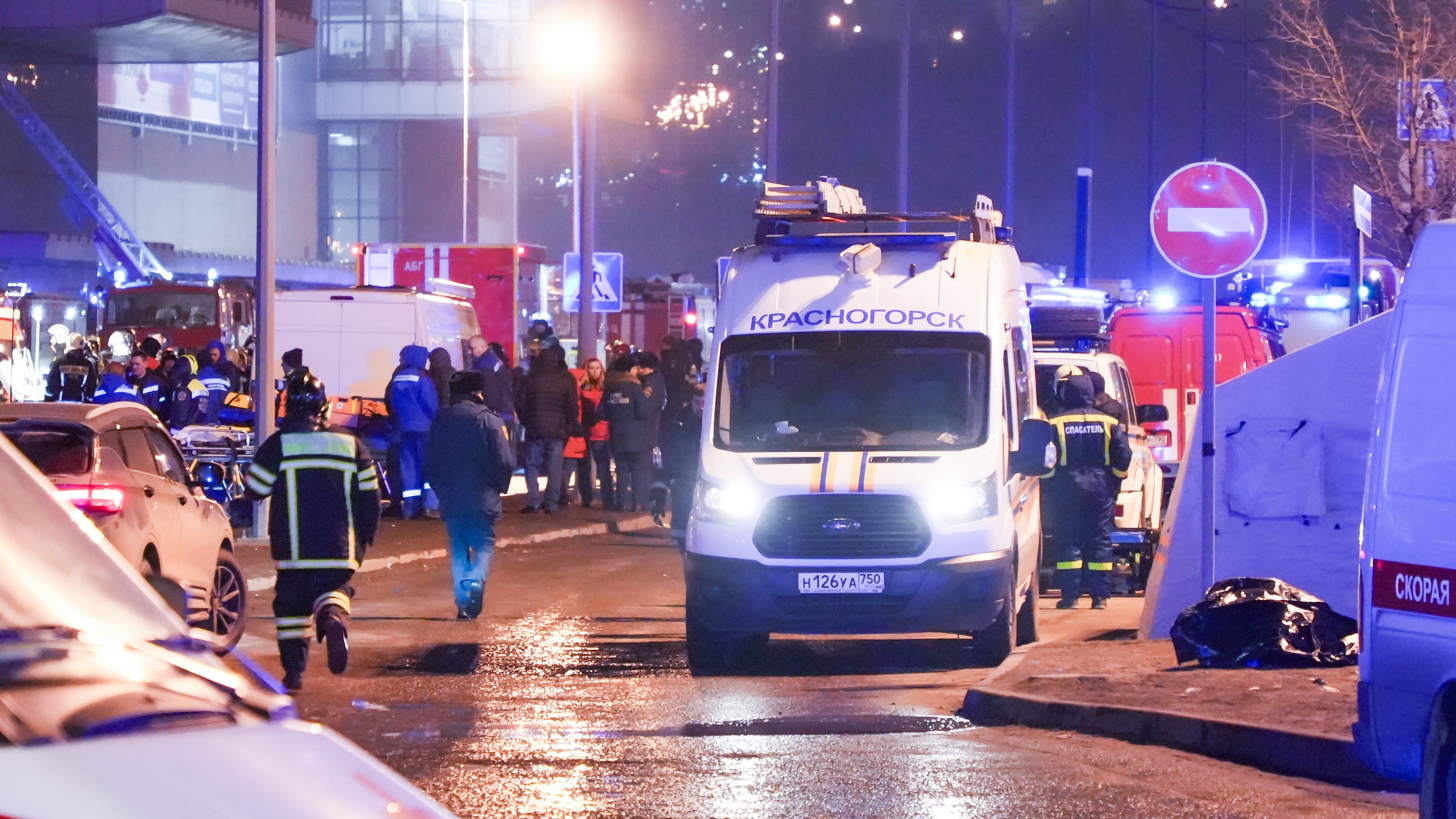
Emergency services responding to the Crocus City Hall attack in Russia on 22 March 2024

ISIS–K's third external operation, the first of which to gain high-profile international attention and produce obvious casualties, was a twin bombing on 3 January 2024 (Note: Attention: 2022 Shiraz attack in Iran might have been the third external attack, as the attacker was ethnic Tajik, and he was allegedly trained in Afghanistan) against a gathering of Iranians mourning the death of former Islamic Revolutionary Guards Corps (IRGC) Quds Force (QF) commander, Qasem Soleimani, at his grave in Kerman, Iran. The bloody attack killed 96, and injured 284. Iran responded by firing missiles into Iraq and Syria to strike ISIS, PJAK, Mossad, and Syrian Rebel targets while also firing missiles into Pakistan to strike Jaysh al-Adl targets. This led to the 2024 Iran–Pakistan conflict in which Pakistan responded by striking at Baloch separatist and Baloch nationalist targets in Iran.

ISIS-K's fourth and most high-profile external operation was a 22 March 2024 attack by four Tajik gunmen against Russian civilians in the Crocus City Hall attack. The attack, claimed by ISIS–K, killed 151 and injured 609 and marked the deadliest attack on Russian soil since the Beslan school siege in 2004, and it is also the deadliest ever Islamic State attack on European soil to this day, closely followed by the 2015 Paris attacks. Putin and the Russian security service, the FSB, blamed Ukraine for the attack, but did not provide evidence for the attribution. IS-affiliated Amaq News Agency published a video filmed by one of the attackers.

On 27 January 2026, Azerbaijan's State Security Service announced that it had arrested three militants affiliated with ISKP who were allegedly planning an attack on the Israeli embassy in Baku.

== Operations by opponents ==
On 4 April 2020, the National Directorate of Security announced the arrest of the head of IS Aslam Farooqi by the Afghan military forces who took him into custody along with 20 other commanders.

2017 Nangarhar airstrike

On 13 April 2017, a GBU-43/B MOAB was dropped in an airstrike on a cave complex in Achin District, Nangarhar Province, Afghanistan. It was the first use of the bomb on the battlefield. The Afghan defense ministry reported it to have killed over 36 militants and destroyed the tunnel complex including a cache of weapons. No civilian casualties were reported.

On 14 April 2017, Pakistan's security agencies along with the local police raided a house in Lahore's Factory Area as part of their combing operation which was approved by Pakistan's Chief of Army Staff Qamar Javed Bajwa in the aftermath of Mall Road bombing. After an exchange of fire which killed one "terrorist", three other suspects were arrested, one of them being Noreen Leghari, a student from Hyderabad, Pakistan who was claimed to be missing by her family four days prior to the raid. On a confessional statement released by ISPR, Noreen confessed to joining IS through a terrorist she met on social media, She also told authorities that she was recruited by IS to attack a church in Lahore on the Easter Sunday, two suicide jackets, four hand grenades and bullets were provided to them. On 4 September 2019, in a joint operation of Counter Terrorism Department, FIA and Balochistan Constabulary at least 6 IS militants were killed in an intelligence-based operation in Quetta's Eastern Bypass area. During the operation, one official of the Balochistan Constabulary was killed and eight others from the Counter Terrorism Department were injured.

Mohmand Valley raid

On 26 April 2017, a joint raid operation committed by U.S. Army Rangers and Afghan Special Forces in the Nangarhar Province resulted in the death of Sheikh Abdul Hasib, the leader of IS in Afghanistan. Along with Hasib, a number of other commanders of IS were killed according to a statement by the U.S. military. Two U.S. soldiers died during the operation, possibly due to friendly fire. On 1 January 2019, Afghan Special Forces attacked ISIS–K in Nangarhar Province's Achin District, killing 27 militants according to officials. Two local ISIS leaders, Sediq Yar and Syed Omar, were reported to be among those killed. On 10 January, senior ISIS–K commander Khetab Emir was also killed in a raid in Nangarhar according to a U.S. forces spokesman. Emir was reported to have facilitated major attacks and provided ISIS–K bombmakers with explosive materials. On 30 April 2019, Afghan government forces undertook clearing operations directed against both ISIS–K and the Taliban in eastern Nangarhar Province after the two groups fought for over a week over a group of villages in an area of illegal talc mining. The National Directorate of Security claimed 22 ISIS–K fighters were killed and two weapons caches destroyed while the Taliban claimed U.S.-backed Afghan forces killed seven civilians; a provincial official said over 9,000 families had been displaced by the fighting. On 21 August 2019, an airstrike killed six militants of IS in Nangarhar province including two Pakistani nationals.

Taliban operations

In July 2018, the Taliban launched an offensive against IS in the Jowzjan province.

2021 U.S. airstrikes

On 27 August 2021, the United States launched an airstrike against three suspected ISIS–K members in Nangarhar Province. On 29 August, a drone attack against a suspected Islamic State bomber in Kabul killed a family of nine, including six children.

A key leader of the Islamic State was arrested in Georgia.

== Funding ==
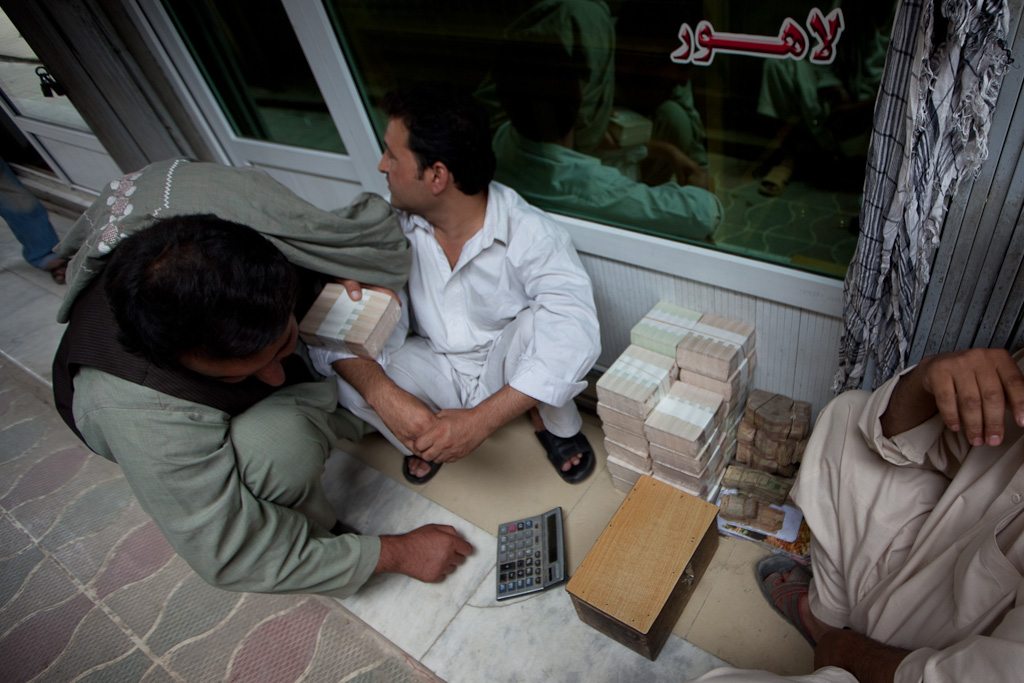
Hawala money market in Kabul

ISIS–K sustains its operations through a complex financing structure that draws on diverse sources.

ISIS–K has benefitted significantly from financial support originating from the broader ISIS network, particularly from the central leadership. This internal coordination allows for a consistent inflow of funds, showcasing the interconnected nature of various ISIS factions. While the exact mechanisms of this financial relationship remain undisclosed, it is evident that support from ISIS-Central plays a pivotal role in strengthening ISIS–K's operational capacity. This internal funding stream highlighted the cohesive financial structure within the broader Islamic State.

Controlled territories became a key source of revenue for ISIS–K through the implementation of a taxation system. The group levies taxes on local populations and businesses, demonstrating a degree of financial autonomy within its operational zones. This strategy allowed ISIS–K to extract resources directly from the communities it governed, contributing to its self-sufficiency. The local taxation approach reflects the group's ability to exploit the economic resources of the territories under its control, emphasizing a dynamic financial strategy tailored to the circumstances of each region.

ISIS–K actively seeks external funding from sympathetic patrons, including wealthy individuals from Gulf countries such as Qatar and Saudi Arabia. Donations from these sources, coupled with collaborations with individuals willing to contribute resources, constitute a significant portion of the group's financial support. External funding not only provides an additional layer of financial backing but also highlighted the global network that ISIS–K tapped into for resources. Moreover, engaging in criminal enterprises, such as human trafficking and smuggling, further diversify ISIS–K's funding sources. The group's adaptability in generating funds from both international and illicit channels showcased a multifaceted financial strategy.

ISIS–K engaged in various criminal enterprises, including human trafficking and smuggling, to bolster its financial resources. These illicit activities served as additional streams of income, contributing to the group's financial resilience. The involvement in criminal enterprises demonstrated ISIS–K's ability to adapt its funding strategies, indicating a level of sophistication in navigating a range of revenue-generating activities.

Overall, ISIS–K's financing structure is characterized by a combination of internal support from ISIS-Central, local taxation in controlled territories, external funding from sympathetic patrons, and engagement in criminal enterprises.

== Analysis ==
=== Taliban – ISIS–K relations ===
Since the Taliban took control of the Afghan central government following the United States withdrawal and the collapse of the Afghan National Army (ANA) in August 2021, the Taliban has been locked in a violent counterinsurgency against ISIS–K. The Taliban-led Islamic Emirate of Afghanistan sought international legitimacy by demonstrating its efforts to curb terrorism and secure national sovereignty over Afghan territory, namely for prospects of international investment to reverse Afghanistan's increasing poverty.

ISIS–K, seeking to establish the Khorasan Province as the center of a greater Islamic State on Afghan territory, principally seeks to undermine the so-called 'apostate' and 'Western puppet' Taliban regime in hopes of once again regaining control of Afghan territory.

Beginning in late 2022 and continuing through 2023, ISIS–K launched attacks on diplomats from the People's Republic of China and Islamic Republic of Pakistan, nations with warmer relations towards the Taliban, aiming to deter foreign recognition, investment, or support to the Taliban government through violent attacks exhibiting Taliban failures to provide security.

Today, ISIS–K is engaged in a protracted, low-intensity conflict with the Taliban government. Though the Taliban and ISIS–K actively fought against the United States, ISIS–K long maintained a greater operational focus on attacking Taliban targets. The Taliban, on the other hand, have made efforts of debatable effectiveness to target ISIS–K militants through violent raids, protect foreign diplomats and investors from ISIS–K attacks, and publicly downplay the presence of ISIS–K in the country to attract foreign recognition and investment, as well as to demonstrate compliance with the Doha Accord.

Despite the continuing conflict between ISIS–K and the Taliban, the two groups have cooperated with each other on infrequent occasions during the NATO war in Afghanistan, primarily by launching attacks on the minority Shia Hazara. In August 2017, the Taliban and ISIS–K jointly launched a major attack against some Hazara minority villages in northern Afghanistan and they brutally slaughtered dozens of Hazara men, women and children in Sar-e Pol Province.

The National Security Department of the former Afghan government stated many times that the Haqqani network and the Taliban support ISIS–K fighters.

By portraying themselves as a counterweight against the extremism of ISIS–K, the Taliban sought to gain international legitimacy and support.

As per the report published by United Nations Security Council’s Sanctions Monitoring Team in 2025, ISIS-K maintains opportunities link with dissatisfied members of Afghan Taliban and Tehrik-e-Taliban Pakistan.

=== Membership ===
According to a UN report, up to 70 IS fighters arrived from Iraq and Syria to form the initial core of the group in Afghanistan. Most of the group's membership growth has come from recruiting Afghan defectors from the Taliban. In Afghanistan, IS has not only been recruiting from the villages but also the urban middle class and specifically targeting the universities, as lecturers in Islamic law as well as students at Kabul University have pledged allegiance to the group.

Foreign fighters from Pakistan and Uzbekistan are also known to be part of the group. Other foreign fighters have included Indians, with 14 Keralites having been freed by the Taliban from prison following the fall of Kabul. The Taliban also claimed that two Malaysians of ISIS–K were caught by them following a gun battle in Kabul on 26 August 2021. Individuals from Myanmar and Bangladesh have also been part of it, and one known Bangladeshi national of ISIS–K was arrested by the Afghan intelligence agency in 2020.

After the takeover of Kabul by the Taliban in 2021, several members of Afghan intelligence agency and Afghan national army have also joined the Islamic State – Khorasan Province.

A report published by United Nations Security Council’s Sanctions Monitoring Team in 2025 stated that there were around 2,000 ISIS-K fighters operating in Afghanistan. The report also stated that ISIS-K had recruited around 600 volunteers from Central Asia, mainly from Tajikistan and Uzbekistan, with some remaining in their home countries while others have traveled to Afghanistan and Europe.

=== Leaders ===
In line with the Islamic State's overall aims to re-establish an Islamic caliphate, like those of the Rashidun Caliphate ruled by Muhammad's successors, Caliphs Abu Bakr, Umar, Uthman, and Ali, the Islamic State and ISIS–K use the same historic titles for leaders. The head of the Islamic State's envisioned caliphate, with Abu Bakr al-Baghdadi (29 June 2014 – 27 October 2019) the longest serving, is known as the 'Caliph' (خَلِيفَةْ) to all members of the organization. Leaders of the Islamic State's regional provinces ('Wilayah') such as ISIS–K and ISWAP, are referred to as 'Wali' (Arabic: والي), often translated as 'governor'. As an example, during the Umayyad Caliphate (661–750 CE) Nasr ibn Sayyar served as the last Wali (governor) of Khurasan Province, appointed under Caliph Hisham ibn Abd al-Malik and serving under the final five caliphs of the Umayyad Caliphate until he was ejected into Persia by forces of the new Abbasid Caliphate (750–1258 CE). Leaders at every level are referred to as 'emir' (Arabic: أمير) which has been variously translated as 'commander' or 'chief'. Emirs serve at various levels to include functional emirs (e.g. external operations emir), organizational emirs (e.g. finance commission emir), or territorial emirs (e.g. provincial emir, district emir).

In 2025, a report published by United Nations Security Council’s Sanctions Monitoring Team stated that the leadership of ISIS-K remains predominantly of Afghan origin, while much of its rank-and-file is now composed of individuals from Central Asia.

Wali of the Islamic State's Khorasan Province
No.	Wali	Birthplace	Ascent	Departure	Reason for Departure	Duration	Caliph
1	Hafiz Saeed Khan (Maulawi Hafiz Saeed Khan Orakzai)	Orakzai Agency	11 January 2015	26 July 2016	Killed in US drone strike	1 year, 18 months, 197 days	Abu Bakr al-Baghdadi (29 Jun 2014 – 27 October 2019)
2	Abdul Haseeb Logari (Abu 'Umayr 'Abd al-Hasib al-Logari)	Kurram Agency	27 July 2016	26 April 2017	Killed in US military raid	1 year, 9 months, 274 days	Abu Bakr al-Baghdadi (29 Jun 2014 – 27 October 2019)
3	Abdul Rahman Ghaleb (Abu Sayed Bajauri)	Bajaur Agency	27 April 2017	11 July 2017	Killed in US drone strike	2 months, 75 days	Abu Bakr al-Baghdadi (29 Jun 2014 – 27 October 2019)
4	Abu Saad Erhabi	Orakzai Agency	12 July 2017	25 August 2018	Killed in US, NDS raid	1 year, 1 month, 44 days	Abu Bakr al-Baghdadi (29 Jun 2014 – 27 October 2019)
5	Ziya ul-Haq (Abu Omar al-Khorasani)	Unknown	26 August 2018	April 2019	Dismissed for poor performance	4 months	Abu Bakr al-Baghdadi (29 Jun 2014 – 27 October 2019)
6	Mawlawi Aslam Farooqi (Mawlawi Abdullah Orakzai)	Orakzai Agency	April 2019	4 April 2020	Arrested by Afghan NDS	1 year	Abu Bakr al-Baghdadi (until 27 October 2019); Amir Mohammad Abdul Rahman al-Mawli al-Salbi (from 31 October 2019)
7	Shahab al-Muhajir (Sanaullah Ghafari)	Kabul City	5 April 2020	Incumbent		6 years, 6 months, and 14 days	Amir Mohammad Abdul Rahman al-Mawli al-Salbi (until 3 February 2022); Nour Karim al-Mutni al-Baidi al-Rifai (4 Feb 2022 to 15 October 2022); Abu al-Hussein al-Husseini al-Qurashi (30 Nov 2022 to 3 August 2023); Abu Hafs al-Hashimi al-Qurashi (since 3 August 2023)

=== Foothold and strategy ===
While the group has managed to establish a foothold in Afghanistan, it has largely carried out isolated, smaller-scale attacks in Pakistan. The group has also failed to establish a foothold in Pakistan because of anti-terrorism operations conducted by Pakistan's law enforcement agencies against the group. A series of successful operations by US, Afghan and coalition forces in Afghanistan against the group has also crippled the group's ability to operate in the region.

=== Designation as a terrorist organization ===
Many nations effectively designate ISIS–K as a terrorist organization as a subordinate element of the larger Islamic State, though not listing it separately. On 14 May 2019, the United Nations Security Council's (UNSC) ISIL (Da'esh) and Al-Qaida Sanctions Committee listed "The Islamic State of Iraq and the Levant – Khorasan" as designated entity QDe.161, the first ISIS affiliate to be individually designated by the United Nations. Immediately following, some states automatically adopted the UN designation of ISIS–K.

Country	Date	Reference
United States	14 January 2016	
Australia	3 November 2017	
Canada	23 May 2018	
India	21 June 2018	
United Nations	14 May 2019	
Argentina	14 May 2019	
New Zealand	14 May 2019	
Iraq	16 May 2019	
Afghanistan	3 July 2022	

== Media ==
ISIS–K is a prolific producer of propaganda, outdone only by the Islamic State's core in Iraq and Syria. ISIS–K publishes and circulates a variety of materials through the al-Azaim Media Foundation (Arabic: مؤسسة العزائم, romanized: Muasasat al-A'zayim) for Media Production, whose status as an official element of ISIS–K experts disagree on as the group has yet to claim or disclaim them. Notably, the al-Azaim Foundation has been known to issue claims of attacks before al-Amaq News Agency, the Islamic State's foremost source for claims of attacks by any Islamic State affiliate. Al-Azaim, which publishes nearly all ISIS–K propaganda, appeared publicly in August 2021 as the US withdrew its forces and the Taliban took power in Kabul. Prior to the Taliban takeover, ISIS–K propaganda was produced and distributed by multiple organizations including Khalid Media (responsible for video statements) and Black Flags (audio and text statements), until their 2021 consolidation into al-Azaim. Content for al-Azaim is often written and submitted by sympathizers and supporters in the region, about 70% of which is originally published in Pashto, however many supporters provide translation services of al-Azaim's content and that of the Islamic State's publications into Pashto, Dari, Urdu, Tajik, Bengali, Hindi, Russian, and sometimes Arabic, Tamil, Malayalam, and Uyghur. Al-Azaim primarily disseminates its content through Telegram, X (formerly Twitter), Rocket.Chat, and others. In 2022, amidst raids by the Taliban General Directorate of Intelligence (GDI) against ISIS–K targets, GDI had infiltrated a number of ISIS–K channels which had temporarily disrupted content distribution.

Beyond books, monographs, videos, and letters, al-Azaim Foundation is best known for its production of regular newsletters and magazines, most famous of which are Khorasan Ghag (lit. 'Voice of Khorasan') magazine in Pashto, the Voice of Khurasan magazine in English, and Yalghar (lit. 'Attack') in Urdu. Although addressing modern events in newsletters and magazines, discrediting the Taliban as religious leaders, political leaders, and guarantors of security occupy the bulk of ISIS–K propaganda.

== See also ==
- List of terrorist incidents linked to the Islamic State
- Finances of the Islamic State – Khorasan Province
- List of drone strikes in Afghanistan
- List of terrorist attacks in Kabul
