= Achin District =

Coordinates: 34.0894°N 70.683°E

- District
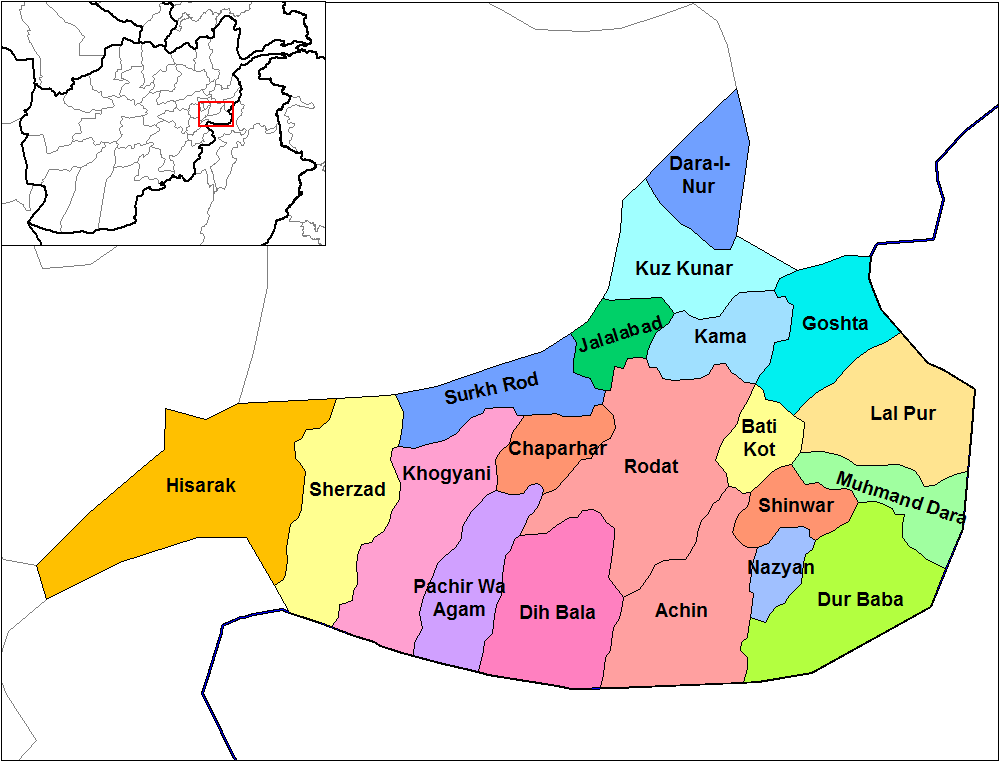
- Achin District is located in the south of Nangarhar Province.
- Country: Afghanistan
- Province: Nangarhar Province
- Capital: Sra Kala
- Governor: Haji Ghaleb Mujahed

Population (2006)
  - Total: 95,468
- Time zone: UTC+4:30 (D† (Afghanistan Standard Time))

Achin (Pashto: اچين ولسوالۍ) is a district in southern Nangarhar Province, Afghanistan, on the border with Pakistan.

Its population is 100% Pashtun. Achin is home to the Shinwari tribe, one of the largest Pashtun tribes.

It was a stronghold of the Mujaheddin during the Soviet occupation of Afghanistan in the 1980s.

During the April 2017 Nangarhar airstrike, the United States Air Force dropped a MOAB in Achin district which targeted a tunnel complex of the ISIS-affiliate located in the area, and reportedly killed dozens of militants.

== Economy ==
The primary licit crop in Achin is wheat. Collecting and selling firewood, and manual labor, are other income-generating activities. Tobacco is also grown in the district.

=== Opium poppy ===
In 2000, UNDCP recorded 130 poppy-growing villages in Achin, making it the greatest opium growing district in eastern Afghanistan that year.
