= Mawlawi Aslam Farooqi =

Islamic militant and former ISIS–K head

- مولوي اسلم فاروقي
- Unconfirmed photo of Farooqi

6th Wali of ISIS – Khorasan Province
- In office April 2019 – 4 April 2020
- Preceded by: Abu Omar al-Khorasani
- Succeeded by: Shahab al-Muhajir

Personal details
- Born: 1971 Kalaya, Orakzai Agency, Pakistan
- Died: 16 January 2022 (aged 51) Afghanistan

Military service
- Allegiance: Sipah-e-Sahaba (1999–2007); Tehrik-i-Taliban Pakistan; Lashkar-e-Taiba; ISIS–Khorasan Province

Mawlawi Aslam Farooqi (born 1971 – 16 January 2022), also referred to as Mullah Aslam Farooqi and Akhundzada Aslam Farooqi, and whose true name is Abdullah Orakzai, was an Islamist-jihadist militant from Pakistan who was a Sipah-e-Sahaba and Pakistani Taliban commander, and the fourth head (wali) of the Islamic State – Khorasan Province (ISIS–K).

== Early life ==
Mawlawi Aslam Farooqi, born Abdullah Orakzai, was born around 1965 to a tribal Pashtun family in the town of Kalaya, Lower Orakzai Tehsil, Orakzai Agency (now Orakzai District), in the Federally Administered Tribal Areas (FATA, later merged into Khyber Pakhtunkhwa Province, KPK) in Pakistan. Farooqi was a Pakistani Pashtun, spoke Pashto, and belonged to the Mamozai tribe, a sub-tribe of the Orakzai.

Farooqi reportedly had four children.

== Islamic militancy ==
In 1999, when Farooqi was in his early 30s, he established a lashkar (traditional Pashtun militia) in Orakzai Agency, assembling 300 to 400 fighters known informally as the 'Aslam Farooqi group', and partially-merging with Sipah-e-Sahaba (SS or SSP), both groups fighting within Orakzai Agency Shia Muslims which they view as heretics. Farooqi's home town of Kalaya is known foremost for its bloody sectarian conflict between Sunni and Shia Muslims and the heavy presence of violent militant groups.

Following the September 11th attacks in the United States, Farooqi met with senior Afghan Taliban leaders to include Mohammad Abdul Kabir in 2001 to plan a joint campaign against NATO forces entering Afghanistan. Farooqi reportedly offered the Afghan Taliban, who were unseated from power in Kabul, 12,000 armed and supplied men to join in the resistance against coalition forces. Many of Farooqi's dispatched men disappeared into Afghanistan in the face of rapid losses incurred by the Afghan Taliban.

Militant violence in Orakzai was generally rare in Orakzai up until the 2004 to 2006 time period when operations by the Pakistani military in South Waziristan forced civilians and foreign militants alike to flee into Orakzai Agency seeking safety. In 2007, the militant group called Tehrik-e Taliban Pakistan (TTP) was established by Baitullah Mehsud with some sources naming Farooqi a co-founder. In August 2009, TTP founder and emir Baitullah Mehsud was killed in an airstrike and succeeded as emir by Hakimullah Mehsud soon thereafter. Becoming the overall TTP emir, Hakimullah vacated his role as TTP head for Orakzai Agency, a vacancy that Farooqi filled that same year. Orakzai Agency and later Orakzai District, has been a critical "second home" for the TTP, especially as renewed Pakistani military offensives in South Waziristan in 2009 forced TTP fighters to flee into Orakzai Agency.

On 18 December 2014, Farooqi was named by Pakistani police as a suspect alongside fourteen other TTP leaders two days after the 2014 Peshawar school massacre, widely considered one of the world's most deadly and heinous terror attacks.

=== Islamic State ===
By August 2018, following the deaths of the first four walis of ISIS–K, two factions began to emerge within ISIS–K, the first led by Farooqi in the southeastern provinces of Khost, Nangarhar, Kunar, Paktia, Paktika, and Logar; and the latter led by Uzbek militant Mauvia Uzbeki in Afghanistan's northern provinces, the latter of the two was more aligned with the Islamic Movement of Uzbekistan (IMU) and at greater odds with the Afghan Taliban.

According to the United Nations Analytic Support and Sanctions Monitoring Team's July 2019 report on ISIS–K, during an April 2019 visit by an ISIS–Core delegation, Abu Omar al-Khorasani (also known as Mawlawi Zia ul-Haq) was demoted and dismissed as head (wali) of ISIS–K and replaced by Mawlawi Aslam Farooqi. The report attributed al-Khorasani's dismissal by the ISIS–Core delegation to "poor performance in the context of ISIL–K setbacks in Nangarhar in the second half of 2018." Abu Omar al-Khorasani had served as ISIS–K wali since August 2018 when his predecessor, Abu Saad Erhabi, was killed in a joint US and Afghan military raid. Al-Khorasani's four-month tenure would be the second shortest tenure after Abdul Rahman Ghaleb and the only instance of an ISIS–K wali abdicating the position for reasons other than detention or death.

Farooqi oversaw a number of high-profile attacks by ISIS–K including a complex attack on the Afghan Ministry of Information, the bloody August 2019 bombing of hundreds of civilians celebrating a wedding in Kabul, the group's only attack outside Afghanistan and Pakistan against a Tajik border guard post, the suicide bombing of a mosque in Quetta, an attack on a ceremony to commemorate the anniversary of the murder of an Afghan Shia leader, and a complex attack at a packed Sikh shrine in Kabul; killing 191 and wounding more than 273 in these attacks alone.

== Arrest ==
On 4 April 2020, the Afghan special forces and National Directorate of Security (NDS) announced that it had arrested Farooqi and 19 other ISIS–K militants in Kandahar Province. Posting to Twitter a photo of Farooqi detained, the Afghan government's Office of the National Security Council spokesperson, Javid Faisal specified "in initial investigations, [Farooqi] has confessed of strong relationship between the Islamic State–Khurasan and regional intelligence agencies." The reference to "regional intelligence agencies" was understood to be a subtle reference to the Pakistani Inter-Services Intelligence (ISI) which has a controversial history of support for Islamic militant groups. Less subtly, an advisor to the Afghan National Security Council, Kabir Haqmal, reportedly told the Turkish news outlet Anadolu Agency that Farooqi was working under direct command of Pakistani ISI and, following a later clash between the Afghan and Pakistani governments over a possible extradition, Haqmal surmised "Pakistan fears he will reveal all their secrets about ties to militant groups."

Two days after Farooqi's arrest, on 6 April 2020, the international humanitarian group Human Rights Watch (HRW) issued a public statement calling on the Afghan government to "bring appropriate war crimes charges against Aslam Farooqi... for his alleged role in directing attacks against civilians in Afghanistan" citing Article 337 of the 2017 Afghan penal code which proscribes intentional attacks against civilians including those against religious and educational buildings. Patricia Gossman, Human Rights Watch's associate Asia director remarked "Farooqi's arrest is an opportunity for the Afghan authorities to show that they are capable of securing fair justice for victims of war crimes and other atrocities... Victim participation is key to ensure that justice is not only done, but seen to be done, by those most affected by Farooqi's crimes." Gossman added "Afghanistan owes it to the victims to carry out a credible prosecution and fair trial of Aslam Farooqi and others accused of serious crimes... The pursuit of justice is essential if Afghanistan is to bring an end to such violence."

=== Request for extradition ===
Five days after Farooqi's arrest, late on 9 April 2020, The Pakistani Ministry of Foreign Affairs summoned Afghan Ambassador to Pakistan Atif Mahal to communicate Pakistan's concerns regarding ISIS–K and the group's presence on the Afghan–Pakistan border as well as to request Farooqi's extradition. An accompanying press release from the ministry explained "It was underscored to the Ambassador that since Aslam Farooqi was involved in anti-Pakistan activities in Afghanistan, he should be handed-over to Pakistan for further investigations. It was further underlined that the two sides should coordinate actions against the menace of terrorism, including through established mechanisms." Farooqi was both a Pakistani (born in Orakzai Agency), had fought against the Pakistani military as a member of Sipah-e Sahaba and the Pakistani Taliban, and had also overseen the January 2020 suicide bombing of a mosque in Quetta, capital of Balochistan Province, Pakistan by ISIS–K that killed 15 and injured at least 19 others. The day after the extradition request was made, on 10 April, the Afghan government declined to extradite Farooqi, stating instead "Aslam Farooqi will be dealt with based on the Afghanistan's [sic] law." Former head of the Afghan NDS, Rehmatullah Nabil, responded by citing numerous cases in which Pakistan had itself refused to extradite captured militants to Afghanistan including Mullah Baradar, Sadar Ibrahim, Mullah Daoud, Mawlawi Mirahmad Gul, Mullah Abdul Salam, and allegedly continued to host Haibatullah Akhundzada, Sirajuddin Haqqani (head of Haqqani network), Mullah Yaqoob, Aziz Haqqani, and Yahya Haqqani.

== Death ==
Though many ISIS–K members were executed as Taliban let free hundreds of prisoners jailed under the former government during their capture of Kabul in 2021, including Farooqi's predecessor, Abu Omar al-Khorasani, Farooqi was let free alongside other ISIS–K and Taliban fighters in August 2021. Just over four months later, on 16 January 2022, Mawlawi Aslam Farooqi was shot and killed in an apparent shootout with Taliban militants in northern Afghanistan. No authoritative account has yet to emerge, however local Afghan news outlets have suggested the clash was the result of either a confrontation during a Taliban investigation into organized kidnappings and criminal mafia activity, or that Farooqi was killed during an internal clash within ISIS–K. Farooqi's body was returned to his family in his birthplace, Orakzai District in Khyber-Pakhtunkhwa Province, Pakistan.

== See also ==
- Islamic State – Khorasan Province
- List of terrorist incidents linked to ISIS–K
- History of ISIS–K
