= Hafiz Saeed Khan =

Pakistani Taliban and ISIS–K member (1972–2016)

Hafiz Saeed Khan Orakzai
- حفیظ سعید خان اورکزئ

1st Wali of ISIS – Khorasan Province
- In office 11 January 2015 – 26 July 2016
- Preceded by: Position established
- Succeeded by: Abdul Haseeb Logari

Emir of Orakzai Agency Tehrik-e Taliban Pakistan
- In office December 2007 – 3 November 2013

Personal details
- Born: c. 1972 Mamozai, Orakzai, Pakistan
- Died: July 26, 2016 (aged 43–44) Achin, Nangarhar, Afghanistan

Military service
- Allegiance: Afghan Taliban (2001–2007); Tehrik-i-Taliban Pakistan (2007–2014); ISIS– Khorasan Province (2014–2016)

Hafiz Saeed Khan (1972 – 26 July 2016), also known as Mullah Saeed Orakzai, Shaykh Hafidh Sa'id Khan, or Mawlawi Saeed Khan, was an Islamic militant and emir for the militant group Islamic State – Khorasan Province (ISIS–K) from January 2015 until his death in July 2016. Prior to 2015, Khan fought alongside the Afghan Taliban against NATO forces in Afghanistan, joined the militant group Tehrik-e Taliban Pakistan (TTP) as a senior commander, and later swore allegiance to ISIS caliph Abu Bakr al-Baghdadi, established ISIS–K in Afghanistan as the province's first emir until his death in a reported American drone strike.

== Early life ==
Saeed was born in 1972, into the Mamozai area of the Upper-Orakzai Tehsil (subdistrict) of Orakzai Agency (today Orakzai District) in the Federally Administered Tribal Areas (FATA, today part of Khyber-Pakhtunkhwa Province, KPK) in western Pakistan. The Mamozai sub-tribe, the area's eponym, belongs to the Orakzai tribe of the Pashtun people. Pashtuns are the predominant ethnic group in southern and eastern Afghanistan and Pakistan's contemporary Khyber-Pakhtunkhwa Province, split by the Durand Line, a division many Pashtuns do not recognize. Both the Afghan Taliban and Pakistani Taliban (TTP) movements are Pashtun-dominated and often Pashtun-nationalist.

Saeed received his early education from Maulana Shabit, a local cleric in Orakzai Agency, before he moved south to Hangu District, Kohat Division, North-West Frontier Province (NWFP, now KPK) and attended Dar al-Uloom Islamia Hangu (Urdu: دار العلوم اسلامیه ہنگو) where one of his classmates, Maulana Shahidullah, remembered that Saeed had memorized the entire Quran in one year, was particularly peaceful, and would later marry his cousin, producing two sons and one daughter before taking another wife from North Waziristan Agency in the FATA (now a district in KPK). In Islam, one who memorizes the entire Quran (77,430 words in 114 chapters), is rewarded with the title 'Hafiz' (Arabic: حافظ), which translates from Arabic as 'protector'.

Though Afghan and Pakistani Taliban often belong to the Deobandi movement, Saeed Khan belonged to the Panjpiri movement, perhaps receiving education from one of the many Saudi-financed Salafist madrassas whose ideology originates in the town of Panjpir in Swabi District, KPK.

== Islamic militancy ==
=== Afghan and Pakistani Taliban ===
In late 2001, when Hafiz Saeed Khan was around 30 years of age, the United States invaded Afghanistan in response to the refusal by Taliban emir Mullah Omar to expel Osama bin Laden following the September 11th 2001 terrorist attacks in the United States. Saeed traveled to the Afghan capital, Kabul, to join the Afghan Taliban in their fight against US and NATO forces, remaining there for at least two years. Saeed grew close to Baitullah Mehsud who would found and initially lead the Pakistani Taliban (Tehrik-e Taliban Pakistan, TTP) in December 2007 and nominate Saeed to sit on the group's Majlis as-Shura (Pashto: مجلس الشوری, 'Shura Council'), a consultative council for deliberating the group's major decisions. Baitullah, a Pashto of the Mehsud tribe from Bannu District, NWFP and close in age to Saeed, would also appoint Saeed as emir for his birth agency: Orakzai Agency.

Almost two years since the founding of TTP, when Saeed was around 37 years old, Baitullah Mehsud was killed in an American drone strike in August 2009. His death triggered a succession crisis for the group with senior commanders Hakimullah Mehsud (no biological relation to Baitullah) and Wali ur-Rahman (both of the Mehsud tribe and from South Waziristan) supported by different commanders to succeed Baitullah as TTP emir. A shura, in accordance with Islamic tradition, was convened to deliberate Baitullah's successor but the exchange became heated and ended with open gunfire during which Wali ur-Rahman allegedly shot Hakimullah, sparking rumors that Hakimullah had been killed prompting ur-Rahman to call Reuters and deny that any gunfire had been exchanged and that Hakimullah was alive and well. Hakimullah would officially ascend to become the group's second emir, though the issue formed a severe split among TTP factions and frustrated Saeed. Saeed's tribe, the Mamozai tribe in Orakzai Agency, was reportedly the only tribe that provided refuge to the TTP militants after Baitullah's death. Saeed seemingly maintained a positive relationship with Hakimullah Mehsud despite supporting Wali ur-Rahman and rose in the ranks as an aide to Hakimullah beginning in 2008 when Hakimullah moved to Orakzai Agency. Hakimullah appointed Saeed as emir of the Upper Orakzai Tehsil (subdivision) with TTP commanders Zia ur-Rahman and Mullah Toufan heading the Lower and Central Orakzai Tehsils.

On 14 July 2012, as initial attempts by the United Nations to negotiate a ceasefire in the year-old Syrian civil war broke down and a full-fledged violent war began to emerge, Hafiz Saeed Khan agreed to rapidly assemble a group of 143 Afghan and Pakistani volunteer fighters for al-Qaeda (a TTP sponsor) to dispatch to Syria and join al-Qaeda's al-Nusra Front in the fight against Bashar al-Assad's brutal government. Unlike previous Afghan and Pakistani fighters sent to fight in Iraq post-2003 and early in the Syrian civil war, these fighters were the first group to serve as a cohesive unit instead of being rapidly dissolved into the al-Nusra Front ranks. Likely appreciative of the volunteer fighters supplied by groups in Afghanistan and Pakistan, the ISIS Military Commission in Syria offered ten TTP and Taliban volunteer group leaders from Saeed Khan's first dispatch $1 million to proselytize for the movement when they returned to Afghanistan and Pakistan with their jihadist combat experience, laying the groundwork for the later formation of ISIS–K.

Saeed's success as a TTP leader took a steep dive in late 2013 when an American drone strike in the Dande Darpakhel village of North Waziristan Agency killed Hakimullah Mehsud in a farmhouse, once again leaving the position of TTP emir open. Hafiz Saeed Khan was reportedly among the contenders to serve as the third emir of TTP but Mullah Fazlullah officially took the role on 7 November 2013. The TTP fragmented into a number of warring factions under Fazlullah who was unpopular with members of the group, especially as a non-Mehsud from Swat District. The combined stresses of being passed over as TTP emir, attempting to lead in a fracturing organization under the unpopular Fazlullah, and the mid-June 2014 Pakistani military operation against TTP in the FATA (Operation Zarb-e-Azb), prompted Hafiz Saeed Khan, TTP spokesman Shahidullah Shahid, and other key commanders to abandon TTP, and cross the border into Nangarhar Province, Afghanistan along with hundreds of other families fleeing the violence between the TTP and Operation Zarb-e-Azb.

=== Islamic State ===
Having already pledged Bay'ah (allegiance) to the emir of the Islamic State of Iraq and Syria, Abu Bakr al-Baghdadi on 11 May 2013, and now 42 years old, Saeed formally established Tehrik-e Khilafat Pakistan (Pashto: تحریک خلافت پاکستان, 'Caliphate Movement of Pakistan', TKP) under his leadership which would comprise nearly the entire Pakistani component of ISIS–K when TKP would merge with three Afghan groups in January 2015. Saeed's TKP was the product of the merger of eight groups defected from the TTP, each comprising a few hundred men and led by a commander:

1. Hafiz Saeed Khan, Orakzai Agency
2. Khalid Mansoor, Hangu District
3. Mufti Hassan Swati, Peshawar
4. Gul Zaman Fateh, Khyber Agency
5. Hafiz Dawlat Khan, Kurram Agency
6. Abdul Bahar Mehsud, Waziristan
7. Abu Bakr, Bajaur Agency
8. Shahidullah Shahid, spokesman of the TTP.

On 14 August 2014, Saeed would announce the establishment of TKP, and later on 15 October 2014, Saeed publicly announced in a video his departure from TTP and condemned the group. On 11 January 2015, Saeed and spokesman Shahidullah Shahid released a video message announcing the establishment of ISIS–K, an affiliate of the Islamic State in Khorasan Province. ISIS–K's establishment would be officially confirmed by ISIS-Central on 26 January 2015 when ISIS's chief spokesperson, Abu Muhammad al-Adnan released an audio statement announcing the establishment of Wilayat Khorasan under its emir, Hafiz Saeed Khan.

The 13th issue of the Islamic State's Dabiq, published 19 January 2016, features an eight-page interview with Saeed. Responding to questions posed by Dabiq, Saeed cheerfully described the group's progress, establishment of public services, praise for the religiosity of Afghans, failures of the "nationalist Taliban movement" and its connections with Pakistani intelligence, supposed flow of jihadist recruits to join ISIS–K in Afghanistan, pledge of bay'ah by Uzbek militants to ISIS–K, Taliban corruption and permittance of narcotics, Taliban cover-up of Mullah Omar's death, the supposed collapse of al-Qaeda in the region, operations against Shia Muslims, and future ambitions to continue the jihad to Kashmir.

==== US sanctions ====
On 29 September 2015, the United States Department of the Treasury sanctioned Saeed alongside 15 other Islamic State leaders. According to the Department of the Treasury, "Khan, as leader of ISIL-K, plays a central role in expanding ISIL’s operations in the region, commanding militants and coordinating the delivery of supplies and munitions, the travel of associates, and other arrangements. In mid-2015, Khan appointed ISIL representatives in Kunar Province and Nangarhar Province, Afghanistan and approved funding for the establishment of a training camp for ISIL fighters in western Afghanistan. ISIL militants under Khan’s command had taken control of several districts in Nangarhar Province in mid-2015".

== Death ==
On 12 July 2015, the Afghan intelligence agency, the National Directorate of Security, claimed that Saeed was killed in a strike carried out by US-led coalition forces in coordination with intelligence provided by the spy agency, though the United States never confirmed such an operation. The Islamic State rejected the claim, but the strike did kill Shahidullah Shahid and Gul Zaman, according to senior ISIS–K leader Abdul Rahim Muslim Dost.

On 12 August 2016, the United States announced that Hafiz Saeed Khan was killed on 26 July 2016 in a U.S. airstrike in Achin district of Afghanistan's Nangarhar Province. There was no immediate response from the group itself, and it was initially unknown who would succeed him. He was succeeded by Abdul Hasib, who was in turn killed by Afghan and US Special Forces in Nangarhar on 27 April 2017.
