= 2007 South Waziristan conflict =

2007 South Waziristan clashes
- Part of the insurgency in Khyber Pakhtunkhwa
Date	March–April 2007
Location	Wana, South Waziristan, Khyber Pakhtunkhwa, Pakistan
Result	Anti-Uzbek victory: Around 250 Uzbeks killed and over 2,000 expelled; Pro-Uzbek groups militarily defeated; End of IMU activities in Waziristan

Belligerents
Pakistani Taliban; Anti-Uzbek factions; Local Pashtun tribes; Ahmadzai Wazir clan; Supported by: Afghan Taliban	Pakistani Taliban; Pro-Uzbek factions; Islamic Movement of Uzbekistan; Islamist Uzbeks in Waziristan

Commanders and leaders
Mullah Nazir	Baitullah Mehsud; Tahir Yuldashev; Haji Sharif; Haji Omar; Noor Islam

The 2007 South Waziristan clashes were a conflict between Anti-Uzbek factions of the Pakistani Taliban, and the Islamic Movement of Uzbekistan, alongside Pro-Uzbek factions of the Pakistani Taliban, in Wana, Khyber Pakhtunkhwa.

== History ==
After the War in Afghanistan, the Islamic Movement of Uzbekistan, predominantly composed of Uzbeks, became entrenched in Waziristan, namely South Waziristan. The Uzbeks invoked the hospitality law of the Pashtunwali and were hosted by the TTP, mainly the Baitullah Mehsud branch. Many Uzbeks later married Pashtun women, acquired property, and engaged in economic activity. Tensions later rose between Uzbeks and the local Pashtuns, who complained about the Uzbeks becoming increasingly dominant and trying to enforce their Sharia. Mullah Nazir specifically targeted the Uzbeks out of the other foreign fighters who operated in the FATA region.

The Uzbeks in the Wana region were hosted by Maulvi Omar, an Ahmadzai Wazir and ally of Baitullah Mehsud. In early 2007, Mullah Nazir, another Ahmadzai Wazir, overthrew Maulvi Omar as the leader of the Taliban in the Wanna region. The Uzbeks fought against Mullah Nazir, and lost between fifty and one hundred fighters. Mullah Nazir was supported by the Afghan Taliban, who used South Waziristan as a rear base for their fight in Afghanistan. The Afghan Taliban did not want problems with Pakistan, at least not until the fight in Afghanistan was over. They also opposed the activities of Baitullah Mehsud. The locals of Waziristan were also increasingly angered with Baitullah Mehsud. While Baitullah Mehsud attacked Pakistan, Mullah Nazir preferred to focus on fighting American troops in Afghanistan.

In 2006, Mullah Omar endorsed Mullah Nazir as the emir of South Waziristan. Mullah Nazir had always opposed the presence of the IMU in Waziristan and had quarrelled with two other TTP leaders, brothers Haji Sharif and Haji Omar, over the Uzbeks. In March 2007, Mullah Nazir ordered the expulsion of Uzbeks from all territory belonging to the greater Wazir tribe. Mullah Nazir was joined by the Ahmadzai Wazir tribe, and his Taliban faction. By April 2007, around 250 Uzbek jihadists were killed, and all of the Uzbeks in Wana, numbering over 2,000, had fled. Baitullah Mehsud offered the fleeing Uzbeks shelter in Mehsud regions in South Waziristan. This had further angered Mullah Nazir, who wanted to expel Uzbek jihadists from the entire Pashtun region.

The TTP groups of two brothers, Haji Sharif and Haji Omar, had fought on behalf of the Uzbeks against Mullah Nazir. Haji Omar supported the Uzbeks and was involved in the killing of tribal elders in Wana. After the Uzbeks were expelled, Haji Sharif and Haji Omar were quickly defeated by Mullah Nazir, and were exiled to Miranshah. In September 2007, Haji Sharif began having disputes with the Uzbeks over the targeting of locals in Wana, and reconciled with Mullah Nazir, and came back to Wana where he stopped targeting tribal elders. Haji Omar was killed in December 2009 by an American airstrike. Noor Islam, the third brother, and the "sworn enemy" of Mullah Nazir, took refuge with Beitullah Mahsud after the clashes. Abbas Wazir, a cousin of Haji Omar and Haji Sharif, had fought alongside Mullah Nazir against the Uzbeks.

Pashtuns increasingly supported the campaign of Mullah Nazir. The Pakistani government avoided the fighting, and a government official claimed that there already was "a groundswell of support for action against Uzbeks and any attempt by the government to intervene in support of the tribal action would actually discredit it." The fighting stopped in April 2007, and Mullah Nazir was successful in his campaign against the Uzbeks. The Pakistani army was deployed to restore law and order once the fighting stopped. The Afghan Taliban was involved in mediating between Mullah Nazir and the Pakistani government.

While the Uzbeks were expelled after April 2007, tensions continued between the TTP factions until a 2011 peace deal between Mullah Nazir and Hakimullah Mehsud.

== See also ==
- 2007 Kurram Agency conflict
- First Battle of Swat
- 2014 Jinnah International Airport attack
