= Terrorist incidents in Pakistan in 2012 =

This is a list of terrorist incidents in Pakistan in 2012. Pakistan has faced numerous attacks by insurgents as a result of the ongoing War in North-West Pakistan by the Pakistani military against militant groups, part of the War on Terror. At the same time, there have also been numerous drone attacks in Pakistan carried out by the United States which exclusively target members of militant groups along the Afghan border regions.

== January – March ==
- January 1 Askari Raza, leader of a Shi'a political organisation Pasban-e-Jaferia, was shot dead in a sectarian-motivated target killing in Karachi by two armed men riding a motorcycle a day earlier. He was accompanied by a friend in his car, who was injured in the attack. The attackers were also said to be injured when two other men accompanying Raza fired in retaliation although they managed to escape safely. At least 15,000 Shi'a protestors staged a sit-in outside the Sindh Governor House on the first day of January to protest the assassination.
- January 3 – Three blasts took place in three different cities: Gujrat, Peshawar and Landi Kotal (Khyber Agency), killing in total at least five people and injuring dozens others.
- January 4 A remote-controlled blast in Sui, Balochistan killed an Amn force guard and injured two other tribesmen.
- January 5 The Pakistani Taliban (TTP) murdered 15 Frontier Constabulary soldiers in Orakzai Agency who had been kidnapped and kept in custody for over a year. The bodies were recovered in North Waziristan, sustaining 40 bullets each and also bearing signs of torture. Terming the killings a "new year gift", the TTP called the incident a retaliation for the killing of Taliban comrades earlier by Pakistani security forces, saying that their military operations were against Islam and Pashtun tribal traditions, and vowed further violence. The funeral prayers for the soldiers were offered at an FC headquarters in Peshawar and the bodies buried with honours. The killings were condemned by numerous political figures, including Imran Khan.
- January 7 Four people were killed in various sectarian target killing incidents in Gilgit. The government of Gilgit-Baltistan issues shoot-to-kill orders for target killers.
- January 9 Ten soldiers who had earlier gone missing in December 2011 after a raid by militants were found dead in the Upper Orakzai area. A lesser known militant group working under the TTP umbrella claimed responsibility for the executions. The bodies were flown to Peshawar, where their funeral prayers were offered. The incident came just days after 15 FC soldiers were killed, also in Orakzai Agency.
- January 10 A bomb exploded near a petrol pump in the town of Jamrud near the Afghan border in Khyber Agency, FATA. The bombing killed at least 30 people while over 70 others were critically injured.
- January 12 Baloch Liberation Front insurgents ambushed a convoy of paramilitary troops near Turbat, killing fourteen soldiers.
- January 12 – Over a hundred militants launched an attack on a police checkpost in Sarband, an area on the outskirts of Peshawar. Two policemen were killed and eleven others injured.
- January 13 Police say about 100 militants have ambushed a police station in the northwestern city of Peshawar, shooting dead three officers.
- January 14 – Four suicide bombers sent by the Tehrik-i-Taliban attacked a district police office in Dera Ismail Khan. The suicide bombers had attempted to take over the building and conduct a hostage-type attack although were unsuccessful when security forces managed to contain them in a firefight. Three bombers detonated their explosives, dying instantly, while another was shot dead by troops. Two of the dead bombers were identified as foreigners. Some of the bombers were disguised in police uniforms. Apart from the militants, three civilians and one police official also died in the attack while eight others were injured.
- January 15 – A remote-controlled bomb went off during a Shi'a Muslim Chehlum procession in the tehsil of Khanpur in Rahim Yar Khan District, Punjab. Eighteen people were killed and dozens of others injured from the incident.
- January 18 – A regional sales officer at a Warid Telecom franchise outlet in Karachi, Ahsan Kamal, died when two armed men entered the store and attempted to loot it. When Kamal attempted to resist the men, he was shot dead.
- January 24 – A party activist of the Ahle Sunnat wal Jammat was gunned down in Karachi.
- January 25 – Three lawyers belonging to the Shi'a sect were killed during a firing incident initiated by unknown gunmen near a city court in Karachi.
- January 30 – A commander of a banned militant outfit (Ansar-ul-Islam), Haji Akhunzada, and three others were killed following a suicide attack outside the commander's home in the outskirts of Peshawar. According to Akhunzada's son, a rival militant group Lashkar-e-Islam (LeI) led by Mangal Bagh Afridi had long been targeting Akhunzada, and had also murdered some his close relatives before, because he "was helping the government against extremist group Lashkar-e-Islam (LeI)."
- January 31 – One security guard and a woman were killed when unknown terrorists opened fire inside a Telenor franchise in Nazimabad, Karachi.
- February 1 – at least 15 Fc soldiers were killed and 15 to 20 injured and 3 captured during an attack on their check posts in Margat Bolan Balochistan by Baloch Liberation Army
- February 17 A suicide bombing in a bazaar in Parachinar, targeting Shi'a Muslims, killed 41 people. A splinter group of the Tehreek-i-Taliban Pakistan claimed responsibility for the attack, alleging the local Shi'a community of being involved in activities against them.
- February 23 – A remote control car blast in Peshawar killed at least 12 people and injured 32 people.
- February 24 – Three suicide bombers attacked a police checkpost in Peshawar, killing four policemen and injuring six. The attack was a reaction to the killing of a top Taliban commander in Waziristan. When the bombers were engaged by the policemen in firing, they blew themselves up.
- February 27 – A blast after an Awami National Party rally in Nowshera killed seven and injured over twenty others. It was a remote control bomb, parked along with the road side, confirmed by Bomb Disposal Squad.
- February 28 – Militants ambushed a bus carrying Shi'a Muslims in Kohistan, killing all 18 people on board.
- March 11 – A suicide bomber attacked a funeral attended by an anti-Taliban politician in northwest Pakistan on Sunday, killing at least 15 mourners.
- March 15 – A suicide attack on Thursday killed a senior Pakistani police officer and wounded his bodyguard in the northwestern city of Peshawar.
- March 20 – A bomb planted in a rickshaw killed two policemen and wounded four other people in the northwestern Pakistani city of Peshawar on Tuesday, police and hospital officials said.
- March 23 Peshawar - A suicide bomber blew himself up outside a mosque on Friday, killing 5-13 people in Pakistan's lawless tribal belt, a Taliban and Al-Qaeda stronghold on the Afghan border, officials said.
- March 24 – At least seven soldiers and 22 militants died in clashes between Pakistani troops and militants in the restive northwestern tribal belt
- March 24 – Gunmen ambushed a Pakistani paramilitary checkpost on Friday, killing four soldiers and abducting four others in the southwestern province of Balochistan
- March 25 PESHAWAR, Pakistan - At least three soldiers were killed after dozens of Taliban militants stormed a check post in Pakistan's northwest tribal region near the Afghan border, officials said Saturday.

== April - June ==
- April 4 Khyber Agency - A bomb blasts in a passenger van in Jamrud, at least six people killed and three injured.
- April 24 A five kilogram bomb was implanted at platform no. 2, Railway Station, Lahore. The blast killed at least three people and injured over thirty others. A banned group called the "Lashkar-e-Balochistan" claimed responsibility for the attack, calling it a retaliation for the ongoing kill and dump operations in Balochistan. A spokesman for the group said that the group did not want to target common citizens but the state machinery had "forced them to commit such acts". He also warned that Islamabad and Rawalpindi were next targets if the killings of Baloch civilians did not stop.
- May 3 Two bomb attacks killed at least five people in Pakistan's tribal areas
- June 7 At least 15 people, including 5 children, were killed and over 48 injured when a remote-controlled bomb blast triggered outside a madrassa in Quetta.
- June 8 A bus carrying government employees near Peshawar exploded when a bomb which had been planted inside it beforehand went off. Nineteen people were killed in the attack.
- June 16 A bomb blast in a market in Landi Kotal, Khyber Agency killed 23 people and injured over 50 others.
- June 17 a car bomb, hit a crowded bazaar in the town of Landi Kotal in the Khyber region killing 26 people and wounded over 50 others
- June 17 a bomb hidden in a handcart killed seven people in the district of Kohat
- June 18 Bus carrying Shias is bombed in Pakistan's Quetta city
- June 21 A bomb on a donkey cart killed three people at a Sufi shrine in Peshawar
- June 21 A bomb exploded in a mosque in the southwestern city of Quetta, killing two worshippers and wounding 13 others
- June 23 A gunman on motorcycles shot dead eight men at a laundry in a busy area of Quetta
- June 24 Two gunmen riding a motorbike opened fire on a police mobile van, killing three policemen
- June 24 Terrorists from Afghanistan crossed over the border and killed six soldiers in gunbattles, while eleven others went missing. A day later, news emerged that seven of those soldiers had been killed and beheaded by the militants who infiltrated from Afghanistan.
- June 25 Seven captured Pakistani soldiers 'beheaded by Taliban
- June 27 A bomb has exploded at a railway station in western Pakistan, killing at least five people
- June 28 A remote controlled bomb killed four Frontier Corps paramilitary personnel in the town of Bara in Khyber Agency, FATA.
- June 28 14 people were killed and 30 others injured when a suicide attack occurred on a bus in Quetta which was returning from Iran carrying pilgrims belonging to the Hazara community.

== July - September ==
- July 6 18 Shi'a pilgrims who were travelling to Iran were killed when unidentified assailants opened fire on their vehicle in the town of Turbat, Balochistan.
- July 8 14 people were killed by a landmine blast in Chaman, Balochistan near the Afghan border.
- July 9 Gunmen attacked a military camp near Wazirabad in Punjab, killing seven security personnel. The attack came at a time when Pakistan reopened NATO supply lines to Afghanistan, which had previously been closed for eight months to protest the 2011 NATO attack in Pakistan.
- July 11 One person was killed and nineteen others injured when a blast targeted a bus carrying employees of the Space and Upper Atmosphere Research Commission (SUPARCO) on the Hub River Road in Karachi. The bomb was planted on a bicycle and was remote-controlled. According to news, the person killed was a passer-by. There were up to 40 people on board the bus. Most injuries occurred due to the shattering of the glass windows of the bus.
- July 12 Tehrik-i-Taliban gunmen wearing masks attacked a police academy in early morning hours in Lahore, killing nine police cadets. This was the second militant attack against a security force installation in the relatively peaceful province of Punjab. The victims were mainly from Khyber Pakhtunkhwa near the Afghan border. According to TTP spokesman Ehsanullah, police officers from Khyber Pakhtunkhwa had been specifically targeted in Lahore because of the Khyber Pakhtunkhwa Police's record of "treating Taliban detainees poorly." The TTP threatened more similar attacks.
- July 12 The miners were abducted on July 7 in the Soorang area, 25 kilometres east of the provincial capital Quetta, and their bullet-ridden bodies were found dumped on a roadside in the hills of nearby Degari, The Baluchistan Liberation Army, which is fighting for independence from the federal government, had claimed responsibility for their kidnapping
- July 13 Five persons were killed and ten injured in a bomb explosion at busy Kuchlak Bazar in Quetta suburban area.
- July 15 A mortar bomb fell on a house in Peshawar's Shaikhan village area on Sunday, killing four
- July 15 18 people were killed in incidents of target killings in Karachi.
- July 18 A bomb targeted a vehicle in Orakzai Agency, FATA. Fourteen people of the same clan were killed in the incident. The bombing was said to be motivated by sectarianism.
- July 18 At least eight people were killed when a passenger van hit a landmine on the border between Pakistan's Orakzai tribal region and Kohat district
- July 21 A suicide bomb attack has killed at least nine people in north-western Pakistan
- July 21 A bomb explosion at a compound in Orakzai killed nine people and wounded 20.
- July 21 Militants suspected to be allied with the banned Balochistan Liberation Army attacked a coast guard post in the port city of Gwadar in Balochistan, killing six security personnel.
- July 21 Roadside bomb kills three in Upper Dir
- July 21 At least eight security men were killed and two were injured in an attack on the coast guard's checkpost
- July 25
- July 26 Nine people were killed and 23 others injured after a bomb exploded in a market in the Salarzai area of Bajaur Agency.
- August 1. Two bomb explosions in the fruit market area of Lahore injured 20 people, 5 of them seriously.
- August 6 Five militants, including a key commander, were killed in a roadside bomb blast in the northwestern tribal region of Khyber
- August 6 A woman and two children were killed in a blast around house in Quetta. The blast had been triggered by a bomb placed in a car.
- August 6 Militants in Pakistan attack Nato truck in north-west Pakistan
- August 7 A bomb killed four policemen and wounded 14 others in Pakistan's troubled southwestern province of Balochistan
- August 12A remote-controlled bomb attack on Sunday killed three soldiers in Pakistan's troubled Waziristan district
- August 15 At least one security personnel was killed and three others injured when a landmine exploded in Pakistan's northwestern Kurram
- August 16 Tehrik-i-Taliban militants staged an attack on the Kamra Air Base of the Pakistan Air Force in Attock, Punjab. One security official was killed in the exchange while all eight militants who participated in the attack were shot dead by security forces. The TTP claimed the attack was in revenge for the deaths of Baitullah Mehsud and Osama bin Laden.
- August 16 Gunmen in Mansehra pulled 20 Shi'a Muslims out of a bus and shot them dead, in an incident of sectarian killing.
- August 17 Two people were killed and 18 others injured after a bomb went off near the Safari Park in Karachi. The blast happened as a bus was crossing the area. The bus was reportedly carrying passengers affiliated with the Imamia Students Organisation, a Shi'a student body, who were travelling to attend a Shi'a procession. The injured were shifted to Jinnah hospital.
- August 18 A suicide bomber blew up his explosive-laden car at a check post in Quetta overnight killing five people including three soldiers
- August 21 A blast ripped through Sariab road near Moosa Colony in Quetta killing two persons
- August 23 Militants on Thursday shot dead three police officers in the area of Hangu in Khyber Pakhtunkhwa province
- August 27 Gunmen shot dead eight people in attacks on two buses as rebels in Balochistan staged a strike to mark the anniversary of a tribal leader's death
- August 27 Three Shi'a Muslims were gunned down in Quetta.
- August 29Taliban militants have attacked a Pakistani army post near the Afghan border killing at least eight soldiers
- August 29Two people were killed and a further 10 injured when a bomb exploded on railway tracks Jacobabad
- August 30 Unidentified gunmen shot dead a Shia Muslim judge along with his driver and police bodyguard in Quetta
- August 31 A bomb ripped through a market in Peshawar, killing 11 people and injuring 16.
- September 1 Unidentified gunmen shot dead seven Shi'a Hazara civilians in the Hazar Ganji area of Quetta.
- September 3 A suicide bomber killed himself and two others when he drove a car bomb into a US consular vehicle in the Pakistani city of Peshawar
- September 10 Pakistan blast: Bomb 'kills 12' in Parachinar market
- September 15 An alleged terrorist was killed while preparing a suicide jacket in Dhoda area in Kohat
- September 16 Eight militants were killed when security forces pounded their positions in Khadezai area of Orakzai Agency
- September 16 Northwest Pakistan roadside bomb 'kills 14'
- September 17 The driver of a trailer, supplying goods to Nato forces in Afghanistan, was killed and his assistant received critical injuries when their vehicle was targeted by an explosive device on Peshawar-Torkham road
- September 18 Two policemen were injured when their vehicle was targeted by a roadside remote controlled bomb in Shagai Maidan, Lower Dir
- September 18 In Charsadda, the wife of a former councillor sustained injuries in a bomb blast in Shabqadar area
- September 19 At least six persons including an industrialist and two employees of a cellular phone company were kidnapped by suspected militants at gunpoint from main Peshawar-Kohat Road in Matani area
- September 19 Pakistan bomb blast kills 'at least nine' in Peshawar
- September 22 Two persons were killed in a roadside bomb blast while another explosive device was defused in lower Kurram Agency
- September 24 A security man was killed and another sustained injuries in a bomb blast in Jamrud tehsil of Khyber Agency
- September 24 In Nowshera, three policemen and two passers-by were injured when a van carrying prisoners was hit by a remote controlled bomb near Rashakai on Monday.
- September 25 Eight militants were killed and a security man injured in a clash in upper Orakzai Agency
- September 26 Unidentified gunmen shot dead three people including a senior official of the Geological Survey of Pakistan on Wednesday in Balochistan
- September 26 Mohsin Anwar Kazim, a member of the minority Shia community, was gunned down outside his office in Quetta, the Balochistan capital
- September 26 PPP activist Owais aka Fazlu who suffered serious wounds in an attack by assailants on Sep 26 in Surjani Town sector 7A died during treatment at a private hospital on October 18.
- September 27 Unknown assailants riding a motorcycle opened fire killing 2 people at Kala Gorh area in the jurisdiction of Paharpur police station.
- September 28 Militants destroy peace activist's house in Bara
- September 28 Peshawar blast kills top Pakistan bomb disposal officer and injured three police officers
- September 29 A woman was killed and two others received injuries when two mortar shells hit a residential area in Bara tehsil of Khyber Agency
- September 30 Unidentified assailants killed a policeman and injured another in an attack in Wari area of Upper Dir
- September 30 In Kurram Agency, a security man was killed and two others were injured in a landmine explosion on Sunday.

== October – December ==
- October 2 Police foiled a sabotage bid by defusing a five-kilogram bomb at Shaikhan area on the outskirts of Peshawar
- October 3 Three security men were injured in a blast near Gora Parai checkpost in Baizai tehsil of Mohmand tribal region
- October 3 a school was blown up by unidentified militants in Akora Khattak area in the small hours of Wednesday. Officials said that the building of government high school Adamzai was destroyed when explosives planted there by unidentified militants went off.
- October 3 In Peshawar, police defused a heavy bomb, planted on Frontier Road near Shaikhan village. An official said that the 10-kilogram bomb was planted at a bicycle, probably to target police.
- October 4 Peshawar: Frontier Corps (FC) man was killed by unknown gunmen in Ghani Kalay area in the vicinity of Daudzai police station.
- October 5 seven suspects from a feared Al-Qaeda-linked group had been arrested for allegedly plotting to attack school buses and prisons in Karachi. Police also recovered seven explosive-filled jackets, rockets and detonators.
- October 5 Six militants and one soldier were killed in exchange of fire when militants from Afghanistan side attacked a border security post in Gursal area
- October 6 At least five volunteers of a local tribal peace Lashkar were killed and seven others injured as militants attacked a position of the peace Lashkar in Bara tehsil of Khyber Agency
- October 6 the miscreants blew up a NATO container through an IED explosion in Jamrud Bazaar. No human losses reported in the explosion.
- October 6 The supply of electricity to Shalobar and adjoining areas was disrupted when militants blew up a power pylon at Naw Gazi Baba area of Bara tehsil in Khyber Agency
- October 7 At least six people lost lives and scores got injured when unknown gunmen opened fire during PPP's rally in Khairpur
- October 7 Miscreants attacked a car of security forces with remote control bomb in Risalpur city of Nowhera district, wounding two personnel
- October 7 A remote controlled bomb planted in the middle of Nowshera-Mardan Road exploded when an army truck was passing through the area. Two army men sustained injuries in the blast
- October 7 An unidentified militants blew up gas supply line in Hassanzai area on Saturday night, disrupting gas supply to a number of villages.
- October 7 The flour mill owner at Wah Cantonment, which was attacked allegedly by militants on Saturday evening in demand of large sum of money near Rawalpindi.
- October 8 A roadside bomb near a police checkpoint in Pakistan's south-west has left one person dead and at least 10 injured.
- October 8 Seven people were killed and 10 more injured when gunmen opened fire on a public meeting in a southern Pakistan village on Sunday night, according to Pakistani news outlet Dawn.
- October 8 a remote controlled bomb planted in the middle of Nowshera-Mardan Road exploded when an army truck was passing through the area near NOWSHERA.
- October 8 Eight persons were killed, including three gunned down in sectarian attacks, across the city Karachi
- October 8 At least twelve people including a child were injured when a bomb exploded near Zarghoon Road in Quetta
- October 9 Four people were killed and two others injured when a mortar fell on a house in the Orakzai tribal region in Peshawar
- October 9 Malala Yousafzai: Pakistan activist, 14, shot in Swat
- October 9 Three persons were injured when militants attacked a passenger vehicle near Paro village in lower Kurram Agency
- October 9 Two children were killed and one was seriously injured in a hand grenade blast. The children were playing with the hand grenade when it exploded with a bang in a street in College Town. Police said that the children had found the hand grenade in the street.
- October 9 In Peshawar, suspected militants blew up a government primary school for boys at Faqirabad Chowk in Badhber area. police official said that two bombs were planted under the foundation of the building that went off after at midnight. The blast, he said, damaged the building and furniture.
- October 9 In Charsadda, a government school was blown up in Malka Dher area on Tuesday. Sources said that unidentified militants planted an explosive device at the school that went off on Tuesday morning. As a result, the two rooms of building were destroyed completely. The furniture and record of the school was also destroyed. About 5 kilograms of explosives were used in the blast.
- October 10 PPP activist, policeman among nine killed across city
- October 10 A government primary school was blown up by unidentified militants at Usmanabad area of Akora Khattak, Nowshera. 4 to 6 kilograms of explosives were used in the blast.
- October 11 11 people were killed and 26 injured when a powerful bomb strapped to a motorbike exploded near a restaurant on Nishtar Road in Sibi. Police said the 15 kg explosive device damaged 12 shops and five vehicles
- October 11 In Dera Bugti district, three security personnel were killed and two severely injured when their vehicle struck a landmine in Maro area.
- October 11 A worker of a construction company was killed when a bomb exploded on G.T. Road, NOWSHERA. three to four kilograms of explosive were used in the blast.
- October 11 At least four people were killed and nine injured in incidents of violence across the city Karachi
- October 12 Masked gunmen killed three people, including a pro-government tribal elder in an attack on his car on the outskirts of Miranshah, officials said.
- October 12 Five persons were killed and 22 others injured when twin blasts ripped through a local market in Orakzai Agency. The Tehreek-e-Taliban Pakistan (TTP), Orakzai Agency chapter, claimed responsibility for the two blasts. 25 kg of explosives were used in the blasts.
- October 12 Eleven persons were killed in a blast in Sibi on Thursday.Geo TV reported that a remote controlled bomb planted in a rickshaw went off on Nishter Road in Sibi, killing 11 persons including two children and injuring 26 others.
- October 12 three personnel were killed and another sustained injuries in a landmine blast in Dera Bugti.
- October 13 At least 15 people were killed and 25 were wounded in a car bomb blast in Kohat's Darra Adam Khel area
- October 13 Five people were killed and four seriously injured in a clash between two militant groups in the Orakzai tribal region, Peshawar.
- October 14 A policeman killed when militants opened fire on a police raiding party in Peshawar's Bara Shaikhan area, one militant was also killed in retaliatory firing by the police
- October 14 a soldier of Frontier Constabulary was killed when militants attacked a party of law enforcers in Shaikhan village in Peshawar. Police and FC were patrolling Shaikhan village when militants attacked them. Mohammad Ayaz, a soldier of FC, was killed on the spot.
- October 14 In Khyber Agency, a security man and a militant were killed in an exchange of fire in Bara tehsil on Sunday. Officials said that a joint patrolling party of Khasadar and Frontier Constabulary was ambushed by militants in Akkakhel.
- October 14 A homemade bomb was recovered from Nagshah Chowk, Multan. Two blasts had occurred at the same place last night, where this evening former prime minister Yusuf Raza Gilani is scheduled to address a Pakistan People's Party (PPP) public meeting.
- October 14 A political activist was gunned down by unknown motorcycle-riding attackers in Landhi, Karachi, on Sunday. Another man and a four-year-old girl also suffered injuries in the attack.
- October 15 Armed men on a motorbike opened fire at a vehicle on Sattar Road, killing Mohammad Ismail and his brother Ishaq. They belonged to the Shia community, also injured 3 others.
- October 15 Superintendent of Police (Rural) Khurshid Khan and six others, including police and Frontier Constabulary (FC) personnel, were killed whereas 12 others were injured when more 300 militants attacked a police check post set up on the main Peshawar-Kohat Road in the Matni area on the outskirts of Peshawar Khurshid Khan's severed head was later reunited with his body when his family paid Rs 3.5 million.
- October 15 According to the TTP spokesman Ihsanullah Ihsan, the banned group killed SP, ten police and FC men, and abducted several personnel. Ihsanullah Ihsan said that the attack was in return to the raid which was launched by the security forces on Taliban training camps in Peshawar.
- October 15 A community health centre was partially damaged in a blast in Bar Taras area of Salarzia tehsil in Bajaur Agency
- October 15 Five workers of the outlawed Ahle Sunnat Wal Jamaat were gunned down in two separate acts of violence in Karachi
- October 15 An activist of the Sunni Tehrik was shot dead in New Karachi on Monday
- October 15 a 13-year-old boy was seriously injured when explosive device went off in Hilalkhail area of Charming on Monday. Local sources said that some boys were playing in a field when an explosive device planted by militants exploded, seriously injuring Usman.
- October 16 Gunmen shot dead four people from the Shia community on Tuesday, in what appears to be a fresh sectarian attack in Pakistan's troubled southwestern province of Balochistan
- October 16 Four members of the ethnic Hazara community were killed in an attack apparently motivated by sectarian hatred in Quetta on Tuesday.
- October 17 An inspector of the Karachi Municipal Corporation was gunned down by gunmen on Shahrah-i-Noor Jehan on Wednesday.
- October 17 Another policeman was killed and his colleague was wounded in an attack on a police kiosk in F.B Industrial Area of Karachi.
- October 17 Three Awami National Party workers were gunned down in Par Hoti area, Mardan on Wednesday night.
- October 17 militants fired 12 rockets on Mina, Sapary and Bandagi villages close to Pak-Afghan border. He said two rockets hit a house injuring a 14-year-old girl.
- October 17 Police on Wednesday evening repulsed a militant attack on their checkpost in Mashogagar area on the outskirts of Peshawar. An official said, several militants armed with rocket launchers and Kalashnikovs attacked the post but they had to flee after police opened fire on them.
- October 17 A gunman opened fire on two men in Buleda, killing them on the spot. The victims belonged to Khyber-Pakhtunkhwa.
- October 17 An armed man opened fire on a tanker on National Highway, in the jurisdiction of Saddar Police Station, Dera Murad Jamali. As a result, a person identified as Muhammad Umair lost his life while the driver sustained injuries
- October 18 PPP activist Mohammad Zeeshan was killed and his colleague suffered bullet wounded when assailants riding a motorcycle opened fire on them near a roundabout in Sector 11-L near Hussain Chowk Orangi Town Karachi.
- October 18 A man (identified as Mohammad Arshad) was gunned down by motorcycle-riding attackers in Nazimabad Karachi on Thursday.
- October 18 A man identified as Shahbaz Memon, was gunned down by motorcycle-riding attackers and another was wounded in old city area on Thursday.
- October 19 In the Saeedabad area of Karachi, a car carrying four persons was targeted by armed attackers. The attack left one dead and three injured.
- October 19 two people were killed and one was injured in a firing incident near Abul Hassan Ispahani Road, Karachi after the rally organised by ASWJ
- October 19 PPP MPA injured in firing incident in Karachi
- October 19 A bomb planted on a bicycle killed at least three paramilitary soldiers in a restive southwestern Pakistani city Quetta and wounded 10 other people on Friday
- October 19 A police head constable and a Pakistan Qaumi Razakar volunteer were shot dead by four armed men riding two motorcycles in Sohrab Goth, Karachi, raising the death toll of policemen killed in the city during the year to 69.
- October 19 Military gunship helicopters pounded suspected militant hideouts after unidentified gunmen killed a security official in Civil Colony Miranshah, headquarters of North Waziristan on Friday.
- October 19 A Frontier Corps constable was killed and five others were wounded when armed men attacked a check post in restive Dera Bugti district on Friday
- October 20 four armed assailants on two motorcycles fired a volley of bullets at family killing a person and injured 3 others near Dakkhana Chowrangi, Karachi.
- October 20 Twin blasts were reported in the suburban areas of Peshawar Saturday morning and fortunately no casualty was reported.
- October 20 A young worker of the Muttahida Qaumi Movement, hailing from Mansehra, was shot dead in the city of Karachi.
- October 20 Police said, two bombs planted by suspected militants along Bara-Shaikhan Road of Peshawar went off at around 7am.
- October 22 Twin blasts in Swabi: K-P chief minister's convoy escapes bomb attack. Eight people, including police personnel, were injured in two explosions in Swabi district on Monday.
- October 23 Two member of the Ahmadi community, a policeman were gunned down in Sector 8, Karachi on Tuesday.
- October 23 Two persons including a suspected militant were shot dead while another was injured during a search operation in Akkakhel area of Bara. Sources said that the operation was conducted jointly by army and Frontier Corps.
- October 23 Three personnel of Frontier Constabulary (FC) were injured in a blast on Frontier Road on the outskirts of Peshawar on Tuesday. militants had planted a four-kilogram heavy bomb along the roadside.
- October 23 In Lakki Marwat, a villager was seriously injured in a bomb explosion near a primary school in Nar Bakhmal Ahmadzai area on Tuesday. while police and security forces reached the area and defused another homemade explosive device planted inside the school building.
- October 23 Commandant Khyber Rifles Col Fayaz on Tuesday handed over 35 Kukikhel and three Zakhakhel tribesmen, arrested during Ghundi operation. The commandant also returned 24 light weapons, seized during the operation.
- October 24 A bridge and few houses were damaged in a blast near Bacha Khan Markaz, Peshawar. the bomb was planted along Pejagi Road to target the law-enforcers. However, terrorists failed to achieve their target, no casualty was reported in the blast.
- October 24 a labourer, was critically injured along with three other colleagues when a mortar shell fell on a factory in Alamgudar area of Sipah, near Landi Kotal.
- October 24 In Mohmand Agency, suspected militants blew up two government primary schools in Halim Zai Tehsil on Wednesday morning. Sources said that militants planted explosive devices at the buildings of primary schools for boys in Wazir Kallay and Khwajawas Kor areas in the night that went off on Wednesday morning. As a result, both the buildings were destroyed completely.
- October 24 In Swabi, suspected militants blew up a government middle school in New Nehar Jahangira on Wednesday. Police said that two classrooms of the school were destroyed completely while the third one was damaged in the pre-dawn blast.
- October 25 Eight militants were killed when helicopter gunships pounded militant hideouts in Bara tehsil of Khyber Agency
- October 25 In Hangu, a girl was killed and three persons were injured in a bomb blast in Gulshan Colony on Thursday.a six-kilogram heavy bomb was planted in the backyard of the house, City police station registered a case against unidentified terrorists and launched investigations.
- October 25 Security forces claimed on Thursday to have killed a suspected militant in Bagan area of lower Kurram. A pistol and a hand grenade were reportedly recovered from his possession.
- October 28 Three killed, 25 injured in Nowshera blast
- November 2 At least 18 people, including women and children, were killed and several injured in a fire when unknown gunmen opened fire on a bus outside a petrol station in Khuzdar, south-west Pakistan.
- November 3 At least Four people, including two Bohras and an MQM office bearer killed in shooting incidents in Hyderabad.
- November 3 Human rights activist and journalist Marvi Sirmed was shot at in Islamabad, but escaped unhurt.
- November 3 The Phandu baba Sufi shrine at Chamkani, near Peshawar was bombed and partially destroyed. This was the third such incident in a week.
- November 3 Fateh Khan, the head of the local anti-Taliban militia, and five others were killed by a TTP suicide bomber in Daggr, north-west Pakistan.
- November 3 A doctor reported treating two girls in Parachinar, northern Pakistan, in October, who had been victims of an acid attack by Pakistani Taliban opposed to female education. One boy was shot and one injured in the same incident.
- November 4 Three killed in a shooting incident in Hyderabad.
- November 5 Two Pakistani Khasadar militia personnel injured in a blast during search operations in Pakistan's tribal belt.
- November 6 Agha Aftab Haider Jaffari, a prominent Shia leader was shot dead in Quetta. The past few months have witnessed hundreds of Shia Muslims across Pakistan being killed by pro-Taliban elements.
- November 6 Four people, including three Hazaras were killed and two injured in shooting incidents in Quetta.
- November 7 Assistant Superintendent of Police Hilal Haider and at least four others were killed and 30 injured by a TTP suicide bomber in Peshawar.
- November 7 At least three killed and ten, including a police officer, injured in a blast at Sadda, Khurram Agency, Pakistan.
- November 8 Two killed and 21 injured in suicide bombing at the gate of Pakistani Rangers' headquarter in Karachi.
- November 19 The former chief of the Jamaat-i-Islami (JI), Pakistan's largest religio-political party, narrowly escaped a bomb attack on Monday as a female suicide bomber detonated her explosives near his convoy in northwest Mohmand tribal agency Four people, including the bodyguard of the former JI chief, were injured in the attack, officials said. A vehicle was also damaged although Ahmad's vehicle was not damaged or hit by the force of the blast.
- November 22 A series of three bomb attacks in Pakistan (Karachi, Rawalpindi & Quetta) killed at least 37 people, and 92 others injured.
- November 24 8 people were killed and several injured after bomb exploded in Ashoura procession of Shi'ites in Dera Ismail Khan.
- December 15 At least 5 dead over 25 injured as rockets hit an airport near Peshawar
- December 22 A suicide blast in the Qissa Khawani Bazaar area of Peshawar killed KP Senior Minister Bashir Ahmad Bilour and 8 others.
