= Upper Orakzai =

Constituency of the National Assembly of Pakistan

Upper Orakzai is a National Assembly constituency situated in the Orakzai Agency in the Federally Administered Tribal Areas of Pakistan.

Some of main areas of Upper Orakzai include:

- Sampoga
- Ghotak Eisa khel
- Dabori
- Zanka khel
- Zakhtan
- Sama Mamoozi
- Arghunja
- Mir kalam khel
- Stara kada
- Swaro kot
- Ghiljo
- Kandi Mishti
- Khwaga seri/sarka
- Yakh kandow
- Buland Khel
