= Maulvi Nazir =

Afghan-Pakistani Taliban commander

- Born: c. 1975
- Died: 2 January 2013; Angur Ada, Khyber Pakhtunkhwa, Pakistan
- Cause of death: Drone strike
- Citizenship: Afghanistan, Pakistan
- Organization: Taliban

Maulvi Nazir (c. 1975 - 2 January 2013), also known as Mullah Nazir, or Maulvi Nazir Wazir, (Pashto: مولوي نذیر وزیر) was a prominent commander of the Pakistani Taliban in South Waziristan based in Wana. He was a dual citizen of Afghanistan and Pakistan, and had a significant role in Taliban affairs in both countries. He was killed by a US drone strike on 2 January 2013.

== Early life ==
Nazir was a member of the Kakakhel tribe, which have Sayyid origins and are a part of the Ahmadzai, which are part of the Wazir. He was estimated to have been born in 1975. He had citizenship of both Afghanistan and Pakistan, and owned property in Kandahar until 2010. During the Soviet–Afghan War and ensuing Afghan civil wars, he was affiliated with Hezbe Islami Gulbuddin. He later joined the Taliban and aligned himself politically with the JUI party of Fazal-ur-Rehman. In Pakistan, he controlled large portions of South Waziristan, and maintained his influence in the Afghan provinces of Paktika, Zabul, Helmand, and Kandahar.

== Career ==
With the notable approval of Mullah Dadullah and Sirajuddin Haqqani, Maulvi Nazir was authorised to implement Sharia in South Waziristan in 2006, and the Afghan Taliban had instructed him to avoid confrontations with the Pakistani army.

Maulvi Nazir eventually overthrew Maulvi Omar and became the leader of the Taliban in Wana. Maulvi Omar was close to Baitullah Mehsud, a rival of Maulvi Nazir. Throughout his conflict with Baitullah Mehsud, Maulvi Nazir was supported by the Afghan Taliban, who opposed Baitullah Mehsud due to his attacks on Pakistan. In 2006, Mullah Omar endorsed Maulvi Nazir as the emir of South Waziristan. Mullah Omar later disassociated himself from Baitullah Mehsud after he continued to attack Pakistan.

In March 2007, Maulvi Nazir ordered the expulsion of all Uzbeks from Waziristan, and sparked the 2007 Wana clashes against the Islamic Movement of Uzbekistan (IMU) led by Tahir Yuldashev. Maulvi Nazir later succeeded in expelling the Uzbeks.

Tensions continued between Maulvi Nazir and Baitullah Mehsud. In early 2009, Mullah Omar asked Maulvi Nazir and Baitullah Mehsud to put aside differences and aid the Afghan Taliban in combating the American presence in Afghanistan. Maulvi Nazir, Baitullah Mehsud, and Hafiz Gul Bahadur agreed to form Shura Ittihad ul-Mujahideen to focus on fighting NATO in Afghanistan. Shortly after the establishment of the union, tensions resurged between Baitullah Mehsud and Maulvi Nazir, and the union collapsed. Baitullah Mehsud was later killed on August 5, 2009.

The tensions between Maulvi Nazir and the mainstream TTP continued until a peace deal between Maulvi Nazir and Hakimullah Mehsud was reached in 2011.

== Death ==
Maulvi Nazir was killed by an American drone strike on 2 January 2013 in Angur Ada, near the capital of Wana, South Waziristan. Bahawal Khan, also known as Salahuddin Ayubi, was his successor.
