= Fedayeen al-Islam =

Pakistani militant group

Fedayeen al-Islam (also spelled Fedayan-i-Islam, variously translated as "Islamic Commandos" or "Islamic Patriots") was a militant group in Pakistan under the leadership of Hakimullah Mehsud, who was a deputy to Baitullah Mehsud in the Tehrik-i-Taliban Pakistan (TTP) prior to Baitullah's death. After Baitullah's death in August 2009, Hakimullah assumed leadership of the TTP. The group hasn’t reported any activities since 2010.

== Alleged attacks ==
=== Islamabad Hotel Bombing ===
The group claimed responsibility for the Islamabad Marriott Hotel bombing.

After the Islamabad Marriott Hotel bombing, the group called Arabiya's correspondent in the Pakistani capital, Islamabad. The correspondent said he received a text message on his mobile phone showing a telephone number. He said he called the number and then heard a recording in which the group admitted launching Saturday's attack. The Arabiya television correspondent said the speaker spoke in English with a South Asian accent. The Fedayeen Islam group has issued several demands including for Pakistan to stop its cooperation with the United States.

=== Lahore Police Academy Attacks ===
Fedayeen al-Islam claimed responsibility for the 2009 Lahore police academy attacks.

=== 2009 April 4 Islamabad Attack ===
Fedayeen al-Islam claimed responsibility for a suicide bombing in the capital that killed eight troops.

=== 2009 April 5 Chakwal Attack ===
The group also claimed responsibility for a suicide bombing that targeted a Shia mosque in Chakwal, Punjab province. 24 people died in the attack.
