= Wali-ur-Rehman =

Taliban spokesman

Senior Commander of the Tehrik-e-Taliban Pakistan
- In office ? – 29 May 2013
- Preceded by: Baitullah Mehsud

Personal details
- Born: 1970 South Waziristan, Pakistan
- Died: 29 May 2013 (aged 42–43) Chashma, Miranshah, North Waziristan, Pakistan
- Other political affiliations: Jamiat Ulema-e-Islam (prior to joining the Taliban in 2004)
- Education: Jamia Islamia Imdadia, Faisalabad

Wali-ur-Rehman (Wali Ur-Rehman Mehsud) (1970 – 29 May 2013) was a senior Tehrik-e-Taliban Pakistan (TTP) commander based in South Waziristan. Wali-ur-Rehman was formerly a spokesman for Baitullah Mehsud, the late leader of the TTP.

== Background ==
Wali-ur-Rehman's family hails from the Mal Khel branch of the Mehsud tribe in South Waziristan. In 1996, he finished studies at the Jamia Islamia Imdadia madrassa in Faisalabad and returned to South Waziristan to teach in a madrassa in Kani Guram. He was affiliated with the Jamiat Ulema-e-Islam (JUI-F) party prior to joining the Taliban in 2004.

Following Baitullah Mehsud's death in a missile attack launched from a Predator drone, a shura convened to choose his successor to lead the Pakistani Taliban. Wali-ur-Rehman was considered a contender for leadership. On 9 August 2009, it was rumored that a heated exchange at the shura escalated to open gunfire, and Wali-ur-Rehman allegedly shot Hakimullah Mehsud, another leadership contender. Rehman called a Reuters reporter to deny that there was fighting or a shura. He and Hakimullah later telephoned the BBC to confirm the death of Baitullah Mehsud.

On 2 November 2009, Pakistani authorities offered a Rs50 million ($600,000) reward for information that leads to the capture or killing of Wali-ur-Rehman. They offered the same reward for similar information regarding Hakimullah Mehsud and Qari Hussain and smaller rewards for 16 other TTP militants. On 1 September 2010, the United States added he and Hakimullah Mehsud to its list of Specially Designated Global Terrorists and the TTP to its list of Foreign Terrorist Organizations. On 26 August 2011, an interview with him was aired on Al-Arabiya TV, in which he threatened to "wreak vengeance" on the U.S. and NATO (especially France and Britain) with "an attack greater than 9/11."

== Death ==
On 29 May 2013, Wali-ur-Rehman was reportedly killed by a US drone strike on a compound in the Chashma area of Miranshah, the main town of the North Waziristan tribal region in northwest Pakistan near the border with Afghanistan. The strike also killed six of his associates. His death was confirmed by Tehrik-e-Taliban spokesman Ehsanullah Ehsan on 30 May 2013.

== Retaliatory attack ==
In retaliation, the Jundul Hafsa group of the Taliban took credit for storming the base camp of the mountain Nanga Parbat. Two guides were abducted, who led them to a site where 10 foreign tourists were killed, including two Chinese, one Chinese-American and one Nepalese. Other reports said five Ukrainians and one Russian were killed. A Taliban spokesman stated "By killing foreigners, we wanted to give a message to the world to play their role in bringing an end to the drone attacks."

== See also ==
- List of Deobandis
