= Hafiz Saeed (disambiguation) =

Hafiz Saeed (born 1950) is a Pakistani Islamist militant, the co-founder of Lashkar-e-Taiba and the chief of Jama'at-ud-Da'wah.

Hafiz Saeed may also refer to:

- Hafiz Ihsan Saeed, inmate at Guantanamo Bay detention camp until 2005
- Hafiz Saeed Khan (1972–2016), an Islamic militant who served as the Islamic State emir for its Khorasan province, which is active in Afghanistan and Pakistan
