= Qari Zain =

- Born: Pakistan
- Died: 23 June 2009; Dera Ismail Khan, Pakistan
- Military career
- Allegiance: Tehrik-i-Taliban Pakistan

Qari Zainuddin Mehsud (died 23 June 2009), commonly known as Qari Zain, was a citizen of Pakistan, a member of the Mehsud tribe, and a leader of the Tehrik-i-Taliban Pakistan (TTP/Pakistani Taliban) in South Waziristan, one of Pakistan's Federally Administered Tribal Areas. Pakistan's Daily Times described him as the "self-appointed successor of Taliban commander Abdullah Mehsud" although he feuded with Baitullah Mehsud over leadership of the Pakistani Taliban. In the months before his assassination, the Pakistani government unofficially supported Zainuddin as a counter to Baitullah.

== Life ==
Qari Zainuddin, a member of the Shaman Khel sub-clan of the Mehsud tribe, was born in Shaho Deeba village of South Waziristan's Sarokai subdivision. He received education from the Jami'a Speen Mosque, the Darul Uloom Faizoo in Lakki Marwat and also in the seminary of Maulana Taqi Usmani in Korangi, Karachi. After his education, he traveled in support of the Taliban to Afghanistan.

Zainuddin joined Abdullah Mehsud, his cousin, after Abdullah attempted to assert his leadership of the Pakistani Taliban in the wake of Nek Muhammad Wazir's death in 2004. After Abdullah and later his brother Masudur Rahman were killed, Qari Zain assumed leadership of the Abdullah Mehsud faction.

== Rivalry within Pakistani Taliban ==
After Nek Muhammad's death, Abdullah Mehsud and Baitullah Mehsud both vied for dominance of the Pakistani Taliban. When Abdullah died in a raid by Pakistani security forces and later his successor perished in a bomb explosion, Qari Zain and other members of Abdullah's faction suspected that Baitullah played a role in the attacks. The rivalry continued after Zainuddin obtained leadership of Abdullah's group.

Senior Taliban leader Maulvi Nazir, whose relationship with Baitullah had deteriorated over the issue of sheltering Uzbek militants, offered his support to Zainuddin. After Nazir and Baitullah, along with Hafiz Gul Bahadur, pledged in February 2009 to set aside their differences to focus efforts upon NATO forces in Afghanistan, Qari Zain's forces allied with a group led by Turkestan Bhittani, an older Taliban figure who had unofficially aligned with the government in its fight against Baitullah.

In March 2009 the two competing factions distributed pamphlets that leveled accusations against the other groups' leader.

Zainuddin's pamphlet, distributed on 16 March, stated:

- "Baitullah Mehsud is not involved in jihad because Islam does not allow suicide attacks, which his group is perpetrating."
- "Our doors are open to all those who have suffered injustice at the hands of Baitullah."
- "We also warn people against keeping contacts with Baitullah or facilitating him in prolonging his rule."

In response Baitullah Mehsud called Abdullah Mehsud (and indirectly Zainuddin as Abdullah's successor) a "puppet of the government", and said: "Zainuddin and his comrades are cruel robbers and have rebelled against Islam and the [Mehsud] nation."

In a June 2009 interview with Geo News, Qari Zainuddin Mehsud said that "Islam cannot spread with the use of force but with invitation," and added that he was against suicide attacks inside Pakistan. He also distanced himself from the TTP by denouncing the organization and reaffirmed his commitment to the cause of Tehrik-e-Taliban Afghanistan. "We are Tehreek-e-Taliban Afghanistan, and we have nothing to do with Tehreek-e-Taliban Pakistan." Zainuddin and Turkestan Bhittani held a jirga with about a hundred Mehsud tribal elders to rally against Baitullah Mehsud.

=== Personal rivalry with Baitullah ===
The rivalry between Qari Zain and Baitullah also had a personal aspect in addition to their respective differences over preferred methods and goals. Baitullah had killed several of Zainuddin's family members, including his father. Just six days before Qari Zainuddin's death he said in interview with Geo TV,"Islam does not allow carrying out activities within Pakistan and this is the main cause that led to the difference with Baitullah Mehsud."He said scholars like Maulana Hasan Jan declared suicide attacks as un-Islamic. The declaration led to the killing of Maulan Hasan by Baitullah.He said "Islam cannot spread with the use of force but with invitation," Qari Zain observed he also clarified, "We are Tehreek-e-Taliban Afghanistan and we have nothing to do with Tehreek-e-Taliban Pakistan,".

== Assassination ==
On 23 June 2009, Qari Zainuddin Mehsud was killed in Dera Ismail Khan by bodyguard Gulbadin Mehsud, who escaped after the attack. According to Baz Mohammad, who was also wounded and was one of Zainuddin's aides, the gunman attacked immediately following morning prayers. Zainuddin was pronounced dead at the hospital from multiple gunshot wounds to the head and chest. Mohammad placed blame for the attack upon Baitullah Mehsud.

At the funeral, Turkestan Bhittani vowed to continue the fight against Baitullah Mehsud. After the ceremony Zainuddin's brother Misabhuddin was appointed the new leader of the Abdullah Mehsud group. Misabhuddin told BBC News that he would not rest until Baitullah's death and that he would continue the "jihad against American and its allies in Afghanistan."

== See also ==
- Operation Black Thunderstorm
