= Ahmadzai =

Ahmadzai may refer to:

- Ahmadzai (Wazir clan), a tribe found in Pakistan
- Ahmadzai (Ghilji clan), a subgroup within the Suleiman Khel tribe found in Afghanistan
