= 2009 Lahore police academy attack =

2009 terrorist attack in Pakistan

- Location: 31°35′33″N 74°26′46″E; Lahore, Pakistan
- Date: 30 March 2009; 07:31 – 15:30 (UTC+05:00)
- Attack type: Siege and occupation
- Weapons: machine guns and grenades or rocket propelled grenades
- Deaths: One civilian, five police trainees, two instructors, eight militants
- Injuries: 95
- Perpetrators: Pakistani Taliban; Fedayeen al-Islam
- No. of participants: 12
- Defenders: Pakistan police cadets and Elite Police force.

At 07:31 on 30 March 2009, the Manawan Police Academy in Lahore, Pakistan, was attacked by an estimated 12 gunmen. The perpetrators were armed with automatic weapons and grenades or rockets and some were dressed as policemen. They took over the main building during a morning parade when 750 unarmed police recruits were present on the compound's parade ground. Police forces arrived 90 minutes later and were able to take back the building by 15:30. Five trainees, two instructors and a passer-by were killed. Five of the attackers were killed in the fighting and three more blew themselves up to avoid arrest. A suspect was captured alive in a field near the school and three others were taken into custody as they tried to escape in police uniforms. The four were taken to undisclosed locations for interrogation by the security forces according to local media.

== Initial attacks ==
Lahore within Punjab Province, Pakistan

The Manawan Police Academy is a training school of the Pakistan Police located on the outskirts of Lahore. At around 07:30, at least 12 gunmen, some dressed in police uniform, attacked the academy during the morning drill hour when around 750 unarmed police recruits were on parade. The gunmen apparently gained access to the site by scaling the perimeter wall before causing three or four explosions on the parade ground, using grenades or rockets, and opening fire with automatic weapons. Several civilians on the road adjacent to the compound were hit by fire from the gunmen apparently when the gunmen attacked a police guard detachment near to a gate.

The academy had only been in a peacetime defensive stance and probably contained just a small armoury of outdated weapons. The attackers proceeded across the parade ground and stormed the academy building, taking hostages from the police trainees and establishing three or four defensive positions including one on the rooftop.

== Siege ==
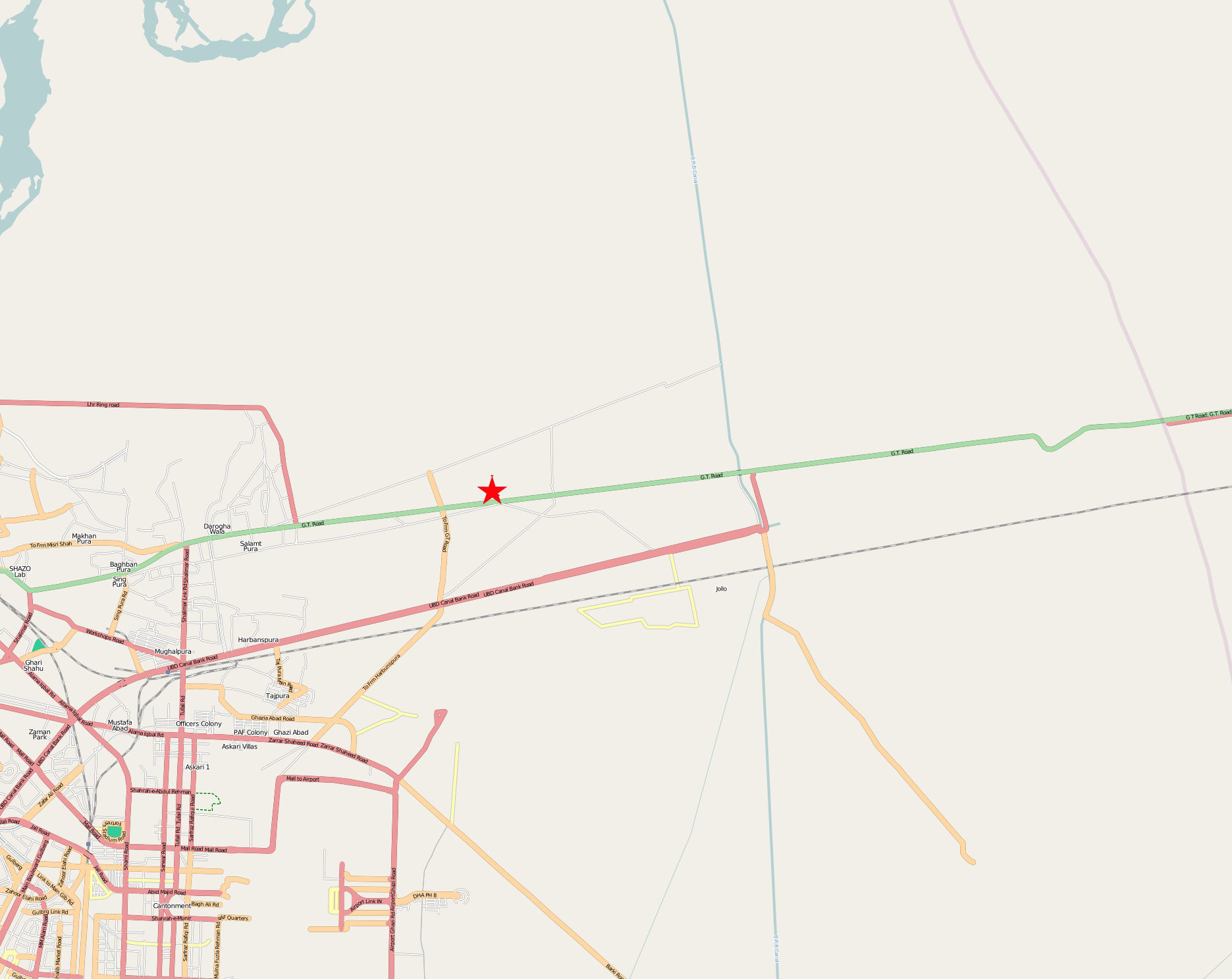
Red star depicts the Manawan Police Training School. The vertical line on right is the border with India

Elite forces of the Punjab Police arrived on the site within 90 minutes of the attack and were cheered on by a crowd of spectators. The security forces took up position on rooftops around the compound, firing on the gunmen and sealing off any escape routes. The gunmen returned fire with automatic weaponry and grenades and also shot at a police helicopter. Several hours into the attack, security forces used explosives to storm the building and retake it from the gunmen after ten to fifteen minutes of sustained firing, capturing the building by 15:30. During the course of the attack and siege, eight police personnel, two civilians and eight gunmen were killed and 95 people injured. At least four of the gunmen have been captured alive by the security forces.

A curfew was imposed in the area surrounding the academy. Several hundred civilians poured in from close by localities to watch the operation despite the "curfew-like" conditions in the area. Elite forces declared victory signs on completion of the successful operation. Punjab Police resorted to aerial firing and chanted slogans of Allahu Akbar after the siege successfully ended and hostages were freed and at least three of the would-be suicide bombers were caught alive.

== Claims of responsibility ==
=== Baitullah Mehsud ===
The leader of Tehrik-i-Taliban, Baitullah Mehsud, took responsibility for the attack. "Yes, we have carried out this attack. I will give details later", Mehsud, an al Qaeda–linked leader based in the Waziristan tribal region told Reuters by telephone. He also said that his next target would be Washington D.C.

Mehsud was also accused by the Pakistani government of carrying out the assassination of Pakistani politician and first female prime minister Benazir Bhutto during a political rally in December 2007.

=== Fedayeen al-Islam ===
Fedayeen al-Islam, a previously unknown group, claimed responsibility for the assault and added that it would carry out more attacks unless Pakistani troops withdraw from the tribal areas near the Afghan border and the US end drone attacks in the country.

== Arrests ==
A person named Hijratullah, believed to be part of the group of attackers, was apprehended by local citizens when he was seen hiding in the nearby fields at first and then moving slowly towards the rescue helicopters with two grenades in his hand. He was confirmed by authorities as a resident of Paktika province of Afghanistan. Authorities also confirmed later to have arrested 3 more attackers after the Rangers forced them to lay down their arms. Another gunman Hazrat Gull of Miranshah in Waziristan was also arrested. Ten suspects belonging to a religious organisation were arrested from Sukkur. Police also arrested Qari Ishtiaq, who was said to be the commander of the Punjabi Taliban. He was arrested from Bahawalpur on the information provided by the Hijratullah who was jailed for 10 years due to his role. Seven other militants were arrested from different parts of Punjab based on his information.

== Reaction ==
President Asif Ali Zardari and Prime Minister Yousuf Raza Gilani of Pakistan both condemned the attacks.

Interior Minister Rehman Malik placed security services on high alert across the country and pointed the finger at extremist groups and hinted Indian involvement. Further he stated that fighters loyal to Baitullah Mehsud were believed to have carried out the attack. Rehman Malik said that all these terrorist outfits were receiving weapons and funds from outside the country. He said "Some rival country, or some hostile intelligence agency is definitely out to destabilise our democratic forces". He said the attack was impeccably planned. India condemned the attack and offered condolences.

== See also ==
- Violence in Pakistan 2006–09, table and map providing overview of all violence in Pakistan between 2006 and 2009.
