= Orakzai Scouts =

Pakistani paramilitary unit

- Urdu: اورکزئی اسکاؤٹس
- Active: 1 August 2007
- Country: Pakistan
- Allegiance: Ministry of Interior
- Branch: Frontier Corps
- Type: Regiment
- Role: Border patrol Counterterrorism; COIN; Law enforcement
- Size: 6 Wings
- Part of: Frontier Corps Khyber Pakhtunkhwa (South)
- Garrison/HQ: Kalaya
- Mottos: بريالی,'Victorious'
- Engagements: War on terror; Insurgency in Khyber Pakhtunkhwa; Operation Khyber; Dara Adam-Khel Offensive

Commanders
- Commander: Tasneem Khan
- Previous commandant: Rai Kashif Amin

The Orakzai Scouts is a regiment sized unit of the Frontier Corps KPK (south)'s South-Western Sector Headquarters. The unit guards the Afghanistan-Pakistan border in various areas and also supports law & order within Orakzai District.

== History ==
The regiment was raised in 2007 by colonel Arshad Mehmood. The Scouts have been involved in anti-drug smuggling operations. In 2011-2012, the unit received a number of drug testing kits, through a United Nations program, to assist in their work against drug smuggling. One initiative in August 2021 saw the Scouts 235 Wing organise training to help farmers find alternatives to poppy cultivation such as mushroom farming.

The regiment has been involved in combatting the insurgency in Khyber Pakhtunkhwa. Shortly after the start of Operation Khyber by the Pakistani military, eight soldiers were killed in November 2014, when militants attacked a check post. Twenty militants were killed in an immediate counterattack by the regiment.

In July 2019 members of the regiment helped rescue up to 47 injured people and retrieved the bodies of 8 children, after they became trapped in a collapsed house following a rainstorm.

The regiment has also engaged in local culture recently. In partnership with provincial and local government bodies in March 2022, it organised a two-day local sports festival in Kalaya including a kabaddi competition. The commandant attended a motoring event in December 2022.

== Structure ==
The unit is composed of a headquarters wing with six battalion-sized maneuver wings and a special operations group. It had a 2020/21 budget of Rs. 1.83 billion

- Headquarters Wing
- 231 Wing
- 232 Wing
- 233 Wing

- 234 Wing
- 235 Wing
- 236 Wing
- Special Operation Group
