= September 2007 bombings in Rawalpindi =

Terrorist attack in Pakistan

The 4 September 2007 Rawalpindi bombings refer to the incident on 4 September 2007 in which suicide bombers attacked a bus carrying government workers in a commercial district of Rawalpindi. Twenty-five people were killed and 68 injured. Police increased security in the nearby Pakistani capital of Islamabad.

== Events ==
The bombs exploded after 7:20 am near the army General Headquarters and other top military sites. One attack was aimed at a Defence Ministry bus picking up army staff passengers and an explosives-laden motorcycle caused the second attack, near a market.

=== Bus attack ===
At 7:20 am, the front of a bus carrying army staff passengers exploded, blowing off the vehicle's roof and destroying all but the rearmost seats. Although Interior Ministry spokesman Javed Iqbal Cheema referred to the attack as a suicide bombing, a local police officer stated the bomb might have been previously planted.

=== Motorcycle ===
Approximately fifteen minutes after the first blast, a suicide bomber crashed a motorcycle into nearby vehicles, killing at least one colonel.

== Suspects ==
Preliminary investigations concerning the September 2007 bombings in Rawalpindi note that the Taliban figure Baitullah Mehsud is the primary suspect behind the attacks.
