= Shahidullah Shahid =

Pakistani Islamic militant

- Born: Sheikh Maqbool Orakzai; Pakistan
- Died: 9 July 2015; Afghanistan
- Other name: Abu Umar Maqbool al Khurasani

Sheikh Maqbool Orakzai (died 9 July 2015), known as Shahidullah Shahid and later as Abu Umar Maqbool al Khurasani, was a Pakistani Islamic militant who had senior roles in both the Tehrik-i-Taliban Pakistan (TTP) and the Islamic State's province in Afghanistan and Pakistan.

== History ==
=== Tehrik-i-Taliban Pakistan ===
Shahid served as a top spokesman for the militant group TTP since it was formed in 2006.

=== Islamic State ===
On 21 October 2014 he was sacked by the TTP for his pledge of allegiance to Abu Bakr al-Baghdadi and the Islamic State, which he had made a week prior.

== Death ==
On 9 July 2015, he was killed in an American airstrike in Dih Bala District, Nangarhar Province, Afghanistan. Gul Zaman, a militant commander from Pakistan’s Orakzai tribal region, was also killed in the strike.
