= Wachpal =

Wachpal is a village covering a very large area of Orakzai Agency and a little bit of Khyber Agency in tribal area of Pakistan. It's a linkage village between Orakzai and Khyber Agencies. Two main tribes from both of the mentioned agencies have been living there since 1940. Qammar Khel tribe belongs to Khyber Agency and Mishthee Tribe belongs to Orakzai Agency. It has a plan area covered by a sequence of large mountains. Its boundaries connect with Khwah, Anjanri, Khazza, Miro Darah and Khammata. All traffics of Orakzai and Khyber Agencies go through this village when they are going to go to Khyber Agency or Orakzai Agency.

== Demographics ==
The population of the village, according to 2017 census was 5,442.
