= Agency (administrative division) =

Type of administrative division

Agencies are a type of administrative division:

- Agencies of British India, which grouped the autonomous princely states.
- Agencies of Pakistan, the main subdivisions of the Federally Administered Tribal Areas.
