= Turkistan Bhittani =

Taliban leader (died 2019)

Turkistan Bhittani or Turkestan Bettani (c. 1968 – 23 December 2019) was the militant leader of a pro-government Taliban faction based in the town of Tank in the Khyber-Pakhtunkhwa province of Pakistan. He is notable for his opposition to the Tehrik-i-Taliban Pakistan (TTP). Turkistan belongs to Bettani tribe (also spelled Bhittani).

== Background ==
During his teens, Bhittani joined in the anti-Soviet jihad in Afghanistan.

Later, Turkistan served in the Frontier Corps until his retirement in 1998. He then joined the Taliban in the Afghan Civil War and remained in 2001 to fight against US-led forces.

== Challenge to the TTP ==
Although at one time he was allied to Baitullah Mehsud, Turkistan Bhittani disapproved of Baitullah's violent attacks against Pakistani citizens and security forces. After he lost about 40 of his men in clashes with Baitullah's forces in 2008, Turkistan joined anti-TTP forces. With the implicit support of the Pakistani military, he allied himself with Qari Zainuddin Mehsud to openly challenge Baitullah. On 8 June 2009, Zainuddin and Turkistan held a jirga of Mehsud tribal elders during which Turkistan condemned Baitullah's methods and urged the elders to fight against the leader of the TTP if he did not end his attacks against civilians and begin negotiations with the government.

After Zainuddin's death on 23 June 2009, Turkistan proclaimed willingness to work with the Pakistani army and American forces to combat the TTP.
