= Mamozai =

Pashtun sub-tribe of the Orakzai

Mamuzai (Pashto: ماموزي) is a Pashtun sub-tribe of the Orakzai. Several Mamuzai live in Kohat, Peshawar, Islamabad, and in other areas in Pakistan. They undergo the Mishti-khel tribe of Orakzai. Mamozai also has sub-tribes.This is not to be confused with the region along the Pakistan border, Mamuzai. As of 2016, the returning of displaced individuals back to Mamuzai has been started.
