= Ghotak Eisa khel =

Village in Khyber Pakhtunkhwa, Pakistan

Coordinates: 33°40′10″N 70°46′10″E

Ghotak Eisa Khel is a village populated by Isa Khel Pashtuns in the Upper Orakzai Subdivision, now part of the Khyber Pakhtunkhwa province, Pakistan.

There is a primary school there.
