= Dande Darpakhel =

- Location within FATA Location within Khyber Pakhtunkhwa Location within Pakistan
- Coordinates: 32°59′18″N 70°3′5″E
- Country: Pakistan
- Territory: Federally Administered Tribal Areas
- District: North Waziristan
- Tehsil: Miran Shah

Population (2017)
  - Total: 0
- Time zone: UTC+5 (PST)

Dande Darpakhel is a village in the North Waziristan District of Bannu Division in the Khyber Pakhtunkhwa province of Pakistan. It is a suburb of Miranshah.

The village has been the target of a number of US drone strikes, one of which, in November 2013, killed the emir of Tehrik-i-Taliban Pakistan, Hakimullah Mehsud.

As of the 2017 Census of Pakistan, Dande Darpakhel has 0 inhabitants.

== Notable people ==
- Mohsin Dawar
