= Qari Hussain =

Prior top lieutenant of the Tehrik-i-Taliban Pakistan

Qari Hussain Ahmad Mehsud قارى حسین احمد
- Qari Hussain Mehsud
- Born: 6 December 1988; Kotkai, South Waziristan, Pakistan
- Died: 7 October 2010 (aged 21); North Waziristan, Pakistan
- Relatives: Hakimullah Mehsud (cousin, deceased)
- Military career
- Allegiance: Tehrik-i-Taliban Pakistan
- Service years: 2000s to October 2010
- Conflicts: War on terror; War in North-West Pakistan

Qari Hussain Ahmad Mehsud (Pashto/Urdu: قارى حسین احمد) (6 December 1988 – 7 October 2010) was a top lieutenant of the Tehrik-i-Taliban Pakistan (TTP) and the organizer of the group's suicide bombing squads. He was a cousin of Hakimullah Mehsud.

== Education ==
Hussain studied at the Jamia Farooqia seminary for four years.

== Operations ==
Hussain ran a training camp for suicide bombers in South Waziristan and had been active in violent acts against the Pakistani government. In May 2007 he directed a campaign of attacks in the Federally Administered Tribal Areas. The attacks included targeted killings of tribal elders and political agents, and attacks on police which resulted in many civilian deaths.

The violent nature of the attacks almost led to a split with Baitullah Mehsud, who at the time was amir of the TTP. On 1 June 2007, Mehsud captured 17 of Hussain's men and threatened to kill them in retaliation for a particularly brutal attack upon the residence of Pir Amiruddin Shah, the Political Agent of Khyber Agency, which killed guests and family members and had been undertaken without Mehsud's consent. However, Hussain was still a commander of Taliban forces.

Hussain was reported dead after his home was destroyed in January 2008, but in May 2008 appeared in front of Pakistani media to deny the reports. He was later reported killed in a 23 June 2009 airstrike at Makeen in South Waziristan, but then phoned reporters to prove he was alive. A few days after the airstrike, the Pakistan government announced a 10 million rupee reward for the killing or capture of Hussain, among other Tehrik-i-Taliban Pakistan commanders. On 2 November 2009 the reward was increased to 50 million rupees ($600,000)

A report by the Press Trust of India cited sources affirming that Hussain was killed on 14 January 2010, in the American drone airstrike in North Waziristan that reportedly killed Taliban leader Hakimullah Mehsud; however, Hussain apparently spoke with local media by telephone to deny Mehsud's death. The News International later reported that "top Pakistani and US sources" confirmed Hussain's death in the same drone strike against Mehsud. However, he once again appeared in an interview, speaking with Rediff.com in March 2010, and again denying Mehsud's death.

Hussain claimed responsibility for the 2010 Times Square car bomb attempt in an audiotape that was posted on the Tehreek-e-Taliban Pakistan News Channel on the website YouTube. Authorities in Pakistan believe that Faisal Shahzad, the Pakistani-American who admitted to planting the Times Square car bomb, was introduced to Hussain via Mohammad Rehan, and subsequently received explosives training before he returned to the United States.

On 15 October 2010, several reports came out indicating that Qari Hussain was killed in an American drone strike. Geo TV said that he and five Turks were killed on 2 October in the Dattakhel area. The Press Trust of India stated that he and three others were killed on 7 October outside of Miranshah in Jungle Khel. While Taliban spokesman Azam Tariq denied these reports were true, Qari Hussein never contacted media to confirm his survival. On 26 October, a senior Taliban operative as well as a counter terrorism expert contacted the Asia Times confirming that Hussain was killed on 7 October in the sub-district of Khushali in Mir Ali.

The TTP officially confirmed Hussain's death in December 2013.
