= Ghiljo Bazar =

- Location within FATA Location within Pakistan
- Coordinates: 33°38′1.45″N 70°51′13.72″E
- Country: Pakistan
- Territory: Federally Administered Tribal Areas
- Districts: Orakzai District
- Tehsil: Upper
- Time zone: UTC+5 (PST)

Ghiljo Bazar (Pashto: غلجو بازار), also called Ghaljo or Ghalju, is a town in the Khyber Pakhtunkhwa province of Pakistan. It is currently the summer administrative capital of Orakzai District, and is located in Upper Orakzai Tehsil. The winter administrative capital is Kalaya.

The town is named after the Pashtun tribe Ghilji. Town was badly affected during Military Operations, but due to the efforts of the security forces, the area was cleared, and normalcy restored.
