= Hakimullah Mehsud =

Second emir of Tehrik-i-Taliban Pakistan (2009-2013)

Hakimullah Mehsud حکیم اللہ محسود
- Mehsud in 2008

2nd Emir of Tehrik-i-Taliban Pakistan
- In office 22 August 2009 – 1 November 2013
- Preceded by: Baitullah Mehsud
- Succeeded by: Maulana Fazlullah

Personal details
- Born: Jamshed Mehsud c. 1978–1981 Kotkai region, South Waziristan, Pakistan
- Died: 1 November 2013 (aged between 31 and 34) Dande Darpa Khel, North Waziristan, Pakistan
- Cause of death: U.S. drone strike
- Relations: Qari Hussain (cousin, deceased)

Military service
- Allegiance: Tehrik-i-Taliban Pakistan
- Years of service: 2000s–2013
- Rank: Emir of Tehrik-e-Taliban Pakistan, Fedayeen al-Islam, and Jundallah
- Battles/wars: War on terror; War in North-West Pakistan

Hakimullah Mehsud (Note: Pashto: حکیم اللہ محسود) (born Jamshed Mehsud; (Note: Pashto: جمشید محسود) c. 1978–1981 − 1 November 2013), also known as Zulfiqar Mehsud, (Note: Pashto: ذو الفقار محسود) was a Pakistani militant who was the second emir of Tehrik-i-Taliban Pakistan from 2009 to 2013. It was confirmed by TTP that he was killed in a U.S. drone strike in Pakistan on 1 November 2013.

He had previously been deputy to commander Baitullah Mehsud and one of the leaders of the militant group Fedayeen al-Islam prior to the elder Mehsud's death in a CIA drone missile strike, and in TTP he had been commander in the Khyber, Kurram and Orakzai agencies of Pakistan. He was described as being born about 1979 and a cousin of Qari Hussain. He was known to be a young and aggressive field commander, who previously served as a driver and was very close to Baitullah Mehsud. He maintained ties to al-Qaeda, the Afghan Taliban and various Pakistani jihadist groups, such as Lashkar-e-Taiba, Lashkar-e-Jhangvi, and Jaish-e-Mohammed.

== Early life and family ==
Hakimullah was born as Jamshed Mehsud in the region of Kotkai in South Waziristan. According to the FBI's Most Wanted Terrorists list, Mehsud was born within the years ranging from 1978 to 1981. One birth date listed is 1 January 1980.

Mehsud was educated in a village madrassa, the Dar-ul-Uloom Shariah headed by Mufti Sarwar, in the Serwekai town of South Waziristan. Baitullah Mehsud also attended the same school but eventually dropped out. He also attended a secular school until Class 8.

According to a short seven-page autobiography he wrote, he was the eldest of nine siblings, having four brothers and four sisters, and was married twice, first to a fellow Mehsud and later to an Afridi from the Orakzai District, and in terms of religious activities he says he spent many months in a preaching mission with the Tablighi Jamaat.

Journalists who met him generally described him as hospitable and humorous in everyday life while Imtiaz Gul, head of the Center for Research and Security Studies, wrote in 2010 that "Hakimullah, more than six feet tall, radiates a certain charisma."

== Militant activities ==
=== Early activities ===
Jamshed Mehsud joined his clansman Baitullah in jihad, initially as his bodyguard and aide. He adopted the nom de guerre Zulfiqar, then later took the name Hakimullah, meaning one who has knowledge. He gained a reputation within the Taliban for his battle skills with the AK-47 and the Toyota pick-up truck. One Taliban member told a BBC correspondent that at the time Hakimullah's reputed skills were second only to Nek Mohammad.

In 2004, he was made a spokesman. He organised a series of raids against US military convoys between the summer of 2007 and the spring of 2008 that forced the closure of the Khyber Pass six times. In 2008, he was given command of the Orakzai, Khyber and Kurram districts.

=== Tehrik-e-Taliban leadership ===
Pakistani news channels reported on 8 August 2009 that Hakimullah Mehsud was killed after shooting erupted between his camp and that of Wali-ur-Rehman during a shura to determine the successor to the slain Baitullah Mehsud. Interior Minister Rehman Malik could not confirm the death only that the fighting had occurred. On 10 August, a man claiming to be Hakimullah Mehsud called a Reuters reporter to declare that he and Baitullah were still alive. While the reporter was certain that the call was authentic, Pakistani officials awaited voice analysis results and stated that intercepted phone calls led to the intelligence of Hakimullah's death. Wali-ur-Rehman telephoned a Reuters reporter to say that Hakimullah is alive, and would be calling soon, and that the first shura where the shooting supposedly occurred never took place.

On 22 August 2009, Hakimullah Mehsud was appointed unanimously as the new leader of the Tehrik-e-Taliban by a 42-member shura. Analysts cited by The Daily Times interpreted the appointment of the 28-year-old commander as a way to admit the death of Baitullah Mehsud although spokesmen for the group continued to vehemently deny his death, instead saying he was ill.

Hakimullah Mehsud appeared alongside suicide bomber Humam Khalil Abu-Mulal al-Balawi in an early January 2010 video that claimed responsibility for the Camp Chapman attack in retaliation for the death of Baitullah Mehsud.

In February 2011, Hakimullah was seen in the execution video of Sultan Emir Tarar, better known as Col Imam. Imam was kidnapped in March 2010.

== Rewards for capture ==
=== Pakistan bounty ===
On 2 November 2009 Pakistani authorities offered a Rs50 million (US$600,000) reward for information that lead to the capture or killing of Hakimullah Mehsud. They offered the same reward for similar information regarding Wali-ur-Rehman and Qari Hussain and smaller rewards for 16 other TTP militants.

=== United States bounty ===
On 1 September 2010 the United States added the militant leader to its list of Specially Designated Global Terrorists and the TTP to its list of Foreign Terrorist Organizations. The FBI posted a reward of $5 million for information leading to his capture.

== Political and religious views ==
Mehsud aimed to transform Pakistan into an Islamic state, in a video message released in July 2009 arguing that "We are not the enemies of Pakistan or the Pakistani nation. Instead we are the enemies of the kufr democratic system that has been forced on us. This system is unjust and despotic. This unethical and tyrannical setup is kufr system irrelevant to sharia" while in another video he said that "Taliban are not the enemies of Pakistan, its army or its administrators" adding that "if the administrators can implement the order of the Prophet (nizam-e-Mustafa) then we can address the hypocrites in India."

Under Mehsud's leadership the TTP attacks targeted what they considered to be hypocrites or munafaqeen, those who TTP declared to be spreading "discord" in Pakistan. This meant not only religious minorities like the Ahmedi and the Shia Muslims, but also the Barelvi sect of Sunni Islam, which made up more than half of the population of Pakistan, and is known for its Sufi activities. The TTP thus began "openly attacking Sufi shrines", Mehsud and TTP being of the rival Deobandi Sunni sect.

== Death ==
Reports initially indicated he was fatally wounded on 14 January 2010 by a U.S. drone attack although two videos released by the TTP in 2010 and 2011 proved that he survived the attack. Mehsud was reported by Pakistani intelligence to have been killed by a U.S. drone strike on 12 January 2012. However, the Pakistani Taliban denied the claim.

On 1 November 2013, a senior Taliban source confirmed that a US drone strike in Pakistan killed Mehsud in the village of Dande Darpa Khel in North Waziristan. Dande Darpa Khel was the site of the Dande Darpa Khel airstrike in 2008. The drone strike also killed two other militants, along with his uncle and cousin.

At the time of his death, he was living in a farmhouse worth $120 000, equipped with marble floors, green lawns and a tall minaret, where he used to grow apples, oranges, grapes and pomegranates.

== Notes ==
Military offices
Preceded by Baitullah Mehsud	Leader of Pakistani Taliban; 2009–2013	Succeeded by Maulana Fazlullah
