= Kalaya =

Kalaya: کلايه; کلایہ
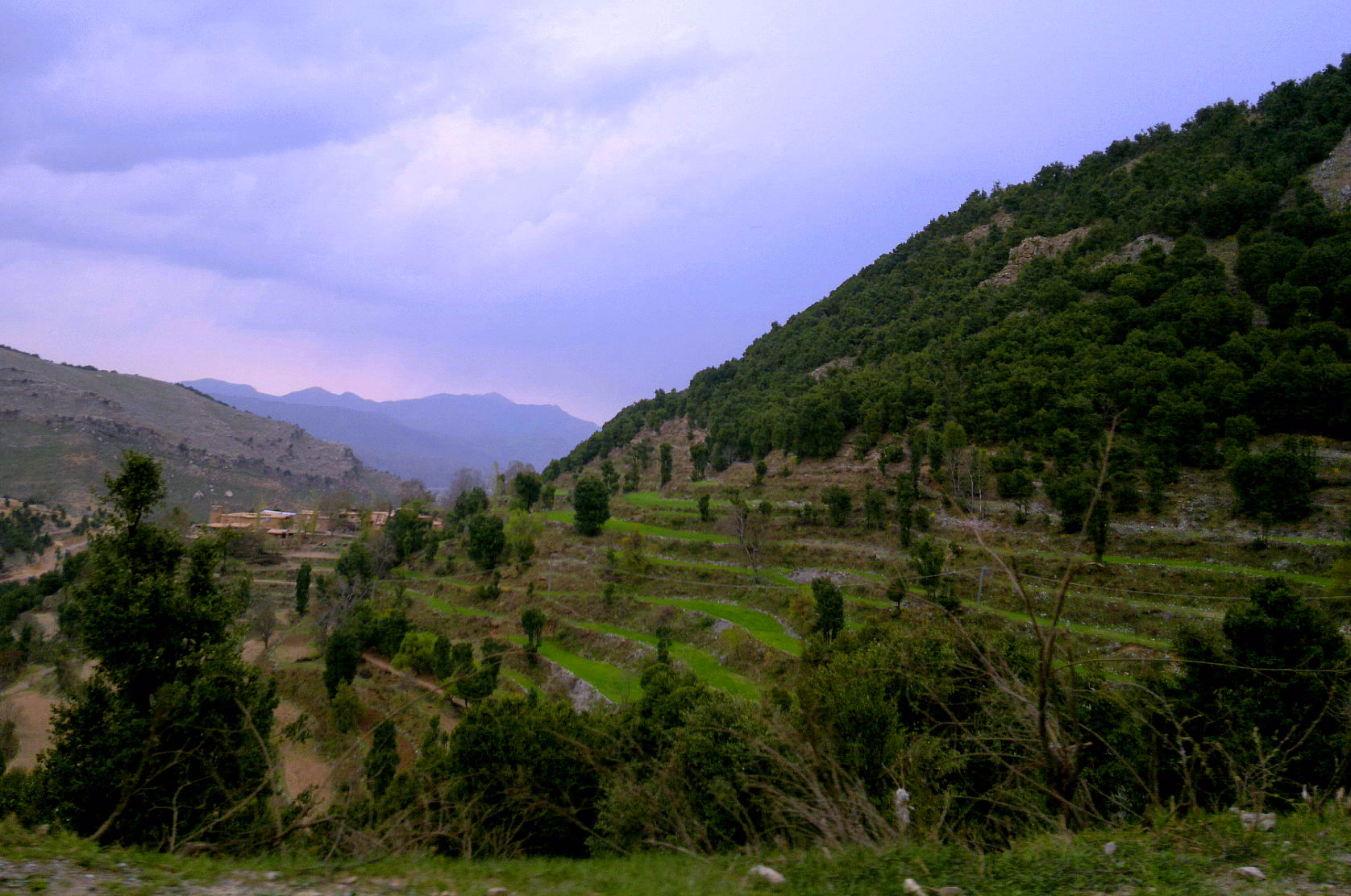

- Location within Khyber Pakhtunkhwa
- Coordinates: 33°44′44″N 70°57′35″E
- Country: Pakistan
- Province: Khyber Pakhtunkhwa
- District: Orakzai
- Tehsil: Lower Orakzai
- Elevation: 1,645 m (5,397 ft)
- Time zone: UTC+5 (PST)

Kalaya (Pashto: کلايه, Urdu: کلایہ) is a town in Orakzai District, in the Khyber Pakhtunkhwa province (formerly part of the Federally Administered Tribal Areas) of Pakistan. It is located at 33°44'44"N 70°57'35"E with an altitude of 1645 meters. It is currently the winter administrative capital of Orakzai District, and is located in Lower Orakzai Tehsil. The summer administrative capital is Ghiljo Bazar. The town is populated by ethnic Pashtuns who speak the Pashto language and follow Sunni Islam and Shia Islam.
