= Maulvi Omar =

Maulvi Said Muhammad, better known as Maulvi Omar or Maulvi Umar, is a senior militant commander who was captured by the Pakistani security forces in August 2009. Omar, a spokesman for the internationally designated terrorist group Tehrik-e-Taliban Pakistan (TTP), was a close associate of Baitullah Mehsud, the first chief of TTP. His capture was seen as a major blow to the Taliban in Pakistan.

Omar, a high-profile figure who often contacted journalists to claim responsibility for the various terrorist attacks by the Taliban, was captured in 2009 while travelling with two associates in Mohmand Agency of Pakistan's tribal areas, near the border with Afghanistan. In 2008 the Pakistan Government had erroneously claimed that he had been killed in a bombing of Bajaur Agency. Describing his arrest, Maj Fazal Ur Rehman of the Pakistan army said "A very, very important militant has been arrested".

The arrest of Omar, who was reportedly captured due to the help of local anti-Taliban militia, was seen as important in weakening the Taliban who were already in some disarray following the death of Baitullah Mehsud. Omar was also seen as a key source of information on the operation of militants in the border areas with Afghanistan.

Following his arrest, Omar confirmed the death of his former chief Baitullah Mehsud; prior to his capture he had claimed that Mehsud was still alive.
