= Lower Orakzai Tehsil =

Lower Orakzai Tehsil تحصیل اورکزئی زیریں ښکته اورکزي تحصیل
- Tehsil
- Country: Pakistan
- Region: Khyber Pakhtunkhwa
- District: Orakzai District

Government
  - Nazim: Mohammad Tariq (PRHP)

Population (2017)
  - Total: 107,397
- Time zone: UTC+5 (PST)

Lower Orakzai Tehsil is a subdivision located in Orakzai District, Khyber Pakhtunkhwa, Pakistan. The population is 107,397 according to the 2017 census.

== See also ==
- Kalaya
- List of tehsils of Khyber Pakhtunkhwa
