= Upper Orakzai Tehsil =

Upper Orakzai Tehsil تحصیل اورکزئی بالا پورتنۍ اورکزي تحصیل
- Tehsil
- Country: Pakistan
- Region: Khyber Pakhtunkhwa
- District: Orakzai District
- Headquarters: Ghiljo Bazar

Government
  - Nazim: Mohammad Tahir (JUI(F))

Population (2017)
  - Total: 63,872
- Time zone: UTC+5 (PST)

Upper Orakzai Tehsil is a subdivision located in Orakzai District, Khyber Pakhtunkhwa, Pakistan. The population is 63,872 according to the 2017 census.

== See also ==
- List of tehsils of Khyber Pakhtunkhwa
