= Ahmadzai (Wazir clan) =

Pashtun tribe

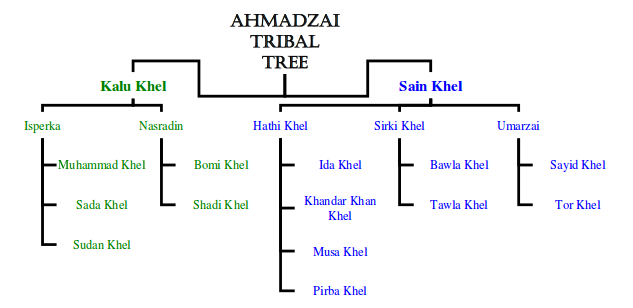
Subtribes of the Ahmadzai Pashtun tribe.

Aḥmadzai (Pashto: احمدزی, "descendants of Aḥmad"; also spelled Ahmedzai) is a Sunni Muslim Pashtun tribe found in South Waziristan and Bannu District in the Federally Administered Tribal Areas of Pakistan. They are a clan of the larger Wazir tribe.

== Origins ==
The Ahmedzai, whose name is translated as "descendants of Ahmad", are a distinct tribe from the similarly named community of Afghanistan. They form one of the two major branches of the Wazir tribe, with the other being the Utmanzai of North Waziristan Agency, Pakistan. The common ancestor of the Ahmadzai and Utmanzai is Wazir, who is also ancestor to the Mehsuds who have since taken a distinct and divergent path. Through Wazir, the tribes trace their origins to Karlanri and thence to the founder of the Pashtun lineage, Qais Abdur Rashid. Ahmad was a son of Wazir.

The tribe are Sunni Muslims of the Hanafi sect, although not particularly strict in observance of their religious beliefs. It is possible that some have come under the influence of the Deobandi sect, followers of which have in recent years become active in areas where the tribe lives.

== Location ==
The Ahmadzai were originally settled in the Birmal Valley area of modern-day Afghanistan. Today, they inhabit Pakistan and are primarily a pastoral community that earn a living from the rearing of sheep. Many Ahmadzai migrate between areas according to the seasons. The majority are found in Bannu District and around one-third live in the South Waziristan Agency, a Federally Administered Tribal Area of Pakistan. The North and South Waziristan agencies together form this region, which derives its name from the Wazir supra-tribe.

Unlike the Utmanzai, the Ahmadzai generally co-exist peacefully with their Mehsud cousins. Many head men from the two tribes are connected by marriage.

== Notable people ==
- Muhammad Iqbal Wazir
- Ayesha Gulalai Wazir
- Maria Toorpakai Wazir
- Durmirjan wazir
- Aneela Iqbal Wazir
- Javed Iqbal Wazir
- Farzana Iqbal Wazir
- Rabia Iqbal Wazir
- peshawer khan Wazir
