= Orakzai =

Pashtun tribe

اورکزۍ

Languages
- Pashto

Religion
- Islam (Majority Sunni, Minority Shia)

Related ethnic groups
- Afridi · Khattak · Mahsud · Wazir and other Karlani Pashtun tribes

The Orakzai (Pashto: وركزۍ) are a Pashtun tribe native to the Orakzai Agency and parts of Kurram and Khyber Agencies in Pakistan's Khyber Pakhtunkhwa province. Additionally, a sub-tribe of the Orakzai resides in Afghanistan's Maidan Wardak Province. The Orakzai people predominantly speak Pashto.

== Location ==
The Orakzai belong to the Tirah valley located in Khyber Pakhtunkhwa. The Orakzais inhabit the mountains to the north-west and north-east of Kohat district, bounded on the north and east by the Afridis or Khyber Agency, on the south by the Bangash or Miranzai Valley and on the west by the Bangash country and the Safed Koh mountains.

== History ==
=== Origins ===
The Orakzai tribes take their name, which literally means the lost son (Wrak Zoi), he was an exiled Prince of Iran named Sikandar Shah from the Qajar Dynasty with Oghuz Turkic Origin, he got lost and was adopted by karalan, and after many adventures he married and settled in Tirah. One branch, the Ali Khel, has been traced to Swat, whence they were expelled by the other inhabitants and it is not improbable that the whole tribe consists of refugee clans of the surrounding races. They cultivate a good deal of the Khanki and Kurmana valleys in the winter, but in the hot months retire to the heights of Tirah, of which they occupy the southern half called the Mastura Valley.

=== Mughal era ===
The Orakzais served in the Mughal army. The Bhopal State of India was established by Dost Muhammad Khan, an Orakzai commander in the Mughal army. His descendants, the Nawabs of Bhopal, were of Orakzai ancestry.

==== British era ====
The government of British India estimated that the tribe had 28,000 fighting men. They were the object of various British military expeditions, notably in 1855, 1868, 1869, 1891 and the Tirah campaign of 1897.

== Notable Orakzai ==
- Dost Mohammad Khan, founder and King of Bhopal
- Jalal Khan Orakzai, Afghan war hero who defended his town and from a force of 80,000 invaders
- Ali Jan Orakzai, former Governor of Khyber Pakhtunkhwa
- Munir Khan Orakzai, Parliamentary leader of FATA
- Abdul Jalil Orakzai, War Hero of the Indo-Pakistani war of 1965

== See also ==
- Orakzai Scouts
