= Orakzai District =

Orakzai District ضلع اورکزئی اورکزي ولسوالۍ
- District of Khyber Pakhtunkhwa
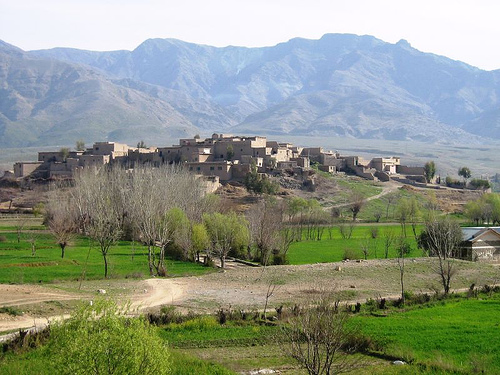
- Village in Orakzai district

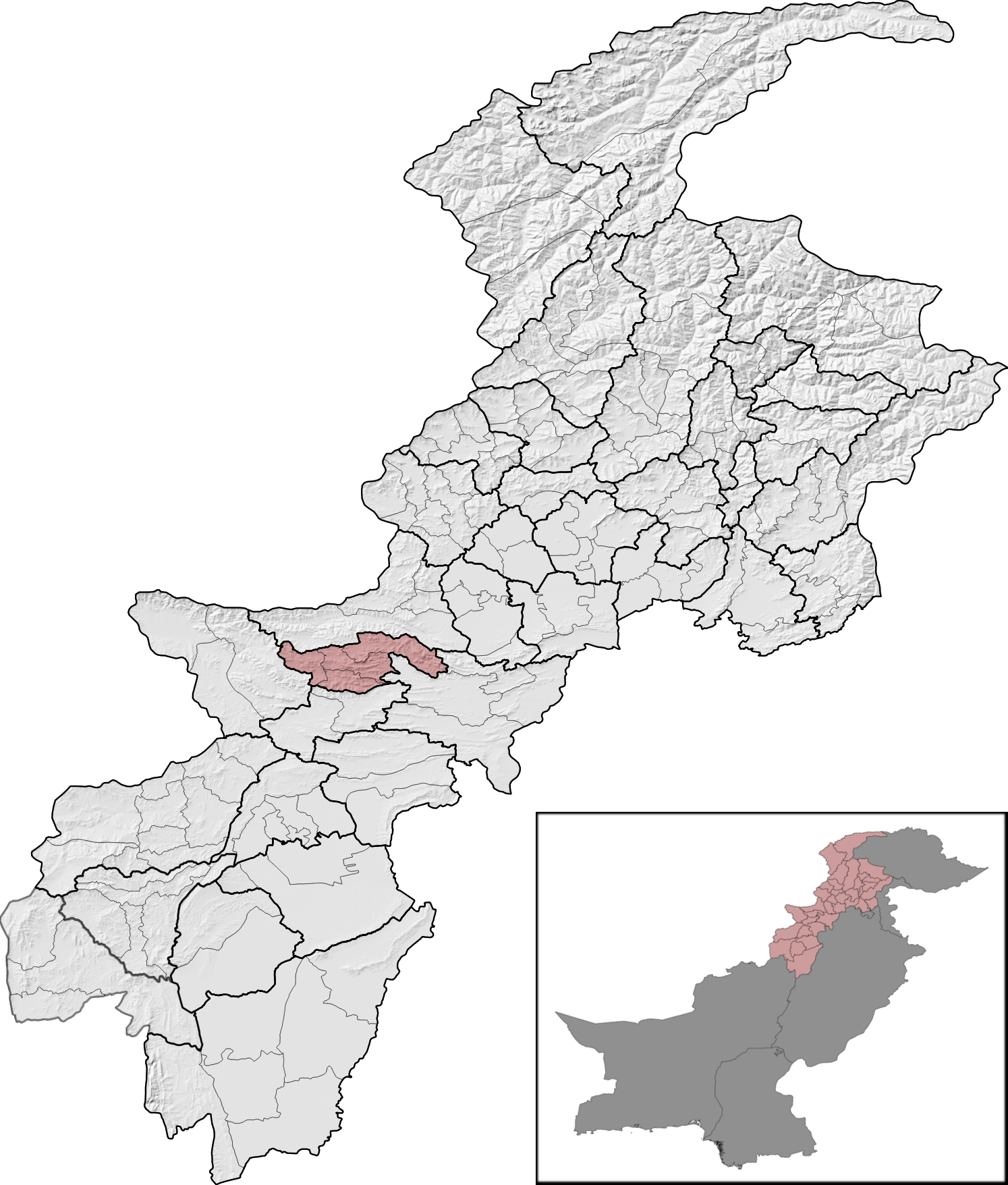
- Orakzai District (red) in Khyber Pakhtunkhwa
- Coordinates: 33°43′50.2″N 71°00′54.2″E
- Country: Pakistan
- Province: Khyber Pakhtunkhwa
- Division: Kohat
- Established: 30 November 1973 (as an agency of Federally Administered Tribal Areas)
- Headquarters: Ghiljo Bazar (Upper Orakzai); Kalaya (Lower Orakzai)
- Number of Tehsils: 4

Government
  - Type: District Administration
  - Deputy Commissioner: Mr Muhammad Khalid (BPS-18 PAS)
  - District Police Officer: Nazir Ahmed Khan Tanoli (BPS-18 PSP)
  - District Health Officer: N/A

Area
  - District of Khyber Pakhtunkhwa: 1,538 km^{2} (594 sq mi)

Population (2023)
  - District of Khyber Pakhtunkhwa: 387,561
  - Density: 252.0/km^{2} (652.7/sq mi)
  - Urban: 0
  - Rural: 387,561

Literacy
  - Literacy rate: Total: 33.57%; Male: 50.70%; Female: 14.97%
- Time zone: UTC+5 (PST)
- Main language(s): Pashto
- Website: orakzai.kp.gov.pk

Orakzai District (Pashto: اورکزي ولسوالۍ, Urdu: ضلع اورکزئی) is a district in Kohat Division of Khyber Pakhtunkhwa, Pakistan. Before 1973, it was part of the Frontier Region of Kohat. Up until 2018, it was an agency within the erstwhile Federally Administered Tribal Areas. However, with the merger of the FATA with KPK, it attained the status of a district.

== History ==
The Orakzai tribe derives its name, Wrak Zoy ("the lost son" ), in a literal sense, from a romantic legend, Sikandar Shah. This ancestral figure, a prince hailing from Iran, was subjected to exile. After a series of adventures, he married and ruled in the region of Tirah. The tribal area now forming Orakzai District was previously included in the Frontier Region of Kohat district. This status persisted until the 30th of November, 1973.

Due to a long-standing demand of the Orakzais, the then President of Pakistan announced the creation of Orakzai Agency on 3rd of November, 1973 and was formally inaugurated on 1st of December, 1973. Before it gained the status of an agency, this area was administered as a Frontier Region of the Kohat district by the Deputy Commissioner of Kohat.

Then Prime Minister Zulfiqar Ali Bhutto announced the creation of the agency at a grand tribal jirga in Samana, and it began functioning on 1 December 1973. Before this, the Orakzai tribes were part of the Kohat and Hangu Frontier region. The headquarters of the agency are at Hangu District, but tehsil-level headquarters are in Kalaya and Ghiljo Bazar.

== Geography ==
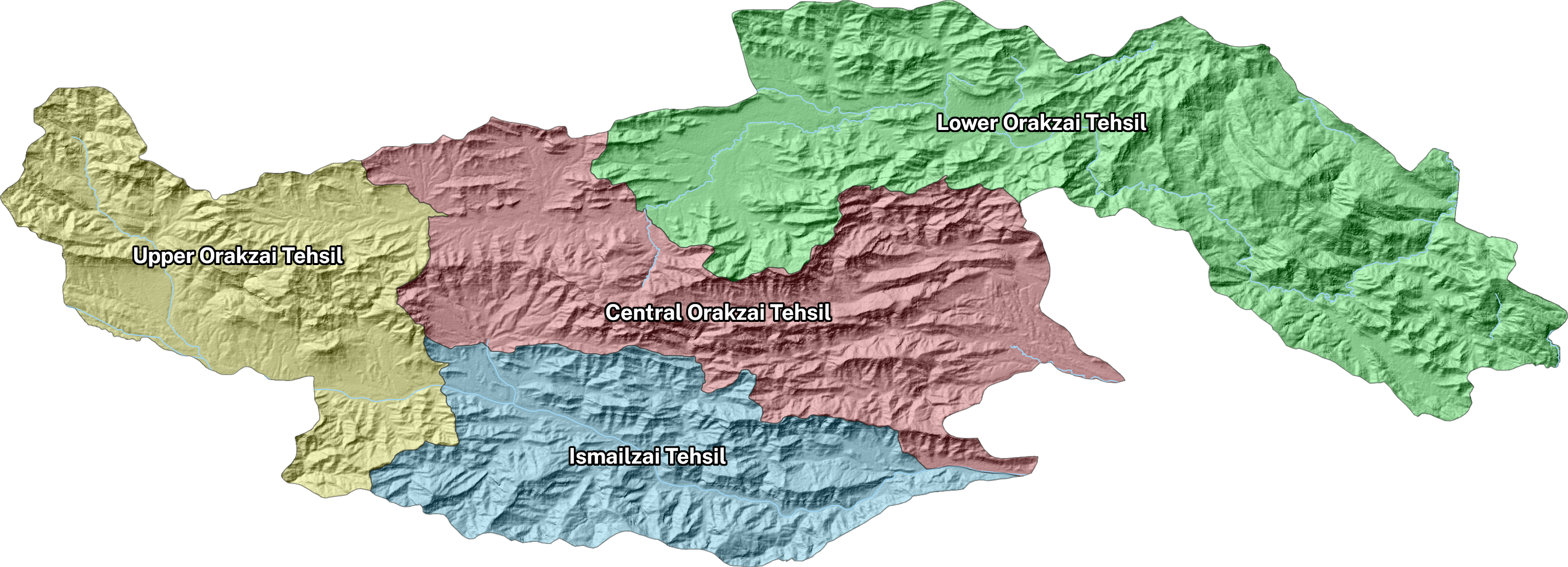
Tehsils of Orakzai District

The Orakzai District consists of two sub-divisions: Upper sub-division and Lower sub-division. The Upper sub-division comprises two Tehsils, Upper Tehsil and Ismailzai Tehsil, and the Lower sub-division also has two Tehsils, Lower Tehsil and Central Tehsil. It is bordered in the north by Khyber District, in the east by FR Kohat, in the south by the Kohat and Hangu districts, and in the west by Kurram District. The total area of the district is 1,538 square kilometers.

The valley is flanked by mountain ranges 1,800 metres (6,000 ft) to 2,100 metres (7,000 ft) high. Among the seven tribal agencies, Orakzai Agency is the second smallest in area after Bajaur Agency. It is bounded by Kurram Agency in the west, Khyber in the north, Kohat District on the south and Peshawar in the east. The whole of the territory of Orakzai agency is a mountainous tract dissected by numerous dry water courses, especially in the southwest part of the agency. The two major streams are the Mastura River and Khanki Toi River, both of which originate from the hills to west and run eastwards.

Orakzai Agency is a hilly region with a fertile valley. The elevation of the hills varies from over 10,000 feet (3,000 m) in the west and to less than 2,030 metres (6,650 ft) in east. Generally, the elevation of the plain varies from 1,600 metres (5,200 ft) to 1,700 metres (5,500 ft) above sea level. Important peaks are Sangla (1,928 metres (6,325 ft)) and Chara Kandaco (1,720 metres (5,643 ft)).

== Demographics ==
Historical population
Year	Pop.	±% p.a.
1961	209,616	—
1972	283,557	+2.78%
1981	358,751	+2.65%
1998	225,441	−2.70%
2017	254,303	+0.64%
2023	387,561	+7.27%

As of the 2023 census, Orakzai district has 52,104 households and a population of 387,561. The district has a sex ratio of 112.14 males to 100 females and a literacy rate of 33.57%: 50.70% for males and 14.97% for females. 138,265 (35.68% of the surveyed population) are under 10 years of age. The entire population lives in rural areas. 812 (0.21%) people in the district were from religious minorities, mainly Christians. Pashto was the predominant language, spoken by 99.87% of the population.

== Tourism ==
Nanawar Cave is situated in Mani Khel Dara in the Orakzai Tribal District. This approximately 200-meter-long cave features two entrances and serves as a natural habitat for thousands of bats and spiders. The cave's origins trace back thousands of years, though its exact formation remains a subject of debate among experts. One theory suggests that ancient volcanic activity created the cave when lava erupted in the area, trapping a bubble that eventually formed the cavern. Another geological interpretation proposes that Nanawar is a limestone cave that developed along an underground water channel, with water flowing beneath the surface during summer months. From a historical perspective, some historians note that the graves found in the surrounding area do not appear to be Muslim in origin. This observation has led to speculation that the cave may have served as a meditation retreat during the Kanishka period around 127 CE, when Buddhism flourished in the region. Contrary to local myths suggesting the cave extends indefinitely into unexplored depths, the cave does have a definite end point. The passage gradually narrows toward its terminus, creating an increasingly suffocating atmosphere due to diminishing oxygen levels, which naturally limits further exploration.

== Administration ==
Orakzai District is currently subdivided into four Tehsils.

Tehsil	Name (Urdu) (Pashto)	Area (km²)	Pop. (2023)	Density (ppl/km²) (2023)	Literacy rate (2023)	Union Councils
Central Orakzai Tehsil	(Urdu: تحصیل اورکزئی وسطی)(Pashto: منځني اورکزي تحصیل)	399	92,819	232.63	34.79%	
Ismail Zai Tehsil	(Urdu: تحصیل اسماعیل زئی)(Pashto: اسماعیلزي تحصیل)	275	39,328	143.01	34.20%	
Lower Orakzai Tehsil	(Urdu: تحصیل اورکزئی زیریں)(Pashto: ښکته اورکزي تحصیل)	565	125,944	222.91	41.86%	
Upper Orakzai Tehsil	(Urdu: تحصیل اورکزئی بالا)(Pashto: پورتنۍ اورکزي تحصیل)	299	129,470	433.01	23.98%	

=== Upper Orakzai ===
Upper Orakzai is a National Assembly constituency in the Orakzai District.

Some of main areas of Upper Orakzai include:

- Ghiljo Bazar
- Sama Bazar
- Ghotak Eisa khel
- Mishti mela

Upper Orakzai is the Sub-Division of Orakzai District. The main office are in Ghiljo Bazar. Upper Orakzai includes four big sections: Ali khel Mola Khel Mamozai Ali Sherzai Eisa khel Ahkhel Shikhan

=== Lower Orakzai ===
The Lower Orakzai agency is a subdivision of the Orakzai region. The headquarters is in Kalaya, also known as Kalaya Headquarters, and is a fairly populated area of the Orakzai agency. The main sections include: Sepoy, Bar Muhammad Khel, Mani Khel, Feroz Khel, Utman Khel, Bezoti, and Stori Khel.

==== Sepoy ====
Sepoy has two main sub-tribes (Taps): Mitha Khan Khel and Lakhkri Khel. Within these tribes, there are smaller mini-tribes, each located in separate areas. The mini-tribes in Mitha Khan Khel include: Zanzeer Khel, Umbra Khel, Arunkhel, Shekhi Nawasi, Usai, and Baba Nawasi.

The Zanzeer Khel, Gul Hasan Nawasi, some of the Shekhi Nawasi, and the Hamsayas of Bar Muhammad Khel and Karegran are located in Paloosi village, which is a notable settlement in the region.

A famous Malik from Sepoy was Syed Jafar of the Zanzeer Khel, who was known for his visionary mindset and bright intellect. He was the son of Muhammad Jafar, who, in turn, was the son of Ali Jafar. Ali Jafar was the son of Dil Sher, who was the brother of Lal Sher. Both Lal Sher and Dil Sher were sons of Mirza.

The main big villages in this area include Paloosi, Khura Baba Nawasi, and Wazir Garhi.

=== Provincial Assembly ===
Member of Provincial Assembly	Party affiliation	Constituency	Year
Syed Ghazi Ghazan Jamal Orakzai	Pakistan Tehreek-e-Insaf	PK-94 Orakzai	2019

== Education ==
According to Pakistan District Education Rankings 2017 published by Alif Ailaan, Orakzai District ranks 125th in Pakistan in terms of primary school infrastructure while it ranks 132nd in Pakistan for middle school infrastructure.

In terms of education score, Orakzai District stands at 103rd number in National Ranking. The retention score is 30.03 whereas the gender parity score is 63.14 from the available data.

Lack of government schools and provision of teachers are among the main issues reported by the residents of Orakzai District using the Taleem Do! App.

== Climate ==
Orakzai Agency is characterized by extreme cold winters and mild summers. December, January and February are the coldest months and snow falls in these months. Summers are mild and the maximum temperature does not go above 30 degrees Celsius. Surrounding mountains are covered by dense thick forests, which produce a cooling effect in summer. Due to the geographical position of Orakzai and its thick forest cover, it rains throughout the year. In winter, the precipitation is snowfall over the surrounding mountains and the valley. There is no rain gauge, but rainfall is estimated to be around 910 millimetres (36 in) per year.

== Talibanization and Army offensive ==
The Talibanization of the area began in 2006 during a period of intense sectarian violence. Initially, the Taliban were welcomed by locals who were unaware of their true intentions. The militants integrated themselves into local communities, and once they had established sufficient numbers, they began imposing their authority on the population. Local residents found themselves powerless and were compelled to comply with Taliban demands.

In August 2013, the Taliban launched a devastating attack on Kalaya village, kidnapping 230 Orakzai residents, including elderly people, young men, women, and children. The militants tortured many captives and killed 80 innocent civilians. One week later, survivors were freed during a Pakistan Army operation against the Taliban, though many sustained injuries. The Taliban completely destroyed Kalaya village and devastated the local Orakzai economy. Residents fled to various locations within Pakistan and abroad to escape the violence. Following their defeat in Waziristan, Taliban forces retreated to Orakzai Agency, where intense violence soon erupted. The Pakistan Army launched an unannounced offensive, the Orakzai and Kurram operation, strategically cutting off Taliban escape routes: from Kurram Agency to the west, Kohat to the south, and Bara to the east. With local support, the army forced the Taliban to abandon the lower subdivision, inflicting heavy casualties on militant forces in the upper subdivision and significantly diminishing their regional influence.

This military campaign resulted in a mass displacement of internally displaced persons to Kohat and Hangu, where they received shelter in refugee camps. While the security situation has improved considerably in the Lower Orakzai division, military operations against Taliban militants continue in the Central and Upper subdivisions.

== See also ==
- Wachpal
- Orakzai Scouts
