= Baitullah Mehsud =

Founder and first leader of the Tehrik-i-Taliban Pakistan (1970–2009)

- بیت اللہ محسود

1st Emir of the Tehrik-i-Taliban Pakistan
- In office December 2007 – 5 August 2009
- Preceded by: Position established
- Succeeded by: Hakimullah Mehsud

Personal details
- Born: c. 1970 Bannu District, Khyber Pakhtunkhwa, Pakistan
- Died: 5 August 2009 (aged 38–39) South Waziristan, Khyber Paktunkhwa, Pakistan
- Cause of death: U.S. drone strike

Military service
- Allegiance: Tehrik-i-Taliban Pakistan
- Years of service: 2000s–2009
- Rank: Emir of Tehrik-e-Taliban Pakistan
- Battles/wars: War on terror; War in North-West Pakistan

Baitullah Mehsud (Note: Pashto: بیت اللہ محسود) (c. 1970 – 5 August 2009) was a Pakistani militant. He was one of the founders and first chief of the internationally designated terrorist group Tehrik-e-Taliban Pakistan (TTP) in Waziristan. He formed the TTP from an alliance of about five militant groups in December 2007. He is thought by U.S. military analysts to have commanded up to 5,000 fighters and to have been behind numerous terrorist attacks in Pakistan including the assassination of Benazir Bhutto which he and others have denied.

Disagreement exists over the exact date of the militant's death. Pakistani security officials initially announced that Baitullah Mehsud and his wife were killed on 5 August 2009 in a U.S. Central Intelligence Agency drone attack in the Zangar area of South Waziristan. Interior Minister Rehman Malik delayed giving official confirmation and asked for patience and an announcement by Inter Services Public Relations (ISPR) or other agencies. Kafayat Ullah, a TTP source, also announced the death of the militant in the strike, as did his deputy Faqir Mohammed. Later TTP head Hakimullah Mehsud denied previous TTP announcements and said Mehsud was in good health. Major General Athar Abbas, the ISPR spokesman, and Robert Gibbs of the White House said at the time that his death could not be confirmed. U.S. National Security Adviser James L. Jones also claimed that there was "pretty conclusive" evidence that proved Baitullah Mehsud had been killed and that he was 90% sure of it. On 23 August 2009, Hakimullah Mehsud and Wali-ur-Rehman telephoned the BBC to say that Baitullah Mehsud had died on 23 August 2009 due to injuries sustained during the 5 August attack. On 30 September 2009, the BBC received a video that showed the body of Mehsud.

Syed Saleem Shahzad, writing in the Asia Times, described Baitullah Mehsud as a physically small man, with diabetes.

== Background ==
=== Early life ===
Baitullah Mehsud was born in 1970 in the Landi Dhok village in the Bannu District of Khyber Pakhtunkhwa province of Pakistan, which lies some distance from the Mehsud tribe's base in the South Waziristan Agency, his native village there being Dwatoi in the Ladha Subdivision, his father having moved to Bannu for work. An ethnic Pashtun, he hailed from the Broomi Khel side of the Shabi Khel sub-clan of the Mehsud tribe, and was one of five brothers.

He avoided media attention and refused to be photographed in adherence with his religious beliefs. Even if it's generally said that he did not attend schooling or religious madrassa, other sources say he did get early education in Bannu and also got further education in Punjab, while during his student days he was affiliated with the Jamiat Tulaba-e-Islam (JTI), the student wing of Maulana Fazlur Rahman’s religious party Jamiat Ulema-e-Islam (F) (JUI-F).

He emerged as a major tribal leader soon after the 2004 death of Nek Mohammad. In a ceremony attended by five leading Taliban commanders, including Mullah Dadullah, Baitullah was appointed Mullah Omar's governor of the Mehsud area.

=== Leadership dispute ===
After Naik Muhammad's death, Abdullah Mehsud and Baitullah Mehsud both vied for dominance of the Pakistani Taliban. When Abdullah died in a raid by Pakistani security forces and later his successor perished in a bomb explosion. Qari Zain and other members of Abdullah's faction suspected that Baitullah played a role in the attacks. The rivalry continued after Zainuddin obtained leadership of Abdullah's group.

==== Relationship with Abdullah Mehsud ====
Abdullah Mehsud, a Taliban leader who was among the first captives set free from Guantanamo, has been described as Baitullah's brother. Other sources have asserted that they were clansmen or merely associates.Islam Online reports that Baitullah suspected that Abdullah was a double agent.

=== 2005 ceasefire agreement ===
Mehsud entered into a ceasefire with Pakistani authorities on 8 February 2005. During the meeting at Sara rogha, the Pakistani military agreed to withdraw its troops from areas under Baitullah's control. The removal did not include the paramilitary Frontier Corps, consisting mostly of fellow Pashtuns. In exchange, Baitullah's followers would not attack government officials, impede development projects or allow foreign militants to operate within their territory. Mehsud was offered US$20 million for his cooperation in the ceasefire. He declined the money and told Pakistani authorities that they should use the pay-out to "compensate families who had suffered during the military operation". The ceasefire agreement ended in July 2005 when after accusing the government of reneging on the deal, Baitullah resumed attacks on security forces.

=== 2006–2007 ===
By 2006, Baitullah Mehsud's growing influence in South Waziristan led terrorism analysts to label him as "South Waziristan's Unofficial Amir". On the other hand, his rival Maulvi Nazir had been endorsed as the Amir of South Waziristan by Mullah Omar in 2006.

An official in Frontier Constabulary described his army:

Baitullah's lashkar (army) is very organised. He has divided it into various units and assigned particular tasks to each unit. One of the units been tasked to kill people who are pro-government and pro-US or who support the US occupation of Afghanistan. The last person to be killed was Malik Arsallah Khan, chief of the Khuniakhel Wazir tribe, who was killed on 22 February in Wana (in South Waziristan).

In June 2006 Taliban-aligned Waziri tribes began negotiating another ceasefire with Pakistani forces.

In a January 2007 interview with the BBC Urdu Service, Baitullah extolled the virtues of jihad against foreigners and advocated taking the fight to the U.S. and to Britain.

After the siege of Lal Masjid in July Baitullah turned his forces against the Pakistani state.

In December 2007, Mehsud was declared the first leader of the Tehrik-i-Taliban Pakistan.

=== 2008 ceasefire ===
In February 2008, Mehsud announced that he had agreed to another ceasefire with the government of Pakistan although the Pakistani military claimed that operations against Mehsud's forces continued. The New York Times, however, reported that anonymous high-level officials in the Pakistani government confirmed the deal. In April Baitullah circulated a pamphlet that ordered his followers not to undertake any attacks inside Pakistan due to ongoing peace talks.

In July 2008, Baitullah issued a statement that threatened to take action against the Khyber Pakhtunkhwa government if it did not step down within five days. The NWFP parliamentary leaders promptly refused.

=== Rumors of death in September 2008 ===
Various news media sources reported the death of Baitullah Mehsud on 30 September 2008 at the age of 34 due to kidney failure. Many of his close associates, including his aide, his doctor and a Taliban spokesman, vehemently denied the rumors. According to the spokesman, Mehsud was "fit and well." Mehsud's doctor also said he had spoken with him after the rumors of his death. The rumors proved to be false.

=== Second marriage ===
Mehsud entered a second marriage in November 2008. Mehsud's first wife bore his four daughters and he may have hoped his second wife, "the daughter of an influential cleric," Ikramuddin Mehsud, would bear him a son.

=== Leadership dispute continues ===
In February 2009, senior Taliban leaders Baitullah Mehsud, Hafiz Gul Bahadur and Maulvi Nazir put aside their differences in an effort to refocus against a common enemy. Nazir had previously feuded with Baitullah for his sheltering of Uzbek militants whom Nazir had fought to evict from South Waziristan. As a result of the February agreement, Maulvi Nazir ended support for Qari Zainuddin Mehsud, who the Daily Times described as the "self-appointed successor of ... Abdullah Mehsud." Zainuddin's group then allied with a group led by another militant, Turkestan Bhittani, they in turn made an alliance with the MI of Pakistan Army, which provide them safe heavens in Tank, Dera Ismail Khan and Abbottabad regions of Khyber Pakhtunkhwa. This alliance proved to be a major blow to BaitUllah Mehsud and his allies, limiting their influence in the bordering regions of his strong base South Waziristan, that is, Tank and Dera Ismail Khan. Qari Zainuddin Mehsud and Turkestan Bhittani groups were involved in many illegal activities in those regions, such as kidnappings, extortion and killings.

On 27 March 2009, Pakistan's Daily Times reported that Baitullah Mehsud's group was engaged in a dispute with Qari Zainuddin's group for control of South Waziristan. Both groups had distributed pamphlets leveling accusations against the other groups' leader. Qari Zainuddin stated that Baitullah's group was not practicing jihad because Islam forbids suicide attacks. Baitullah's pamphlet claimed that the slain Abdullah had been a government puppet and Qari Zainuddin was a traitor to Islam and to the Mehsud tribe.

The rivalry culminated on 23 June 2009, when a gunman shot and killed Zainuddin in Dera Ismail Khan. The gunman had served as one of his bodyguards and after the incident was suspected to be Baitullah's agent.

=== Bounties ===
On 28 June 2009 the Pakistani government announced a reward of Rs.50,000,000 for information that leads to the capture, dead or alive, of Baitullah. The bounty coincided with a previous offer from the United States, which offered $5,000,000.

=== Death in August 2009 ===
On the night of 5 August 2009, while he was staying with his second wife at his father-in-law's house in Zangara, a U.S. drone attacked the premises. According to former CIA director Leon Panetta, he was observed on the roof of the house and identified by the distinctive hat he wore. According to The Times, it may have been his desire to father a son that ultimately led to his demise.

Two of his followers, Maulana Meraj and Hakimullah Mehsud, denied the report the following day, dismissing it as "rumors" intended to negatively impact the Taliban's spread of jihad. They suggested that Baitullah had gone into hiding and isolation as a part of a strategy. Hakimullah added that meetings of Taliban officials in Dir and surroundings are proceeding as usual "to make worth of their abilities and to discuss other plans which he called 'war game plans'." These reports were followed by several telephone conversations between AP reporters with Qari Hussain, Maulvi Omar and Hakimullah Mehsud to deny Baitullah's death and to claim he had been ill, perhaps gravely, for several months or had been "busy on the battlefield." Hakimullah indicated that soon a videotape would be released as a proof of his statements.

After his capture on 18 August, Maulvi Omar retracted his previous statements and confirmed that Baitullah had indeed perished in the missile strike. On 20 August, U.S. President Barack Obama stated "We took out [Baitullah] Mehsud" in a radio address. On 25 August, both Hakimullah Mehsud and Wali-ur-Rehman confirmed to BBC and AP correspondents that Baitullah had perished on 23 August from injuries sustained in the missile strike.

The attack was part of the U.S. Central Intelligence Agency's (CIA) campaign using unmanned aerial vehicles in the region by the agency's Special Activities Division. U.S. missile strikes targeting Mehsud territory in South Waziristan became more common after June 2009 when Pakistan, while having been publicly critical of the missile strikes, declared a military offensive against Mehsud.

After Baitullah Mehsud was reported to have been killed by missiles fired from an American Predator drone the Asia Times reported that Tohir Yo'ldosh had been Baitullah's ideological mentor, that Tohir had put 2,500 experienced fighters at his disposal, and that Baitullah lived with the Uzbek, who became his biggest ideological inspiration.

== Notable incidents attributed to Baitullah Mehsud ==
A September 2007 report from the United Nations attributed almost 80% of suicide bombings in Afghanistan to Baitullah. Pakistani officials traced an estimated 90% of suicide and militant attacks within Pakistan throughout the 2007–2009 period to his South Waziristan stronghold.

=== September 2007 Rawalpindi bombings ===
Preliminary investigations concerning the September 2007 bombings in Rawalpindi note that Mehsud is the primary suspect behind the attacks. An 18 December 2005 report stated that Baitullah Mehsud, Abdullah Mehsud and Yaldeshev were the subject of a man-hunt. Authorities said they believed that the militants were short of ammunition and would be captured soon.

=== Benazir Bhutto assassination ===
On 28 December 2007 the Pakistan government claimed that it had strong evidence regarding Baitullah Mehsud as the man behind the assassination of former Prime Minister Benazir Bhutto on 27 December 2007. The Pakistani government released a transcript it asserted was from a conversation between Baitullah Mehsud and Maulvi Sahib (literally "Mr. Cleric"). According to the transcript Maulvi Sahib claimed credit for the attack, Baitullah Mehsud asked who carried it out, and was told, "There were Saeed, the second was Badarwala Bilal and Ikramullah Mehsud was also there."

The translation released from Agence France Presse differed slightly from the translation from the Associated Press. According to the transcripts Baitullah Mehsud says he is at, "Anwar Shah's house", in Makeen or Makin. The Agence France Presse transcript identifies Makeen as a town in South Waziristan.

Subsequently, both Agence France Presse and NDTV released an official denial by Mehsud's spokesman in which he said that Mehsud had no involvement in the attack, that the transcript was "a drama", that it would have been "impossible" for militants to penetrate the security cordon around Bhutto, and that her death was a "tragedy" which had left Mehsud "shocked". Mehsud's spokesman was quoted as saying: "I strongly deny it. Tribal people have their own customs. We don't strike women."

In an address to the nation on 2 January 2008, Pakistani President Pervez Musharraf said that he believed Maulana Fazlullah and Baitullah Mehsud were prime suspects in the assassination of Bhutto.

On 18 January 2008, The Washington Post reported that the CIA has concluded that Mehsud was behind the Bhutto assassination. "Offering the most definitive public assessment by a U.S. intelligence official, Michael V. Hayden said Bhutto was killed by fighters allied with Mehsud, a tribal leader in northwestern Pakistan, with support from al-Qaeda's terrorist network." U.S. President George W. Bush then placed Mr. Mehsud on "a classified list of militant leaders whom the C.I.A. and American commandos were authorized to capture or kill."

=== March 2009 Lahore police academy attack ===
In telephone interviews with news media Mehsud claimed responsibility for 30 March 2009 attack on the police training academy in Lahore. He told the BBC that the attack was in retaliation for continued missile strikes from American drones for which the Pakistani government shared responsibility. In the same interview Mehsud claimed two other attacks: a 25 March attack on an Islamabad police station and a 30 March suicide attack on a military convoy near Bannu.

=== April 2009 Binghamton shooting claim ===
Although the FBI later completely refuted that he had any involvement in the incident, Mehsud claimed responsibility for the shooting in Binghamton, New York, on 13 April 2009. Thirteen people were killed in the shooting, after which the attacker committed suicide. In a telephone interview, Mehsud reportedly said: "I accept responsibility. They were my men. I gave them orders in reaction to US drone attacks." Mehsud made this claim despite the fact that the gunman in the shooting was alone and of Vietnamese nationality and had stated other motives in his last letter.

== Notes ==
Military offices
Preceded by Nek Muhammad	Leader of Pakistani Taliban; 2004–2009	Succeeded by Hakimullah Mehsud
