= Akhtar =

- Gender: Feminine and Masculine
- Language: Punjabi, Pashto, Persian

Origin
- Origin: Persian and Pashto, Punjabi
- Meaning: "Star"

Other names
- Alternative spelling: Akhter

Akhtar, Akhter, or Aktar (Persian: اختر, Pashto: اختر) is a unisex given name and surname of Persian origin. Notable people with the name include:

== Given name ==
=== Akhtar ===
- Akhtar Abbas, Pakistani politician
- Akhtar Ali (1939–2021), Indian tennis player
- Akhtar Ayub (born 1987), Pakistani cricketer
- Akhtar Hussain Badshah, Pakistani politician
- Akhtar Baloch (1967–2022), Pakistani writer, journalist, and historian
- Akhtar Hossain Bhuiyan (born 1959), Bangladeshi civil servant
- Akhtar Bibi, Pakistani politician
- Akhtar Chaudhry (born 1961), Pakistani-Norwegian politician
- Akhtar Hayat Gandapur, Pakistani police officer
- Akhtar Hassan Khan Gorchani (born 1958), Pakistani diplomat, politician, and intelligence official
- Akhtar Habib, Bangladeshi Navy officer
- Akhtar Hossain (1945–2026), Bangladeshi writer
- Akhtar Husain (1912–1992), Pakistani scholar, journalist, and lexicographer
- Akhtar Hussain (field hockey) (1926–1987), Pakistani field hockey player
- Akhtar Hussain (lawyer) (born 1946), Pakistani lawyer, judge, and politician
- Akhtar Hussain (sarangi player) (born 1959), Pakistani sarangi player
- Akhtar Hussain (umpire) (died 1973), Pakistani cricket umpire
- Akhtar Imam (1917–2009), Bangladeshi educationist, feminist, and social activist
- Akhtar ul Iman (1915–1996), Indian Urdu poet and screenwriter
- Akhtarul Iman (born 1964), Indian politician
- Akhtar-ul-Islam (born 1947), Pakistani field hockey player
- Akhtar Jadoon, Pakistani politician
- Akhtar Ali G. Kazi (1944–2010), Pakistani politician
- Akhtar Khan, British journalist and radio presenter
- Akhtar Khan (politician), Pakistani politician
- Akhtar Hameed Khan (1914–1999), Pakistani development practitioner and social scientist
- Akhtar Hussain Khan (musician) (1900–1974), Pakistani vocalist and musician
- Akhtar Raza Khan (1943–2018), Indian Islamic scholar, cleric, and mufti
- Akhtar Hussain Langove, Pakistani politician
- Akhtar Mahal, Mughal consort
- Akhtar Hussain Malik (1910s–1969), general of the Pakistan Army
- Akhtar Mansur (1959–2016), Afghan militant
- Akhtar Mengal (born 1962), Pakistani politician
- Akhtar Mirza, Indian screenwriter and director
- Akhtar Mohiuddin (born 1956), Pakistani football player and coach
- Akhtar Mohiuddin (writer) (1928–2001), Indian novelist, playwright, and short story writer
- Akhtar Naraghi, Canadian poet, writer, and scholar
- Akhtar Nawab, American chef and restaurateur
- Akhtar Mohammad Osmani (died 2006), Afghan Taliban leader
- Akhtar Payami (1931–2013), Indian-Pakistani journalist, poet, and writer
- Akhtar Purvez, Indian-American author, physician, and medical researcher
- Akhtar Abdur Rahman (1924–1988), Pakistani Army general
- Akhtar Rasool (born 1954), Pakistani field hockey player
- Akhtar Sadmani (1934–2003), Bangladeshi singer
- Akhtar Raza Saleemi (born 1974), Pakistani poet, novelist, writer, critic, and editor
- Akhtar Sarfraz (1976–2019), Pakistani cricketer and coach
- Akhtar Shah (born 2002), Pakistani cricketer
- Akhtarul Islam Shahin, Indian politician
- Akhtar Sheerani (1905–1948), Pakistani poet
- Akhtar Hameed Siddiqui (1947–2017), Bangladeshi politician
- Akhtar Usman (born 1969), Pakistani poet, critic, columnist, and writer
- Akhtar Ali Vario (1933–2008), Pakistani politician
- Akhtarul Wasey (born 1951), Indian scholar and academician
- Akhtar Chanal Zahri (born 1954), Pakistani folk singer

=== Akhter ===
- Akhter-ul Alam (died 2010), Bangladeshi journalist and diplomat
- Akhter Hossen (born 1997), Bangladeshi politician and activist
- Akhter Husain (1902–1983), Pakistani politician
- Akhter Hussain (professor), Bangladeshi academic
- Akhter Mia (1920–1984), Bangladesh politician

=== Aktar ===
- Aktar Islam (born 1980), British-Bangladeshi restaurateur

== Surname ==
=== Akhtar ===
- Adeel Akhtar (born 1980), British actor
- Ayad Akhtar (born 1970), American playwright, novelist, and screenwriter
- Farhan Akhtar (born 1974), Indian film director
- Gulraiz Akhtar (1943–2021), Pakistani field hockey player
- Jan Nisar Akhtar (1914–1976), Indian poet
- Javed Akhtar (born 1945), Indian film writer and poet
- Kabir Akhtar (born 1975), American director and editor
- Saghir Akhtar, Qatari chemist
- Saleem Akhtar (1930–2004), Pakistani former cricketer
- Shamshad Akhtar (1954–2025), Pakistani economist, diplomat, banker, and politician
- Shoaib Akhtar (born 1975), Pakistani cricketer
- Zoya Akhtar (born 1972), Indian film director

=== Akhter ===
- Doli Akhter (born 1986), Bangladeshi Olympic swimmer
- Mahfuza Akhter (born 1967), Bangladeshi football administrator
- Moin Akhter (1950–2011), Pakistani television actor
- Salma Akhter (born 1991), Bangladeshi singer

=== Aktar ===
- Cengiz Aktar (born 1955), Turkish scientist
- Mohammad Aktar (born 1962), Afghan wrestler

== Compound names with the element Akhtar ==
- Akhtar-ud-Din (Star of the Religion)
  - Akhter Uddin Mia (1920–1984), Bangladeshi politician
  - Akhtaruddin Ahmad (born 1930), Bangladeshi lawyer and government minister
  - A. F. Muhammad Akhtaruddin (born 1968), Bangladeshi cricket umpire
- Akhtar-ul-Iman (Star of Faith)
  - Akhtar ul Iman (1915–1996), Indian poet and screenwriter
  - Akhtarul Iman (born 1964), Indian politician
- Akhtar-ul-Islam (Star of Islam)
  - Akhtarul Islam (born 1947), Pakistani field hockey player
  - Akhtar-ul-Islam (born 1947), Pakistani field hockey player
  - Akhtarul Islam Shahin (born 1979), Indian politician
- Akhtarul Wasey (born 1951), Indian academician
- Akhtaruzzaman, multiple people

== See also ==
- Akhtar, a Persian-language periodical founded in Istanbul, 1876
- Akhtaruzzaman, a derived name
