= American drone strikes in Pakistan =

2004–2018 US drone strikes in Northwest Pakistan

- Part of the Insurgency in Khyber Pakhtunkhwa, the War in Afghanistan and the war on terror
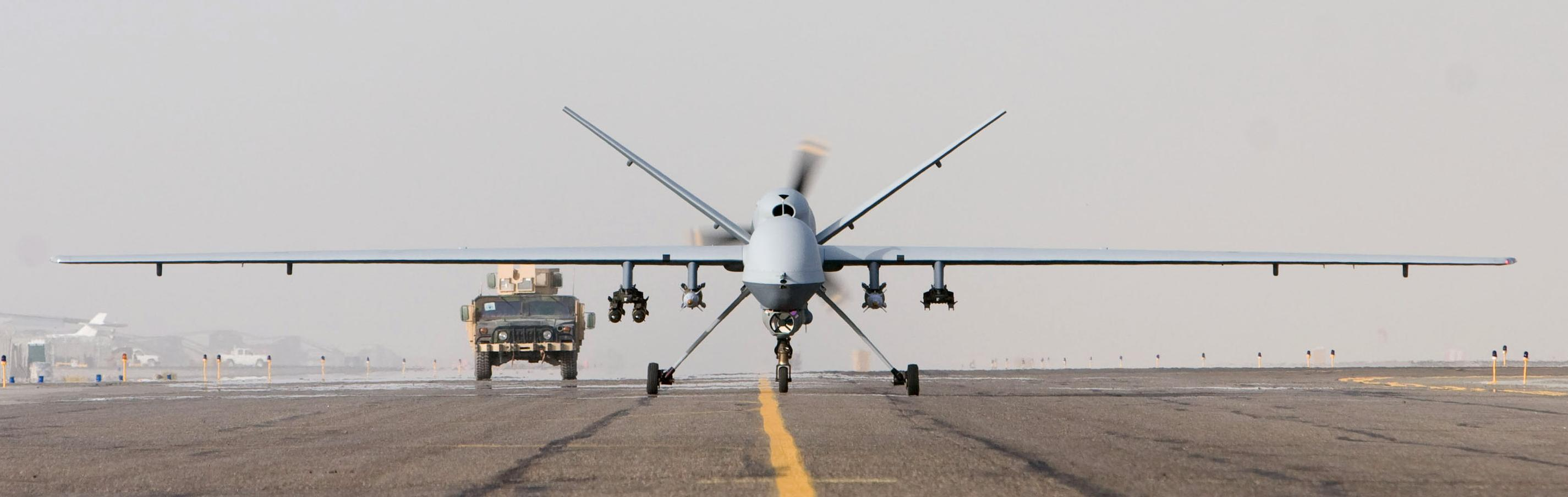
- An MQ-9 Reaper landing in Afghanistan.
Date	18 June 2004 – 4 July 2018
Location	Federal Tribal Areas, Pakistan
Result	American operational success: Most recent drone strike launched in July 2018.; 81 high-level insurgent leaders and thousands of low-level insurgents killed; Deaths of Afghan Taliban head Akhtar Mansour, and successive TTP heads Baitullah Mehsud and Hakimullah Mehsud.; Deaths of hundreds of Pakistani civilians.; Destruction of numerous insurgent camps and safe havens; 5 drone strikes in 2017, followed by one in 2018 and none in 2019; Substantial reduction in insurgent activity by 2017.; 430 drone strikes confirmed

Belligerents
United States: USAF; CIA; Supported by: United Kingdom	Taliban; Tehrik-i-Taliban Pakistan; TNSM; Haqqani network; al-Qaeda; Lashkar-e-Islam; Foreign Mujahideen; Uzbek Islamic Movement; Turkistan Islamic Party; Islamic State affiliates

Commanders and leaders
(United States) United States; President; Donald Trump (2017–18); Barack Obama (2009–17); George W. Bush (2004–09); (United Kingdom) United Kingdom; Prime Minister; Theresa May (2016–2019); David Cameron (2010–16); Gordon Brown (2007–10); Tony Blair (2004–07)	Tehrik-i-Taliban; Maulana Fazlullah †; Hakimullah Mehsud †; Baitullah Mehsud †; Nek Muhammad Wazir †; Abdullah Mehsud †; Hafiz Gul Bahadur; Adnan Rashid; Nasib Zada †; Qari Hussain †; Maulvi Nazir †; Wali-ur-Rehman †; Khan Saeed Mehsud Sajna †; Mangal Bagh †; Omar Khalid Khorasani †; Faqir Mohammed (POW); Sufi Muhammad (POW); al-Qaeda; Ayman al-Zawahiri †; Osama bin Laden †; Muhsin Musa Matwalli Atwah †; Abu Laith al-Libi †; Khalid Habib †; Mohammad Hasan Khalil al-Hakim †; Fahid Mohammed Ally Msalam †; Sheikh Ahmed Salim Swedan †; Saad bin Laden †; Abdullah Said al Libi †; Saeed al-Masri †; Ahmed Mohammed Hamed Ali †; Sheikh Fateh †; Ilyas Kashmiri †; Atiyah Abd al-Rahman †; Abu Yahya al-Libi †; Hassan Ghul †; Abu-Zaid al Kuwaiti †; Farman Ali Shinwari †; Said Bahaji †; Adnan Gulshair el Shukrijumah †; Ahmad Farooq †; Adam Yahiye Gadahn †; Matiur Rehman †; Hamza bin Laden †; Abu Khalil al-Madani †; Asim Umar †; Abu Muhsin al-Masri †; Muhammad Naeem Noor Khan †; (Islamic State) ISIL; Abu Bakr al-Baghdadi †; Hafiz Saeed Khan †; Abdul Rahim Muslim Dost (2014–2015); Usman Ghazi †; (Islamic State) IMU Group; Usman Ghazi †; Abu Usman Adil †; Tohir Yuldashev †; Najmiddin Jalolov †

Strength
c. 30 UAVs MQ-9 Reaper	Unknown

Casualties and losses
9 (CIA personnel)	c. 2,000–3,500 militants killed
- Civilian deaths: 158–965; Long War Journal: 158 civilians killed; New America Foundation: 245–303 civilians killed; Bureau of Investigative Journalism: 424–969 civilians killed

Between 2004 and 2018, the United States government attacked thousands of targets in northwest Pakistan using unmanned aerial vehicles (drones) operated by the United States Air Force under the operational control of the Central Intelligence Agency's Special Activities Division during the war on terror. Most of these attacks were on targets in the Federally Administered Tribal Areas (now part of the Khyber Pakhtunkhwa province) along the Afghan border in northwest Pakistan.

These strikes began during the administration of United States President George W. Bush, and increased substantially under his successor Barack Obama. Some in the media referred to the attacks as a "drone war". The George W. Bush administration officially denied the extent of its policy; in May 2013, the Obama administration acknowledged for the first time that four US citizens had been killed in the strikes.

Pakistan's former Prime Minister, Nawaz Sharif, had repeatedly demanded an end to the strikes, stating: "The use of drones is not only a continual violation of our territorial integrity but also detrimental to our resolve and efforts at eliminating terrorism from our country". However, despite the public opposition of Pakistani officials, multiple former Prime Ministers gave covert permission to the United States to carry out these attacks. The Peshawar High Court has ruled that the attacks are illegal, inhumane, violate the Universal Declaration of Human Rights and constitute a war crime. In December 2013, the National Assembly of Pakistan unanimously approved a resolution against US drone strikes in Pakistan, calling them a violation of "the charter of the United Nations, international laws and humanitarian norms." The Obama administration disagreed, contending that the attacks did not violate international law and that the method of attack was precise and effective.

Notable targets of the strikes included Baitullah Mehsud, the leader of the Pakistani Taliban (killed in a strike in South Waziristan on 5 August 2009), Hakimullah Mehsud, Mehsud's successor (killed in a strike on 1 November 2013), and Akhtar Mansour, leader of the Afghan Taliban (killed in a strike on 21 May 2016 in Ahmad Wal, Pakistan). The operations in Pakistan were closely tied to a related drone campaign in Afghanistan, along the same border area. These strikes have killed 3,798–5,059 militants and 161–473 civilians. Among the militant deaths are hundreds of high-level leaders of the Afghan Taliban, the Pakistani Taliban, the Islamic State, Al-Qaeda, the Haqqani Network, and other organizations, with 70 Taliban leaders killed in one ten-day period of May 2017 alone.

== Overview ==
=== Early U.S. drone strikes and Pakistan's cooperation (2004–2008) ===
For at least some of the initial drone strikes, in 2004 and 2005, the U.S. operated with the approval and cooperation of Pakistan's ISI. Former Pakistani President Pervez Musharraf told The New Yorker in 2014 that he allowed the CIA to fly drones within Pakistan and that in exchange the U.S. supplied helicopters and night-vision equipment to the Pakistanis. However, Musharraf said Pakistan gave permission "only on a few occasions, when a target was absolutely isolated and (there was) no chance of collateral damage". He said the strikes were discussed "at the military (and) intelligence level" and cleared only if "there was no time for our own (special operations task force) and military to act. That was ... maybe two or three times only". He added: "You couldn't delay action. These ups and downs kept going ... it was a very fluid situation, a vicious enemy ... mountains, inaccessible areas." Musharraf wanted the drones to operate under Pakistani control, but the U.S. wouldn't allow it. On 4 October 2008 The Washington Post reported that there was a secret deal between the U.S. and Pakistan allowing these drone attacks. U.S. President George W. Bush reportedly accelerated the drone strikes during the final year of his presidency. General David Petraeus was told by Pakistan in November 2008 that these strikes were unhelpful.

=== Expansion of drone strikes under Obama administration (2009–2010) ===
Bush's successor, President Obama, broadened attacks to include targets against groups considered to be seeking to destabilize Pakistani civilian government; the attacks of 14 and 16 February 2009 were against training camps run by Baitullah Mehsud. On 4 March 2009 The Washington Times reported that the drones were targeting Baitullah Mehsud. A list of the high-ranking victims of the drones was provided to Pakistan in 2009. Obama was reported in March 2009 as considering expanding these strikes to include Balochistan. On 25 February 2009 Leon Panetta, the director of the CIA, indicated the strikes will continue. Leon Panetta reiterated on 19 May 2009 that the US intended to continue the drone attacks.

The Associated Press (AP) noted that Barack Obama apparently expanded the scope and increased the aggressiveness of the drone campaign against militants in Pakistan after taking office. According to the news agency, the US increased strikes against the Pakistani Taliban, which earned favor from the Pakistani government, resulting in increased cooperation from Pakistani intelligence services. Also, the Obama administration toned down the US government's public rhetoric against Islamic terrorism, garnering better cooperation from other Islamic governments. Furthermore, with the drawdown of the war in Iraq, more drones, support personnel, and intelligence assets became available for the campaigns in Afghanistan and Pakistan. Since Obama took office, according to the AP, the number of drones operated by the CIA over Afghanistan and Pakistan doubled.

==== Strategic rationale ====
According to some current and former counterterrorism officials, the Obama administration's increase in the use of drone strikes is an unintended consequence of the president's executive orders banning secret CIA detention centers and his attempt to close the Guantanamo Bay prison camp, and capturing prisoners has become a "less viable option". Senator Saxby Chambliss of Georgia alleged that, "Their policy is to take out high-value targets, versus capturing high-value targets ... They are not going to advertise that, but that's what they are doing." Obama's aides argued that it is often impossible to capture targets in the tribal areas of Pakistan and Yemen, and that other targets are in foreign custody thanks to American tips. Obama's counter-terrorism adviser, John O. Brennan, said that, "The purpose of these actions is to mitigate threats to U.S. persons' lives", and continued, "It is the option of last recourse. So the president, and I think all of us here, don't like the fact that people have to die. And so he wants to make sure that we go through a rigorous checklist: The infeasibility of capture, the certainty of the intelligence base, the imminence of the threat, all of these things." In response to the concerns about the number of killings, Jeh C. Johnson stated, "We have to be vigilant to avoid a no-quarter, or take-no-prisoners policy."

==== Impact on militants ====
US officials stated in March 2009 that the Predator strikes had killed nine of al Qaeda's 20 top commanders. The officials added that many top Taliban and al Qaeda leaders, as a result of the strikes, had fled to Quetta or even further to Karachi. US military reports asserted that al Qaeda is being slowly but systematically routed because of these attacks, and that they have served to sow the seeds of uncertainty and discord among their ranks. They also claimed that the drone attacks have addled and confused the Taliban, and have led them to turn against each other. In July 2009 it was reported that (according to US officials) Osama bin Laden's son Saad bin Laden was believed to have been killed in a drone attack earlier in the year.

==== Further expansion and broadening of strikes ====
In December 2009 expansion of the drone attacks was authorized by Barack Obama to parallel the decision to send 30,000 more American troops to Afghanistan. Senior US officials are reportedly pushing for extending the strikes into Quetta in Balochistan against the Quetta Shura. Speaking at a news conference in Islamabad on 7 January 2010 Senators John McCain and Joe Lieberman stated the drone attacks were effective and would continue but stated that US would make greater efforts to prevent collateral damage. In an effort to strengthen trust with Pakistan "US sharing drone surveillance data with Pakistan", said Mike Mullen. US defence budget for 2011 asked for a 75% increase in funds to enhance the drone operations.

=== Pakistani role in drone operations and response ===
According to leaked diplomatic cables, Pakistan's Army Chief Ashfaq Parvez Kayani not only tacitly agreed to the drone flights, but in 2008 requested that Americans increase them. According to The Daily Telegraph, Pakistani intelligence has agreed to secretly provide information to the United States on Mehsud's and his militants' whereabouts while publicly the Pakistani government continued to condemn the attacks.

In May 2009 it was reported that the US was sharing drone intelligence with Pakistan. US Senator Dianne Feinstein said in February 2009: "As I understand it, these are flown out of a Pakistani base." Pakistani foreign minister Shah Mehmood Qureshi denied that this was true.

The British newspaper The Times stated on 18 February 2009 that the CIA was using Pakistan's Shamsi Airfield, 190 miles (310 km) southwest of Quetta and 30 miles (48 km) from the Afghan border, as its base for drone operations. Safar Khan, a journalist based in the area near Shamsi, told the Times, "We can see the planes flying from the base. The area around the base is a high-security zone and no one is allowed there." Top US officials confirmed to Fox News Channel that Shamsi Airfield had been used by the CIA to launch the drones since 2002. Pakistan allegedly allowed the drones to operate from Shamsi Airfield in Pakistan until 21 April 2011.

According to unnamed US government officials, beginning in early 2011 the US would fax notifications to Pakistan's Inter-Services Intelligence agency (ISI) detailing the dates and general areas of future drone attack operations. The ISI would send a return fax acknowledging receipt, but not approving the operation. Nevertheless, it appeared that Pakistan would clear the airspace over the area and on the dates designated in the US fax. After the May 2011 raid that killed bin Laden, the ISI ceased acknowledging the US faxes, but Pakistani authorities have appeared to continue clearing the airspace in the areas where US drones are operating. According to an unnamed Pakistani government official, the Pakistan government believes that the US sends the faxes primarily to support legal justification for the drone attacks.

==== Condemnation and protests of strikes ====
On 28 April 2009, Pakistan's consul general to the US, Aqil Nadeem, asked the US to hand over control of its drones in Pakistan to his government. "Do we want to lose the war on terror or do we want to keep those weapons classified? If the American government insists on our true cooperation, then they should also be helping us in fighting those terrorists", said Said Nadeem. Pakistan President Zardari has also requested that Pakistan be given control over the drones, but this has been rejected by the US who are worried that Pakistanis will leak information about targets to militants. In December 2009 Pakistan's Defence minister Ahmad Mukhtar acknowledged that Americans were using Shamsi Airfield but stated that Pakistan was not satisfied with payments for using the facility.

Pakistan has repeatedly protested these attacks as an infringement of its sovereignty and because civilian deaths have also resulted, including women and children, which has further angered the Pakistani government and people. Pakistan's government publicly condemned various attacks. Pakistan's Interior Minister Rehman Malik said, "drone missiles cause collateral damage. A few militants are killed, but the majority of victims are innocent citizens." The drone attacks continued, despite repeated requests made by ex-Pakistani President Asif Ali Zardari through different channels.

=== Operational and policy changes in U.S. drone program (2011–2013) ===
On 28 April 2011, U.S. President Barack Obama appointed General David Petraeus as director of the CIA overseeing the drone attacks. According to Pakistani and American officials this could further inflame relations between the two nations. Drone strikes were halted in November 2011 after NATO forces killed 24 Pakistani soldiers in the Salala incident. Shamsi Airfield was evacuated of Americans and taken over by the Pakistanis December 2011. On 9 December 2011, Pakistan's Army Chief Ashfaq Parvez Kayani issued a directive to shoot down US drones. A senior Pakistani military official said, "Any object entering into our air space, including U.S. drones, will be treated as hostile and be shot down." The incident prompted an approximately two-month stop to the drone strikes, which resumed on 10 January 2012.

The daily Indian newspaper The Hindu reported that Pakistan reached a secret agreement with United States to readmit the attacks of guided airplanes on its soil. According to a high western official linked with the negotiations, the pact was signed by ISI chief Lieutenant General Shuja Ahmad Pasha, and the director of the Central Intelligence Agency general David Petraeus during a meeting in Qatar January 2012. According to The Hindu, Lieutenant General Pasha also agreed to enlarge the CIA presence in Shahbaz air base, near the city of Abbottabad, where Al-Qaeda chief Osama bin Laden was killed in May 2011.

US President Obama affirmed on 30 January 2012 that the US was conducting drone strikes in Pakistan. He stressed that civilian casualties in the strikes were low. In May 2012, the US began stepping up drone attacks after talks at the NATO summit in Chicago did not lead to the progress it desired regarding Pakistan's continued closure of its Afghan borders to the alliance's supply convoys.

In May 2013, an International Crisis Group report concluded that drone strikes were an "ineffective" way of combating militants in Pakistan. A week later, the Pakistani Taliban withdrew an offer of peace talks after a drone strike killed their deputy leader. The Pakistani Taliban's threat to "teach a lesson" to the US and Pakistan, after the aggressive American rejection of peace talks, resulted in the shooting of 10 foreign mountain climbers, as well as a mis-targeted bomb killing fourteen civilians, including four children, instead of security forces in Peshawar at the end of June 2013. In early June, it was reported that the CIA did not even know who it was killing in some drone strikes. A few days later, the freshly elected Pakistani Prime Minister, Nawaz Sharif, called for an end to drone strikes in his country. Not long after, a US strike killed another nine people, an act that prompted Sharif to summon the US chargé d'affaires in protest and to demand, again, an "immediate halt" to the Anglo-American drone program. On 1 November 2013, the US killed Hakimullah Mehsud.

=== Reduction and reevaluation of drone strikes (2013–2015) ===
In July 2013, it was reported that the US had drastically scaled back drone attacks in order to appease the Pakistani military, which was under growing pressure to move to end American "airspace violations". The CIA was instructed to be more "cautious" and limit the drone strikes to high-value targets, to cut down on so-called signature strikes (attacks that target a group of militants based purely on their behavior). Pakistani military officials had earlier stated that these drone attacks cannot continue at the tempo they are going at, and that civilian casualties in these strikes are spawning more militants.

In 2013, the sustained and growing criticism of his drone policy forced Obama to announce stricter conditions on executing drone strikes abroad, including an unspoken plan to partly shift the program from the CIA to the ostensibly more accountable Pentagon. In anticipation of his speech, Obama instructed Attorney General Eric Holder to divulge that four U.S. citizens had been killed by drones since 2009, and that only one of those men had been intentionally targeted.

Following Obama's announcement, the United Nations' drone investigator, British lawyer Ben Emmerson, made clear his expectation of a "significant reduction" in the number of strikes over the 18 months to follow, although the period immediately after Obama's speech was "business as usual". Six months later, the CIA was still carrying out the "vast majority" of drone strikes. However, no attack occurred since December 2013, and the drone war was described as "basically over" in May 2014. The lull in attacks coincided with a new Obama administration policy requiring a "near certainty" that civilians would not be harmed, requests from lawmakers that the drone program be brought under operational control of the Department of Defense (for better congressional oversight), a reduced US military and CIA presence in Afghanistan, a reduced al-Qaida presence in Pakistan, and an increased military role (at the expense of the CIA) in the execution of drone strikes.

However, June 2014 saw a drone strike kill 13 people; the attack was again condemned by Pakistan as a violation of its sovereignty. A month later, in July 2014, a similar attack which killed six militants was again criticized by the Pakistani government, particularly as it had just launched an offensive against militants in the area where the strike occurred. On 16 July 2014, Pakistan conducted a drone attack in North Waziristan killing militants.

US hostage Warren Weinstein, Italian hostage Giovanni Lo Porto, and American al Qaeda leaders Ahmed Farouq and Adam Gadahn, were killed in a January 2015 US-led drone strike on the Afghanistan-Pakistan border, as announced by U.S. President Barack Obama at a White House press conference on 23 April 2015. They were killed by a "signature strike", one that is launched based on behavioural evidence around a site suggesting a high-value target is inside, without knowing who is actually inside.

== Targeting process and drones ==
=== Drone operations ===
In September 2011, around 30 Predator drones and Reaper drones were operating under CIA direction in the Afghanistan/Pakistan area of operations in September 2011. The drones are flown by United States Air Force pilots located at an unnamed base in the United States. US Department of Defense armed drones, which also sometimes take part in strikes on terrorist targets, are flown by US Air Force pilots located at Creech Air Force Base and Holloman Air Force Base.

The CIA drones are operated by an office called the Pakistan-Afghanistan Department, which operates under the CIA's Counterterrorism Center (CTC), based at CIA's headquarters in Langley, Virginia. As of September 2011, the CTC had about 2,000 people on staff. Former CIA officials state that the agency used screening process in making decisions on which individuals to kill via drone strikes. The process, carried out at the agency's counterterrorist center, reportedly involved up to 10 lawyers who wrote briefs justifying the targeting of specific individuals. According to the former officials, if a brief's argument is weak, the request to target the individual is denied.

=== Missiles ===
According to unnamed counterterrorism officials, in 2009 or 2010 CIA drones began employing smaller missiles in airstrikes in Pakistan in order to reduce civilian casualties. The new missiles, called the Small Smart Weapon or Scorpion, are reportedly about the size of a violin case (21 inches long) and weigh 16 kg. The missiles are used in combination with new technology intended to increase accuracy and expand surveillance, including the use of small, unarmed surveillance drones to exactly pinpoint the location of targets.

These "micro-UAVs" (unmanned aerial vehicles) can be roughly the size of a pizza platter and meant to monitor potential targets at close range, for hours or days at a time. One former U.S. official who worked with micro-UAVs said that they can be almost impossible to detect at night. "It can be outside your window and you won't hear a whisper," the official said. The drone operators also have changed to trying to target insurgents in vehicles rather than residences to reduce the chances of civilian casualties.

=== Signature targeting ===
Since 2008 the CIA has relied less on its list of individuals and increasingly targeted "signatures," or suspect behavior. This change in tactics has resulted in fewer deaths of high-value targets and in more deaths of lower-level fighters, or "mere foot soldiers" as the one senior Pakistani official told The Washington Post. Signature strikes there must be supported by two sources of corroborating intelligence. Sources of intelligence include information from a communication intercept, a sighting of militant training camps or intelligence from CIA assets on the ground. "Signature targeting" has been the source of controversy. Drone critics argue that regular citizen behaviors can easily be mistaken for militant signatures.

=== U.S. congressional oversight ===
At Senator Dianne Feinstein's insistence, beginning in early 2010 staffs of the United States House Permanent Select Committee on Intelligence and United States Senate Select Committee on Intelligence have begun reviewing each CIA drone strike. The staff members hold monthly meetings with CIA personnel involved with the drone campaign, review videos of each strike, and attempt to confirm that the strike was executed properly.

== Casualties ==
Reports of the number of militant versus civilian casualties differ. The strikes led to the deaths of militants from various organizations (Pakistani Taliban, Afghan Taliban, Al-Qaeda, Haqqani Network, etc.), including some high-level leaders. These have included the head (emir) of the Afghan Taliban, multiple heads of the Pakistani Taliban, the deputy commander of the Pakistani Taliban, the top commander of the Haqqani Network, and the deputy commander of al-Qaeda in the Indian Subcontinent.

=== United States and CIA position ===
In general, the CIA and other American agencies have claimed a high rate of militant killings, relying in part on a disputed estimation method that "counts all military-age males in a strike zone as combatants ... unless there is explicit intelligence posthumously proving them innocent". For instance, the CIA has claimed that strikes conducted between May 2010 and August 2011 killed over 600 militants without any civilian fatalities, a claim that many have disputed. In an interview in October 2013, one former drone operator described events suggesting that child casualties may go unrecognized in some mission assessments.

The CIA has claimed that the strikes conducted between May 2010 and August 2011 killed over 600 militants and did not result in any civilian fatalities; this assessment has been criticized by Bill Roggio from the Long War Journal and other commentators as being unrealistic. Unnamed American officials who spoke to The New York Times claimed that, as of August 2011, the drone campaign had killed over 2,000 militants and approximately 50 non-combatants.

A January 2011 report by Bloomberg stated that civilian casualties in the strikes had apparently decreased. According to the report, the U.S. government believed that 1,300 militants and only 30 civilians had been killed in drone strikes since mid-2008, with no civilians killed since August 2010.

The New York Times reported in 2013 that the Obama administration embraced a disputed method for counting civilian casualties, which in effect counts all military-age males in a strike zone as combatants, giving partial explanation to the official claims of extraordinarily low collateral deaths. At other points, United States officials had claimed that interviews with locals do not provide accurate numbers of civilian casualties because relatives or acquaintances of the dead refuse to state that the victims were involved in militant activities.

=== Pakistan position ===
In one report, the Pakistani military stated that most of those killed were Al-Qaeda and Taliban militants. However, a formerly classified Pakistani government report obtained in July 2013 by the BIJ shows details of 75 drone strikes that occurred between 2006 and 2009. According to the 12-page report, in this period, 176 of the 746 reported dead were civilians. In March 2011 the General Officer Commanding of 7th division of Pakistani Army, Major General Ghayur Mehmood delivered a briefing "Myths and rumours about US predator strikes" in Miramshah. He said that most of those who were killed by the drone strikes were Al-Qaeda and Taliban terrorists. Military's official paper on the attacks till 7 March 2011 said that between 2007 and 2011 about 164 predator strikes had been carried out and over 964 terrorists had been killed. Those killed included 793 locals and 171 foreigners. The foreigners included Arabs, Uzbeks, Tajiks, Chechens, Filipinos and Moroccans.

In October 2013, Pakistan's Ministry of Defense stated that 67 civilians had been among the 2,227 people killed in 317 drone strikes since 2008. The Ministry said that the remainder of those killed were Islamic militants. However this statement was heavily criticized by the local and international research groups and the Foreign Ministry of Pakistan as being a gross understatement and largely inaccurate. Also refuting the Ministry of Defense's claim, the director of the FATA Research Centre, an Islamabad-based academic group that has researchers in the region said that more than 100 civilians had died in just two attacks in recent years.

=== New America Foundation studies ===
The New America Foundation has estimated that 80 percent of those killed in the attacks were militants. A study called "The Year of the Drone" published in February 2010 by the New America Foundation found that from a total of 114 drone strikes in Pakistan between 2004 and early 2010, between 834 and 1,216 individuals had been killed. About two thirds of these were thought to be militants and one third were civilians.

An oft-quoted 2010 study by Peter Bergen and Katherine Tiedemann at the New America Foundation went as follows: "Our study shows that the 265 reported drone strikes in Northwest Pakistan, including 52 in 2011, from 2004 to the present, have killed approximately between 1,628 and 2,561 individuals, of whom around 1,335 to 2,090 were described as militants in reliable press accounts. Thus, the true non-militant fatality rate since 2004 according to our analysis is approximately 20 percent. Prior to 2010 it was 5 percent." In a separate report, written by Bergen in 2012, he commented that civilian casualties continued to fall even as drone strikes increased, concluding that "Today, for the first time, the estimated civilian death rate is close to zero." However, Several experts have stated that far fewer militants and many more civilians have been killed. In a 2009 opinion article, Daniel L. Byman of the Brookings Institution wrote that drone strikes may have killed "10 or so civilians" for every militant that they killed.

The New America Foundation believes that between zero and 18 civilians have been killed in drone strikes since 23 August 2010 and that overall civilian casualties have decreased from 25% of the total in prior years to an estimated 6% in 2010. The foundation estimates that between 277 and 435 non-combatants have died since 2004, out of 1,374 to 2,189 total deaths.

The New America Foundation stated in mid-2011 that from 2004 to 2011, 80% of the 2,551 people killed in the strikes were militants. The foundation stated that 95% of those killed in 2010 were militants and that, as of 2012, 15% of the total people killed by drone strikes were either civilians or unknown.

==== New America Foundation statistics ====
U.S. drone strike statistics estimate, according to the New America Foundation (as of 1 January 2018):
Year	Attacks	Casualties			
Year	Attacks	Militants	Civilians	Unknown	Total
2004	1	3	2	2	7
2005	3	5	6	4	15
2006	2	1	93	0	94
2007	4	51	0	12	63
2008	36	223	28	47	298
2009	54	387	70	92	549
2010	122	788	16	45	849
2011	70	415	62	35	512
2012	48	268	5	33	306
2013	26	145	4	4	153
2014	22	145	0	0	145
2015	10	57	0	0	57
2016	3	9	0	0	9
2017	8	36	2	1	39
Total	409	2,533	288	275	3,096

=== Other studies ===
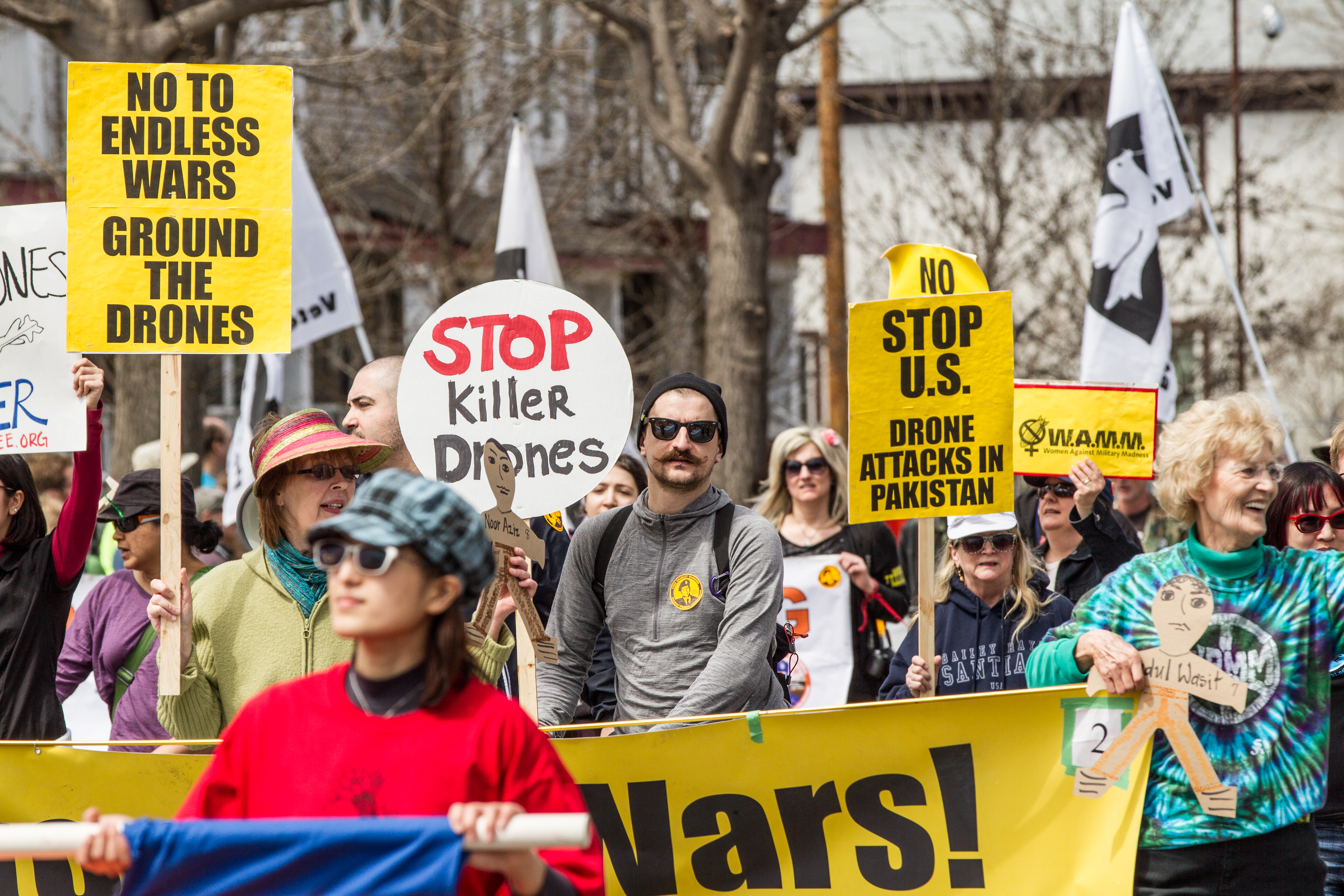
Minneapolis anti-war protest: 'Stop Killer Drones', 5 May 2013

According to a report of the Islamabad-based Conflict Monitoring Center (CMC), as of 2011 more than 2000 persons have been killed, and most of those deaths were civilians. The CMC termed the CIA drone strikes as an "assassination campaign turning out to be revenge campaign", and showed that 2010 was the deadliest year so far regarding casualties resulting from drone attacks, with 134 strikes inflicting over 900 deaths.

According to the Long War Journal, as of mid-2011, the drone strikes in Pakistan since 2006 had killed 2,018 militants and 138 civilians. The foundation also states that in 2012 the rate of civilian and unknown casualties was 2 percent, whereas the Bureau of Investigative Journalism say the rate of civilian casualties for 2012 is 9 percent.

An independent research site Pakistan Body Count run by Dr. Zeeshan-ul-hassan, a Fulbright scholar keeping track of all the drone attacks, claims that 2179 civilians were among the dead, and 12.4% children and women. A report by the Bureau of Investigative Journalism, released 4 February 2012, stated that under the Obama administration (2008–2011) drone strikes killed between 282 and 535 civilians, including 60 children.

A February 2012 Associated Press investigation found that militants were the main victims of drone strikes in North Waziristan contrary to the "widespread perception in Pakistan that civilians ... are the principal victims." The AP studied 10 drone strikes. Their reporters spoke to about 80 villagers in North Waziristan, and were told that at least 194 people died in the ten attacks. According to the villagers 56 of those were either civilians or tribal police and 138 were militants. Thirty-eight of the civilians died in a single attack on 17 March 2011. Villagers stated that one way to tell if civilians were killed was to observe how many funerals took place after a strike; the bodies of militants were usually taken elsewhere for burial, while civilians were usually buried immediately and locally.

Research published by Reprieve in 2014 suggested that U.S. drone strikes in Yemen and Pakistan have had an unknown person to target casualty ratio of 28:1 with one attack in the study having a ratio of 128:1 with 13 children being killed.

=== Bureau of Investigative Journalism statistics ===
The Bureau of Investigative Journalism, based on extensive research in mid-2011, claims that "credible reports" indicate 392 civilians were among the dead, including 175 children, out of the 2,347 people reported killed in US attacks since 2004. In the same article, the BIJ also claimed that "the intended targets – militants in the tribal areas – appear to make up the majority of those killed. There are almost 150 named militants among the dead since 2004, though hundreds are unknown, low-ranking fighters."

The Bureau of Investigative Journalism estimates the following cumulative statistics about U.S. drone strikes (as of 17 September 2017):

- Total strikes: 429
- Total killed: 2,514 – 4,023
- Civilians killed: 424 – 969
- Children killed: 172 – 207
- Injured: 1,162 – 1,749
- Strikes under the Bush administration: 51
- Strikes under the Obama administration: 373
- Strikes under the first Trump administration: 5
- 84 of the 2,379 dead have been identified as members of al-Qaeda

The Bureau also claimed that since Obama took office at least 50 civilians were killed in follow-up strikes when they had gone to help victims and more than 20 civilians have also been attacked in strikes on funerals and mourners, a practice condemned by legal experts.

== Studies on impact ==
=== Effectiveness in counterterrorism ===
According to a 2018 study in the journal International Security, there is scant evidence that drone strikes in Pakistan radicalize at the local, national or transnational level. According to a 2016 study in International Studies Quarterly, drone strikes are an effective counterterrorist tool in Pakistan. The study found that "drone strikes are associated with decreases in the incidence and lethality of terrorist attacks, as well as decreases in selective targeting of tribal elders." Analysis by the RAND Corporation suggests that "drone strikes are associated with decreases in the incidence and lethality of terrorist attacks" in Pakistan.

According to a quantitative analysis on drone strikes in Pakistan conducted by Stanford University postdoctoral fellows Asfandyar Mir and Dylan Moore, "the drone strike program was associated with monthly reductions of around 9–13 insurgent attacks and 51–86 casualties in the area affected by the program. This change was sizable as in the year before the program the affected area experienced around 21 attacks and 100 casualties per month. Additional quantitative and qualitative evidence suggests that this drop is attributable to the drone program." In addition to the actual damage dealt, drone strikes changed "the insurgents' perception of the risk", and caused them "to avoid targeting, severely compromising their movement and communication abilities." Another quantitative study, published in International Studies Quarterly by Stanford fellow Anoop K. Sarbahi, found that "drone strikes are associated with decreases in the incidence and lethality of terrorist attacks, as well as decreases in selective targeting of tribal elders" based on "detailed data on US drone strikes and terrorism in Pakistan from 2007 to 2011."

An earlier survey in 2016 focusing specifically on the North Waziristan region (n=148), the region most affected by the Taliban insurgency, showed similar results. Over 79 percent of those polled supported the U.S. drone strikes, 56 percent believed that "the drones seldom killed non-militants", and more than 66 percent believed "most of the non-militant civilians who die in drone attacks are known militant collaborators who may already be radicalized." Additionally, the majority of respondents agreed that the drone campaign decisively broke the back of the Pakistani Taliban in the region. A student from the town of Mir Ali explained local sentiment: "When the government left us at the mercy of the cruel Taliban, we used to feel utterly helpless and cower in fear. Since nobody seemed concerned with our plight, the drones were the closest thing to getting your prayers answered."

=== Terrorism and recruitment ===
However, according to analysis by the Oxford Research Group, although the drone strikes reduced terrorist activity in the Federally Administered Tribal Areas, they increased the amount of terrorist attacks in Pakistani cities such as Karachi, where the militant groups relocated to avoid the drones. Barbara Elias-Sanborn has claimed that, "as much of the literature on drones suggests, such killings usually harden militants' determination to fight, stalling any potential negotiations and settlement."

Political scientist and Carnegie Endowment fellow Aquil Shah conducted one such study on the impact of drone strikes on local attitudes in 2018 for the journal International Security, based on interview and survey data from Pakistan (n=167), which Shah claims provides a more complete and accurate view than opposing points "based primarily on anecdotal evidence, unreliable media reports, and advocacy-driven research." Shah's study found that there was "little or no evidence [in the data] that drone strikes have a significant impact on militant Islamist recruitment either locally or nationally. Rather, the data reveals the importance of factors such as political and economic grievances, the Pakistani state's selective counterterrorism policies, its indiscriminate repression of the local population, and forced recruitment of youth by militant groups." The study also extended to trial testimony and accounts of domestic Islamic terrorists in the United States and Europe. In their case, there was "scant evidence that drone strikes are the main cause of militant Islamism. Instead, factors that matter include a transnational Islamic identity's appeal to young immigrants with conflicted identities, state immigration and integration policies that marginalize Muslim communities, the influence of peers and social networks, and online exposure to violent jihadist ideologies."

== Reactions ==
=== Al Qaeda and other militants' response ===
Messages recovered from Osama bin Laden's home after his death in 2011, including one from then al Qaeda No. 3, Atiyah Abd al-Rahman reportedly, according to the Agence France-Presse and The Washington Post, expressed frustration with the drone strikes in Pakistan. According to an unnamed U.S. government official, in his message al-Rahman complained that drone-launched missiles were killing al Qaeda operatives faster than they could be replaced. In documents captured from Osama bin Laden's compound on Abbottabad, the Al-Qaeda leader talked extensively about American drones (referred to as "spy planes"), citing them as the chief threat to Al-Qaeda and its allies. He stated that "over the last two years, the problem of the spying war and spying aircrafts [sic] benefited the enemy greatly and led to the killing of many jihadi cadres, leaders, and others. This is something that is concerning us and exhausting us." He also advised his men, as well as their affiliates in Somalia, to avoid cars, as American drones had been targeting them, and to "benefit from the art of gathering and dispersion experience, as well as movement, night and day transportation, camouflage, and other techniques related to war tricks." In June and July 2011, law enforcement authorities found messages on al Qaeda-linked websites calling for attacks against executives of drone aircraft manufacturer AeroVironment. Law enforcement believed that the messages were in response to calls for action against Americans by Adam Yahiye Gadahn.

==== Targeting of informants ====
Paranoia over being targeted by drone strikes has led to wide-scale executions of suspected spies by Taliban agents in the Federally Administered Tribal Areas region, including the creation of a special task force Lashkar al Khorasan for this purpose in North Waziristan. This has extended to the Pakistani Taliban publicly executing dozens of local car mechanics whom they accused of bugging their trucks and cars. Vehicles are particularly preferred as targets by the CIA because the drones could see who entered the vehicles and target them when they were driving in isolated areas. The Los Angeles Times has reported that in North Waziristan a militant group called Khorasan Mujahedin targets people suspected of being informants. According to the report, the group kidnaps people from an area suspected of selling information that led to the strike, tortures and usually kills them, and sells videotapes of killings in street markets as warnings to others.

==== Link to terror attacks ====
A motive that the 2010 Times Square car bomber Faisal Shahzad stated was the repeated CIA drone attacks in Pakistan, his native country. Baitullah Mehsud of Tehrik-i-Taliban Pakistan, while claiming responsibility for the 2009 Lahore police academy attacks, stated that they were acting in retaliation for the drone attacks.

=== People in the United States ===
US Congressman Dennis Kucinich asserted that the United States was violating international law by carrying out strikes against a country that never attacked the United States. Georgetown University professor Gary D. Solis asserts that since the drone operators at the CIA are civilians directly engaged in armed conflict, this makes them "unlawful combatants" and possibly subject to prosecution. One of the leading critics of drones in the US Congress is Senator Rand Paul. In 2013, he performed a thirteen-hour filibuster to try to achieve a public admission from U.S. President Obama that he could not kill an American citizen with a drone on American soil, who was not actively engaged in combat. Attorney General Eric Holder responded soon after, confirming that the president had no authority to use drones for this purpose.

In a February 2012 poll of 1,000 US adults, 83% of them (77% of the liberal Democrats) replied they support the drone strikes.

=== People in Pakistan ===
The strikes are often linked to anti-American sentiment in Pakistan and the growing questionability of the scope and extent of CIA activities in Pakistan. The expressions of anger in Pakistan about the continuance of drone strikes peaked at the end of November 2013 as a political party announced publicly the alleged name of the CIA's station chief in Islamabad, and called for them and CIA director John Brennan to be tried for murder.

==== Opinion polls, studies, and surveys ====
According to a report by researchers at Stanford and New York University law schools in 2012, civilians in Waziristan interviewed for the report believed "that the US actively seeks to kill them simply for being Muslims, viewing the drone campaign as a part of a religious crusade against Islam." Many professionals working in Waziristan believe that drone strikes encourage terrorism. The report notes similar conclusions reached by reporters for Der Spiegel, The New York Times and CNN.

US drone strikes are extremely unpopular in Pakistan. A 2012 poll by the Pew Research Center's Global Attitude project found that only 17% of Pakistanis supported drone strikes. And remarkably, among those who professed to know a lot or a little about drones, 97% considered drone strikes bad policy.

— Stanford Law School, September 2012

According to ongoing surveys of public opinion conducted by the New America Foundation, 9 out of 10 of civilians in Waziristan "oppose the U.S. military pursuing al-Qaeda and the Taliban" and nearly 70% "want the Pakistani military alone to fight Taliban and al-Qaeda militants in the tribal areas."

According to a public opinion survey conducted between November 2008 and January 2009 by the Pakistani Aryana Institute for Regional Research and Advocacy, approximately half of the respondents considered drone strikes in Federally Administered Tribal Areas accurate and approximately the same number of respondents said that the strikes did not lead to anti-American sentiment and were effective in damaging the militants. The researchers concluded that "the popular notion outside the Pakhtun belt that a large majority of the local population supports the Taliban movement lacks substance." According to Farhat Taj a member of AIRRA the drones have never killed any civilians. Some people in Waziristan compare the drones to Ababils, the holy swallows sent by Allah to avenge Abraha, the invader of the Khana Kaaba. Irfan Husain, writing in Dawn, agreed and called for more drone attacks: "We need to wake up to the reality that the enemy has grown very strong in the years we temporized and tried to do deals with them. Clearly, we need allies in this fight. Howling at the moon is not going to get us the cooperation we so desperately need. A solid case can be made for more drone attacks, not less." In October 2013, the Economist found support among locals for the drone attacks as protection against the militants, claiming no civilians were killed this year. A 2014 study in Political Science Quarterly and a 2015 study in the Journal of Strategic Studies disputes that drone strikes are a major source of anger for Pakistanis.

=== Political activism and social movements ===
==== United States ====
During a protest against drone attacks, in an event sponsored by Nevada Desert Experience, Father Louie Vitale, Kathy Kelly, Stephen Kelly (SJ), Eve Tetaz, John Dear, and others were arrested outside Creech Air Force Base on Wednesday 9 April 2009.

==== Pakistan ====
Imran Khan, chairman Pakistan Tehreek-e-Insaf political party in Pakistan, announced a Peace March to South Waziristan on 6–7 October 2012 to create global awareness about innocent civilian deaths in US drone attacks. He proposed to take a rally of 100,000 people from Islamabad to South Waziristan. The South Waziristan administration denied the group permission for the rally on the grounds that they can not provide security, but PTI has maintained that they will go ahead with the Peace March. Many International human rights activists and NGOs have shown their support to the Peace March, with former US colonel Ann Wright and British NGO Reprieve joining the Peace March. Pakistani Taliban have agreed to not attack the Peace rally and offered to provide security for the rally.

== Legal and human rights issues ==
=== U.S. legal justification ===
The US government cited the inability of states to control and keep track of terrorist activities as a characteristic of a failed state, represented by the lack of military and governmental control in Pakistan's Federally Administered Tribal Areas, and was operating within the states' right of self-defense according to Article 51 in Chapter VII of the United Nations Charter. In President Obama's 2013 speech at the National Defense University, he stated "we act against terrorists who pose a continuing and imminent threat to the American people, and when there are no other governments capable of effectively addressing the threat". On 25 March 2010 US State Department legal advisor Harold Koh stated that the drone strikes were legal because of the right to self-defense. According to Koh, the US is involved in an armed conflict with al Qaeda, the Taliban, and their affiliates and therefore may use force consistent with self-defense under international law.

In 2012, The Obama administration offered its first extensive explanation on drone-strike policy in April 2012, concluding that it was "legal, ethical and wise". The CIA's general counsel, Stephen Preston, in a speech entitled "CIA and the Rule of Law" at Harvard Law School on 10 April 2012, claimed the agency was not bound by the laws of war; in response, Human Rights Watch called for the strike program to be brought under the control of the US military.

=== U.N. human rights concerns ===
The British human rights group Reprieve filed a case with the United Nations Human Rights Council, based on affidavits by 18 family members of civilians killed in the attacks – many of them children. They are calling on the UNHRC "to condemn the attacks as illegal human rights violations."

On 3 June 2009, the United Nations Human Rights Council (UNHRC) delivered a report sharply critical of US tactics. The report asserted that the US government has failed to keep track of civilian casualties of its military operations, including the drone attacks, and to provide means for citizens of affected nations to obtain information about the casualties and any legal inquests regarding them. Any such information held by the U.S. military is allegedly inaccessible to the public due to the high level of secrecy surrounding the drone attacks program. The US representative at UNHRC has argued that the UN investigator for extrajudicial, summary or arbitrary executions does not have jurisdiction over US military actions, while another US diplomat claimed that the US military is investigating any wrongdoing and doing all it can to furnish information about the deaths.

On 27 October 2009 UNHRC investigator Philip Alston called on the US to demonstrate that it was not randomly killing people in violation of international law through its use of drones on the Afghan border. Alston criticized the US's refusal to respond to date to the UN's concerns. Said Alston, "Otherwise you have the really problematic bottom line, which is that the Central Intelligence Agency is running a program that is killing significant numbers of people and there is absolutely no accountability in terms of the relevant international laws."

On 2 June 2010 Alston's team released a report on its investigation into the drone strikes, criticizing the United States for being "the most prolific user of targeted killings" in the world. Alston, however, acknowledged that the drone attacks may be justified under the right to self-defense. He called on the US to be more open about the program. Alston's report was submitted to the United Nations Commission on Human Rights the following day.

On 7 June 2012, after a four-day visit to Pakistan, UN High Commissioner for Human Rights Navi Pillay called for a new investigation into US drone strikes in Pakistan, repeatedly referring to the attacks as "indiscriminate," and said that the attacks constitute human rights violations. In a report issued on 18 June 2012, Christof Heyns, U.N. special rapporteur on extrajudicial, summary or arbitrary executions, called on the Obama administration to justify its use of targeted assassinations rather than attempting to capture al Qaeda or Taliban suspects.

In March 2013, Ben Emmerson, the United Nations Special Rapporteur, led a U.N. team that looked into civilian casualties from the U.S. drone attacks, and stated that the attacks are a violation of the sovereignty of Pakistan. Emmerson said government officials from the country clearly stated Pakistan does not agree to the drone attacks, which is contradicted by U.S. officials.

=== Lawsuits ===
In December 2010 the CIA's Station Chief in Islamabad operating under the alias Jonathan Banks was hastily pulled from the country. Lawsuits filed by families of victims of drone strikes had named Banks as a defendant, he had been receiving death threats, and a Pakistani journalist whose brother and son died in a drone strike called for prosecuting Banks for murder.

=== Pakistani law ===
In May 2013, a Pakistani court ruled that CIA drone strikes in Pakistan were illegal. A Peshawar High Court judge said the Pakistani government must end drone strikes, using force if needed.

=== Other reports ===
In October 2013, Amnesty International brought out a detailed study of the impact of drone strikes that strongly condemned the strikes. The report stated that the number of arbitrary civilian deaths, the tactics used (such as follow-up attacks targeting individuals helping the wounded) and the violation of Pakistani sovereignty meant that some of the strikes could be considered as unlawful executions and war crimes.

On 14 July 2009, Daniel L. Byman of the Brookings Institution stated that although accurate data on the results of drone strikes is difficult to obtain, it seemed that ten civilians had died in the drone attacks for every militant killed. Byman argues that civilian killings constitute a humanitarian tragedy and create dangerous political problems, including damage to the legitimacy of the Pakistani government and alienation of the Pakistani populace from America. He suggested that the real answer to halting al-Qaeda's activity in Pakistan will be long-term support of Pakistan's counterinsurgency efforts.

A September 2012 report by researchers from Stanford University and New York University criticized the drone campaign, stating that it was killing a high number of civilians and turning the Pakistani public against the United States. The report, compiled by interviewing witnesses, drone-attack survivors, and others in Pakistan provided by a Pakistani human rights organization, Foundation for Fundamental Rights, concluded that only 2% of drone strike victims are "high-level" militant leaders. The report's authors did not estimate the numbers of total civilian casualties, but suggested that the February 2012 Bureau of Investigative Journalism report was more accurate than the Long War Journal report on civilian casualties. The report also opined that the drone attacks were violations of international law, because the US government had not shown that the targets were direct threats to the US. The report further noted the US policy of considering all military-age males in a strike zone as militants following the air strike unless exonerating evidence proves otherwise. Media outlets were also urged to cease using the term "militant" when reporting on drone attacks without further explanation.

== See also ==
- Drone strikes in Yemen, Afghanistan, Libya and Somalia
- Pakistan–United States military relations
- Saheb al-Amiri
- Disposition Matrix—database of US capture/kill list
- List of terrorist incidents in Pakistan since 2001
- Terrorism in Pakistan
- Violence in Pakistan 2006-09
- Unmanned: America's Drone Wars (2013 documentary film)
- Good Kill (2014 film)
