= Akhtar Hussain =

Akhtar Hussain may refer to:

- Akhtar Hussain Khan (musician) (1896–1974), Indian classical musician
- Akhtar Hussain (field hockey) (1926–1987), field hockey player who represented both India and Pakistan at the Summer Olympics
- Akhtar Hussain (lawyer) (born 1946), Pakistani lawyer and politician
- Akhtar Hussain Malik (1910s–1969), Pakistani army general
- Akhter Husain (1902–1983), Pakistani statesman and civil servant
- Akhtar Hussain (umpire) (died 1973), Pakistani cricket umpire
- Akhtar Husain (1912–1992), Pakistani writer
- Akhtar Hossain (1945–2026), Bangladeshi children's writer
- Akhtar Hussain (sarangi player) (born 1959), Pakistani musician
- Akhter Hossen (born 1997), Bangladeshi politician
- Akhtar Hossain Bhuiyan (born 1959), Bangladeshi government official
- Md. Akther Hossain (born 1963), Bangladeshi government official
