= Rafiq Ahmad Pampori =

Indian scholar and academic

Rector of Darul Uloom Ilahiya, Srinagar
- Incumbent
- Assumed office 1992
- Preceded by: "post established"

Principal of Government Medical College, Srinagar
- In office 1 October 2012 – 19 December 2015
- Preceded by: Qazi Masood
- Succeeded by: Kaisar Ahmad

Personal life
- Born: 13 February 1956 (age 70) Safa Kadal, Srinagar, India
- Notable work(s): Aijazul Qur'ān, Ra'fatul Baari
- Education: Sri Pratap College; Government Medical College, Srinagar

Religious life
- Religion: Islam
- Founder of: Darul Uloom Ilahiya

Muslim leader
- Influenced by: Muhammad Masihullah Khan

Rafiq Ahmad Pampori (born 13 February 1956) is an Indian Islamic scholar, academic and a writer, and a former principal of Government Medical College in Srinagar. He is the founder and rector of the Darul Uloom Ilahiya, an Islamic seminary in Srinagar, and is seen as a top practitioner of neuroscience in Jammu and Kashmir. His books include Aijazul Qur'ān and Ra'fatul Baari, a five-volume commentary on the Sahih Bukhari.

== Biography ==
Rafiq Ahmad Pampori was born on 13 February 1956 in Safa Kadal in Srinagar, Kashmir. He received his primary education at the National School in Karan Nagar and completed his higher secondary education from the Sri Pratap College in 1974. He studied medicine at the Government Medical College, Srinagar, where he obtained a Bachelor of Medicine and Surgery (MBBS) in 1979, and then a Master of Surgery in Otorhinolaryngology (ENT) from the same college in 1983. He did his Neurotology fellowship at the All India Institute of Medical Sciences in New Delhi. He benefitted from Muhammad Masihullah Khan in Sufism.

In 1983, Ahmad was appointed registrar of the Government Medical College, Srinagar. In 1990, he was appointed a lecturer in the ENT department of the college and later became its head professor. He was appointed the principal of the college on 1 October 2012. He went on a protest leave in December 2015 seeking voluntarily retirement, while his tenure as the principal was to end on 1 February 2018. He cited that "he cannot see the institutions (GMC and Associated Hospital) deteriorating". It was said that he was forced to apply for the premature retirement by Lal Singh Chaudhary, a politician of the BJP.

Ahmad withdrew his retirement plea at the request of Mufti Mohammad Sayeed. Meanwhile, Lal Singh had appointed Kaiser Ahmad as the interim principal on 19 December 2015, who denied to quit the post. It was seen as "a clash of egos and a PDP v/s BJP battle" by Omar Abdullah. According to Kashmir Observer, the government cleared the controversy declaring Kaiser as the principal on 22 December 2015.

Ahmad is seen as a top practitioner of neuroscience in Jammu and Kashmir. Influenced by Muhammad Masihullah Khan, he established the Darul Uloom Ilahiya in Srinagar in 1992 under Khan's guidance. Darul Uloom Ilahiya has several branches in Budgam, Ganderbal and Kulgam. Unlike other seminaries in Jammu and Kashmir, Ilhahiya teaches the dars-e-nizami curriculum according to the Federation of Islamic Institutions, Darul Uloom Deoband and secular education in accordance with the Jammu and Kashmir State Board of School Education. The seminary also runs a middle school where around three hundred students study.

Ahmad is also the founder and director of Illahiya Dialysis Center, Soura. It was set up by the Voluntary Medical Trust, of which Ahmad is chairman. He also serves as the rector of Darul Uloom Ilahiya since its inception in 1992.

== Publications ==
Ahmad has authored books such as Aijazul Qur'ān, Instrument For Understanding Qur'ān, Ra'fatul Baari (a five-volume commentary on Sahih Bukhari) and The Need for Divine Guidance. His other academic publications include:

- Chronic Suppurative Otitis Media, 10th chapter in Textbook of Ear, Nose and Throat Diseases by Mohammad Maqbool and Suhail Maqbool.
- Primary tumor of the facial nerve: Diagnosis and management.
- Transcervical foreign body.
