= Anil Bhan =

Indian heart surgeon

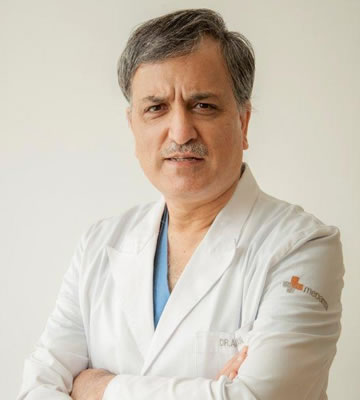
- Education: GMC Srinagar; PGIMER Chandigarh, AIIMS New Delhi (M.Ch.)
- Medical career
- Profession: Surgeon
- Field: Cardiovascular surgery
- Website: dranilbhan.com

Anil Bhan is an Indian physician and the chairman of Cardiac Surgery Heart Institute, Medanta Hospital, Gurgaon. He graduated from Government Medical College, Srinagar. He has the largest experience in aortic surgery in India since he has designed and developed more than 50 surgical instruments in the field of cardiac surgery. He was one of the team members to perform the first successful heart transplant in India in1994. He served as a co-founder of Max Heart and Vascular Institute, Saket, New Delhi, Director and Chief Co-Ordinator, Cardio thoracic and Vascular Surgery, MHVI, Saket. Additional Professor, Cardiothoracic Surgery and Vascular Surgery, AIIMS, New Delhi.

== Awards and recognitions ==
Bhan studied in C.M.S. Tyndale Biscoe School, Srinagar. He was awarded the certificate of Honor as "Best All Round Boy" in school. Also awarded Certificate of Honor for Best Performance in Matriculation. Stood First in Kashmir Province. He is a graduate from Medical College Srinagar – Distinction holder in Pharmacology, Pathology, Forensic Medicine, Internal Medicine, Surgery and Gynae/Obst. He did his Internship from Christian Medical College Vellore. He worked as a Pool Officer in Cardiothoracic and Vascular Surgery, All India Institute of Medical Sciences.

He is recipient of Certificate of distinction for first rank in Pre – Medical Examination of University of Kashmir, received certificate of distinction for securing first position in order of merit in MBBS examination of University of Kashmir.

== National awards ==
- Awarded "Silver Medal" at P.G.I. Chandigarh for first order performance in M.S., General Surgery examination.
- Awarded life Time Achievement Award at the world Congress of clinical and Preventive Cardiology, 2006. Conferred by former President of India Dr. A.P.J. Abdul Kalam in Rashtrapati Bhawan.
- Conferred the P K Sen Oration in 2009 by the Indian Association of Cardiovascular Surgery.
- Conferred the K.N.Dastur Oration in 2013 by the Indian Association of Cardiovascular Surgery.
- Awarded Life Time Achievement award by the Human Care Charitable Trust in 2014.
- Awarded Life Time Achievement Award by KECESS, Kashmir Education, Cultural and Science Society in view of my outstanding contribution in the field of Medical Sciences 2015.
- Awarded DMA Chikitsa Ratan Award by Delhi Medical Association in 2014.
- Felicitated by the Society of Heart Failure and Transplantation in Kochi, 2016 in recognition of the contribution in the Thoracic organ Transplantation in India.
- Felicitated by the Kashmir Medicos – Old Students Forum on 1 December 2007 for my outstanding and meritorious Services to Medical profession.
- Felicitation in view of my valuable contribution in Indian organ Donation and Awareness Program in Year 2015.
- IMA-New Delhi Branch, Distinguished Service Award for my contribution to CME promotion – 18th March2007.
- Awarded Magnanimous Award for outstanding contribution in the field of cardiac and thoracic surgery by IMA Academy of Medical Specialities, Sept. 2007
- Appreciation award by Rotary Clubs of Faridabad in 2005. District 3010
- Received "Nagrik Abhinandan" by the Gauravgatha Abhinandan Samaroh Samiti in 2010 at Agra.

== Contributions ==
- Part of the team that conducted the first successful Heart Transplantation in India under Professor Panangipalli Venugopal on 3 August 1994.
- Conducted the youngest Coronary Artery Bypass Surgery for patient aged 20 months.
- Modified Circuit for Retrograde Central Perfusion- Asian Cardiovascular Thoracic Annals, 2003, March:11(1);85-86 (Aortic surgery program).

=== Coronary Artery Bypass Surgery (CABG) ===
- Published one of the earliest reports on angiographic follow-up of OPCAB (Beating Heart CABG) from India. Accredited by Medtronics(U.S.).(Annals of Thoracic Surgery.2000;vol.69(4): 1216–1221).
- Published third report in the world literature on Radial artery angiographic follow up. (Annals Thoracic Surgery.1999;67(6):1631–1636)
- Published the data on adenosine preconditioning of the Myocardium in patients with ventricular dysfunction undergoing myocardial revascularisation.(Eur. J of Cardiothoracic Surgery. 2001;19(1):41-6.)
- Used for the first time Harmonic scalpel for the harvest of Radial and Internal mammary Artery conduits in India. (Asian Cardiovascular and Thoracic Annals. March, 7;(2001))

=== Pediatric cardiac surgery ===
- Described a new – operative technique for repair of supracardiac total anomalous pulmonary venous drainage. (Published in Annals of thoracic surgery- USA)
- Described a new operative technique for coarctation of aortic with type – B aortic dissection(Journal of Thoracic and Cardiovascular Surgery USA)

== Breakthrough cases ==
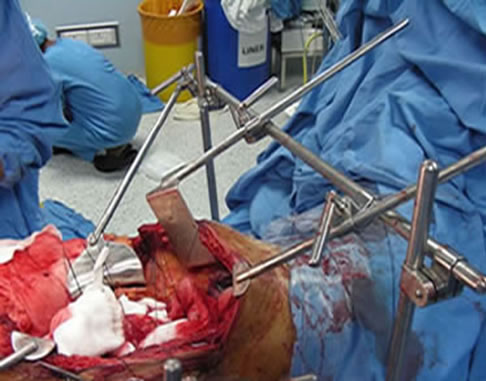
Thoraco-abdominal Aortic Aneurysm Retractor

- 11-month-old Nigerian baby undergoes rare heart surgery.
- 3-Month-Old Gets New Life After Heart Surgery – 12 May 2007
- Heart Bypass Surgery Done on 20-Month-Old – 29 May 2009
- 20-Month-Old Boy Undergoes Bypass
- Rare Heart Surgery Performed on Infant
- Indore creates record with first heart transplantation
- Total arterial revascularisation in a child with familial homozygous hypercholesterolemia

== Instruments designed ==
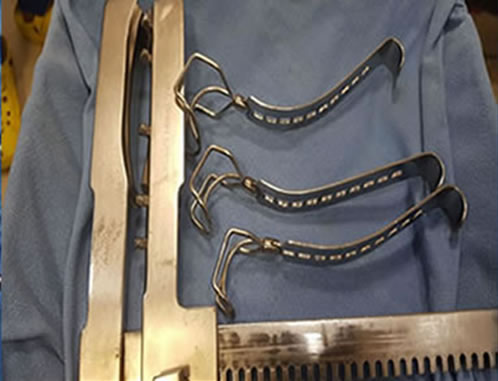
Self Retaining Mitral Valve Retractor

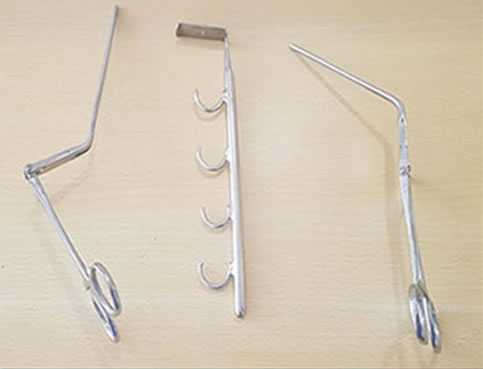
MICS instruments with unique licking aortic clamp

Designed and developed more than 50 instruments for minimally invasive cardiac surgery. Thoracic and thoraco-abdominal aortic aneurysms, mitral valve surgery and the beating heart coronary artery bypass surgery.
