= SMHS Hospital =

Government hospital in Srinagar, Jammu and Kashmir, India

Shri Maharaja Hari Singh Hospital
- Government Medical College, Srinagar
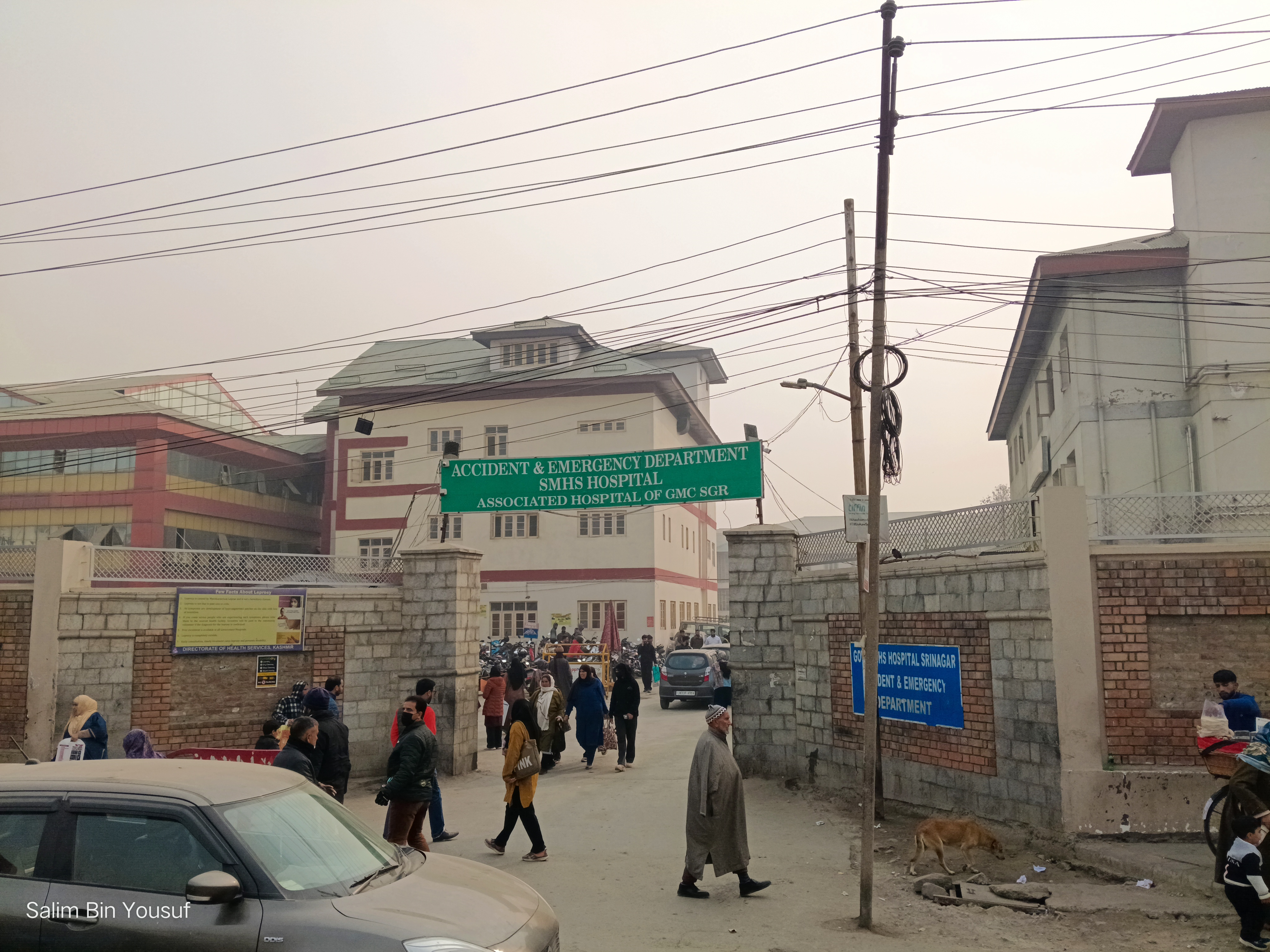

Geography
- Location: Karan Nagar, Srinagar, Jammu and Kashmir, India
- Coordinates: 34.08616°N 74.79731°E

Organisation
- Care system: Public
- Type: Multi-speciality, Teaching
- Affiliated university: Government Medical College, Srinagar

Services
- Emergency department: Yes
- Beds: 890

History
- Founded: 1948; 78 years ago

Links
- Lists: Hospitals in India

Shri Maharaja Hari Singh Hospital, commonly known as SMHS Hospital or Hadwun Hospital (also spelled Hedwun Hospital), is a multi-disciplinary government hospital located in the Karan Nagar area of Srinagar, in the Indian union territory of Jammu and Kashmir. It is one of the largest tertiary care hospitals in the Kashmir Valley and is affiliated with the Government Medical College, Srinagar (GMC Srinagar).

== History ==
The history of SMHS Hospital is linked to C. M. Hadow, an Austrian merchant and philanthropist who came to Kashmir during the era of Ranbir Singh (Maharaja of Jammu and Kashmir from 1856 to 1885) to engage in the carpet trade. Hadow established a successful carpet weaving company, C. M. Hadow & Co., which became one of the leading carpet manufacturers of its time.

The Viceroy of India, the Marquess of Linlithgow, requested C. M. Hadow to donate his estate for the construction of the first state hospital. The Viceroy visited Kashmir in 1940 and laid the foundation of the state hospital at the site of the Hadow Mills Carpet Factory. According to local historian Dr. Ashraf Kashmiri, this is why the hospital is still casually known as "Hadwun" (Hadow's) Hospital.

Another Viceroy of India, Lord Wavell, came to Kashmir in 1945 to inaugurate the hospital. He inaugurated it on 11 October 1945. Dr. A. Mitra was appointed as its first Chief Medical Officer, who later served as Public Works Minister on the Maharaja's State Council. C. M. Hadow died in Kashmir in 1945, and his business was taken over by his son, K. C. Hadow. K. C. Hadow was later expelled from Kashmir in 1948 and retired to Victoria, British Columbia, where he died in 1978.

The hospital was officially established in 1948 as a government-owned general hospital, initially offering outpatient (OPD) and inpatient (IPD) services in General Medicine, General Surgery, and Gynaecology.

In 1959, the Government Medical College, Srinagar was established on the same campus, transforming SMHS Hospital into a major teaching institution for undergraduate and postgraduate medical students.

During the September 2014 floods, the hospital was damaged, and patients suffered due to a scarcity of medical facilities.

Between July 2016 and June 2018, the ophthalmology department at SMHS Hospital treated more than a thousand victims of pellet gun injuries in the hospital's four operating theatres and a trauma theatre in the emergency department.

== Infrastructure ==
SMHS Hospital is located in the Shireen Bagh area of Karan Nagar, Srinagar, near the Gole Market. The hospital's sanctioned bed strength is 750, but it currently operates with 890 beds.

The hospital's inpatient wards are organised as follows:

Inpatient Ward Allocation
Ward(s)	Department
Ward 1 & 2	Otorhinolaryngology (ENT)
Ward 3, 5, 6, 9, 10 & 11	Medicine
Ward 4	Dermatology
Ward 7 & 8	Ophthalmology
Ward 12, 15, 16, 18, 19 & 20	Surgery
Ward 13	Medical Intensive Coronary Care Unit (ICCU)
Ward 17	Surgical ICCU

In 2026, the Jammu and Kashmir government approved the construction of a state-of-the-art surgical theatre block at SMHS Hospital at an estimated cost of ₹50.24 crore.

== Patient services ==
On average, SMHS Hospital caters to approximately 3,200 patients daily in the outpatient and casualty departments. During the financial year 2023–24, the hospital recorded:

- 1,063,028 patients attended in the outpatient department
- 107,589 patients treated in the inpatient department
- 10,726 major surgeries performed
- 12,543 minor surgeries performed
- Approximately 30 major and 60 minor procedures performed daily

The hospital performs approximately 30 MRI scans, 450 ultrasounds, 125 CT scans, and 400 X-rays on a single day. About 6,000 laboratory tests are conducted daily.

The radiation oncology department treats about 110 patients daily, with 16 inpatient beds and 120 patients receiving radiation therapy each day.

== Departments ==
SMHS Hospital offers services in multiple specialities, including:

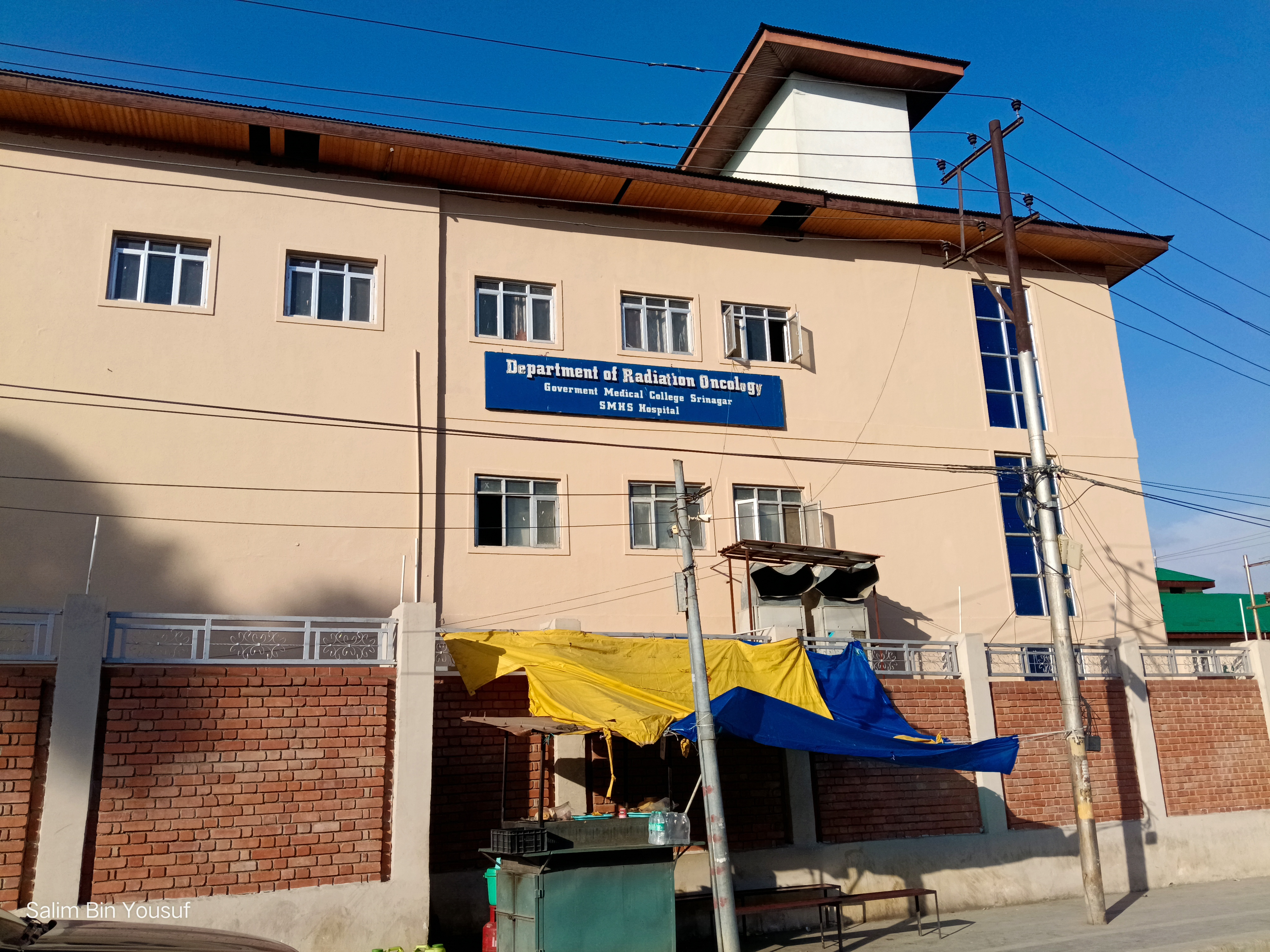
SHMS Hospital Oncology Department

- General Medicine
- General Surgery
- Cardiology
- Neurology
- Urology
- Gastroenterology
- Paediatric surgery
- Ophthalmology
- Orthopaedic surgery
- Otorhinolaryngology (ENT)
- Radiology
- Obstetrics and gynaecology
- Anaesthesiology
- Dermatology
- Radiation oncology

== Green initiatives ==
In August 2024, SMHS Hospital launched a massive plantation drive across its campus to create more green spaces. More than 200 saplings were planted, and a piece of land near the academic block was restored into a green space. A sanitation drive was also initiated, with morning, afternoon, and evening sanitation drives carried out daily across the hospital.

== Government inspections ==
In November 2024, the Minister for Health and Medical Education, Sakeena Masood, conducted a surprise inspection of SMHS Hospital to assess medical care facilities and the availability of essential services. She inspected the ICU, emergency wards, and other units, and interacted with patients and their attendants to gather feedback.

== Affiliations ==
SMHS Hospital is the primary teaching hospital of the Government Medical College, Srinagar. Medical students at GMC Srinagar examine patients at the hospital during their undergraduate and postgraduate courses to gain practical experience.

== See also ==
- Government Medical College, Srinagar
- List of hospitals in India
- Healthcare in India
