= Aryana Institute for Regional Research and Advocacy =

Defunct think tank in Pakistan

Aryana Institute for Regional Research and Advocacy was a think tank of researchers and activists from Federally Administered Tribal Areas (FATA) and Khyber-Pakhtunkhwa province of Pakistan. It claimed to conduct research on issues concerning Taliban and Al-Qaeda activities in the region. It was based in Islamabad. It was allegedly funded by the US Central Intelligence Agency.

== Activities ==
It claimed to have conducted a survey of the public opinion about the drone strikes in Federally Administered Tribal Areas between November 2008 and January 2009. It said that 5 teams of 5 researchers each interviewed a total of 550 people from all walks of life. Based on the responses the researchers concluded ' The popular notion outside the Pashtun belt that a large majority of the local population supports the Taliban movement lacks substance'. According to the research, most people also thought that the drone attacks were accurate and did not lead to anti American sentiment and were effective in damaging the militants. In addition the locals wanted the Pakistani forces to also target the militants.

Khadim Hussain a member of the institute criticized the attempt of Pakistani government to impose Islamic law in Malakand District and called it a surrender to the militants. In December 2009 he was quoted as saying that the entire FATA was controlled by Haqqani network and any efforts against Taliban that excluded them would be ineffective.

In an analysis published in Daily Times on January 2, 2010 author Farhat Taj, a member of the Institute challenged the view that the local people of Waziristan were against the drone attacks. Author states on the basis of personal interviews with people in Waziristan that the locals in Waziristan support the attacks and see the drones as their 'liberators' from the clutches of Taliban and Pakistan's Intelligence agencies. She further challenged the government of Pakistan to provide accurate figures about the 'civilian' casualties and tell what methodology was used to collect this data. According to her 'The people of Waziristan are suffering a brutal kind of occupation under the Taliban and al Qaeda. It is in this context that they would welcome anyone, Americans, Israelis, Indians or even the devil, to rid them of the Taliban and al Qaeda.'

In response to this analysis Irfan Husain writing in Dawn agreed with her assessment and called for more drone attacks. He wrote 'We need to wake up to the reality that the enemy has grown very strong in the years we temporized and tried to do deals with them. Clearly, we need allies in this fight. Howling at the moon is not going to get us the cooperation we so desperately need. A solid case can be made for more drone attacks, not less.

== See also ==
- War in North-West Pakistan
- Terrorism in Pakistan
- Drone attacks in Pakistan
