= Panangipalli Venugopal =

Indian cardiovascular surgeon (1942–2024)

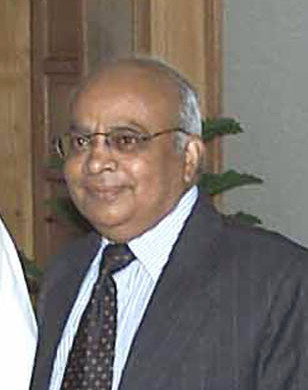
- Venugopal in 2005
- Born: 6 July 1942; Rajahmundry, Madras Province, British India
- Died: 8 October 2024 (aged 82); New Delhi, India
- Occupation: Cardiac Surgeon
- Awards: Padma Bhushan; Dr. B. C. Roy Award

Panangipalli Venugopal (6 July 1942 – 8 October 2024) was an Indian cardiovascular surgeon and hospital administrator from Rajahmundry, Andhra Pradesh, India who is widely regarded as a pioneer in cardiac surgery. The Government of India honored him, in 1998, with the Padma Bhushan, the third highest civilian award, for his services to the field of Medicine.

== Life ==
Venugopal was born at Rajahmundry, Madras Presidency, British India (present-day Andhra Pradesh), on 6 July 1942. He enrolled at the All India Institute of Medical Sciences (AIIMS), New Delhi, in 1959 to obtain his MB BS and continued his higher education at the institute itself. His first post graduate degree was the Master of Surgery (MS) which was followed by MCh in cardiovascular thoracic surgery, which he passed with honors.

In 1970–71, subsequent to his specialization, he joined the Faculty of AIIMS. the major part of his career was spent at AIIMS where he rose progressively, serving as the professor, the head of the department and then the dean, before reaching the post of the director, the highest academic position on offer at AIIMS, on 1 July 2003.

Soon after joining AIIMS, Venugopal participated in two advanced training programs, an adult Open Heart Surgery training under Denton Cooley at the Texas Heart Institute and paediatric open heart surgery under S. Subramanian, at the Children's Hospital, Buffalo, New York following which he launched the open heart surgery clinic at AIIMS, under the guidance of Professor N. Gopinath, in 1974. This was followed by the establishment of the Cardiothoracic Sciences Centre, where he performed the first heart transplantation in India on 3 August 1994 and, later, for the first time in Asia, the implantation of the Left Ventricular Assist Device.

After retirement from AIIMS, Venugopal, moved to the Alchemist Institute of Medical Sciences, in Gurgaon, Haryana as the head of the Cardithoracic department. He got married at the age of 55 and has a daughter.

Venugopal died in New Delhi on 8 October 2024, at the age of 82.

== Achievements ==
Venugopal pioneered heart transplant surgery in India, having performed the first successful heart transplant in the country, the count standing at 26 transplants. He performed the first implantation of left ventricular assist device, lasting for more than 90 days, in Asia. He introduced the stem cell therapy, for the first time in India, by the deployment of autologous stem cell implantation for repairing the myocardium as an alternative to transplantation, which he did on 26 patients. He pioneered the stem cell implantation procedure in pancreas for the treatment of Type II Diabetes. On the prolificacy of Venugopal, media reports are in general agreement of his involvement in the performance of over 50,000 open heart and 12,000 closed heart surgeries. He has been a recognized trainer, too, with more than 100 cardio-thoracic surgeons around the world, trained under him.

On the administrative front, he, along with N. Gopinath, started the open heart surgery in AIIMS. He was also behind the setting up of the Cardiothoracic Sciences Centre, which later became the venue of the first hear transplant surgery in India and the first Left Ventricular Assist Device implantation in Asia. The centre now handles around 3500 open heart surgical procedures annually.

== First heart transplant ==
The Organ Transplant Bill 1994 was passed in the Indian Parliament in May 1994 which legalized the organ transplants in India. The Bill was on the Table of the President of India for final approval when Venugopal led a team of doctors to perform the first successful on 3 August 1994. This was the first of the 26 heart transplant procedures performed by Venugopal.

== Controversies ==
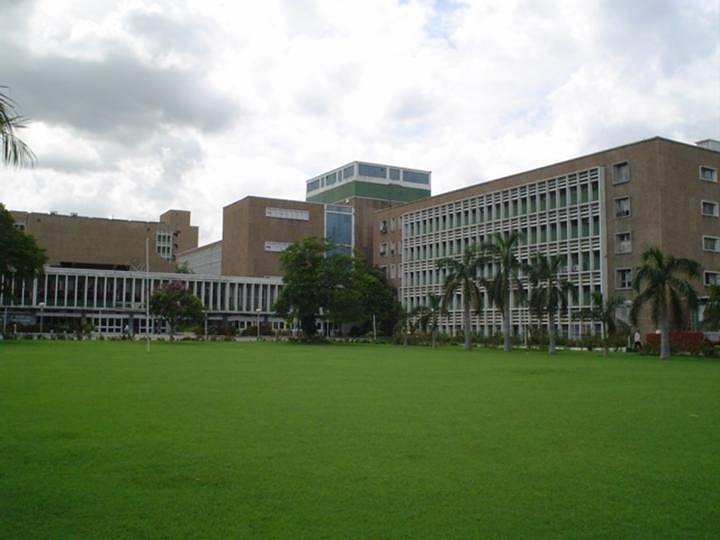
AIIMS Central lawn, with teaching block in the background

In the fag end of 2005 and at the beginning of 2006, about 200 faculty members, including 25 department heads, of AIIMS submitted their disapproval of Venugopal's way of functioning to the Union Minister of Health and Family Welfare of the Government of India. The protest intensified when, a batch of students marched to the office of the Director, resulting in the suspension of 6 of them, an act which had no precedent in the institute. The main argument of the faculty and the students that the hike in charges implemented by the Director went against the mandate of AIIMS.

Further, the grouse of the faculty was also aimed at the appointment of Venugopal, at the age of 61 and already past the retirement age, as the Director of the institute, with a clause to retain him for the next 5 years and until further orders. The move was reported to have shut out the chances of 6 senior faculty members. They were also against the Director holding two posts of the Head of the Cardiovascular Sciences Centre and the Head of Cardothoracic and Vascular Surgery as the posts required full-time attention. On 29 November 2007, Professor venugopal was removed in favor of Prof. T D Dogra, an authority on Forensic Medicine., by an order from the Union Minister of Health and Family Welfare, Anbumani Ramadoss, the reason reported to be Venugopal's open criticism of the Union Government.

The Health and Family Welfare ministry, it was reported, was not happy with Venugopal's handling of the quota issue where the Government planned to reserve 50 per cent of the university seats for the socially under-privileged, a move Venugopal was said to have countered using student sentiments. He moved to the Supreme Court and was reinstated for a period 45 days in summer vacation of 2008 before his retirement.

The Ministry had appointed M. S. Valiathan, the noted cardiothoracic surgeon, to report on the functioning of AIIMS and make recommendations on improvements. Venugopal was reported to be unhappy about the Ministry's intervention in the functioning of AIIMS and contested the termination at the Supreme Court of India, by way of a writ petition, on which the Court passed an interim order on 7 July 2006, staying the termination, till the validity of the decision was assessed. After a protracted legal battle, the Supreme Court, reinstated Venugopal, on 8 April 2008., terming the Government act as malafide and unconstitutional.

== Positions ==
- Professor – All India Institute of Medical Sciences, New Delhi
- Head of the Department – All India Institute of Medical Sciences, New Delhi
- Chief – All India Institute of Medical Sciences, New Delhi
- Dean – All India Institute of Medical Sciences, New Delhi
- Director – All India Institute of Medical Sciences, New Delhi
- Member – Advisory Panel of Experts for Quality Assurances in Health Care - Ministry of Health and Family Welfare, Government of India

== Awards and recognitions ==
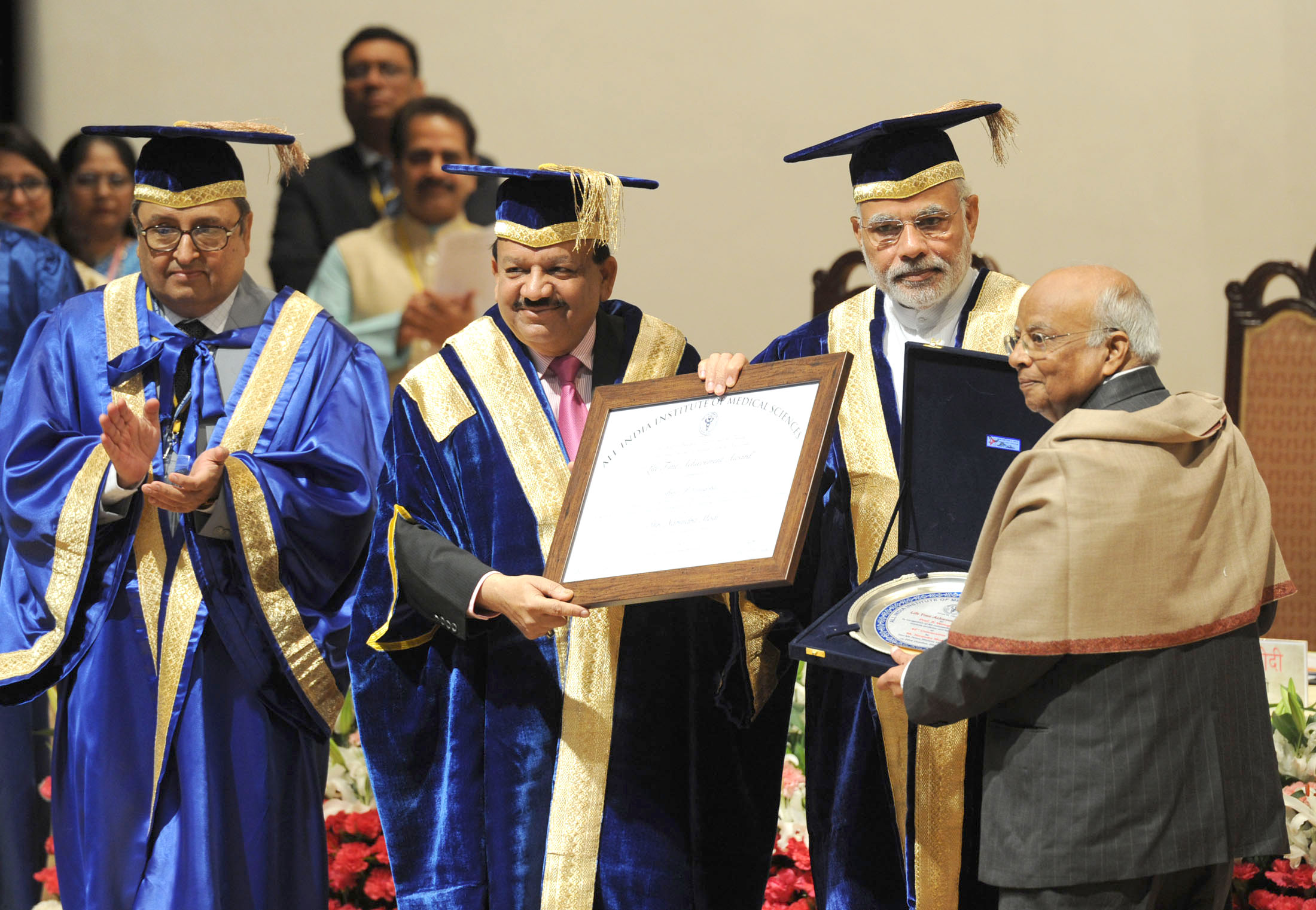
Narendra Modi presenting the lifetime achievement award to Dr. P. Venugopal, at the 42nd Convocation of the All India Institute of Medical Sciences, New Delhi, in 2014.

Academic recognitions

1. Gold Medal for the Best Undergraduate – All India Institute of Medical Sciences, New Delhi – 1963
2. Gold Medal for the Merit of First Order – All India Institute of Medical Sciences, New Delhi – 1967
3. Honoris Causa Doctor of Science (DSc) – Dr. NTR University of Health Sciences
4. Honoris Causa Doctor of Science (DSc) – Rajasthan University of Health Sciences

Social recognitions

1. Padma Bhushan – Government of India – 1998
2. Dr. B. C. Roy Award
3. All India Institute of Medical Sciences Lifetime Award for service of humanity – 2014
4. Sivananda Eminent Citizen Award - Sanathana Dharma Charitable Trust - 2010
5. Indira Priyadarsini Award – 1994
6. Goyal Prize – Kurukshetra University – 1994
7. Vijay Ratna Award – India International Friendship Society – 1994
8. Award of Excellence – Rajiv Gandhi Foundation – 1994
9. Dr. N. C. Joshi Memorial Oration Award – 1995
10. Dr. Jal R. Vakil Memorial Award – 1996
11. Dr. Pinnamaneni and Mrs Sithadevi Award – 1997
12. Rashtra Ratan Award – Vishwa Jagriti Mission, Yuva Manch – 2000
13. Dhanvantari Award – Dhanvantari Medical Foundation, Mumbai – 2010
14. Life Time Achievement Award – Heart Care Foundation, Kochi – 2010
15. Great Achiever of India Award – 1994
16. Manav Sewa Award – 1994
17. Shresht Shree Award
18. Dr. K. Sarom Cardiology Excellence Award
19. Ratna Shiromani Award

== Writings ==
Personal memoirs, 'Heartfelt: A Cardiac Surgeon's Pioneering Journey' published by HarperCollins, 2023. Co-authored by Priya Sarkar.

- Sunil P. Shenoy; Prashanth K. Marla; P. Venugopal; Karunakara K. Adappa; Trivikrama Padur Tantry; Murali Shankar; Guruprasad D. Rai (2011). "An Endoscopic Study of the Lacuna Magna and Reappraisal of Its Clinical Significance in Contemporary Urological Practice". Urology. 78 (5): 1009–1015. doi:10.1016/j.urology.2011.05.013. PMID 21777960. Archived from the original on 24 June 2016.
- Sandeep Chauhan; Bisoi Akshay Kumar; Beeraka Heramba Rao; Marigaddi Sanjeeva Rao; Bharat Dubey; Nita Saxena; Panangipalli Venugopal (2010). "Efficacy of Aprotinin, Epsilon Aminocaproic Acid, or Combination in Cyanotic Heart Disease". Annals of Thoracic Surgery.
- Harpreet Wasir; Anil Bhan; Shiv Kumar Choudhary; Rajesh Sharma; Sandeep Chauhan; Panangipalli Venugopal (2010). "Pretreatment of human myocardium with adenosine". European Journal of Cardio-Thoracic Surgery.
- R. Attia; P. Venugopal; D. Whitaker; C. Young (2010). "Management of a pulsatile mass coming through the sternum. Pseudoaneurysm of ascending aorta 35 years after repair of tetralogy of Fallot". Interactive Cardiovascular and Thoracic Surgery. 10 (5): 820–822. doi:10.1510/icvts.2009.227900. PMID 20051449.
- Rajiv Agrawal; Panangipalli Venugopal; Anil Bhan; Shiv Kumar Choudhary; Alok Mathur; Rajesh Sharma; Manoranjan Sahoo (2010). "Surgical myocardial revascularization without cardiopulmonary bypass". Annals of Thoracic Surgery. Archived from the original on 24 June 2016.

== See also ==
- Heart transplant surgery
- All India Institute of Medical Sciences
- Stem cell therapy
