= Mohammed Akhtaruzzaman =

Mohammed Akhtaruzzaman may refer to:

- Mohammed Akhtaruzzaman (judge)
- Mohammed Akhtaruzzaman (historian)
- Mohammad Akhtaruzzaman (politician)
- M. Akhtaruzzaman (1933–2010), scientist

== See also ==
- Akhtaruzzaman (disambiguation)
