= Akhtaruzzaman =

Akhtaruzzaman (Bengali: আখতরুজ্জমান, romanized: Ôkhtôrujjômān, lit. 'Star of the Era') is a Bengali masculine given name of Persian origin and may refer to:

== Given name ==
- Akhteruzzaman Elias (1943–1997), Bangladeshi novelist
- Akhtaruzzaman Chowdhury Babu (1945–2012), Bangladeshi politician from Chittagong
- Akhtaruzzaman (director) (1946–2011), Bangladeshi film director
- Akhtaruzzaman Ranjan (born 1947), retired Bangladesh Army Major
- Akhtaruzzaman (politician) (born 1953), Bangladeshi politician from Gazipur
- Akhteruzzaman Babul (1955–2019), Bangladeshi politician from Faridpur
- Akhtaruzzaman Mia, (born 1957) Bangladeshi politician from Dinajpur
- Akhteruzzaman Babu (born 1968), Bangladeshi businessman and politician from Khulna
- Akhtaruzzaman Alamgir, Bangladeshi politician from Patuakhali

== See also ==
- Mohammed Akhtaruzzaman (disambiguation)
- Akhtar
- Zaman (disambiguation)
- Zaman Akhter, English cricketer
