= Journal of Drug Targeting =

- Discipline: Pharmaceutical science
- Language: English
- Edited by: Saghir Akhtar

Publication details
- History: 1993-present
- Publisher: Informa
- Frequency: 10/year
- Impact factor: 4.5 (2022)

Standard abbreviations
- ISO 4: J. Drug Target.

Indexing
- CODEN: JDTAEH
- ISSN: 1061-186X (print); 1029-2330 (web)
- LCCN: 97661035
- OCLC no.: 25218475

Links
- Journal homepage; Online access; Online archive

Journal of Drug Targeting is a peer-reviewed medical journal published by Informa that covers research on all aspects of drug delivery and drug targeting for molecular and macromolecular drugs. The editor in chief is Saghir Akhtar (College of Medicine, Qatar University).

== Abstracting and indexing ==
The journal is abstracted and indexed in BIOBASE/Current Awareness in Biological Sciences, BIOSIS Previews, Chemical Abstracts Service, Current Contents/Life Sciences, EMBASE/Excerpta Medica, Index Medicus/MEDLINE, Science Citation Index, and Scopus.
