= Safa Kadal =

Safa Kadal (Urdu pronunciation: [səfɑː kəd̪əl] ; Kashmiri pronunciation: [safaː kəd̪ɨl]), also spelled Safakadal is an old neighborhood in the city of Srinagar in Jammu and Kashmir, India. The word kadal means bridge in Kashmiri. The Jhelum river flows under the eponymous Safa Kadal bridge which was constructed by Saif Khan during the reign of Mughal emperor Aurangzeb. An important Hindu temple in the locale, the Ram Mandir, was set to be renovated in January 2022. It was vandalised in 1990.
