= Saghir Akhtar =

Qatari chemist

- Education: Leicester School of Pharmacy (BSc): University of Bath (PhD)
- Known for: Editor in chief of the Journal of Drug Targeting
- Awards: Eli Lilly Award in Pharmaceutical Sciences
- Scientific career
- Fields: Chemistry
- Workplaces: Qatar University

Saghir Akhtar is professor of pharmacology in the College of Medicine, Qatar University, and editor in chief of the Journal of Drug Targeting.

== Early life and education ==
Akhtar obtained a First Class honours degree in Pharmacy from the Leicester School of Pharmacy and his PhD degree from the University of Bath.

== Academic career ==
From 1990 to 1991, he held a post-doctoral fellowship at University of North Carolina Medical School at Chapel Hill. He began his independent academic career at Aston University, firstly as lecturer from 1991 to 1997 and then as Reader in Pharmaceutical Sciences from 1997 to 1999. He led a team studying DNA chip technology with a hope of combatting a form of brain cancer known as glioma. In 1997, he was a visiting fellow with Ed Southern in the Department of Biochemistry at Oxford University. He later became professor of Drug Delivery in the Welsh School of Pharmacy and Director for the Centre for Genome-based Therapeutics, Cardiff University, UK (2002–2006). More recently he was Professor of Pharmacology at Kuwait University Faculty of Medicine (2007-2017) where he also served as director of the graduate program.

He is the winner of the Lilly Prize (1996), the Pfizer Academic Award (1997), the British Pharmaceutical Conference Science Medal (1998), the Controlled Release Society (USA) Young Investigator Research Achievement Award (2001) and the Kappa Society Science Award (2005).

His current research interests include studying molecular pharmacology and signal transduction pathways involved in diabetes and/or hypertension-induced cardiovascular dysfunction, and understanding the biological and pharmaceutical challenges associated with the development of gene silencing nucleic acids (RNA interference/ siRNA/ antisense oligonucleotides) as potential therapeutic agents; and c) studying the toxicogenomics of novel drugs and non-viral drug delivery systems. Akhtar has also provided health advice for fasting during Ramadan.
