= Akhtar Usman =

Pakistani poet

- Born: April 4, 1969 (age 57); Islamabad, Pakistan
- Occupations: Poet, critic, columnist, writer
- Awards: President's Award for Pride of Performance (2026); Ahmad Faraz Lifetime Achievement Award; Khalid Ahmad Award; Adab Sitara (literary star) by Halqa-i-Arbab-i-Zauq

Akhtar Usman (born Akhtar Mehmood; 4 April 1969 in Islamabad) is a Pakistani poet, critic, columnist and writer. He is known for his poems on non-traditional subjects. He has written extensively in multiple languages, including English, Persian, Urdu, Potohari, Punjabi, and Hindi. His works span across various genres such as Ghazal, Nazm, and poem. His published books of poetry include Ashk Aabad, Charagh Zaar, Kuchh Bacha Laye Hain, Sitara Saz, and Tarash.

== Early life ==
Usman was born on 4 April 1969 in Islamabad and spent his childhood in Rawalpindi. During his intermediate studies in 1985, he was mentored by Dr. Ehsan Akbar, who introduced him to Halqa-e-Arbab-e-Zauq, a prominent literary organization. He later served as Secretary General of the Halqa. Usman initially entered government service but retired on medical grounds in 1997. Following his retirement, he began writing for various newspapers and subsequently served as an editorial in-charge.

His ancestral family roots lie in Dera Ghazi Khan.

== Literary career ==
Akhtar Usman is known for a poetic style influenced by social realism, with a focus on themes such as working-class life, rural hardship, and political disillusionment. His poetry often addresses social and economic issues and depicts everyday experiences drawn from contemporary Pakistani society. Critics have noted that his work differs from more romantic or nostalgic trends in modern Urdu poetry and situates itself within a tradition of socially engaged verse associated with poets such as Habib Jalib and Faiz Ahmed Faiz.

His first poetry collection, Baraad, received critical attention and established him as a poet concerned with social realities. He has since published several additional collections, continuing to explore similar themes. Usman is known for his poems on unconventional themes. He has written extensively in Urdu, Persian, Pothohari, Punjabi and English. He has also written in many genres including ghazal and nazm. Although his work has been discussed by critics, Usman has largely remained outside mainstream literary circles, a position that commentators have sometimes attributed to broader dynamics within literary institutions rather than to the reception of his poetry itself.

=== Critical appreciation ===
Akhtar Usman's poetry has been described by critics as engaging with the relationship between tradition and modernity through a socially realist lens, "a poet whose poetry pronounces an epistemic rupture with tradition without falling prey to subjective idealism or the absolute materialism of Feuerbach." His work emphasizes themes of social justice, human agency, and collective transformation, and is often situated within the tradition of socially engaged Urdu poetry. Rather than focusing on romantic or metaphysical motifs, his poetry addresses contemporary social realities and the conditions of marginalized communities. Commentators have noted that while Usman draws on classical Urdu aesthetics and form, he departs from transcendental or metaphysical interpretations of creativity associated with poets such as Allama Iqbal, instead emphasizing transformation through human action and historical change. His work has also been discussed in relation to dialectical and materialist ideas, reflecting an engagement with modern social theory. Formally, Usman has experimented with combining blank verse, ghazal, and nazm within single poems, particularly in his collections Sitara Saz and Tarash, a stylistic approach that critics have identified as a distinctive feature of his poetry.

== Books ==
Several books of Akhtar Usman's poetry have been published. His notable works include:

- Akhtar Usman (2007). Kuchh Bacha Laye Hain.
- Akhtar Usman (2012). Sitara Saz.
- Akhtar Usman (2017). Charagh Zaar. Published in 2017 by Rumail House of Publications, Rawalpindi. It consists mostly of ghazal, one of the most popular genres.
- Akhtar Usman (2018). Tarash.
- Akhtar Usman (2022). Ashk Aabad.

== Awards and honors ==
Usman's work has been critically reviewed by Halqa-e Arbab-e Zauq, which is known for its tradition of literary criticism. The organization recognized Usman as its Adab Satara (literary star) and praised his poetry and critical skills. His literary approach, which encompasses a global perspective, has been appreciated for enriching discussions at constituency meetings.

He has received several awards, including the "Ahmad Faraz Lifetime Achievement Award" and the "Khalid Ahmad Award" for his book Chiraagh Zaar (2017).

In 2026, he received the President's Award for Pride of Performance in the field of literature, for research and poetry. The award was announced on 14 August 2025 and conferred by the President of Pakistan on 23 March 2026.
