= Akhtar Payami =

Pakistani journalist and poet (1931–2013)

Akhtar Payami (1931 – 8 April 2013) was an Indian–Pakistani journalist, poet and writer. He served as the editor of Dawn and Morning News. He is elder brother of Jabir Husain, former politician and writer.

== Early life ==
Payami was born as Syed Sayeed Akhtar in February 1931 at Rajgir, Nalanda, India.

He received his Bachelor of Arts degree in economics from Patna University.

== Literary works ==
- Aina Khanae
- Payami, Akhtar (1999). Husain, Jabir (ed.). Kalaas: Akhtar Payami Ki Nazmein [Kalas: Poems of Akhtar Payami] (in Urdu). Urdu Markaz.
- Payami, Akhtar (1996). Husain, Jabir (ed.). تاريخ: ايک تمثيلى مطم [History: An Allegorical Conclusion] (in Urdu). Patna: Urdu Markaz.
- Daudi, Obaidur Rahman (2008). Life and Times of Maulana Shafi Daudi: A Valiant Freedom Fighter : Re-visited After Sixty Years of Independence. Zain Publications.
