= Abu Khalil al-Madani =

Member of al-Qaeda

Abu Khalil al-Madani was a member of al-Qaeda's Shura Council. Believed to be a Saudi, little was known about his views, however in a 2013 audio message released online, he repeated familiar Al Qaeda themes of the Muslim world being weakened by a lack of Islamic faith and American conspiracies. In April 2014, al-Madani released an audio statement attempting to mediate the conflict between Syrian-based Jihadist groups, Al-Nusra Front and the Islamic State of Iraq and the Levant.

Al-Qaeda leader Ayman al-Zawahiri announced al-Madani's death in an audio message in August 2017.
