= Sheikh Fateh =

Pakistani leader of al-Qaeda (died 2010)

Sheikh Mohammad Fateh al Masri (Urdu: شیخ فتحی) was a leader of al-Qaeda in Afghanistan and Pakistan, referred to by the group as Khorasan, who replaced Mustafa Abu al-Yazid after the latter was killed in May 2010. On September 28 of the same year, it was reported that Sheikh Fateh al Masri was killed by a US drone attack in North Waziristan, Pakistan.
