= Akhtar Bibi =

Pakistani politician

Akhtar Bibi is a Pakistani politician who has been a Member of the National Assembly of Pakistan since 2024.

== Political career ==
In the 2024 Pakistani general election, she secured a seat in the National Assembly of Pakistan through a reserved quota for women as a candidate of Pakistan Muslim League (N) (PML).
