= Abu-Zaid al Kuwaiti =

Kuwaiti al-Qaeda member

- Khalid Bin Abdul Rehman Al-Hussainan (خالد بن عبد الرحمن الحسينان)
- Born: 1965 or 1966; Kuwait
- Died: December 6, 2012 (aged 46); North Waziristan, Pakistan
- Cause of death: Drone strike
- Organization: Al-Qaeda
- Known for: Possible heir to Ayman al-Zawahiri

Abu-Zaid al Kuwaiti (born Khalid Bin Abdul Rehman Al-Hussainan (Arabic: خالد بن عبد الرحمن الحسينان); 1965 or 1966 – December 6, 2012 (Note: United Press International reports that he died on Friday, December 7, 2012, but this disagrees with the other better sources cited here.)) was a high-ranking member of Al-Qaeda, and was considered a potential successor to Ayman al-Zawahiri, the head of the Salafist jihad group. Abu-Zaid was killed in a drone strike in Pakistan.

== Biography ==
Abu-Zaid al Kuwaiti was born in Kuwait in either 1965 or 1966. At one point, he was an imam in the Kuwait Ministry of Awqaf and Islamic Affairs. He became affiliated with the Al-Qaeda jihadist group and a member of their Islamic study committee, eventually joining the top tier of leaders. Since the death of Abu Yahya al Libi earlier in 2012, Abu-Zaid was regarded as Al Qaeda's top religious scholar, appearing in many videos teaching Islam.

Abu Zaid was considered a potential heir to the organization, and accordingly became a high-value target for the United States and Pakistani government. He was killed in a drone attack while eating breakfast (Suhur) (Note: AFP reports that he was eating dinner after a day of fasting rather than breakfast before a day of fasting.) near Mir Ali in Pakistan, and Al-Qaeda acknowledged his death three months later. He was 46 years old when he was killed. NBC News journalist and United States Department of Justice consultant Evan Kohlmann commented on his death in an interview with NBC. “That's a big gap in the leadership. He was the last senior Al-Qaida leader in the Afghanistan-Pakistan area who was, one, from the Arabian Peninsula and, two, who had serious clerical credentials. Now there is no obvious publicly recognizable candidate left to succeed Zawahiri.”

Abu Zaid has been honored as a martyr by al Qaeda, Ansar al-Sharia in Tunisia, and Seifallah Ben Hassine.
