= Irfan Husain =

Pakistani newspaper columnist and civil servant (1944–2020)

- Born: 5 July 1944; Amritsar, Punjab, British India
- Died: 16 December 2020 (aged 76); Dorset, England
- Occupations: Journalist, newspaper columnist, author of books
- Spouses: Ferida Sher; Charlotte Breese
- Father: Akhtar Husain Raipuri

Irfan Husain (Urdu: عرفان حسین) (5 July 1944 – 16 December 2020) was a Pakistani newspaper columnist and civil servant.

He wrote weekly columns for Dawn newspaper. Husain wrote on a wide range of subjects for newspapers in Pakistan and elsewhere from 1970 onwards. As a civil servant, he used to write under a number of pseudonyms, including Mazdak.

== Personal life ==
=== Early life ===
Born in Amritsar, Punjab, British India, in 1944, Husain migrated to the newly created state of Dominion of Pakistan with his parents in 1947. His father, Dr Akhtar Husain Raipuri, was a Sanskrit scholar, a literary critic, and a short-story writer who received his PhD from Sorbonne University. His mother, Hameeda, was a writer as well, beginning her literary career late in life, after her husband's death in 1992.

=== Education ===
After attending primary school in Karachi's St. Patrick's High School, Husain spent three years studying at a high school in Paris. Returning to Pakistan, Husain finished his high school studies in Karachi, and went to Turkey on a scholarship to study chemical engineering at the Middle East Technical University. He left after a year. Returning to Karachi, he joined Karachi University where he completed a master's degree in economics in 1967.

== Career ==
Immediately after graduating in 1967, Husain joined Pakistan's civil service where he remained for the next 30 years, working in a wide variety of jobs, ranging from being on Prime minister Zulfikar Ali Bhutto's speech-writing team in the mid-1970s to being posted as Information minister at Pakistan's embassy in Washington during Benazir Bhutto's first government in 1989–90.

Husain took early retirement in 1997 to help set up and run the Textile Institute of Pakistan (TIP) as its first president.

Throughout his working life, Husain continued writing, and remained associated with Dawn on a freelance basis from 1991.

== Death ==
Husain revealed in August 2020 that he had been diagnosed with a rare type of cancer. "After nearly three years of this barrage, I must confess there are times I wish it would just end quietly without fuss. But then I look outside the window and see the flowers, trees and birds in our garden, and I am happy to be still alive," he wrote in a column.

Husain died in Dorset, England on 16 December 2020 of a rare type of cancer.

A noted Pakistani author, newspaper columnist and a filmmaker Javed Jabbar is reportedly quoted as saying, "He was thoroughly forthright, secular, cosmopolitan and liberal".

== Books ==
Fatal Faultlines: Pakistan, Islam and the West, publisher: Arc Manor, 2011. ISBN 978-1604504781.

The above book is about the post-9/11 world and tries to answer the often asked question by Americans, "Why do they hate us?"

== See also ==
- List of Pakistani journalists
