= Akhtar Jadoon =

Pakistani politician

Akhtar Hussain Jadoon (اختر حسین جدون) was the Minister for the Transport Department Government of Sindh, belonging to Pakistan Peoples Party. He graduated from Abdullah Haroon College, Karachi. He has been elected as a Member of Provincial Assembly (MPA), Provincial Assembly of Sindh, from PS-89 Karachi-I, Keamari, twice. He was one of the three Pakhtoon MPA's of Sindh elected in 2008 elections
