= Farman Ali Shinwari =

Pakistani Al-Qaeda commander

Farman Ali Shinwari was a Pakistani militant who was named the commander of al-Qaeda in Pakistan in April 2012. He belonged to Landi Kotal in Khyber Agency. Shinwari was a former member of Harkat-ul-Mujahideen and Harkat-ul-Jihad al-Islami. Shinwari had a Bachelor of Science degree and a master's degree in international relations (from the University of Peshawar), was computer literate and spoke English.

Shinwari was eventually killed in a drone strike in Pakistan.
