= Akhter-ul Alam =

Bangladeshi diplomat (died 2010)

- আখতার-উল আলম

Ambassador of Bangladesh to Bahrain
- In office 14 May 1992 – 24 July 1996
- Preceded by: Abdul Momen Chowdhury
- Succeeded by: Gyasuddin A. Chowdhury

Personal details
- Died: 24 June 2010 (aged 71) Dhaka, Bangladesh

Akhter-ul Alam (died on 24 June 2010) was a Bangladeshi journalist and diplomat. He served as an ambassador of Bangladesh to Bahrain during 1992–1996.

== Career ==
Alam wrote columns in the Daily Ittefaq under his pen name Lubdhok.
