= Akhtarul Wasey =

Indian scholar and academician (born 1951)

Professor Emeritus Akhtarul Wasey
- Born: 1 September 1951 (age 75); Aligarh, Uttar Pradesh, India
- Citizenship: India
- Occupation: Professor
- Years active: 1977-present
- Known for: Contribution to Islamic studies
- Title: Professor emeritus
- Awards: Padma Shri (2013); Fulbright Fellowship (2008)

Academic background
- Education: B. A. (Aligarh), 1971; B. Th. (Aligarh), 1975; M. Th. (Aligarh), 1976; M. A. (Aligarh), 1977; Diploma in Turkish Language, (Istanbul), 1983
- Alma mater: Aligarh Muslim University; Istanbul University
- Thesis: Education of Indian Muslims: A study of the All-India Muslim Educational Conference, 1886-1947 (1977)

Academic work
- Discipline: Islamic studies
- Institutions: Jamia Milia Islamia, New Delhi; National Commissioner for Linguistic Minorities in India

Akhtarul Wasey (born 1 September 1951) is an Indian scholar and academician, who serves as the president of Maulana Azad University, in Jodhpur, India. He formerly served as professor of Islamic Studies at Jamia Millia Islamia in New Delhi, where he remains professor emeritus in the Department of Islamic Studies.

== Early life and education ==
Wasey was born on 1 September 1951, in Aligarh, Uttar Pradesh to Hairat bin Wahid and Shahida Hairat. He is the oldest of six children. Wasey attended Primary School No. 16, the City High School of Aligarh Muslim University, and Aligarh Muslim University where he earned a Bachelor of Arts (Hons.) in Islamic studies in 1971, a Bachelor of Theology in 1975, a Master of Theology in 1976, and a Master of Arts in Islamic studies in 1977. He also completed a short-term course in the Turkish language from Istanbul University in 1983.

== Career ==
On 1 August 1980 he joined Jamia Millia Islamia, Delhi as lecturer and worked there till 31 August 2016. Wasey was a lecturer, reader and professor at Jamia Milia Islamia University in New Delhi from 1980 to 2016, serving as the director of Zakir Husain Institute of Islamic Studies and later becoming head of the Department of Islamic Studies and Dean of the Faculty of Humanities and Languages. He is currently the president of Maulana Azad University in Jodhpur and remains a professor emeritus in the Department of Islamic Studies at Jamia Millia Islamia.

In March 2014, Wasey was appointed by Indian President Shri Pranab Mukherjee to a three-year term as Commissioner for Linguistic Minorities in India, and became the first Urdu-speaking commissioner since 1957.

Wasey is the editor of four Islamic journals: Islam Aur Asr-e-Jadeed; Islam and the Modern Age; Risala Jamia; and Islam Aur Adhunik Yug.

== Awards and honors ==
- 1985 Award from Urdu Academy, Delhi and UP Urdu Academy on "Sir Syed Ki Taleemi Tehreek"
- 1996 Maulana Mohammad Ali Jauhar Award
- 2008 Fulbright Fellowship
- 2013 Padma Shri award from President Pranab Mukherjee of India
- 2014 Makhdoom Quli Medal from the President of Turkmenistan
- 2014 Daktur-e-Adab from Jamia Urdu, Aligarh
