= Akhtar Purvez =

Kashmiri American physician and researcher

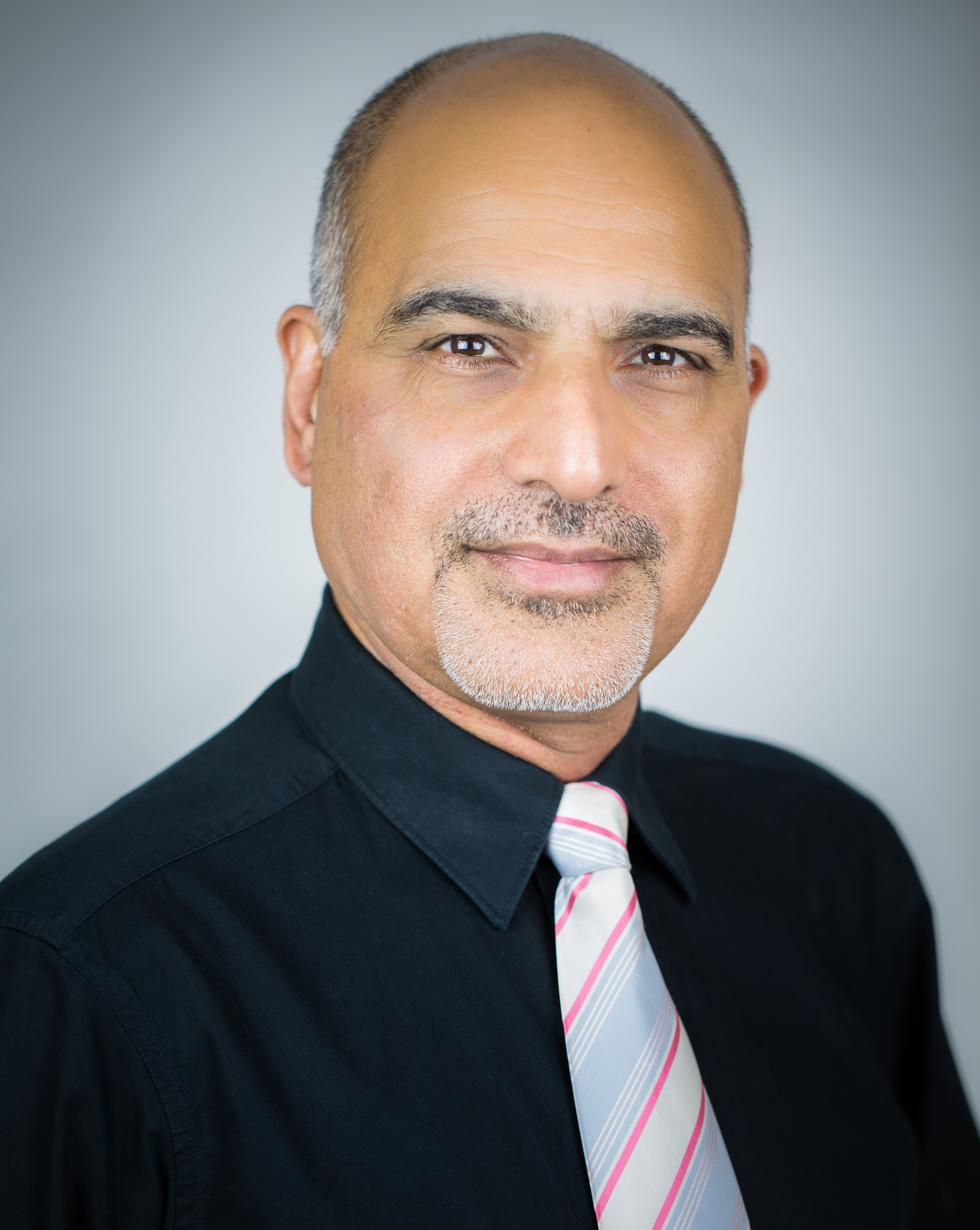
- Occupation: physician
- Known for: pain management, treating substance use disorder, promoting culture of Kashmir

Akhtar Purvez is a Kashmiri American author, physician and medical researcher specializing in pain management and substance use disorder. He serves as a principal investigator in clinical research. He has been featured in regional media for his work on chronic pain, substance misuse, and healthcare access in Kashmir.

== Personal life ==
Purvez grew up in Tangmarg in the erstwhile Jammu and Kashmir region of India. His father was the poet Muzaffar Aazim.

Purvez received a medical degree from the Government Medical College, Srinagar. He moved to the United States where he trained in anesthesiology at Boston Medical Center and in pain management at the University of Virginia.

== Advocacy ==
Purvez advocates for people in chronic pain to understand and be able to access appropriate and conventional medical treatment.

He promotes access to health care in Kashmir, including by making recommendations on addressing self-medication and substance abuse in pain management.

He has been profiled for his approach to pain management, which incorporates cultural and literary elements, including the use of poetry as a complementary perspective in patient care.

== Publications ==
- Managing Chronic Pain in an Age of Addiction, 2018
- The Brain Behind Pain: Exploring the Mind-Body Connection, 2022
