= Akhtar Hussain (sarangi player) =

Musician from Pakistan

- Born: 1959 (age 66–67); Hyderabad Deccan, India
- Citizenship: Pakistani
- Occupation: Sarangi player
- Children: Gul Mohammed Hussain (sarangi player)
- Relatives: Ghulam Mohammed Khan (1910 – 1974) (grandfather); A noted sarangi player of his time

Akhtar Hussain (born 1959) is a sarangi player from Karachi, Pakistan.

His grandfather, Ghulam Mohammed Khan (1910 – 1974), was associated with the court of the Nawab of Hyderabad Deccan and was highly regarded for his sarangi performances at private gatherings of the Nawab.

== Early life and family ==
Akhtar Hussain was born in 1959 in Hyderabad Deccan, India. His grandfather, Ghulam Mohammed Khan, had migrated to Faisalabad District in 1964 from Hyderabad Deccan and later moved to Lahore to work as a sarangi player at Radio Pakistan, Lahore, where he died in 1974. His grandson, Akhtar Hussain, later worked in Sindh province at Khairpur for Radio Pakistan as a contract musician for over 22 years, playing background sarangi for many folk dramas on radio. He later decided to move to Karachi in 2006 to settle there. He was hired by National Academy of Performing Arts (NAPA) in Karachi, where he started earning a reasonable income by playing sarangi.

Music critics often argue that sarangi, out of all bowed string instruments, is the closest to the human voice. They say that when played by a true maestro, sarangi can express the sadness one experiences in love.

In 2009, 50-year-old Akhtar Hussain was struggling through hard times and had taken shelter with his teenaged son in a small home at an imambargah in Karachi. He was not happy with the lack of support for classical musicians by the Government of Pakistan.

Akhtar Hussain's son, Gul Muhammad Hussain, also following the family tradition, became a sarangi player in Karachi, Pakistan and earns Rs. 20,000 a month.

In 2009, Akhtar Hussain revealed that he had been suffering from asthma for some time.

In 2023, Akhtar Hussain was rated as a 'stalwart' of the sarngi instrument in Pakistan.
