= Government Medical College, Srinagar =

Medical College and Hospital in Srinagar, India

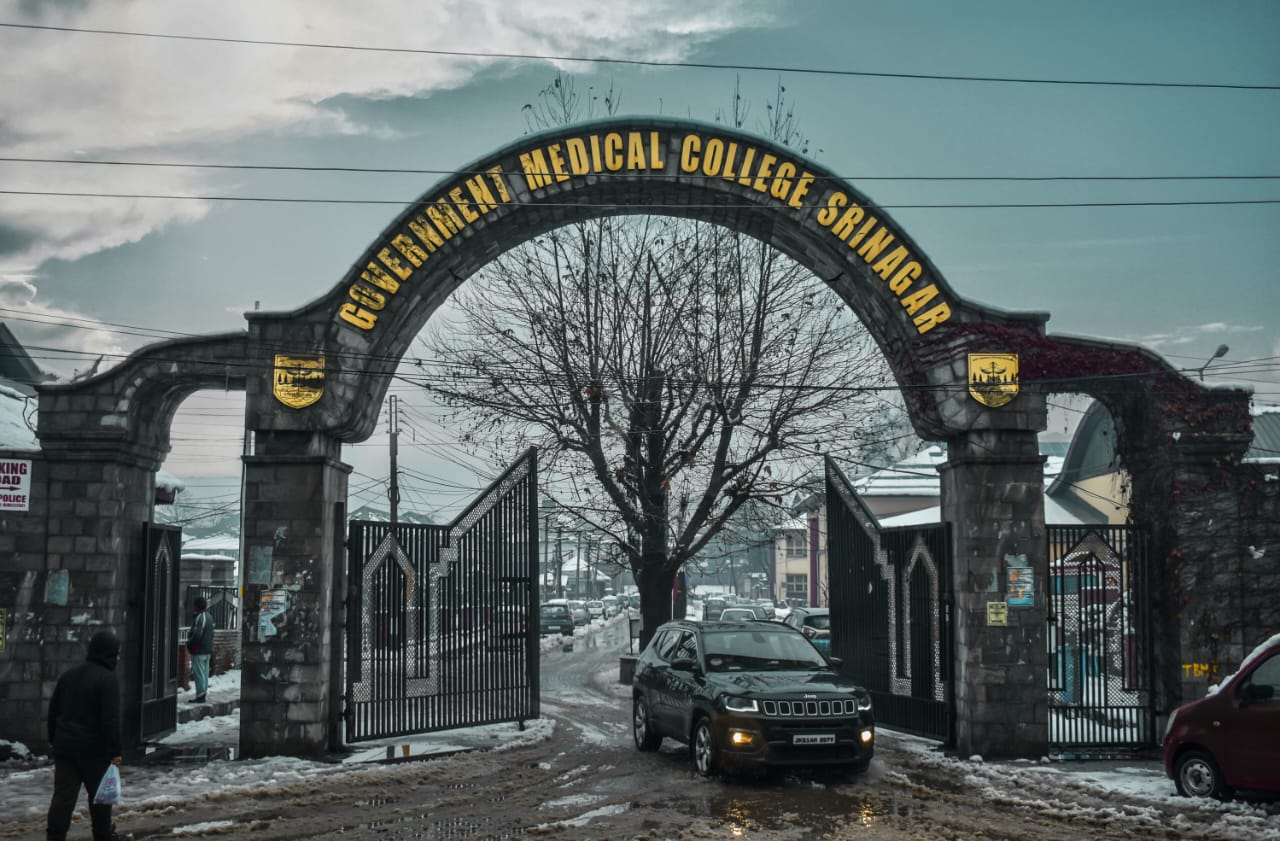
- GMC Srinagar main gate
- Latin: Imperium Medical Collegium Srinagar
- Motto: "Strive to Learn"
- Type: Medical college
- Established: 1959; 67 years ago
- Affiliations: National Medical Commission
- Academic affiliations: University of Kashmir
- Principal: Dr. Iffat Hassan Shah
- Students: 1560
- Undergraduates: 900
- Postgraduates: 570
- Location: Medical College Street, Karan Nagar, Srinagar, J&K, India; 34.0852°N 74.7997°E
- Campus: 50 acres (20 ha); Urban
- Language: Hindi, English, Urdu
- Nickname: GMCian
- Website: www.gmcs.edu.in

The Government Medical College, Srinagar (also known as GMC Srinagar) is a government medical college and hospital located in Srinagar, Jammu and Kashmir, India. It was established in 1959. It is the oldest medical college in Kashmir. The college and hospital are affiliated with the University of Kashmir and recognised by the Medical Council of India (currently National Medical Commission). The college is located in the Karan Nagar area of Srinagar, about 1.5 km (0.93 mi) from Lal Chowk. The girls' hostel is located within the campus but the boys' hostel is 2.7 km (1.7 mi) away. It has well-equipped labs. The selection to the college is done on the basis of merit through National Eligibility and Entrance Test. As of 2026, combined undergraduate intake stands at 250 seats per year.

== History ==
In the 1950s, the government of Jammu and Kashmir realised the need for a medical college in the state. The then Prime Minister of India, Jawaharlal Nehru, laid the foundation stone of the college on 13 June 1957. The college was established under the name of Jammu and Kashmir Medical College in 1959, and its first batch of students was admitted the same year. The college was initially located at the Shri Maharaja Hari Singh Hospital in the city of Srinagar. In 1962, the college was shifted to its present location at Karan Nagar in Srinagar, where it covers an area of around 100 acres. The college was renamed as Government Medical College Srinagar in 1970. In the same year, the college was affiliated with the University of Kashmir. In 1982, the first batch of postgraduate students was admitted to the college. In 1998, the college was granted recognition by the Medical Council of India (MCI) for undergraduate and postgraduate medical courses.

== Campus ==
The Government Medical College (GMC) Srinagar is located in the city of Srinagar in the Indian state of Jammu and Kashmir. The college covers an area of around 100 acres and is situated in the Karan Nagar area of the city.

Academic Blocks: The college has several academic blocks that house classrooms, laboratories, and libraries.

Auditorium: The college has an auditorium that can accommodate around 500 people. The auditorium is used for various academic and cultural events.

Sports Facilities: The college has a playground and facilities for outdoor sports such as basketball, while as cricket and football ground in the boys hostel campus.

== Associated hospitals ==
Currently there are eight associated hospitals of Government Medical College, Srinagar:

- Shri Maharaja Hari Singh Hospital (SMHS Hospital), also Known as Sadar Haspataal or Headwun
- G. B. Pant, Children Hospital, Bemina Srinagar (Bache Haspataal)
- Lal Ded Maternity Hospital, Hazuri Bag Srinagar (LD Haspatal)
- Psychiatric Diseases Hospital, Srinagar (Mental Haspatal)
- Chest Diseases Hospital Dalgate, Srinagar (Durgjan Haspatal)
- Bone and Joint Hospital Barzulla, Srinagar
- Chitranjan Mobile Hospital
- Superspeciality Hospital, Shireen Bagh

== Alumni and faculty ==
- Rafiq Ahmad Pampori (former principal)
- Akhtar Purvez (alumni)

== See also ==
- Government Medical Colleges in Jammu and Kashmir
