= Akhtar Hussain (umpire) =

Pakistani cricket umpire (died 1973)

Personal information
- Died: 24 August 1973; Lahore, Pakistan

Umpiring information
- Tests umpired: 3 (1959–1969)
- Source: Cricinfo, 1 July 2013

Akhtar Hussain (date of birth unknown, died 24 August 1973) was a Pakistani cricket umpire. He stood in three Test matches between 1959 and 1969. The Second Test of Pakistan's home series against New Zealand in 1969–70 was the last Test Akhtar Hussain officiated.

== See also ==
- List of Test cricket umpires
