= Akhtar Husain =

Pakistani scholar

- Born: 1912; Raipur, British India
- Died: 1992 (aged 79–80)
- Education: University of Paris (PhD)

Akhtar Husain (1912-1992, Urdu: اختر حسین) also known as Dr Akhtar Husain Raipuri was a Pakistani scholar, journalist and lexicographer. He authored the book Gard-e-Raah, which was translated into English as The Dust of the Road: A Translation by Amina Azfar, many years after his death.

== Early life ==
Akhtar Husain was born in the district of Raipur in the British India, now within the state of Chhattisgarh, Republic of India. He was born to Saiyyed Akbar Husain, an engineer stationed in Raipur. His mother Mumtazunnisa was a publisher in women's journals. She died at age twenty-six when Akhtar was just three.

As a child, Akhtar became fond of reading and saved money to buy books in Hindi (a major register of Hindustani written in the Devanagari script), but could not read Urdu (another major register of Hindustani written in the Perso-Arabic script) as fluently. At age twelve, his school teacher asked him to help organize the school library, and his command over Hindi was so strong that, apart from reading it, he began writing in the language, and "his first story “Parajit” (Defeated) was published in Madhuri, a reputed literary journal, when he was only 16 years old."

Outside Urdu and Hindi, he is reported to have been proficient in Sanskrit, Bengali, Persian, English, and French. Later in life, he also acquired knowledge of Spanish.

== Education and career ==
In order to pursue further education, Husain moved to Calcutta, which at the time was also a major center for publication in Bengali, Hindi and Urdu. But after leaving there in 1932, Husain went on to translate popular works of Bengali poet Qazi Nazrul Islam into Urdu. According to Husain, Babu Moolchand and Maulvi Abdul Huq were his two major life influences.

He also became acquainted with friends with the poets Saghar Nizami and Majaz Nizami. Huq upon reading Husain's works encouraged him to increase his attention to literature rather than journalism. Huq encouraged Husain to assist him in the development of an English–Hindi dictionary and the publication of the Urdu journal. After Husain agreed, the two of them moved to Aurangabad where they started Anjuman-i Taraqqi-i Urdu and worked for about two years. During that time, Husain also reviewed Urdu books under the pseudonym "Nakhuda". Over this time bonds between Husain and Abdul Haq.

By 1935, Husain married Hamida, daughter of police officer and crime fiction novelist Zafar Omar. Akhtar Husain witnessed the historic 1936 meeting of Sahitya Parishad in which Mahatma Gandhi declared that Hindi rather than Hindustani (which includes Urdu and technically Caribbean Hindustani as well) be the national language of India upon independence.

Upon this, Haq stopped all his works in Hindi, including the development of the English-Hindi dictionary, and Husain left Aurangabad for Delhi where he had difficulty settling for a career as a result of his application being rejected.

He then applied to Sorbonne where he pursued a PhD in ancient life in the Indian subcontinent based on Sanskrit texts. His thesis adviser was Marc Bloch. He also briefly worked as a translator to support himself financially. He also later worked in news bulletins to write news analysis. He also worked with the Radio's Dictionary Committee.

By 1942, Husain became Muhammadan Anglo-Oriental College, Amritsar. Mutually, he also translated a three volume autobiography of Gorky. He also continued to write short stories (Zindagi ka Mela). By 1945, Husain worked as an assistant in the education department at Simla, where he also got the opportunity to work for Maulana Abul Kalam Azad.

== Independence and the end of British Rule ==
Within two years of the end of the Second World War and the end of the British Raj, Husain and his family relocated to Karachi, Sindh, Pakistan. It was around this time it was reported that violence between Brahmins and Muslims intensified.

In Pakistan, Husain continued working in the educational fields, where he worked as secretary. Dissatisfied with the political direction Pakistani society had headed for, he took up a job at UNESCO, working there until he retired in 1972.

== Bibliography ==
Some of his major works include:

- La société dans le drame sanscrit. PhD thesis written in French for the Sorbonne, in 1939, 'on the society in Sanskrit drama'.
- Adab aur inqilāb. A critical study on prominent Urdu authors and their works.
- Ḥabash aur At̤āliyah. History of Italy and Ethiopia.
- Payām-i shabāb. Translation of Bengali poetry from Kazi Nazrul Islam.
- Roshan mīnār : tanqīdī maẓāmīn kā majmūʻah. Essays on Urdu literature.
- Tāsh ke patte. Urdu translation from the English of James Hadley Chase's The Joker in the Pack.
- Śakuntalā. Urdu translation from the Sanskrit of Kālidāsa's Śakuntalā.
