= Adam Yahiye Gadahn =

American Al-Qaeda member (1978–2015)

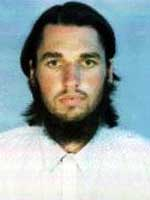

Personal details
- Born: Adam Pearlman; September 1, 1978 Oregon, U.S.
- Died: January 19, 2015 (aged 36) Waziristan, Pakistan
- Cause of death: Drone strike
- Height: 5 ft 11 in (1.80 m)
- Occupation: Al-Qaeda operative
- Known for: Member of al-Qaeda/FBI's most wanted

Military service
- Allegiance: Al-Qaeda
- Branch/service: Al-Qaeda central (1998–2015)
- Years of service: 1998–2015
- Rank: Advisor to Osama bin Laden
- Battles/wars: Afghan Civil War; War in Afghanistan; War in North-West Pakistan †

Adam Yahiye Gadahn (Arabic: آدم يحيى غدن, Ādam Yaḥyā Ghadan; September 1, 1978 – January 19, 2015) was an American senior operative, cultural interpreter, spokesman and media advisor for the Islamist group al-Qaeda, as well as a noise musician. Beginning in 2004, he appeared in a number of videos produced by al-Qaeda as "Azzam the American" ('Azzām al-Amrīki, Arabic: عزام الأمريكي), sometimes transliterated as Ezzam Al-Amrikee). Gadahn, who converted to Islam in 1995 at a California mosque, was described as "homegrown," a term used by scholars and government officials for Western citizens "picking up the sword of the idea" (in the words of one FBI agent) to commit attacks in the West. American intelligence officials allege that he inspired the September 6, 2007, Osama bin Laden video.

In 2004, he was added to the FBI Seeking Information – War on Terrorism list. On October 11, 2006, he was removed from that list, and placed on the Bureau of Diplomatic Security Rewards for Justice Program list of wanted criminals. On the same day, Gadahn was indicted based on the testimony of the FBI case agent E. J. Hilbert II, in the Southern Division of the United States District Court for the Central District of California by a federal grand jury for the capital crime of treason for aiding an enemy of the United States, the first such case since the 1950s. On January 19, 2015, Gadahn was killed in one of a series of unmanned aircraft strikes in Waziristan, Pakistan. Al-Qaeda confirmed Gadahn's death on June 25, 2015.

== Early life and education ==
Gadahn was born on September 1, 1978, in Oregon, United States. Gadahn's paternal grandfather, Carl Pearlman, was a Jewish activist, urologist and on the board of directors of the Anti-Defamation League. Gadahn's paternal grandmother, Agnes Branch, a Christian, was an editor for The Christian Family Chronicles (a genealogical publication for people with the surname "Christian"). Gadahn's father is Philip, a musician who grew up in Orange County, California. Philip and his wife Jennifer legally changed their last name to Gadahn in the mid-1970s, after the Biblical warrior Gideon. Philip Gadahn was involved in the counterculture movement at the University of California at Irvine, and before Adam's birth became a Christian. Gadahn described his father as having been "raised agnostic or atheist, but he became a believer in One God when he picked up a Bible left on the beach." His father's religious perspective was flexible and based upon his own spiritual needs and as a new convert to Islam, Gadahn portrayed his father in a manner sympathetic to his religion of conversion.

Gadahn was raised a Protestant Christian, and homeschooled through high school by his parents on an isolated farm in western Riverside County, California. He played Little League baseball and participated in Christian homeschool support groups. As an adolescent he became very involved in the death metal community, making contact with fans and musicians through alternative magazines. During the summer of 1993, he formed an ambient noise project called Aphasia. Gadahn contributed music reviews and artwork to a zine called Xenocide, and his comments were published. A loyal fan of Carl Barks' tales of Scrooge McDuck, Gadahn submitted drawings of this character to Gladstone Publishing, whose editors did not publish them, but publicly thanked him for his efforts. In 1995, at age 16, Gadahn moved in with his grandparents in the West Floral Park neighborhood of Santa Ana, California. Not long after, he converted to Islam and lamented the estrangement his musical interest caused between him and his family writing, "My relationship with my parents became strained, although only intermittently so. I am sorry even as I write this."

== Conversion to Islam ==
Mugshot of Adam Gadahn after his arrest for assaulting Haitham Bundakji

While living with his grandparents in West Floral Park, Santa Ana, Gadahn described himself as having a "yawning emptiness", and he sought ways "to fill that void". He explored Christianity on the internet, radio, and locally, but later said that he found evangelical Christianity's "apocalyptic ramblings" to be "paranoid" and hollow. In 1995, at age 17, Gadahn began studying Islam at the Islamic Society of Orange County. Members of Gadahn's study group were young fundamentalists who "targeted the mosque's chairman, Haitham Bundakji", for his practice of "wearing Western clothes and being friendly with Jews".

Gadahn converted to Islam later that year, and shortly thereafter posted an essay to the University of Southern California website describing his conversion, titled "Becoming a Muslim". According to his parents, Adam was "arrested and convicted of assaulting his former mentor Haitham Bundakji in May 1997." He served two days in jail, but his failure to perform 40 hours of community service left a warrant for his arrest active.

Gadahn reportedly moved to Pakistan in 1998, where he married an Afghan refugee and maintained intermittent contact with his family until March 2001, when all contact with his family stopped. He told his parents he had been working as a journalist while in Pakistan—spending time in both Karachi and Peshawar—presumably a euphemism for his media propaganda efforts for al-Qaeda. He began supporting jihadi causes in the late 1990s.

== Al-Qaeda affiliation ==
In a short period of time, Gadahn became a senior advisor to bin Laden and was assumed to be playing the role of "translator, video producer, and cultural interpreter." Gadahn declared his animosity towards the United States by declaring it "enemy soil" and praising the individuals responsible for the September 11 attacks. The first production of al-Qaeda's media division, As-Sahab, was believed to have been in 2001 with the involvement of Gadahn. United States and British intelligence officials believe it to have been run by Gadahn, although it was reported that the media production of these messages had a notable decrease in quality, possibly due to Gadahn's involvement in other tasks for al-Qaeda.

The Federal Bureau of Investigation (FBI) announced that it wanted Gadahn for questioning in 2004, and on May 26, 2004, United States Attorney General John Ashcroft and FBI Director Robert Mueller announced that reports indicated that Gadahn was one of seven al-Qaeda members who were planning terrorist actions for the summer or fall of 2004. Gadahn's name was the only new name released by Mueller in this warning. Two of the other alleged terrorists named on that date were Ahmed Khalfan Ghailani and Fazul Abdullah Mohammed. Those two had been listed as FBI Most Wanted Terrorists since 2001, indicted for their roles in the 1998 U.S. embassy bombings. The others, Amer el-Maati, Aafia Siddiqui, Abderraouf Jdey, and Adnan Gulshair el Shukrijumah had all been on FBI wanted lists for some time. Jdey had been on the FBI's "Seeking Information" wanted list since January 17, 2002, to which Gadahn was added with the other three as well.

In a 2005 video, Gadahn threatened to attack Los Angeles, for which the United States Department of Justice "indicted him under seal for providing material support to Al Qaeda". As an introduction to the "An Invitation to Islam" video in 2006, Zawahiri encouraged westerners to heed Gadahn's message and praised Gadahn as "a perceptive person who wants to lead his people out of darkness into the light"; "Al Qaeda had never before given one of its members, let alone an American, an endorsement so intimate and direct." As a result of the contents of the "Invitation" video, he was charged with treason because "[h]e chose to join our enemy and to provide it with aid and comfort by acting as a propagandist for Al Qaeda," as Deputy Attorney General Paul McNulty explained. He was also placed on the FBI's most wanted list and a million dollar reward was offered for his capture. McNulty explained the severity of Gadahn's crimes: "Terrorists create fear and intimidation through extreme violence. They want Americans to live and walk in fear. They want to demoralize us. That’s why propaganda is so important to them, and why facilitating that propaganda is such an egregious crime."

On propaganda and terrorism, Gadahn criticized specific "jihadi" groups, such as Tehrik-i-Taliban, al-Shabaab, and the Islamic State, for the killing of Muslim non-combatant civilians, which he believed undermined Al-Qaeda's media strategy and objectives.

== Appearances in al-Qaeda videos ==
=== 2004–2006 ===
In late October 2004, ABC News broadcast a 75-minute videotape of a masked man who identified himself as "Azzam the American" threatening the United States with terrorist attacks. After the network played excerpts of the video, someone from one of Gadahn's mosques told law enforcement officials that he believed the man in the video was Gadahn.

In 2005, on the fourth anniversary of the September 11, 2001, attacks, an eleven-minute videotape message purportedly from al-Qaeda was broadcast on the ABC News program Good Morning America. The American English-accented speaker, a man whose face was partially concealed, was identified by U.S. intelligence officials as Gadahn. The speaker praised the "echo of explosions and the slitting of the throats of the infidels" and attacked U.S. foreign policy and military activity, particularly in Iraq and Afghanistan. He predicted that there would be future attacks in Los Angeles and Melbourne: "Yesterday, London and Madrid. Tomorrow, Los Angeles and Melbourne, God willing. At this time, don't count on us demonstrating restraint or compassion."

Around the same time, he appeared in an al-Qaeda-produced English-language documentary film Knowledge is for Acting Upon—The Manhattan Raid, a film which traces the organization from its genesis among the anti-Soviet Mujahideen in Afghanistan through its establishment of training camps around the world to its defining moment, the September 11, 2001, attacks on New York and Washington. Gadahn provides Western viewers with an expository look at the group's ideals, philosophy and goals as well as a retrospective look at their perspective on the geopolitical situations which led to their decision to execute the attack. The film culminates with Gadahn's description of the events' aftermath, pre-attack martyrdom videos filmed by the hijackers, and finally a montage of videos portraying the attacks themselves. The high-production-value film, completely captioned for both English and Arabic-speaking audiences, is widely regarded as a tool intended to motivate and attract other Western-born Muslims.

On July 7, 2006, Gadahn appeared unmasked on an al-Qaeda tape made public on the Internet. On the tape he denounced the United States military presence in Iraq as well as rapes and murders committed by American soldiers. Gadahn's family, who had previously said that they could not tell whether or not it was Gadahn who appeared in the al-Qaeda videos, did not respond to the new tape.

On September 2, 2006, a video called "An Invitation to Islam", features a lecture by Adam Gadahn for approximately 44 minutes of its 48 minutes, with a lesser part given to al-Qaeda theorist Ayman al-Zawahiri. In the video, Gadahn stated "If the Zionist crusader missionaries of hate and counter-Islam consultants like Daniel Pipes, Robert Spencer, Michael Scheuer, Steven Emerson, and yes, even the crusader-in-chief George W. Bush were to abandon their unbelief and repent and enter into the light of Islam and turn their swords against the enemies of God, it would be accepted of them and they would be our brothers in Islam." Both Pipes and Spencer have publicly declined to accept Gadahn's invitation to convert to Islam. Gadahn praised British politician George Galloway and journalist Robert Fisk for expressing their "respect and admiration for Islam" and for "acknowledging that it is the truth" and for "demonstrating their sympathy for Muslims their causes", but added "I say to them, isn't it time you stopped sitting on the fence and came over to the side of truth?" Gadahn urged American soldiers to "surrender to the truth", "escape from the unbelieving Army", and "join the winning side."

=== 2007–2008 ===
On May 29, 2007, Gadahn again made headlines when another video, "al-Qaeda Video Warning to US by American Adam Gadahn" was released on the Internet. In this video, Adam Gadahn listed five demands:

1. "Pull every last one of your soldiers, spies, security advisors, trainers, attachés, … out of every Muslim land from Afghanistan to Zanzibar ..."
2. End "all support and aid, military, political, economic, or otherwise, to the 56-plus apostate regimes of the Muslim world, and abandon them to their well-deserved fate ..."
3. "End all support, moral, military, economic, political, or otherwise, to the bastard state of Israel, and ban your citizens, Zionist Jews, Zionist Christians, and the rest from traveling to occupied Palestine or settling there. Even one penny of aid will be considered sufficient justification to continue the fight."
4. "... impose a blanket ban on all broadcasts to our region ..."
5. "Free all Muslim captives from your prisons, detention facilities, and concentration camps, regardless of whether they have been recipients of what you call a fair trial or not."

Gadahn then threatened that "your failure to heed our demands and the demands of reason means that you and your people will—Allah willing—experience things which will make you forget all about the horrors of September 11th, Afghanistan and Iraq".

American intelligence officials allege that Gadahn inspired bin Laden's September 2007 video, in which bin Laden, among other things, made reference to the subprime mortgage crisis. M.J. Gohel, chief executive of the Asia-Pacific Foundation, a London-based security-studies organization, found bin Laden's video "very reminiscent of [Gadahn's] messages in terms of style and content." Officials told reporters that the "high quality" of the English subtitles and the "references to Malcolm X" in al-Qaeda's 2008 post-presidential election video "reflect the influence" of Gadahn. In that video, Barack Obama is attacked as a "House Negro".

On October 4, 2008, a video featuring Gadahn was posted on Laura Mansfield's website. The 32-minute video primarily focused on Pakistan, but also referenced economic woes in the United States: "The enemies of Islam are facing a crushing defeat, which is beginning to manifest itself in the extending crisis their economy is experiencing. The crisis, whose primary cause, in addition to the abortive and unsustainable crusades they are waging in Afghanistan, Pakistan and Iraq, is they are turning their backs on Allah's revealed laws, which forbid interest-bearing transactions, exploitation, greed and injustice in all its forms and demand the worship of Allah alone to the exclusion of all false gods, including money and power."

=== 2009–2013 ===
In May 2009, Gadahn appeared in a new al-Qaeda video. On December 12, 2009, Gadahn, in another English-language video titled "The Mujahideen Don't Target Muslims", claimed that the organization was being framed by the United States and Pakistan, and blamed the media for helping implicate al-Qaeda in a recent deadly string of attacks in Pakistan that killed hundreds of civilians.

In a video released on March 7, 2010, Gadahn called on Muslims in the West to follow in the footsteps of Nidal Hasan, who committed the 2009 Fort Hood shooting. In the video, titled "A Call to Arms," Gadahn encouraged Americans and other Muslims in the West to "prepare to play his due role in responding to and repelling the aggression of the enemies of Islam." Gadahn also provided advice on choosing high-value targets for potential terrorist attacks in America and the West, such as military installations and mass transportation systems, as well as symbols of capitalism, whose ruin could cripple the Western economy. Gadahn urged his followers to take action as soon as possible, explaining that "now" is the "golden, once in a lifetime opportunity to reap the rewards of jihad and martyrdom…so unsheath your sharpened sword and rush to take your rightful place among defiant champions of Islam."

On June 21, 2010, a video press release was made in which Gadahn delivered guidelines for al-Qaeda/American peace. Some of the demands contained within the 24 minute message included withdrawal of US troops from Muslim lands and removal of US support for Israel. This video also includes clips of Matthew Hoh and several other U.S. military veteran antiwar activists.

On September 29, 2010, in another video, Gadahn urged Muslims in Pakistan to join Islamist militants fighting their nation's rulers, saying that Islamabad's "sluggish and halfhearted" response to the recent floods underscored the government's indifference towards its constituents. Gadahn's remarks in the video echoed those of al-Qaida's second-in-command, Ayman al-Zawahri, in a similar posting on militant websites earlier that month, suggesting the terror organization had decided on a single, simple message to promote, following the floods that affected as many as 20 million people in Pakistan.

On October 23, 2010, in a 48-minute video posted on militant Islamist websites, Adam Gadahn directed his appeal to Muslim immigrants in what he called the "miserable suburbs" of Paris, London and Detroit, as well as those traveling to the West to study or work.

On June 4, 2011, Gadahn called on American Muslims to buy weapons from gun shows and carry out random, lone-wolf attacks. The video, called 'Do Not Rely on Others, Take the Task Upon Yourself', was produced by al Qaeda's ''as Sahab'' media team and showed 32-year-old Gadahn speaking alongside old clips of Ayman al-Zawahiri and Osama Bin laden. In a calm voice, California-native Gadahn told Muslims it is easy to get weapons from gun shows and carry out random attacks. He said: 'America is absolutely awash with easily obtainable firearms. In one section of the video the logos of Exxon, Merrill Lynch and Bank of America are shown as possible targets.

On September 11, 2012, Gadahn appeared in a video marking the 11th anniversary of the 9/11 attacks.

On December 1, 2013, Gadahn denounced the capture of al-Qaeda operative Abu Anas al-Libi in an audio recording.

=== 2014 ===
On March 29, 2014, an unpublished video was leaked by the Islamic State of Iraq and the Levant that showed Gadahn condemning ISIL and calling them extremists.

== Pursuit and death ==
=== Reports of capture ===
On March 7, 2010, it was reported that Gadahn had been captured in Karachi, Pakistan in late February 2010, shortly after another video came out in which he called on Muslims serving in the U.S. armed forces to emulate the actions of Nidal Hasan. His arrest was not immediately confirmed by United States officials. Gadahn was said to have been arrested in Karachi by Pakistani intelligence officers during the course of a raid on a house located by the Super Highway. Pakistan's Dawn News reported on March 7 that this likely occurred in Sohrab Goth, a major Pashtun area in northern Karachi.

Senior American officials informed The New York Times that the individual arrested was not Gadahn. Subsequent reports indicated the individual arrested was Abu Yahya Mujahdeen Al-Adam, who was born in Pennsylvania and may have been confused with Gadahn. The confusion was apparently caused by an alias of Gadahn's that is similar to the name of the arrested individual. An unnamed Pakistani intelligence officer explained, "The resemblance of the name initially caused confusion but now they have concluded he is not Gadahn." Al-Adam, the arrested individual, was described by an American official as "fair-skinned" and able to speak both English and Pashto and is believed to be connected to the operations division of al-Qaeda. While a Pakistani security official said "he was apparently an American al Qaeda operative", it is unknown whether al-Adam is an American citizen. The Pakistani intelligence officer described the arrested individual as "proud to be a member of al-Qaida." The BBC reported an additional identification of the arrested as Egyptian-American Abu Yahya Azam.

=== Reports of death ===
In February 2008, Pakistani news sources reported rumors that Gadahn had been killed by a missile fired by a General Atomics MQ-1 Predator drone, in the strike that killed al-Qaeda leader Abu Laith al-Libi. On March 2, an al-Qaeda spokesperson claimed that Gadahn was alive, but the rumor of Gadahn's death was fueled by a considerable drop in the quality of recent al-Qaeda videos from As-Sahab.

Mansfield wrote: "Normally important messages from Zawahiri contain linguistic indications that they were translated by Adam Gadahn. Gadahn’s translation style is noticeably absent from this video, giving more credence to open source reports from Pakistan regarding the possible death of Gadahn in an American air strike. (Note: There are other plausible explanations for Gadahn's absence from the scene; it is noteworthy that in one of the videos in which Gadahn appeared he quipped that ripping up his passport would not hinder his ability to travel.")

On September 7, 2008, the Sunday Telegraph reported that Gadahn may have been killed by a Predator attack in January 2008 in Waziristan. This was reported by The Orange County Register and KABC-TV in Los Angeles.

On October 4, 2008, a video by Gadahn appeared on the website of the As-Sahab Foundation for Media Production.

=== Death ===
On April 23, 2015, White House Press Secretary Josh Earnest released a statement announcing that Gadahn had been killed in a CIA drone strike in Pakistan on January 19, 2015. In the same statement it was announced that, in a separate drone strike that killed Pakistani-American al-Qaeda leader Ahmed Farouq, aid workers Giovanni Lo Porto and Warren Weinstein, hostages held by al-Qaeda, were killed as collateral damage.

== Discography ==
=== Studio albums ===
Year	Title	Label	Note
1994	Delirium: 7 Hallucinatory Interludes, Op. 2	(not on label)	
1994	Nonrelativistic Quantum Mechanics/Larm	FDR Tapes	Split with EHI

=== Compilations ===
Year	Track title	Compilation	Label
1995	Regarding Various Insipid Debates On The Innate Logical Value Of Certain Religious Beliefs And Practices (Ver. 1)	Solitude Is The Future	FDR Tapes

== See also ==
- Americans in Pakistan
- D.C. Five – detention of five Americans in Pakistan (Dec. 2009)
- Michael Finton, American convert to Islam, attempted September 2009 bombing of U.S. target with FBI agent he thought was al-Qaeda member
- Sharif Mobley, American suspected al-Qaeda member, arrested in Yemen in 2010 and suspected of killing guard in escape attempt
- Aafia Siddiqui, alleged al-Qaeda member, former U.S. resident, convicted in 2010 of attempting to kill U.S. personnel
- Bryant Neal Vinas, American convert to Islam, convicted in 2009 of participating in/supporting al-Qaeda plots in Afghanistan and the U.S.
- Najibullah Zazi, al-Qaeda member, U.S. resident, pleaded guilty in 2010 of planning suicide bombings on New York City subway system
- Naser Jason Abdo, allegedly attempted to bomb a Fort Hood restaurant in 2011.
- Anwar al-Awlaki, American born Islamist cleric.
- Hasan K. Akbar, American Muslim convert convicted of the double-murder of two U.S. Army officers.
