= Aafia Siddiqui =

Pakistani-American neuroscientist convicted of attempted murder (born 1972)

- عافیہ صدیقی
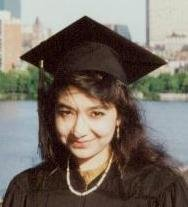
- Born: 2 March 1972 (age 54); Karachi, Sindh, Pakistan
- Other name: Afiya Siddiqui
- Education: Massachusetts Institute of Technology (BS); Brandeis University (PhD)
- Height: 5 ft 4 in (1.63 m)
- Board member of: Institute of Islamic Research and Teaching (President)
- Criminal charges: Attempted murder, assault with a deadly weapon
- Criminal penalty: Convicted; sentenced to 86 years in prison
- Criminal status: Held in the FMC Carswell, Fort Worth, Texas, United States.
- Spouses: Amjad Mohammed Khan (m. 1995; div. 2002) Ammar al-Baluchi (m. 2003; div. 2003)
- Children: 3, including Mohammad Ahmed

Aafia Siddiqui (Note: Also spelled Afiya; Urdu: عافیہ صدیقی) (born 2 March 1972) is a Pakistani neuroscientist and educator who gained international attention following her conviction in the United States and is currently serving an 86-year sentence for attempted murder and other felonies at the Federal Medical Center, Carswell, in Fort Worth, Texas.

Siddiqui was born in Pakistan to a Sunni Muslim family. For a period from 1990, she studied in the United States and obtained from the Massachusetts Institute of Technology a BS in biology in 1995, and a Ph.D. in neuroscience from Brandeis University in 2001. She returned to Pakistan for a time following the 9/11 attacks and again in 2003 during the war in Afghanistan. Khalid Sheikh Mohammad named her a courier and financier for al-Qaeda, and she was placed on the Federal Bureau of Investigations's Seeking Information – Terrorism list; she was the first woman to have been featured on the list. Around this time, she and her three children were allegedly kidnapped in Pakistan.

Five years later, she reappeared in Ghazni, Afghanistan, and was arrested by Afghan police and held for questioning by the FBI. While in custody, Siddiqui allegedly told the FBI she had gone into hiding but later disavowed her testimony and stated she had been abducted and imprisoned. Supporters believe she was held captive at Bagram Air Force Base as a ghost detainee, an allegation the US government denies. During her second day in custody, she shot at visiting U.S. FBI and Army personnel with an M4 carbine an interrogator had placed on the floor by his feet. She was shot in the torso when a warrant officer returned fire. She was hospitalized, treated and then extradited to the US, where in September 2008 she was indicted on charges of assault and attempted murder of a US soldier in the police station in Ghazni, charges she denies. She was convicted on 3 February 2010 and later sentenced to 86 years in prison.

In Pakistan, her arrest and conviction caused large protests throughout the country; while in the US, she was considered by some to be especially dangerous as "one of the few alleged al Qaeda associates with the ability to move about the United States undetected, and the scientific expertise to carry out a sophisticated attack". She has been termed "Lady al-Qaeda" by a number of media organizations due to her alleged affiliation with Islamists. The Islamic State have offered to trade her for prisoners on two occasions: once for James Foley and once for Kayla Mueller. Pakistani news media called the trial a "farce", while other Pakistanis labeled this reaction "knee-jerk Pakistani nationalism". Yusuf Raza Gilani, who was the Pakistani prime minister at that time, and opposition leader Nawaz Sharif promised to push for her release.

== Biography ==
=== Family and early life ===
Aafia Siddiqui was born in Karachi, Pakistan, to Muhammad Salay Siddiqui, a British-trained neurosurgeon, and Ismet (née Faroochi), an Islamic teacher, social worker and charity volunteer. She belongs to an Urdu-speaking Muhajir family, and was raised in an observant Muslim household. Her parents combined devotional Islam with their resolve to understand and use technological advances in science. Aafia attended school in Zambia until the age of eight and finished her primary and secondary schooling in Karachi.

Ismet Siddiqui was prominent in political and religious circles, teaching classes on Islam wherever she lived, founding a United Islamic Organization, and serving as a member of Pakistan's parliament. Her support for strict Islam in the face of feminist opposition to his Hudood Ordinances drew the attention of General Muhammad Zia-ul-Haq who appointed her to a Zakat Council. Siddiqui is the youngest of three siblings. Her brother, Muhammad, studied to become an architect in Houston, Texas, while her sister, Fowzia, is a Harvard-trained neurologist who worked at Sinai Hospital in Baltimore and taught at Johns Hopkins University before she returned to Pakistan.

=== Undergraduate education ===
Aafia Siddiqui moved to Houston, Texas, US on a student visa in 1990, joining her brother who was studying architecture. She attended the University of Houston where friends and family described her interests as limited to religion and schoolwork. She avoided movies, novels and television, except for the news. After three semesters, she transferred to the Massachusetts Institute of Technology.

In 1992, as a sophomore, Siddiqui won a $5,000 Carroll L. Wilson Award for her research proposal "Islamization in Pakistan and its Effects on Women". She returned to Pakistan to interview architects of the Islamization and the Hudood Laws, including Taqi Usmani, the spiritual adviser to her family. As a junior, she received a $1,200 City Days fellowship through MIT's program to help clean up Cambridge elementary school playgrounds. While she initially had a triple major in biology, anthropology, and archaeology at MIT, she graduated in 1995 with a BS in biology.

At MIT, Siddiqui lived in the all-female McCormick Hall. She remained active in charity work and proselytising. Her fellow MIT students described her as being religious, which was not unusual at the time, but not a fundamentalist, one of them saying that she was "just nice and soft-spoken". She joined the Muslim Students' Association, and a fellow Pakistani recalls her recruiting for association meetings and distributing pamphlets. Siddiqui began doing volunteer work for the Al Kifah Refugee Center after returning from Pakistan. Al Kifah included members who assassinated Jewish ultranationalist Meir Kahane and helped Ramzi Yousef with the 1993 World Trade Center bombing. She was known for her effectiveness in shaming audiences into contributing to jihad and the only woman known to have regularly raised money for Al-Kifah. Through the student association she met several committed Islamists, including Suheil Laher, its imam, who had publicly advocated Islamization and jihad before 9/11. Journalist Deborah Scroggins suggested that through the association's contacts Siddiqui may have been drawn into the world of terrorism:

At MIT, several of the MSA's most active members had fallen under the spell of Abdullah Azzam, a Muslim Brother who was Osama bin Laden's mentor .... [Azzam] had established the Al Kifah Refugee Center [Brooklyn, New York] to function as its worldwide recruiting post, propaganda office, and fund-raising center for the mujahideen fighting in Afghanistan ... It would become the nucleus of the al-Qaeda organization.

Aafia's commitment to al-Kifah showed no sign of dimming when the connection between its Jersey City branch and the World Trade Center bombing became apparent. When the Pakistani government helped the US arrest and extradite Ramzi Yousef for his role in the bombing (where Yousef hoped to kill 250,000 Americans by knocking one WTC tower over into the other) an outraged Siddiqui circulated the announcement with a scornful note deriding Pakistan for "officially" joining "the typical gang of our contemporary Muslim governments", closing her email with a quote from the Quran warning Muslims not to take Jews and Christians as friends. She wrote three guides for teaching Islam, expressing the hope in one: "that our humble effort continues ... and more and more people come to the [religion] of Allah until America becomes a Muslim land." She also took a 12-hour pistol training course at the Braintree Rifle and Pistol Club, mailed US military manuals to Pakistan and moved from her apartment after the FBI agents visited the university looking for her.

=== Marriage, graduate school, and work ===
In 1995, she agreed to a marriage arranged by her mother to Karachi-born anesthesiologist Amjad Mohammed Khan just out of medical school and whom she had never seen. The marriage ceremony was conducted over the telephone. Khan then came to the US, and the couple lived first in Lexington, Massachusetts, and then in the Mission Hill neighbourhood of Roxbury, Boston, where he worked as an anesthesiologist at Brigham and Women's Hospital. She gave birth to a son, Muhammad Ahmed, in 1996, and to a daughter, Mariam Bint-e Muhammad, in 1998.

Siddiqui studied cognitive neuroscience at Brandeis University. In early 1999, while she was a graduate student, she taught the General Biology Laboratory course. She received her PhD in 2001 after completing her dissertation on learning through imitation titled Separating the Components of Imitation. She co-authored a journal article on selective learning that was published in 2003. One incident that caused controversy was her presentation of a paper on fetal alcohol syndrome where she concluded that science showed why God had forbidden alcohol in the Quran. When told by some teachers this was inappropriate, she complained bitterly of discrimination to the associate dean of graduate studies, threatening to "open a can of worms".

After receiving her PhD, she told one of her advisers she planned to devote herself to her family over her career. She began translating biographies of Arab Afghan shahid (jihad fighters who had been killed) written by Abdullah Yusuf Azzam ("the Godfather of Afghan Jihad"). and became more strict in her religion, wearing a niqāb—a black veil that covered everything but her eyes—and avoiding any music—even background music at science exhibits.

In 1999, while living in Boston, Siddiqui founded the Institute of Islamic Research and Teaching as a nonprofit organization. She was the organization's president, her husband treasurer, and her sister resident agent. (Note: On 3 October 2005, the Internal Revenue Service revoked the organization's charitable status (see Foundations Status of Certain Organizations Archived 8 May 2017 at the Wayback Machine, Internal Revenue Bulletin 2005–40, Announcement 25–67, 3 October 2005)) She attended a mosque outside the city where she stored copies of the Quran and other Islamic literature for distribution. She also co-founded the Dawa Resource Center, which offered faith-based services to prison inmates.

=== Divorce, al-Qaeda allegations, and remarriage ===
Tensions began to arise in her marriage, which, according to Siddiqui's then-husband Khan, was caused by her overwhelming devotion to activism and jihad. Siddiqui temporarily moved away from her husband after he threw a baby bottle at her that required a visit to the emergency room to stitch up her lip. In the summer of 2001, the couple moved to Malden, Massachusetts.

According to Khan, after the 9/11 attacks, Siddiqui was adamant that the family leave the United States, saying that their lives were in danger if they remained. Once back in Pakistan, Siddiqui demanded that the family move to the border with Afghanistan and Khan work as a medic to help the Taliban mujahideen in their fight against the United States. Khan was reluctant to disobey his parents, who opposed this move, and uncertain if he had reached the stature traditionally thought necessary to wage jihad. Siddiqui agreed to return to him in the United States in January 2002 after he agreed to her conditions including that he join her in Islamic activities. She began home schooling her children.

By this point, the FBI was questioning Siddiqui's former professors and other associates. In May 2002, the FBI began questioning Siddiqui and her husband regarding their purchase over the internet of $10,000 worth of night vision equipment, body armour, and military manuals including The Anarchist's Arsenal, Fugitive, Advanced Fugitive, and How to Make C-4. Khan claimed that these were for hunting and camping expeditions. He later told authorities he purchased them to please Siddiqui. The couple made an appointment to talk to the FBI again in a few weeks, but, according to Khan, Siddiqui insisted the family leave for Pakistan, and on 26 June 2002, the couple and their children returned to Karachi.

In August 2002, Khan alleged that Siddiqui was abusive and manipulative throughout their seven years of marriage; he suspected she was involved in extremist activities. Khan went to Siddiqui's parents' home, announced his intention to divorce her, and argued with her father. Shortly after, Siddiqui's father died of a heart attack, an event blamed on Khan and the marriage difficulties he and Siddiqui were having. This further poisoned his relationship with Siddiqui's family.

In September 2002, Siddiqui gave birth to Suleman, the last of their three children. Following an attempted and failed reconciliation and the signing of a divorce document shortly after, the couple never saw each other again. The couple's divorce was finalised on 21 October 2002. According to her statements to the FBI, it was at this point that her connections with Al-Qaeda began in earnest.

In February 2003, Siddiqui married Ammar al-Baluchi, an accused al-Qaeda member and a nephew of al-Qaeda leader Khalid Sheikh Mohammed (KSM), in Karachi. While her family denies she married al-Baluchi, Pakistani and US intelligence sources, a psychologist for the defense during her 2009 trial, and Khalid Sheikh Mohammed's family all confirm that the marriage took place. The marriage lasted only a couple of months. According to one of KSM's uncles, Mohammed Hussein, al-Baluchi became alienated with Siddiqui's "liberal way of life." Siddiqui told the FBI that al-Baluchi divorced her after he was arrested.

==== Alleged conspiring with KSM ====
Siddiqui left for the US on 25 December 2002, informing her ex-husband Amjad Mohammed Khan that she was looking for a job; she returned on 2 January 2003. He later stated he was suspicious of her explanation as universities were on winter break. The purpose of the trip was to assist Majid Khan in opening a post office box so that it could appear he was living in the US when he mailed his application for an INS travel document. Majid Khan was listed as a co-owner of the box. The FBI alleged that Majid Khan was an al-Qaeda operative. Siddiqui told the FBI that she agreed to open the post box and mail the application because he was a family friend. The P.O. box key was later found in the possession of Uzair Paracha, who was convicted of providing material support to al-Qaeda.

According to the US government, Majid Khan was an operative for an Al-Qaeda cell led by Khalid Sheikh Mohammad which planned to attack targets in the US, in the UK (at Heathrow Airport), and inside Pakistan. In the US, C-4 plastic explosives and other chemicals would be smuggled in under the cover of textile exports – 20 and 40 ft foot containers filled with women's and children's clothes. The explosives would be used to bomb petrol stations, underground fuel storage tanks in Baltimore and chemicals to poison or destroy pumps to water treatment facilities. A dummy import-export business run by Saifullah Paracha (who was subsequently interned at Guantánamo Bay for 18 years before his transfer back to Pakistan in 2021), would import the explosives.

According to the US government, Siddiqui's role was to "rent houses and provide administrative support for the operation". When she returned from Pakistan to the US in January 2003, it was, according to the charge, to help renew the American travel papers of Majid Khan, who would execute the bombing. In his testimony, Majid Khan stated that he provided Siddiqui with money, photos, and a completed application for an "asylum travel form" that "looked and functioned like a passport". He also testified that back in the US Siddiqui "opened a post office box in detainee's name, using her driver's licence information".

The plot unraveled after Majid Khan was arrested in Pakistan on 1 March 2003 and sent to Guantánamo. In America, another operative, Uzair Paracha, was arrested in possession of the post box key. Defense attorneys note that testimony gathered by investigators was "likely to have been extracted under conditions of torture". Her lawyer suggested she had been the victim of identity theft while her sister Fowzia has maintained the post office box was intended for use in applying for jobs at American universities. In Siddiqui's trial, charges were not brought against her for opening of the post box or mailing the application.

Amjad Mohammed Khan (her ex-husband) was questioned by the FBI and released.

==== Blood diamond allegations ruled out ====
According to a dossier prepared by UN investigators for the 9/11 Commission in 2004, Siddiqui, using the alias Fahrem or Feriel Shahin, was one of six alleged al-Qaeda members who bought $19 million worth of blood diamonds in Monrovia, Liberia, immediately prior to the 11 September 2001 attacks. The diamonds were purchased because they were untraceable assets to be used for funding al-Qaeda operations. The identification of Siddiqui was made three years after the incident by one of the go-betweens in the Liberian deal. Alan White, former chief investigator of the UN-backed war crimes tribunal in Liberia, said she was the woman. Siddiqui's lawyer maintained credit card receipts and other records showed that she was in Boston at the time.

In early 2003, while Siddiqui was working at Aga Khan University in Karachi, she emailed a former professor at Brandeis and expressed interest in working in the US, citing lack of options in Karachi for women of her academic background.

According to "a combination of US intelligence analysis and direct testimony by at least three senior al-Qaida figures", known as Guantánamo files, Siddiqui was an al-Qaeda operative. The file included evidence from Khalid Sheikh Muhammad (KSM), the al-Qaeda chief planner of the 11 September 2001 attacks, who was interrogated and tortured (waterboarded 183 times) after his arrest on 1 March 2003. His "confessions" – obtained while being tortured – triggered a series of related arrests shortly thereafter and included naming Siddiqui. On 25 March 2003, the FBI issued a global "wanted for questioning" alert for Siddiqui and her ex-husband, Khan. Siddiqui was accused of being a "courier of blood diamonds and a financial fixer for al-Qaida". FBI agent Dennis Lormel, who investigated terrorism financing, said the agency ruled out a specific claim that she had evaluated diamond operations in Liberia though she remained suspected of money laundering.

=== Disappearance ===
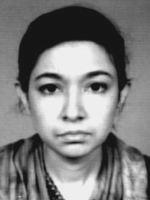
FBI composite image of Siddiqui for the FBI wanted poster

Aware that the FBI wanted her for questioning, she left her parents' house 30 March 2003 with her three children. According to her parents, she was going to go to Islamabad to visit her uncle but never arrived. Around 25 March, the FBI put out a "worldwide alert" for Aafia and her ex-husband.

Siddiqui's and her children's whereabouts and activities from March 2003 to July 2008 are a matter of dispute. Her supporters and the Pakistani government claim she was held as a prisoner by the US; the US government and others (including Siddiqui in her statements to the FBI immediately after her arrest) suggest she went into hiding with KSM's al-Baluchi family.

Starting 29 March, a "confusing series" of reports and denials of her arrest and detention appeared in Pakistan and the US. On 1 April 2003, local newspapers reported and Pakistan interior ministry confirmed that a woman had been taken into custody on terrorism charges. The Boston Globe described "sketchy" Pakistani news reports saying she had been detained for questioning by Pakistani authorities and the FBI. However, a couple of days later, both the Pakistan government and the FBI publicly stated they were uninvolved in her disappearance. Her sister Fowzia (Note: Though "Fowzia" is predominantly used by sources as the spelling for Aafia's sister's name in the Latin alphabet, a few use "Fauzia". As the (now defunct) official justiceforaafia.org website, linked in this article, as well as Scroggins, Wanted Women, 2012 both use "Fowzia" (except when printing a direct quote, with two such instances in Scroggins's book), "Fowzia" is used throughout the text of this en.wiki article.) claimed Interior Minister Faisal Saleh Hayat said that her sister had been released and would be returning home "shortly".

In 2003–04, the FBI and the Pakistani government said Siddiqui was still at large. On 26 May 2004, US Attorney General John Ashcroft held a press conference described her as among the seven "most wanted" al-Qaeda fugitives and a "clear and present danger to the US". Newsweek reported that she might be "the most immediately threatening suspect in the group".

One day before the announcement, however, The New York Times cited the US Department of Homeland Security saying there were no current risks; American Democrats accused the Bush administration of attempting to divert attention from plummeting poll numbers and to push the failings of the Invasion of Iraq off the front pages.

After her 2008 reappearance and arrest, Siddiqui told the FBI that she had at first gone into hiding with KSM's al-Baluchi clan (her lawyer later repudiated that statement) and worked at the Karachi Institute of Technology in 2005, was in Afghanistan in 2007, and also spent time in Quetta, Pakistan, sheltered by various people. She told the FBI she met with Mufti Abu Lubaba Shah Mansoor, and according to the FBI, had begun collecting materials on viruses for biological warfare. According to an intelligence official in the Afghan Ministry of the Interior, her son, Ahmed, who was with her when she was arrested, said he and Siddiqui had worked in an office in Pakistan collecting money for poor people. He told Afghan investigators that on 14 August 2008 they had traveled by road from Quetta to Afghanistan. An Afghan intelligence official said he believes that Siddiqui was working with Jaish-e-Mohammed (the "Army of Muhammad"), a Pakistani Islamic mujahideen military group that fights in Kashmir and Afghanistan.

According to her ex-husband Khan, after the global alert for her was issued, Siddiqui went into hiding and worked for al-Qaeda. During her disappearance, Khan said he saw her at Islamabad airport in April 2003 as she disembarked from a flight with their son; he said he helped Inter-Services Intelligence identify her. He said he again saw her two years later, in a Karachi traffic jam. Khan unsuccessfully sought custody of his son Ahmed and said most of the claims of Siddiqui's family in the Pakistani media relating to her and their children were one-sided and largely false.

In a signed affidavit, Siddiqui's maternal uncle, Shams ul-Hassan Faruqi, stated that on 22 January 2008 she visited him in Islamabad and told him she had been held by Pakistani agencies. Knowing he had worked in Afghanistan and made contact with the Taliban in 1999, she asked for his help to cross into Taliban-controlled Afghanistan where she thought she would be safe. He told her he was no longer in touch with them. He notified his sister, Siddiqui's mother, who came the next day to see her daughter. He said that Siddiqui stayed with them for two days. Investigating the disappearance, US journalist Deborah Scroggins reported that Geo TV presenter Hamid Mir informed her that friends of Siddiqui believed she had gone underground avoiding the FBI. Scroggins was also warned by Pakistanis with jihadist connections, including Khalid Khawaja, that she might end up like Daniel Pearl (who was beheaded) if she attempted to find Siddiqui.

Ahmed and Siddiqui reappeared in 2008. Afghan authorities handed the boy over to his aunt in Pakistan in September 2008, who has prohibited the press from talking to him. In April 2010, DNA identified a girl as Siddiqui's daughter, Mariyam.

==== Alleged kidnapping ====
When Siddiqui's ex-mother-in-law and ex-father-in-law filed a custody suit against the Siddiqui family in an attempt to see their grandchildren (the Siddiqui family refused to talk to them), Siddiqui's mother claimed under oath the FBI and US Justice Department officials had informed her that "the minors are with the mother and are in safe condition", the opposite of what such officials had told her American lawyer in May of that year. Siddiqui's sister and mother denied that she had any connections to al-Qaeda and claimed that the US held her secretly in Afghanistan. They pointed to comments by former Bagram Air Base, Afghanistan, detainees who say Siddiqui had been at the prison while they were there. Her sister said that Siddiqui had been raped, and tortured for five years.

According to journalist, Muslim convert, and former Taliban captive Yvonne Ridley, Siddiqui spent those years in solitary confinement at Bagram as "Prisoner 650". Six human rights groups, including Amnesty International, listed her as a possible ghost prisoner held by the US. In early 2007, the Pakistan government started releasing more than a hundred people who had been listed as "missing". At the time, the CIA reportedly detained up to 100 people at secret facilities. S.H. Faruqi, Siddiqui's uncle, reported that Siddiqui visited him in January 2008, telling him she had been imprisoned and tortured at Bagram Airfield for several years and released to serve as a double agent infiltrating extremist groups. Siddiqui herself later claimed that she had been kidnapped by US intelligence and Pakistani intelligence. According to one Pakistani report, her mother claimed to have been warned by an unidentified man "not to make a fuss about her daughter's disappearance, if she wants safe recovery of her daughter", suggesting that either government intelligence services or the "nexus of Pakistani and Arab jihadis" had hidden Siddiqui.

Siddiqui has not explained clearly what happened to her other two children. According to a psychiatric exam given while she was in custody, her story has alternated between claiming that the two youngest children were dead and that they were with her sister Fowzia. She told one FBI agent that pursuing the cause of jihad had to take priority. Khan said he believed that the missing children were in Karachi, either with or in contact with Siddiqui's family, and not in US detention. He said that they had been seen in her sister's house in Karachi and in Islamabad since 2003.

In 2010, Aafia's daughter, Mariam, was found outside her aunt's home in Pakistan.

The US government said it had not held Siddiqui during that time frame and was unaware of her location from March 2003 until July 2008. The mass of secret U.S. cables released in 2010 by Wikileaks included memos by the US Embassy in Islamabad Pakistan asking other United States government departments whether Aafia had been in secret custody. One stated: "Bagram officials have assured us that they have not been holding Siddiqui for the last four years, as has been alleged."

The US ambassador to Pakistan, Anne W. Patterson, stated that Siddiqui had not been in US custody "at any time" prior to July 2008. The US Justice Department and the CIA denied the allegations, and Gregory Sullivan, a State Department spokesman, said: "For several years, we have had no information regarding her whereabouts whatsoever. It is our belief that she ... has all this time been concealed from the public view by her own choosing." Assistant US Attorney David Raskin said in 2008 that United States agencies found "zero evidence" that she was abducted, kidnapped, or tortured in 2003. He added: "A more plausible inference is that she went into hiding because people around her started to get arrested, and at least two of those people ended up at Guantanamo Bay." According to some U.S. officials, she went underground after the FBI alert for her was issued and was at large working on behalf of al-Qaeda. The Guardian cited an anonymous senior Pakistani official suggesting Siddiqui may have abandoned the militant cause.

Another theory was that the CIA and FBI did not have the ability to capture suspects in Pakistan, where many people were anti-American, and only the ISI had the ability to capture Siddiqui. While the ISI may have known how to get her or even have her in custody, they were not "ready to hand her over", whatever reward the Americans offered.

=== Alleged danger ===
Siddiqui was on the CIA's list of suspected al-Qaeda terrorists it was authorized to "kill or capture". According to Rolf Mowatt-Larssen of the Counterterrorism Center at the CIA, what set Siddiqui apart from other terrorism suspects was "her combination of high intelligence (including general scientific know-how), religious zeal, and years of experience in the United States ... So far they have had very few people who have been able to come to the U.S. and thrive. Aafia is different. She knows about U.S. immigration procedures and visas. She knows how to enroll in American educational institutions. She can open bank accounts and transfer money. She knows how things work here. She could have been very useful to them simply for her understanding of the U.S."

While the CIA's sources of information could not determine her exact role in al-Qaeda, "[s]he was always in the picture. Connections between her and other people in FBI was looking at surfaced in just about every al-Qaeda investigation with a U.S. angle. She was always on our radar."

According to the FBI, in her testimony to them she had collected materials on viruses for biological warfare and one of her projects was finding a way to infect America's poultry supplies with an antibody that would allow chickens to pass salmonella on to humans more easily. She later destroyed her work after suspecting Abu Lubab was hoping to double cross her and turn her into the United States authorities.

=== Arrest in Afghanistan ===
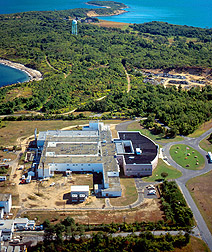
The Plum Island Animal Disease Center, one of the locations listed in Siddiqui's notes with regard to a "mass casualty" attack

On the evening of 17 July 2008, a woman was approached by Ghazni Province police officers in the city of Ghazni outside the Ghazni governor's compound. She was holding two small bags at her side while crouching on the ground. This aroused the officer's suspicion, raising concerns that she might be concealing a bomb under her burqa. Previously, a shopkeeper had noticed a woman in a burqa drawing a map, which is suspicious in Afghanistan where women are generally illiterate. There had also been a report that a Pakistani woman in a burqa with a boy were traveling in Afghanistan urging women to volunteer for suicide bombing. She was accompanied by a young boy that she said was her adopted son. She said her name was Saliha, that she was from Multan in Pakistan, and that the boy's name was Ali Hassan. Discovering that she did not speak either of Afghanistan's main languages, Pashto or Dari, the officers regarded her as suspicious. She told the police she was looking for her husband, needed no help, and started to walk away. She was arrested and taken to the police station for questioning. She initially claimed the boy was her stepson, Ali Hassan. The woman was not identified as Siddiqui until after she was fingerprinted. She subsequently admitted he was her biological son when DNA testing proved the boy to be Ahmed.

In a bag she was carrying, the police found a number of documents in English and Urdu describing how to make explosives, chemical weapons, Ebola, dirty bombs, and radiological agents, as well as the mortality rates of certain weapons and handwritten notes referring to a "mass casualty attack" that listed various US locations and landmarks (including the Plum Island Animal Disease Center, the Empire State Building, the Statue of Liberty, Wall Street, the Brooklyn Bridge, and the New York City subway system), according to her indictment. The Boston Globe also mentioned one document about a "theoretical" biological weapon that did not harm children. She also reportedly had documents about American military bases, excerpts from a bombmaking manual, a one-gigabyte digital media storage device that contained over 500 electronic documents (including correspondence referring to attacks by "cells", describing the US as an enemy, and discussing recruitment of jihadists and training), maps of Ghazni and the provincial governor's compounds and nearby mosques, and photos of members of the Pakistani military. Other notes described various ways to attack enemies, including by destroying reconnaissance drones, using underwater bombs, and using gliders.

She also had "numerous chemical substances in gel and liquid form that were sealed in bottles and glass jars", according to the later complaint against her, and about two pounds of sodium cyanide, a highly toxic poison. US prosecutors later said that sodium cyanide is lethal even when ingested in small doses, and various of the other chemicals she had could be used in explosives. Abdul Ghani, Ghazni's deputy police chief, said she later confessed she had planned a suicide attack against the governor of Ghazni Province.

==== Explanation ====
Attempting to explain the timing of her January 2008 visit to her uncle and asking for help in contacting the Taliban in Afghanistan, and her reappearance in Ghazni in July later that year, journalist Deborah Scroggins noted that a breakdown in the "long-standing alliance between the Deobandi jihadis and the military" occurred in preceding months, which—if Siddiqui was in hiding rather than imprisoned—could have led to Siddiqui's "falling out with her secret government protectors". In 2007, a roving "burka brigade" of women based at Lal Mosque attempted to enforce sharia law in Islamabad. Attempts to stop them climaxed in July when at least 100 militants were killed by the military in the storming of the Lal Mosque. In the next five months, dozens of suicide attacks killing almost 2,000 people (including many soldiers) were executed in retaliation. Scroggins believed this bloodshed may have alienated any military protection Siddiqui had, and the role played by women of the "burka brigade" could have been seen by conservative Islamists as evidence of women causing fitna (strife).

On the other hand, supporters noted that Siddiqui's reappearance "loitering in Ghazni ... less than two weeks" after a press conference by Yvonne Ridley where Ridley alleged Siddiqui had been "held in isolation by the Americans for more than four years", and which "attracted enormous coverage" especially in the Muslim world, seemed highly suspicious.

=== Shooting(s) in Ghazni ===
There are conflicting accounts of the events following her arrest in Ghazni. American authorities said that two FBI agents, a US Army warrant officer, a US Army captain, and their US military interpreters arrived in Ghazni the following day on 18 July to interview Siddiqui at the Afghan National Police facility where she was being held. They reported they congregated in a meeting room that was partitioned by a curtain, but did not realise that Siddiqui was standing unsecured behind the curtain. The warrant officer sat down and put his loaded M4 carbine on the floor by his feet near the curtain. Siddiqui drew back the curtain, picked up the rifle, and pointed it at the captain. "I could see the barrel of the rifle, the inner portion of the barrel of the weapon; that indicated to me that it was pointed straight at my head," he said. Then, she was said to have threatened them loudly in English, and yelled "Get the fuck out of here" and "May the blood of [unintelligible] be on your [head or hands]". The captain dove for cover to his left as she yelled "Allah Akbar" and fired at least two shots at them, missing them. An Afghan interpreter who was seated closest to her tried to disarm her. At that point, the warrant officer returned fire with a 9-millimeter pistol, hitting her in the torso, and one of the interpreters disarmed her. A Justice Department statement said that Siddiqui struck and kicked the officers during the ensuing struggle; "she shout[ed] in English that she wanted to kill Americans" and then lost consciousness.

Siddiqui related a different version of events, according to Pakistani senators who later visited her in jail. She denied touching a gun, shouting, or threatening anyone. She said she stood up to see who was on the other side of the curtain, and that after one of the startled soldiers shouted "she is loose", she was shot. On regaining consciousness, she said someone said "We could lose our jobs."

Some of the Afghan police offered a third version of the events, telling Reuters that US troops had demanded that she be handed over, disarmed the Afghans when they refused, and then shot Siddiqui mistakenly thinking she was a suicide bomber.

=== Hospital treatment and evaluation ===
Siddiqui was taken to U.S. military base Bagram Airfield in Afghanistan by helicopter in critical condition. When she arrived at the hospital, she was rated at 3 on the Glasgow Coma Scale, but she underwent surgery without complication. She was hospitalised at the Craig Theater Joint Hospital, and recovered over the next two weeks. According to FBI reports prepared after the operation, Siddiqui repeatedly denied shooting anyone. FBI reports maintained that Siddiqui told a US special agent at the Craig Hospital on or about 1 August that "spewing bullets at soldiers is bad", and expressed surprise that she was being treated well.

While at the hospital, she was interrogated by an FBI agent every day for ten days for an "average of eight hours" a day. Her testimony was at odds with what Siddiqui later told lawyers and the court about what happened during her disappearance. Supporters complained that she was not Mirandized, nor did she have access to a Pakistani consular official, and that she was in a "narcotic state" at the time. She later told visiting Pakistani her statements might not look good to the Pakistani public but she had made them because her children had been threatened.

== Criminal complaint and trial ==
In pretrial activity, defense attorney Elaine Sharp said that the documents and item found on Siddiqui were planted. A government terrorism expert disagreed, stating there were "hundred of pages in her own handwriting". In Pakistan, Siddiqui's sister Fowzia accused the US of raping and torturing her sister and denying her medical treatment. The Pakistan National Assembly passed a unanimous resolution calling for Siddiqui's repatriation.

Prior to her trial, Siddiqui said she was innocent of all charges. She maintained she could prove she was innocent but refused to do so in court. On 11 January 2010, Siddiqui told the judge that she would not co-operate with her attorneys and wanted to fire them. She said she did not trust the judge and added, "I'm boycotting the trial, just to let all of you know. There's too many injustices." She then put her head down on the defence table as the prosecution proceeded.

=== Charges ===
On 31 July 2008, while Siddiqui was still being treated in Afghanistan, she was charged in a sealed criminal complaint in the United States District Court for the Southern District of New York with assault with a deadly weapon and with attempting to kill a United States Army Captain "while engaged in ... official duties". In total, she was charged on two counts of attempted murder of US nationals, officers, and employees, assault with a deadly weapon, carrying and using a firearm, and three counts of assault on US officers and employees.

Explaining why the US may have chosen to charge her as they did rather than for her alleged terrorism, Bruce Hoffman, professor of security studies at Georgetown University, said: "There's no intelligence data that needs to be introduced, no sources and methods that need to be risked. It's a good old-fashioned crime; it's the equivalent of a 1920s gangster with a tommy gun."

Defense lawyer Sharp expressed skepticism regarding both the terrorism and assault charges: "I think it's interesting that they make all these allegations about the dirty bombs and other items she supposedly had, but they haven't charged her with anything relating to terrorism ... I would urge people to consider her as innocent unless the government proves otherwise."

=== Extradition and arraignment ===
On 4 August 2008, Siddiqui was placed on an FBI jet and flown to New York City after the Afghan government granted extradition to the United States for trial. She refused to appear for her arraignment or attend a hearing in September or meet with visitors. Siddiqui made her first appearance before a judge in a Manhattan courtroom on 6 August 2008 following which she was remanded into custody.

Clive Stafford Smith alleged that Pakistan’s military under Pervez Musharraf transferred Siddiqui to US custody in a bounty-based deal involving "corrupt elements" and has since avoided pursuing her return to prevent exposing the alleged misconduct.

=== Medical treatment and psychological assessments ===
On 11 August, after her counsel maintained that Siddiqui had not seen a doctor since arriving in the US the previous week, US Magistrate Judge Henry B. Pitman ordered that she be examined by a medical doctor within 24 hours. Prosecutors maintained that Siddiqui had received adequate medical care for her gunshot wound but could not confirm whether she had been seen by a doctor or paramedic. The judge postponed her bail hearing until 3 September. An examination by a doctor the following day found no visible signs of infection; she also received a CAT scan.

Siddiqui was provided care for her wound while incarcerated in the United States. In September 2008, a prosecutor reported to the court that Siddiqui had refused to be examined by a female doctor, despite the doctor's extensive efforts. On 9 September 2008, she underwent a forced medical exam. In November 2008, forensic psychologist Leslie Powers reported that Siddiqui had been "reluctant to allow medical staff to treat her". Her last medical exam had indicated her external wounds no longer required medical dressing and were healing well. A psychiatrist employed by the prosecutor to examine Siddiqui's competence to stand trial, Gregory B. Saathoff, observed in a March 2009 report that Siddiqui frequently verbally and physically refused to allow the medical staff to check her vital signs and weight, attempted to refuse medical care once it was apparent that her wound had largely healed, and refused to take antibiotics. At the same time, Siddiqui claimed to her brother that when she needed medical treatment she did not get it, which Saathoff said he found no support for in his review of documents and interviews with medical and security personnel, nor in his interviews with Siddiqui.

Siddiqui's trial was subject to delays, the longest being six months to perform psychiatric evaluations. She had been given routine mental health check-ups ten times in August and six times in September. She underwent three sets of psychological assessments before trial. Her first psychiatric evaluation diagnosed her with depressive psychosis, and her second evaluation, ordered by the court, revealed chronic depression. Leslie Powers initially determined Siddiqui mentally unfit to stand trial. After reviewing portions of FBI reports, however, she told the pre-trial judge she believed Siddiqui was faking mental illness.

In a third set of psychological assessments, more detailed than the previous two, three of four psychiatrists concluded that she was "malingering" (faking her symptoms of mental illness) and that she behaved normally when she thought the assessors were not looking. One suggested that this was to prevent criminal prosecution and to improve her chances of being returned to Pakistan. In April 2009, Manhattan federal judge Richard Berman held that she "may have some mental health issues" but was competent to stand trial.

While Khalid Sheikh Mohammad and other ghost prisoners had given the Red Cross "elaborate descriptions of waterboardings and other tortures" they had suffered, government psychiatrist Sally Johnson testified in a pre-trial hearing that Siddiqui had never given anyone, whether her brother, her lawyers, Pakistani senators or embassy personnel, other visitors, prison staff or psychiatrists, "a clear account of any torture or imprisonment".

=== Antisemitism ===
A three-person defence team was hired by the Pakistani embassy to supplement her two existing public defenders, but Siddiqui refused to co-operate with them. She tried to dismiss her lawyers on the grounds that they were Jewish. She said the case against her was a Jewish conspiracy, demanded that no Jews be allowed on the jury, and that all prospective jurors be DNA-tested and excluded from the jury at her trial "if they have a Zionist or Israeli background". She stated: "they are all mad at me ... I have a feeling everyone here is them—subject to genetic testing. They should be excluded, if you want to be fair." In regard to her comments, Siddiqui's legal team stated that her incarceration had damaged her mind. While at Federal Medical Center, Carswell, she wrote a letter to the warden to give to President Obama, asserting, "Study the history of the Jews. They have always back-stabbed everyone who has taken pity on them and made the 'fatal' error of giving them shelter .... and it is this cruel, ungrateful back-stabbing of the Jews that has caused them to be mercilessly expelled from wherever they gain strength. This why 'holocausts' keep happening to them repeatedly! If they would only learn to be grateful and change their behavior!! ..." She later claimed she was not against all "Israeli Americans".

=== Trial proceedings ===
After 18 months of detention, Siddiqui's trial began in New York City on 19 January 2010. Prior to the jury entering the courtroom, Siddiqui told onlookers that she would not work with her lawyers because the trial was a sham. She also said: "I have information about attacks, more than 9/11! ... I want to help the President to end this group, to finish them ... They are a domestic, U.S. group; they are not Muslim."

Nine government witnesses were called by the prosecution. Army Captain Robert Snyder, John Threadcraft, a former army officer, and FBI agent John Jefferson testified first. As Snyder testified that Siddiqui had been arrested with a handwritten note outlining plans to attack various US sites, she interjected: "Since I'll never get a chance to speak ... If you were in a secret prison ... or your children were tortured ... Give me a little credit, this is not a list of targets against New York. I was never planning to bomb it. You're lying." The court also heard from FBI agent John Jefferson and Ahmed Gul, an army interpreter, who recounted their struggle with her. The judge disallowed as evidence her possession of chemicals and terror manuals and her alleged ties to al-Qaeda because they could have created an inappropriate bias.

Her defence argued that there was no forensic evidence that the rifle was fired in the interrogation room. They noted the nine government witnesses offered conflicting accounts of how many people were in the room, where they were positioned and how many shots were fired. It said that her handbag contents were not credible as evidence because they were sloppily handled. The prosecution argued that it was not unusual to fail to get fingerprints off a gun. "This is a crime that was committed in a war zone, a chaotic and uncontrolled environment 6,000 miles away from here." Gul's testimony appeared, according to the defence, to differ from that given by Snyder with regard to whether Siddiqui was standing or on her knees as she fired the rifle. When Siddiqui testified, she admitted trying to escape, but said she had not taken the rifle or fired any shots. She said she had been "tortured in secret prisons" before her arrest by a "group of people pretending to be Americans, doing bad things in America's name".

Siddiqui insisted on testifying at the trial against the advice of her lawyers. According to at least one source (Deborah Scroggins), Siddiqui "avoided the question of where she had been for the last five years" and her replies under cross examination may have damaged her credibility in jurists' eyes. In answer to prosecutor's questions, she stated that the documents in her bag on terror plans and weapons had been given to her, and that she did not know that the boy who was with her in Ghazni was her son. When it was pointed out that the documents in her bag were in her own handwriting, she stated "in a vague and halting manner" that she had been forced to copy them out of a magazine so that her children would not be tortured. When questioned about taking a firearms course, she stated that "everyone used to take it". The pistol safety instructor then testified that he remembered teaching her how to fire "hundreds of rounds". In his closing arguments, the prosecutor told the jury that Siddiqui had "raised her right hand" and "lied to your face".

During the trial, Siddiqui was removed from the court several times for repeatedly interrupting the proceedings with shouting; on being ejected, she was told by the judge that she could watch the proceedings on closed-circuit television in an adjacent holding cell. A request by the defence lawyers to declare a mistrial was turned down by the judge. Amnesty International monitored the trial for fairness.

=== Conviction ===
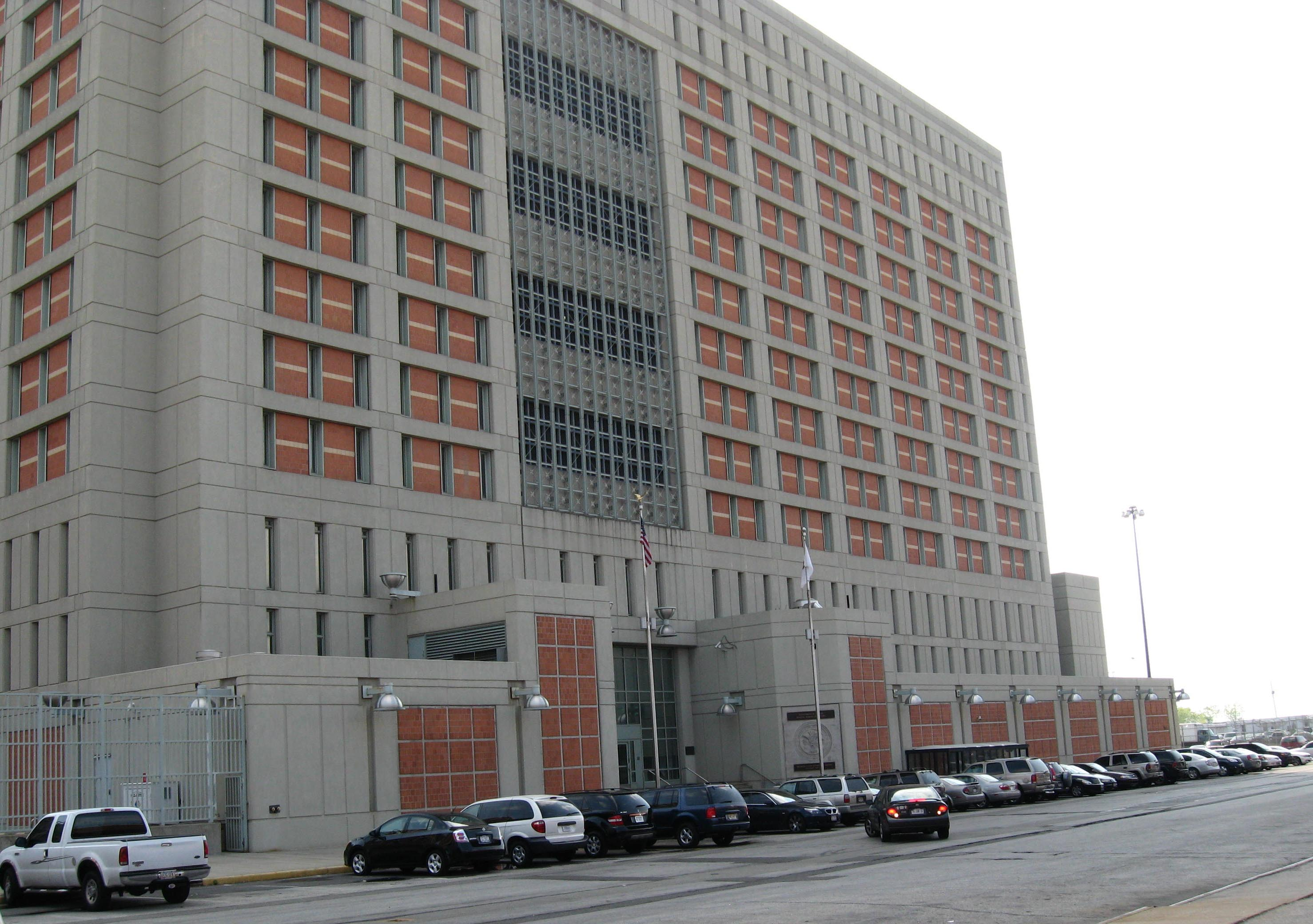
Metropolitan Detention Center, Brooklyn, where Siddiqui was formerly imprisoned before transferring in 2010

The trial lasted 14 days with the jury deliberating for three days before reaching a verdict. On 3 February 2010, Siddiqui was found guilty of two counts of attempted murder, armed assault, using and carrying a firearm, and three counts of assault on U.S. officers and employees. After jurors found Siddiqui guilty, she exclaimed: "This is a verdict coming from Israel, not America. That's where the anger belongs."

She faced a minimum sentence of 30 years and a maximum of life in prison on the firearm charge, and could also have received a sentence of up to 20 years for each attempted murder and armed assault charge, and up to 8 years on each of the remaining assault counts. Her lawyers requested a 12-year sentence, instead of the life sentence recommended by the probation office. They argued that mental illness drove her actions when she attempted to escape from the Afghan National Police station "by any means available ... what she viewed as a horrific fate". Her lawyers also claimed her mental illness was on display during her trial outbursts and boycotts, and that she was "first and foremost" the victim of her own irrational behaviour. The sentencing hearing set to take place on 6 May 2010 was rescheduled for mid-August 2010 and then September 2010.

=== Sentencing ===
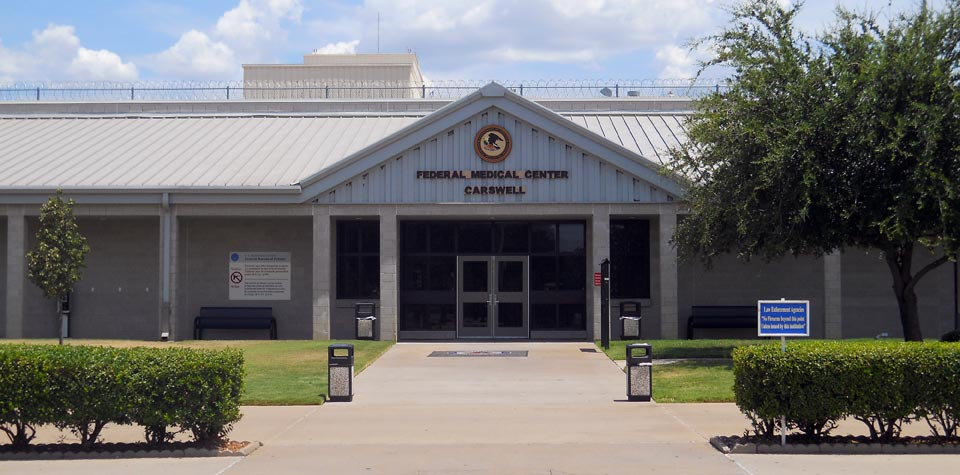
Federal Medical Center, Carswell, where Siddiqui is currently located

Siddiqui was sentenced to 86 years in prison by Judge Berman on 23 September 2010. During the sentencing hearing, which lasted one hour, Siddiqui spoke on her own behalf.

A reporter for The New York Times wrote that at times during the hearing Judge Berman seemed to be speaking to an audience beyond the courtroom in an apparent attempt to address widespread speculation about Siddiqui and her case. He gave as an example a reference to the five-year period before her 2008 arrest of Siddiqui's disappearance and claims of torture, where the judge said: "I am aware of no evidence in the record to substantiate these allegations or to establish them as fact. There is no credible evidence in the record that the United States officials and/or agencies detained Dr. Siddiqui". In sentencing her, Berman repeated the prosecution witnesses' claim that while she shot at Americans with an M-4 rifle she had said "I want to kill Americans" and "Death to America". Siddiqui said she forgave the soldier who had shot her, as well as the judge. She told the court: "I am a Muslim, but I do love America, too. I do not want any bloodshed. I really want to make peace and end the wars."

At the time of sentencing, Siddiqui did not show any interest in filing an appeal, instead saying "I appeal to God and he hears me." After she was sentenced, she urged forgiveness and asked the public not to take any action in retaliation. She stated, "forgive everybody in my case, please ... Don't get angry. If I'm not angry, why should anyone else be?" In a notably gracious exchange between the bestower and recipient of an 80+ year sentence of incarceration, the judge wished her "the very best going forward", and both Siddiqui and the judge thanked each other.

=== Imprisonment ===
Siddiqui (Federal Bureau of Prisons #90279-054) was originally held at Metropolitan Detention Center, Brooklyn. She is now being held in Federal Medical Center, Carswell in Fort Worth, Texas, a federal prison for female inmates with special mental health needs, and also relatively close to the home of her brother Ali Siddiqui. Her release date is 30 June 2082. She was visited by her sister Fowzia Siddiqui in May 2023, accompanied by human rights lawyer Clive Stafford Smith and Jamaat-e-Islami senator Mushtaq Ahmad Khan.

=== Children ===
According to Arab News, Pakistan's president, Asif Ali Zardari, had personally requested Afghanistan's president Hamid Karzai return Siddiqui's children to their family in Pakistan. In the summer of 2008 Aafia and a teenage boy were reported to have been apprehended by Afghan police. It was later confirmed that the teenage boy was her eldest son. On 26 August 2008, the United States Department of State confirmed that the youth captured with Aafia Siddiqui on 17 July 2008 was her son, American citizen Ahmed Siddiqui. Ahmed was transferred to the custody of Pakistani security officials. Joanne Mariner, then Director of the Terrorism and Counterterrorism Program at Human Rights Watch, criticized Afghanistan officials for transferring Ahmed to the National Directorate of Security due to its reputation for using torture as an interrogation tool. Mariner pointed out that under Afghan law Ahmed was too young to be held criminally responsible. Ahmed was released from Afghanistan to his aunt in Pakistan following enormous outcry from the Pakistani public and politicians. While Pakistani law would normally give his father custody, his father did not want to fight the passionate public opinion supporting his aunt Fowzia. As of November 2009, he was living with his aunt in Karachi; Fowzia prohibited him from talking to the press at that time.

In late August 2010, British journalist Yvonne Ridley, who had first reported that Aafia and her children had been held in the Bagram Theater internment facility reported that she had acquired a statement taken from Ahmed in 2008. She reported that the statement was taken from Ahmed by an American official when he was released. The statement is the first from Ahmed. The statement is the first to appear to confirm Aafia's dream that her youngest child was dead. The statement, as quoted by Ridley, read:

I do not remember the date but it seems a long time ago i remember we were going to Islamabad in a car when we were stopped by different cars and high roof ones. My mother was screaming and I was screaming as they took me away, I looked around and saw my baby brother on the ground and there was blood. My mother was crying and screaming. Then they put something on my face. I smelt and don't remember anything.

I woke up I was in a room. There were American soldiers in uniform and plain clothes people. They kept me in different places. If I cried or didn't listen, they beat me and tied me and chained me. There were English speaking, Pashto and Urdu speaking. I had no courage to ask who they were. At times, for a long time, I was alone in a small room. Then I was taken to some children's prison where there were lots of other children.

The American Consular [sic], who came to me in Kabul jail, said, 'Your name is Ahmed. You are American. Your mother's name is Aafia Siddiqui and your younger brother is dead. After that they took me away from the kids' prison and I met the Pakistani consular [sic], and I talked to my aunt (Fowzia Siddiqui).

When a girl who may have been his younger sister Maryam was returned to the Ahmed's family, tests to confirm her identity were inconclusive. His aunt Fowzia expressed doubt that the girl was her niece Maryam. In April 2010, Pakistan Interior Minister Rehman Malik claimed a 12-year-old girl found outside a house in Karachi was identified by DNA as Siddiqui's daughter, Mariyam, and that she had been returned to her family. The Daily Times reported that the girl was only able to speak English and Dari, a dialect of the Persian language, and that when Ahmed was returned he too could only speak English and Dari.

== Reactions ==
=== Attacks and threats ===
For al-Qaeda and Pakistani jihadi groups, Siddiqui's case became a "rallying cry" and they joined in accusing the Pakistani government and military of failing to protect and avenge her.

According to a video released by Hakimullah Mehsud, head of the TTP (Tehreek e Taliban Pakistan) at the time, the 2009 Camp Chapman attack in Afghanistan that killed seven CIA officers was partly in revenge for Aafia's imprisonment. The 2010 Times Square car bombing attempt occurred one day after Mehsud released another video promising to avenge Siddiqui. The perpetrator of the attempt was Faisal Shahzad, a recently naturalized Pakistan-born citizen who had contacts with Jaish-e-Muhammad and Hakimullah Mehsud.

According to a February 2010 report in the Pakistani newspaper The News International, the Taliban threatened to execute US soldier Bowe Bergdahl, whom they had captured on 30 June 2009 in retaliation for Siddiqui's conviction. A Taliban spokesperson claimed that members of Siddiqui's family had requested help from the Taliban to obtain her release from prison in the US. Bergdahl was released on 31 May 2014 in exchange for five Guantanamo Bay detainees.

In September 2010, the Taliban kidnapped Linda Norgrove, a Scottish aid worker in Afghanistan, and Taliban commanders insisted Norgrove would be handed over only in exchange for Siddiqui. On 8 October 2010, Norgrove was accidentally killed during a rescue attempt by a grenade thrown by one of her rescuers.

In July 2011, then-deputy of the Tehrik-i-Taliban Pakistan, Waliur Rehman, announced that they wanted to swap Siddiqui for two Swiss citizens abducted in Balochistan. The Swiss couple escaped in March 2012.

In December 2011, al-Qaeda leader Ayman al-Zawahiri demanded the release of Siddiqui in exchange for Warren Weinstein, an American aid worker kidnapped in Pakistan on 13 August 2011. Weinstein was accidentally killed in a drone strike in January 2015.

In January 2013, al-Qaeda-linked terrorists involved in the Algerian In Amenas hostage crisis listed the release of Siddiqui as one of their demands.

In June 2013, the captors of two Czech women kidnapped in Pakistan demanded the release of Siddiqui in exchange for the two captives. Both Czech women were released in March 2015, following intense negotiations by a Turkish NGO IHH.

In August 2014, it was reported that the terrorist who claimed responsibility for the beheading of U.S. photojournalist James Foley mentioned Siddiqui in an email to Foley's family. Siddiqui was identified in the email as one of the Muslim "sisters" the Islamic State was purportedly willing to swap as part of a prisoner exchange with the United States.

In February 2015, Paul Gosar said the family of Kayla Mueller had been told plans to swap her for Siddiqui were underway in the months before her death. ISIS had also demanded $6.6 million in exchange for Mueller.

In March 2017, Al-Qaeda in the Arabian Peninsula leader Qasim al-Raymi said that his group demanded the release of Siddiqui in exchange for Luke Somers, an American journalist kidnapped in Yemen in September 2013. Somers was killed during a rescue attempt in December 2014.

In January 2022, a man claiming to be Siddiqui's brother took hostages at the Beth Israel synagogue in Colleyville, Texas, near where she is imprisoned, and demanded her release. He was later shot and killed by police, and the hostages were rescued.

=== Pakistan ===
Her case has been called a "flashpoint of Pakistani-American tensions", and "one of the most mysterious in a secret war dense with mysteries". The case was covered very differently in Pakistan than in the United States.

After Siddiqui's conviction, she sent a message through her lawyer, saying that she does not want "violent protests or violent reprisals in Pakistan over this verdict." Thousands of students, political and social activists protested in Pakistan. Some shouted anti-American slogans, while burning the American flag and effigies of President Barack Obama in the streets. Her sister, Fowzia, has spoken frequently and passionately on her behalf at rallies. Echoing her family's comments and anti-US sentiment, many believe she was detained in Karachi in 2003, held at the US Bagram Airbase and tortured, and that the charges against her were fabricated.

Her conviction was followed with expressions of support by many Pakistanis, who appeared increasingly anti-American, as well as by politicians and the news media, who characterised her as a symbol of victimisation by the United States. Graffiti "Free Dr. Aafia" appeared "even in remote areas" of the country.

The Pakistani Embassy in Washington, D.C., expressed its dismay over the verdict, which followed "intense diplomatic and legal efforts on her behalf. [We] will consult the family of Dr. Aafia Siddiqui and the team of defence lawyers to determine the future course of action." Prime Minister Gilani described Siddiqui as a "daughter of the nation," and opposition leader Nawaz Sharif promised to push for her release. Shireen Mazari, editor of the Pakistani newspaper The Nation, wrote that the verdict "did not really surprise anyone familiar with the vindictive mindset of the U.S. public post-9/11".

A few Pakistanis questioned the outpouring of support. Her ex-husband said Siddiqui was "reaping the fruit of her own decision. Her family has been portraying Aafia as a victim. We would like the truth to come out." Shakil Chaudhry lamented the "mass hysteria" of supporters. But when one columnist (Mubashir Lucman) raised questions about Aafia's sister Fowzia's account, graffiti "appeared all over Karachi insulting" him.

U.S. observers noted the Pakistani reaction. Jessica Eve Stern, a terrorism specialist and lecturer at Harvard Law School, observed: "Whatever the truth is, this case is of great political importance because of how people [in Pakistan] view her." Foreign Policy reported that unsubstantiated rumours, widely repeated in the Pakistani press, that she had been sexually abused by her captors had "become part of the legend that surrounds her, so much so that they are repeated as established facts by her supporters, who have helped build her iconic status" as a folk hero. According to The New York Times,

There is no doubt that the case of an ultraconservative, educated middle-class Pakistani woman who shunned the ways of the West and defied America has resonated with the Pakistani public. ... All of this has taken place with little national soul-searching about the contradictory and frequently damning circumstances surrounding Ms. Siddiqui, who is suspected of having had links to Al Qaeda and the banned jihadi group Jaish-e-Muhammad. Instead, the Pakistani news media have broadly portrayed her trial as a "farce", and an example of the injustices meted out to Muslims by the United States since Sept. 11, 2001.

Journalist Scroggins complained about the lack of curiosity and investigation by Pakistani public and press of a number of questions about the case—how Siddiqui's daughter Maryam turned up at her grandmother's house and where she had been, what connection the "Karachi Institute of Technology", and the cleric Abu Lubaba had had with Aafia. She noted that while thousands of Pakistanis had been killed by bomb and assassinations in tribal areas, in contrast to the rage against the US, no rallies were held in protest of jihadi attacks (Scroggins argued) because Pakistanis were fearful of them.

== Repatriation efforts ==
In August 2009, Pakistani Prime Minister Yusuf Raza Gilani met with Siddiqui's sister at his residence and assured her that Pakistan would seek Siddiqui's release from the US. The Pakistani government paid $2 million for the services of three lawyers to assist in the defense of Siddiqui during her trial. Many Siddiqui supporters were present during the proceedings, and outside the court dozens of people rallied to demand her release.

In February 2010, President Asif Ali Zardari requested of Richard Holbrooke, US Special Envoy to Afghanistan and Pakistan, that the US consider repatriating Siddiqui to Pakistan under the Pakistan-US Prisoner Exchange Agreement. On 22 February, the Pakistani Senate urged the government to work towards her immediate release.

In September 2010, Pakistan Interior Minister Rehman Malik sent a letter to the United States Attorney General calling for repatriation of Siddiqui to Pakistan. He said that the case of Siddiqui had become a matter of public concern in Pakistan and her repatriation would create goodwill for the US.

In July 2019, after meeting with United States President Donald Trump, Pakistani Prime Minister Imran Khan told the media that releasing Shakeel Afridi in exchange for Siddiqui was a possibility.

On 6 July 2024, the Islamabad High Court ruled that the government must create a plan to repatriate Siddiqui by 26 August. On 2 November, Attorney General of Pakistan Mansoor Usman Awan informed the Islamabad High Court that a Pakistani delegation is scheduled to visit the United States following the presidential elections to negotiate the release of Siddiqui.

On 17 September 2024, Siddiqui's lawyers filed a clemency petition with US President Joe Biden, seeking her release, or her exchange for Dr. Shakeel Afridi. The petition runs to 56,600 words, canvassing the whole history of her case. Her lawyers also filed an extensive analysis of her prison record, reflecting the failure by the Bureau of Prisons to provide her with basic medical care, as well as the various punishments imposed upon her for claiming to be the victim of rape – punishments that her lawyers claim were imposed on a whistleblower in violation of the Prison Rape Elimination Act (PREA).

On 11 July 2025, the Islamabad High Court (IHC) issued a warning to the federal government, including Prime Minister Shehbaz Sharif and cabinet members, over repeated non-compliance in the Siddiqui case. Justice Sardar Ejaz Ishaq Khan, presiding over a petition filed by Fouzia Siddiqui, expressed serious displeasure at the government's failure to submit a report explaining its refusal to assist in legal proceedings related to Dr. Siddiqui’s case in the United States. The court questioned why contempt proceedings should not be initiated against the entire cabinet, including the Prime Minister.

On 21 July 2025, the court proceeded with the issuance of contempt notices to Shehbaz and the members of his cabinet for failing to submit a response in Siddiqui's case. All members of the federal government were made respondents in the contempt petition, with the replies of all the ministers, including Shehbaz, being sought within two weeks.

== See also ==
- Anti-American sentiment in Pakistan

== Bibliography ==
- Scroggins, Deborah (17 January 2012). Wanted Women: Faith, Lies, and the War on Terror: The Lives of Ayaan Hirsi Ali and Aafia Siddiqui. New York: Harper. ISBN 978-0-06-209795-8.
