= Foreign hostages in Pakistan =

This is a list of known foreign hostages in Pakistan.

Foreign nationals have often been abducted by various militant groups who are involved in the current War in North-West Pakistan and are linked to terrorism in Pakistan. Most of these kidnappings have taken place in unstable parts of northwestern Pakistan and the western province of Balochistan, that are plagued by an insurgency. Eastern provinces particularly Sindh, especially the city of Karachi, have also witnessed large numbers of kidnappings due to conflict. Kidnappings are usually done by insurgent or terrorist groups mainly the Pakistani Taliban and Al Qaeda but also various crime syndicates, especially in Karachi.

== Canada ==
=== Died (1) ===
- Beverly Anne Giesbrecht, was a Canadian journalist, who was kidnapped along with her Pakistani translator, Salman Khan, and her Pakistani driver, Zar Muhammad, near the Afghanistan-Pakistan border on November 11, 2008. In late February 2009, a video surfaced of her, in between two men with rifles. In March 2009, a video surfaced on which Giesbrecht could be heard stating that the Pakistani Taliban would behead her unless a ransom was paid. Muhammad was freed in June 2009. Khan was freed in July 2009. Giesbrecht died in captivity somewhere in Pakistan, due to hepatitis, in October 2010.

=== Killed (1) ===
- Rajvinder Kaur Gill was a Canadian Sikh woman of Indian origin who had travelled to Pakistan to meet a prospective groom, in 2012. She had disappeared from Lahore, Pakistan. In 2017, a Pakistani court acquitted a man accused of her killing, due to lack of evidence.

== China ==
=== Rescued (1) ===
- Wang Ende: Two Chinese engineers working at the Gomal Zam Dam were kidnapped along with their Pakistani driver and Pakistani bodyguard in South Waziristan along the Afghanistan border on October 10, 2004. The driver and bodyguard were later released. Pakistani forces managed to rescue one of the engineers several days later but the other engineer was killed during the rescue attempt.

=== Killed (3) ===
- Wang Peng: Two Chinese engineers working at the Gomal Zam Dam were kidnapped along with their Pakistani driver and Pakistani bodyguard in South Waziristan along the Afghanistan border on October 10, 2004. The driver and bodyguard were later released. Pakistani forces managed to rescue one of the engineers several days later but the other engineer was killed during the rescue attempt.
- Li Xinheng and Meng Lisi: Two Chinese language teachers, were kidnapped in Quetta by armed gunmen on May 24, 2017. A bystander who attempted to intervene was shot and wounded while rescuing a third person. On June 8, 2017, the Islamic State announced that they had killed the Chinese hostages and sent video to the phones of journalists working in Baluchistan, which showed two bodies shot and bleeding on some grassy ground.

== Czech Republic ==
=== Released (2) ===
- Hana Humpálová and Antonie Chrástecká, were two Czech travelers who were kidnapped near Pakistan's western border along with a Pakistani police officer on March 14, 2013. The officer was later released. Both women were on an overland trip from Europe to India. The kidnappers demanded the release of Aafia Siddiqui. Both Czech women were released in March 2015, following intense negotiations by a Turkish NGO IHH. In February 2016, Czech President Milos Zeman confirmed that a $6 million ransom was paid for the women's release.

== Germany ==
=== Released (2) ===
- Bernd Muehlenbeck, was an aid worker who worked for Welthungerhilfe alongside Giovanni Lo Porto who were both kidnapped on January 19, 2012, by al-Qaeda in Multan, in Punjab province. Muehlenbeck appeared in proof of life videos released just before Christmas 2012 and in February 2014. Muehlenbeck was freed from inside Afghanistan in October 2014. Lo Porto was killed in an American drone strike in January 2015. His body was recovered in August 2015.
- A German woman (name withheld), and a Swiss man were kidnapped on February 10, 2021, by a man identified as Rana Irfan. They were later released by him when he received a ransom of 10.5 Million PKR in Bitcoin, and then fled to Germany with the money.

== Italy ==
=== Killed (1) ===
- Giovanni Lo Porto, was an aid worker who worked for Welthungerhilfe alongside Bernd Muehlenbeck who were both kidnapped on January 19, 2012, by al-Qaeda in Multan, in Punjab province. Muehlenbeck appeared in proof of life videos released just before Christmas 2012 and in February 2014. Muehlenbeck was freed from inside Afghanistan in October 2014. Lo Porto was accidentally killed in an American drone strike in January 2015. His body was recovered in August 2015.

== Poland ==
=== Killed (1) ===
- Piotr Stańczak, was a Polish engineer and geologist who was kidnapped by unknown gunmen in the city of Attock on September 28, 2008. The gunmen shot dead his Pakistani driver, Pakistani translator and Pakistani bodyguard with whom he was travelling in a car. Stańczak was beheaded by militants on 7 February 2009, with a video of the execution released. His executioners said they murdered Stańczak because of the Pakistani government's failure to release Taliban prisoners.

== Switzerland ==
=== Escaped (2) ===
- A Swiss tourist couple was abducted, while travelling in Balochistan on July 1, 2011. The couple were seized by unidentified gunmen affiliated with the Pakistani Taliban in the Loralai District, which is some 150 km north of the provincial capital Quetta. The couple escaped in March 2012.

=== Released (1) ===
- A Swiss man (name withheld), and a German woman were kidnapped on February 10, 2021, by a man identified as Rana Irfan. They were later released by him when he received a ransom of 10.5 Million PKR in Bitcoin, and then fled to Germany with the money.

== United States ==
=== Released (1) ===
- John Solecki, was an American official working for the UNHCR in Quetta when he was kidnapped by a Baloch terrorist group named Baluch Liberation United Front (BLUF) on February 2, 2009. His Pakistani driver was shot and later he died because of his injuries. Solecki was released on April 4, 2009. He was in the captivity of BLUF for a period of 61 days. While he was in their captivity, BLUF had repeatedly threatened to behead him.

=== Killed (2) ===
- Daniel Pearl, was a Jewish American journalist was kidnapped in Karachi by a militant group on January 23, 2002. He was tortured and beheaded nine days later.
- Warren Weinstein, was an American aid worker living in Lahore who was kidnapped from his residence by unknown gunmen on August 13, 2011. In December 2011, al-Qaeda leader Ayman al-Zawahiri claimed to be holding him in FATA. Weinstein was accidentally killed in an American drone strike in January 2015.

== See also ==
- Foreign hostages in Afghanistan
