= Giovanni Lo Porto =

Italian humanitarian worker (1977–2015)

- Born: 23 June 1977
- Died: 15 January 2015 (aged 37); Waziristan, Pakistan
- Occupation: Aid worker

Giovanni Lo Porto (23 June 1977 – 15 January 2015) was an Italian aid worker. In January 2012, he was abducted by militants while working in the Pakistani city of Multan, along with a German colleague, Bernd Muehlenbeck. Muehlenbeck was later freed inside Afghanistan. Lo Porto was accidentally killed in one of a series of unmanned aircraft strikes in Waziristan, Pakistan, along with American contractor Warren Weinstein, and American al Qaeda leaders Ahmad Farooq and Adam Gadahn.

== Biography ==
In January 2012, he was kidnapped by militants while working for the German NGO Welt Hunger Hilfe in the Pakistani city of Multan, along with a German colleague, Bernd Muehlenbeck. Muehlenbeck was later released in October 2014 in Afghanistan. Three months later, Lo Porto was killed in a targeted assassination carried out by a US drone on the border between Afghanistan and Pakistan, while he was being held hostage, together with US businessman Warren Weinstein. A ransom was demanded for the return of their bodies. The attack also killed Al-Qaeda leaders Ahmed Farouq and Adam Yahiye Gadahn, both US citizens. President Barack Obama publicly apologized for his death.

Although the judiciary opened a file to investigate the real causes of death, in 2017 the public prosecutor ordered the investigation to be closed due to a lack of cooperation from the American authorities. The case is linked to the difficulties already encountered in the investigation of the Nicola Calipari case. The US government simply awarded the family compensation of one million dollars but did not promise to cooperate with the investigation. The identification of the body once it arrived in Italy remains controversial, as DNA testing was carried out only by the government and relatives were not allowed to identify it directly. All remains, including clothing, were cremated.

== See also ==
- Foreign hostages in Pakistan
