= Majid Khan (detainee) =

Pakistani detainee (born 1980)

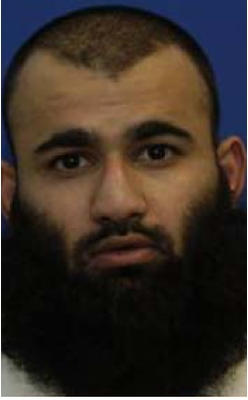
- Khan in 2008
- Born: Majid Shoukat Khan; February 28, 1980 (age 46); Saudi Arabia
- Arrested: March 5, 2003; Karachi, Pakistan
- Released: February 2, 2023; Belize
- Citizenship: Pakistan
- Detained at: Pakistan, CIA black sites, Guantanamo
- ISN: 10020
- Charge(s): Five war crimes, including murder, attempted murder and spying
- Status: Pleaded guilty

Majid Shoukat Khan (Urdu: ماجد شوکت خان, born February 28, 1980) is a Pakistani who was the only known legal resident of the United States held in the Guantanamo Bay Detainment Camp. He was a "high value detainee".

Khan originally came to the United States in 1998, where he gained asylum. He lived in a suburb of Baltimore, Maryland where he attended high school and became radicalized. He returned to his native Pakistan after the 9/11 attacks to join Al Qaeda and worked for them as a courier, according to the BBC, The Progressive, and The New York Times. Pakistani authorities captured him in 2003 and handed him over to the CIA who held him incognito in a black site in Afghanistan, interrogating him and subjecting him to “the most horrific torture.” In 2006 he was sent to Guantanamo, where in 2012 he pleaded guilty to conspiracy and the murder of 11 innocent civilians in the 2003 Marriott Hotel bombing in Jakarta, Indonesia, and also for the attempted assassination of Pakistan President Pervez Musharraf. He also began cooperating with the U.S. government. In 2021 he was sentenced by Guantanamo Military Commission retroactively to 26 years in prison. His sentence was completed on March 1, 2022, and after Belize agreed to accept him he was released from Guantanamo Bay to that country on February 2, 2023.

== Early life ==
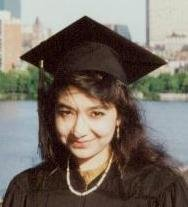
Aafia Siddiqui, 2011

Khan's family settled in Catonsville, Maryland, near Baltimore, where he attended Owings Mills High School and was "exposed to radical Islam". He was granted asylum in the U.S. in 1998, and graduated the following year.

In 2002, Khan returned to Pakistan, where he married 18-year-old Rabia Yaqoub. According to Deborah Scroggins, author of Wanted Women, Khan had become more religious, after his mother's death, and had asked his aunt to help him find a wife who was also a religious scholar. Rabia was one of his aunt's students. According to The New York Times, it was then he became a courier for Al Qaeda.

He returned to the United States for a short period to continue his work as a database administrator in a Maryland government office. He claims that he helped the FBI investigate and arrest an illegal immigrant from Pakistan during this time.

On December 25, 2002, Aafia Siddiqui made a trip from Pakistan to the U.S., saying that she was looking for a job. She left the U.S. on January 2, 2003. The FBI suspects that the real purpose of her trip was to open a P.O. box for Khan. Siddiqui registered Khan as co-owner of the box, claiming he was her husband. The key to the box was later found held by Uzair Paracha, who was convicted of providing material support to al-Qaeda and was sentenced to 30 years in federal prison in 2006; fifteen years after his arrest, Uzair's conviction was deemed void on July 3, 2018, by Judge Sidney H. Stein, based on newly discovered statements made by Ammar al-Baluchi, Majid Khan (detainee) and Khalid Sheikh Mohammed, bringing his involvement and intentions into question.

== Arrest and detention ==
Detainee Assessment written in Guantànamo Prison in 2008

Khan returned to Pakistan on March 5, 2003. He, his brother Mohammed, and other relatives were arrested at their residence in Karachi by Pakistani security agents and taken into custody. Khan and his family were taken to an unknown location. After about a month, the entire family, with the exception of Khan, was released. Rabia Khan and the rest of his family heard nothing of his whereabouts for three years. Then, in September 2006, President George W. Bush announced that Khan, along with 13 other so-called "high value detainees", had been transferred from secret CIA prisons to military custody at Guantánamo Bay detention camp to await prosecution under the new military tribunal system authorized by the Military Commissions Act of 2006.

== Legal issues ==
Khan was the first of the fourteen high-value detainees to challenge his detention in court. The Center for Constitutional Rights filed the habeas corpus challenge on October 5, 2006 — before President Bush signed the Military Commissions Act of 2006 into law.

But, the Military Commissions Act of 2006 restricted detainees from mounting challenges through U.S. courts and was retroactive. The Center for Constitutional Rights and others argued against this act before the U.S. Supreme Court in Boumediene v. Bush on December 5, 2007. Justice Kennedy held in the case that the MCA could not deny detainees and other petitioners, including Khan, their right to petition United States courts for writ of habeas corpus.

=== Allegations ===
In the government's account, Khan was exposed to a radicalized element of Islam while in the United States. Khan allegedly began attending secret prayer meetings at Baltimore's Islamic Society, where he was recruited by individuals who sought out disaffected young people. U.S. officials assert that Khan's first trip to Pakistan connected him to family members affiliated with Al-Qaeda. According to officials, these family members introduced Khan to Khalid Sheikh Mohammed (KSM), the man accused of orchestrating the September 11, 2001 attacks. Allegedly Mohammed later enlisted Khan in helping to support and plan terrorist attacks against the U.S. and Israel.

Government officials assert that Khan, under KSM's tutelage, was being trained to blow up gas stations and poison water reservoirs, and that he plotted to assassinate Pakistani President General Pervez Musharraf. Khan's job at the family gas station played a role in the suspicions of U.S. intelligence analysts that he was part of a plot to blow up parts of the U.S. petroleum infrastructure. The U.S. government contends that Khan was aware that his visit to family in Pakistan in 2002 violated the terms of his asylum granted in 1998.

The Office of the Director of National Intelligence (ODNI) asserted that Khan helped Khalid Sheikh Mohammed (mastermind of the September 11th attacks) plan attacks against gas stations and water reservoirs in the United States. ODNI alleges Khan was first introduced to al Qaeda through family and that Khan's experience working in his family's gas station "made Khan highly qualified to assist Mohammad with the research and planning to blow up gas stations."

=== Legal challenge to government ===
Khan's attorneys at the Center for Constitutional Rights insist that he was tortured, subjected to cruel, inhuman, or degrading treatment, and coerced into making false and unreliable confessions.

Khan's appeal points out that although he had been in U.S. custody for more than three and a half years, he had never had any kind of review of the legality of his detention. Khan's attorneys at CCR petitioned to have his case tried in civilian court in the United States instead of by military tribunal at Guantanamo. A federal appeals court ruled in February 2007 that detainees at Guantanamo Bay could not use the U.S. court system to challenge their indefinite imprisonment.

=== Access to legal counsel ===
The Center for Constitutional Rights argued against the government's efforts to deny CCR attorneys access to Khan in a response brief filed November 3, 2006. In the brief, CCR argued that efforts by the Bush administration to deny Khan access to counsel, "ignores the Court's historical function under Article III of the Constitution to exercise its independent judgment," and used its classification authority to hide illegal conduct when the court had sufficient tools to prevent disclosure of sensitive classified information.

On November 4, 2006, the Justice Department said that Khan should not be allowed to speak to an attorney because he might "reveal the agency's closely guarded interrogation techniques".

James Friedman, a professor at the Maine School of Law, wrote that the Bush administration is arguing that Khan, and the other high-value detainees held in the Black Sites, should be gagged from talking about the interrogation techniques they were exposed to, even when talking privately to their own lawyers. Friedman pointed out, "His combatant status was never reviewed as required by the U.S. Supreme Court in Hamdi v. Rumsfeld (2004) nor as outlined in the Detainee Treatment Act of 2005."

According to an article by Christopher Brauchli:

- Kathleen Blomquist, a Justice Department Spokeswoman explains:

information regarding the former C.I.A. detainees [like Mr. Khan] was classified as top secret. She said the information he shares with his counsel should "be appropriately tailored to accommodate a higher security level."

- The D.I.A. told the court that if Mr. Khan told just any person what the [interrogation] procedures were, it would cause "extremely grave damage to the national security."
- Marilyn A. Dorn, an official at the National Clandestine Service, part of the CIA, told the court that

If specific alternative techniques were disclosed, it would permit terrorist organizations to adapt their training to counter the tactics that C.I.A. can employ in interrogations.

=== Habeas corpus submission ===
Khan is one of 16 Guantanamo captives whose amalgamated habeas corpus submissions were heard by U.S. District Court Judge Reggie B. Walton on January 31, 2007. Walton ruled that the cases be administratively closed (or stayed) until the District of Columbia Circuit resolved the issue of jurisdiction.

Pakistan's International News reported Khan's wife's lawyer told the Sindh High Court that she was not informed that Khan was in U.S. custody for the first three years after he disappeared.

== Timeline of Majid Khan's Combatant Status Review Tribunal ==
February 7, 2007	The Summary of Evidence memos prepared for most of the other 14 high value detainees' Tribunals were finalized on February 7, 2007.
March 28, 2007	The version of the Summary of Evidence memo released for Majid Khan's Tribunal is dated March 28, 2007.
April 15, 2007	Majid Khan requested the testimony of his brother and father, because the allegations against him quoted them.; His relatives, who were political refugees in the United States, were told that if they left the United States to testify on Majid Khan's behalf, they would not be guaranteed re-entry into the United States.; The unclassified sessions of his Tribunal convened on April 15, 2007. His tribunal reportedly sat for a further four days in classified session.
May 15, 2007	The Summary of Evidence memo, and the verbatim transcript, were not made public until May 15, 2007.

The first 558 Combatant Status Review Tribunals were convened in a 3 x 5 meter trailer. The captive's hands and feet were shackled to a bolt in the floor. The three chairs on the left hand side constituted the press gallery. The press was not allowed to attend the Tribunals of the 14 high-value detainees. Thirty-seven of the 558 earlier tribunals were observed by the press.

The press release quoted from Gitanjali Gutierrez, Khan's lawyer:

The government is denying Majid any access to his attorneys solely to keep his torture and abuse secret, even from his lawyers, His father's testimony sheds light on the U.S. government's system of secret detention and makes clear that U.S. officials are trying to hide their own criminal conduct.

According to the press release, Khan's Tribunal was scheduled to start on April 10, 2007, and to finish by April 13, 2007. Ali Khan made the affidavit on April 6, 2007, when the family confirmed they would not be allowed to testify in person.

According to Department of Defense spokesman Commander Jeffrey Gordon, Khan's Tribunal concluded April 15, 2007.

The Department of Defense announced on August 9, 2007 that all 14 of the "high-value detainees" who had been transferred to Guantanamo from the CIA's black sites, had been officially classified as "enemy combatants". Although judges Peter Brownback and Keith J. Allred had ruled two months earlier that only "illegal enemy combatants" could face military commissions, the Department of Defense waived the qualifier and said that all 14 men could now face charges before Guantanamo military commissions.

== Legal action ==
=== First meeting with a lawyer ===
On October 15, 2007, Gitanjali Gutierrez, a CCR attorney, wrote about her pending first meeting with Majid Khan. Khan was the first of the "high value detainees" to meet with a lawyer.

=== Order to preserve evidence ===
In December 2007, a Federal appeals court in Washington DC ordered the Department of Defense to preserve evidence in Khan's case. The motion predated reporting that, contrary to earlier claims by the government, the CIA had taped the interrogations of Abu Zubaydah and Abdul Al Nashiri, including their waterboarding in 2002, and destroyed those tapes. A court order of late 2005 had ordered the government not to destroy such evidence. In an e-mail to The Washington Post Wells Dixon, one of Khan's lawyers, wrote:

The order is significant because the D.C. circuit would have no reason to issue interim relief, by its own initiative, if it were absolutely certain that no torture evidence would be lost or destroyed before the preservation motion is fully briefed and decided on the merits.

The CIA denied that it had tortured Khan or any other captive. Dixon said:

At a bare minimum, General Hayden is not fully informed about the CIA torture program.

The Baltimore Sun quoted a CIA spokesman, George Little, who repeated that the CIA stood by its assertion that it had stopped videotaping captives' interrogations in 2002. But Khan's lawyers said their client's interrogations had been taped more recently than that.

=== Motion to declare torture ===
A motion filed by the Center for Constitutional Rights was declassified in redacted form in December 2007. This motion aims for the Court of Appeals to declare that interrogation methods used against Majid Khan by the CIA "constitute torture and other forms of impermissible coercion."

The government's response to the motion was due to the court on December 20, 2009.

The CCR attorneys Dixon Wells and Gita S. Gutierrez released some of their declassified notes from their conversations with Majid Khan in November 2007. They included the following:

- He chewed through the artery in his left arm until it bled in January 2007 and still had a scar.
- He was on hunger strikes to protest for his rights to see his lawyers and to protest his conditions and being kept in isolation. Hunger strikes were the only way he knew to assert his rights. He said a teacher at Owings Mills High School had taught him about checks and balances, and he learned that if you do not assert and protect your rights, you do not deserve to be in the United States.
- Khan went on hunger strike to get a subscription to The Washington Post.
- When meeting Khan for the first time, the attorneys initially thought the guards had brought the wrong detainee, which had happened in the past. But he had lost so much weight that they did not recognize him. He looked at them and said, "Dixon? Gita? I've been waiting a long time to meet you. It's good to see you."
- He is suffering from symptoms of post-traumatic stress disorder, including concentration, memory loss, and frantic expression.
- He said he wished he had gone to college.

=== Petition of habeas corpus ===
A petition of habeas corpus was filed on Khan's behalf on September 29, 2006.

On July 22, 2008, J. Wells Dixon, Gitanjali S. Gutierrez, Shayana D. Kadidal, of the Center for Constitutional Rights, filed a "petitioner's status report" on behalf of Majid Khan, in Civil Action No. 06-1690, Majid Khan v. George W. Bush.

On August 1, 2008, Dixon filed a "Motion for Order directing the Court Security Office to file supplemental status report". He wrote that a Detainee Treatment Act appeal had been initiated on Khan's behalf. His motion said that in contrast to other captives' DTA appeals, the Department of Justice was not agreeing to allow exculpatory information prepared for his appeal to be made available for use on his habeas petition.

=== Declaration of sentence completed ===
Via "The Guantánamo Docket" published by The New York Times:

A senior Pentagon official declared his sentence complete on March 1, 2022. His lawyers argue that expiration of his sentence means he should be promptly released, although the U.S. had yet to reach a deal with a country to receive him.

== Accusations against U.S. ==
Iyman Faris told authorities that Khan had referred to Khalid Sheikh Mohammed as an "uncle" and spoken of a desire to kill Pakistan President Pervez Musharraf. Faris later said that his accusations had been "an absolute lie" that he had been coerced into making. Khan made repeated offers to submit to a polygraph test to prove his innocence, but was turned down.

Khan was represented by the Center for Constitutional Rights and is one of few so-called "high value detainees" to have legal representation. He has attempted suicide six times while in detention. He complained in writing of having his beard forcibly shaved (in violation of his religious practice) and spending weeks without sunlight; he also complained that detainees are expected to wash with "cheap branded, unscented soap", and that he is forced to read the "poor quality" Joint Task Force Guantanamo's weekly newsletter The Wire.

== Letters from Guantanamo ==
Khan is the first of the 14 high-value detainees to get mail to his relatives. The Washington Post reported that four letters from Khan had been received, three to his relatives in Maryland, and one to his wife. The letters were delivered to his family through the International Committee of the Red Cross. Its contact with detainees is contingent on the agency's promise not to publicly disclose any information received during the meetings, which is its standard process. Khan's letter to his wife was written in Urdu and was published on the BBC's Urdu web site. Khan's Maryland relatives also decided to make the letters public to bring more attention to his case. These letters, written on December 17, 2007, and December 21, 2007, were made public on January 18, 2008. The letters were filed as part of a petition in the Washington DC Federal Court of Appeal. The petition asks the court "to rule that he was tortured in U.S. custody." According to The Washington Post, Khan's letters were heavily redacted by military censors.

Khan wrote that he was in solitary confinement, but he could talk to nearby captives through the cell walls. Once a day he is permitted to leave his cell "to get sunburn" during an hour of solitary access in an exercise yard. His relatives said the letters showed he had become much more religious.

According to The Baltimore Sun:

In one five-page handwritten account from Khan to his lawyers, only a single sentence survives the censor's pen. It says, 'I was practically an American who lived a comfortable live [sic] under freedoms of America, who never lived in caves or Afghanistan.'

Other quotes from Khan's letters include:

- "Think of me as a human being ... not a terrorist."
- "I ask you to give me justice ... in the name of what U.S.A. once stood for and in the name of what Thomas Jefferson fought for ... allow me a chance to prove that I am innocent."
- "Why would I ever want to harm U.S.A., who has never done anything but good to me and my family?"

The Baltimore Sun reported that Khan said that when he lived in the United States, he paid $2,400 per month in U.S. taxes. It also reported that the only other captive he had any contact with since he arrived in Guantanamo was Abu Zubaydah.

== Pakistani cooperation ==
In 2006, Khalid Khawaja, a spokesman for the Pakistani human rights group Defense of Human Rights, cited the examples of Majid Khan and Saifullah Paracha as proof that the Pakistani government had lied about whether it had handed over Pakistani citizens to the U.S. The Associated Press quotes Khawaja as stating that: "Pakistan has sold its own people to the United States for dollars."

Khaled el-Masri, a citizen of Germany held for five months in the CIA black site in Afghanistan known as the "Salt Pit" in 2003 and 2004, a victim of mistaken identity, reported that Majid Khan was one of his fellow captives there.

== Related case ==
In September 2006, Uzair Paracha, the son of Saifullah Paracha, another Guantanamo detainee, was tried and convicted of terrorism charges in a U.S. court. Paracha had requested Majid Khan as a witness. The U.S. government declined to produce him, although he was in U.S. custody.

== Enhanced interrogation techniques ==
According to Khan, during his time imprisoned by the CIA, "the more I cooperated, the more I was tortured", and so he made up lies in order to appease interrogators. In the CIA black site, which he described as resembling a dungeon, "he was kept naked with a hood on his head, his arms chained in ways that made sleep impossible".

On March 13, 2008, the CIA released highly redacted documents from a Combatant Status Review Tribunal in which Khan describes abuse and torture he suffered in CIA custody.

The Senate Intelligence Committee's C.I.A. Torture Report, released December 9, 2014, revealed that Khan was one of the detainees subjected to "rectal feeding", which his lawyers described as a form of rape, as part of his ″torture regime″ at the black site prison. Khan's "lunch tray", consisting of hummus, pasta with sauce, nuts, and raisins was pureed and rectally infused," says the report.

== Release and life in Belize ==
=== Sentence completion and release ===
On June 7, 2022, lawyers for Khan petitioned the United States District Court for the District of Columbia for a writ of habeas corpus. The petition asked the United States inter alia to release him from his unlawful detention in Guantanamo and for the United States to comply with their non-refoulement obligations under international law for relocation to anywhere but his native Pakistan.

On 25 July 2022 the New York Times published that "a senior Pentagon official declared" Khan's sentence was completed on March 1, 2022, Khan was transferred to Belize on February 2, 2023.

=== Belize ===
Belize’s foreign minister called its agreement to settle Khan along with his wife and their teenage daughter “a humanitarian act”. Belize had required that the US government provide funds to buy Khan "a home, a phone, a laptop and a car".

In Belize, Khan issued a statement saying:

I have been given a second chance in life and I intend to make the most of it. I deeply regret the things that I did many years ago, and I have taken responsibility and tried to make up for them. The world has changed a lot in twenty years, and I have changed a lot as well."
