= Kidnappings of Antonie Chrástecká and Hana Humpálová =

Crime case

The kidnappings of Czech tourists in Balochistan occurred on 14 March 2013 when two Czech female tourists, Antonie Chrástecká (25) and Hana Humpálová (24), were abducted along with a Pakistani police officer near Nok Kundi while traveling by bus through southern Balochistan, Pakistan en route to India. The officer was later released in Afghanistan.

The kidnappers demanded (through video) the release of Aafia Siddiqui, a national of Pakistan imprisoned in the United States. A second video, released on 30 October, shows Antonie Chrástecká and Hana Humpálová reading statements about their burial wishes.

A rescue mission was planned by a Czech intelligence agency and the United States Army. However, the operation was delayed because of a sand storm; meanwhile, the kidnapped were moved to another location.

In March 2015, both tourists were released and safely returned to the Czech Republic via Turkey, following negotiations by the Turkish IHH Humanitarian Relief Foundation.

== See also ==
- Foreign hostages in Pakistan
- Overland route Europe - India (Hippie trail)
