= Laura Mansfield =

American author on Islamic terrorism

Laura Mansfield is the pseudonym for an American author specializing in counter-terrorism, the Middle East, Islam, and Islamic terrorism. She is the former Associate Director of the Northeast Intelligence Network. Mansfield writes for various online publications including WorldNetDaily and FrontPageMag.

== Background ==
Mansfield is fluent in written and spoken Arabic, and has spent nearly seven years living in the Middle East, working for a wide range of clients including a U.S. Embassy, the United States Agency for International Development, and international corporations. She was active in the embassy warden system, acting as a liaison between the embassy security office and her employer during the 1985 Beirut hijacking.

Mansfield heads the Strategic Translations and Analysis service which specializes in monitoring and translating Arabic language bulletin boards, news media and communiques from alleged radical Islamists.

== Media and Public Forums ==
Mansfield frequently appears on a wide array of mainly-US networks such as CNN and CNN International, Fox News, Fox News UK, Israel National Radio, BBC, and CBN as well as numerous radio stations across the US such as KGO Radio News in San Francisco, America at Night, WDEL, WFED, WTOP, the Laurie Roth Show, the Tom Bauerle Show, and the Carl Wigglesworth Show, as well as working for many unnamed Fortune 500 companies.

She was featured in the headlines in May 2004, as the investigator alleged to have originally downloaded the videotape of Nick Berg's murder from the Al-Ansar website.

Mansfield was the subject of a prominent feature on Arabiya TV in 2005 and was involved in communications with the web-based radical Irhabi 007.

In 2006, Mansfield spoke on the dangers of teaching about Islam in public schools.

In 2007, Mansfield was featured on Yahoo! front page.

CNN has featured purported Osama Bin Laden videos from Laura Mansfield.

== Attitudes on Islam ==
Mansfield believes that "the War on Terror began nearly a quarter of a century earlier (than Sept 11th 2001), with the Islamic Revolution in Iran" and that "[r]adical Islam had declared War on America" and has stated her belief that Islamists were behind the Oklahoma City bombing based on what she said was a "daily planner" from "Boot Camp - Class of 2000", although the judge in Timothy McVeigh's trial ruled a defence on these grounds inadmissible as speculation.

== Bibliography ==
- His Own Words: Translation and Analysis of the Writings of Dr. Ayman Al Zawahiri July 25, 2006 ISBN 1-84728-880-4
- Inshallah: My Journey Into the World of Islam, and My Escape, Greene Leaf Publishing; 2006 ISBN 1-59971-293-8.
- One Nation Under Allah. The Islamic Invasion of America, Greene Leaf Publishing; November 2005 ASIN B000F0BDG0.
