= Ahmad Farooq =

Pakistani Islamist Militant (died 2015)

Ahmad Farooq (language/Urdu: استاد احمد فاروق; c. 1979–1981 − 15 January 2015), sometimes referred to with the honorific title ustad, born Raja Muhammad Salman (راجہ محمد سلمان) was a Pakistani Islamist jihadi who served as the deputy Emir of Al-Qaeda in the Indian subcontinent, as well as Al-Qaeda's chief media person in Pakistan. It is believed he played a vital role in establishing Al-Qaeda in Pakistan after the September 11 attacks.

== Early life ==
Ahmad was born in Brooklyn between 1979 and 1981 to a Pakistani family. He was from Islamabad and received Sharia education at the International Islamic University, Islamabad. He joined Al-Qaeda and quickly rose to become its chief propagandist in Pakistan, releasing several videos, audio clips and writings perpetuating his views.

== Death ==
On 15 January 2015, Usama Mahmood, the spokesman for Al-Qaeda in the Indian Subcontinent confirmed that Ahmad Farooq had been killed in drone attacks conducted by the U.S. in the Lowara Mandi area of North Waziristan. President Barack Obama announced that, in the same drone strike, hostage aid workers Giovanni Lo Porto and Warren Weinstein were killed as collateral damage.
