= Kidnapping of Swiss tourists in Balochistan =

Kidnapping of a Swiss couple by the Pakistani Taliban

On 1 July 2011, a Swiss couple was kidnapped in the Balochistan province of southwestern Pakistan. According to Pakistani officials, they were travelling by car when unidentified gunmen seized them in the Loralai District, approximately 150 km north of Quetta. The kidnapping was the first such incident involving Swiss nationals in Pakistan, according to the Swiss foreign ministry.

Pakistani officials informed Swiss diplomats of the abduction, and a search operation was launched with assistance requested from tribal leaders in the region. In response, Swiss authorities established a task force to coordinate efforts and contacted both Pakistani officials and the victims' families.

On 5 July 2011, a spokesman for the Pakistani Taliban claimed responsibility for the abduction and said the Swiss couple had been moved to South Waziristan near the Afghan border. The group indicated it would soon issue demands, including a possible ransom or prisoner exchange.

In March 2012, the couple surfaced at a military checkpoint in North Waziristan after more than eight months in captivity. Pakistani officials said they had escaped, a claim echoed by the Swiss foreign minister, who also stated that no ransom was paid. However, conflicting reports at the time suggested their release may have involved a ransom or a prisoner exchange. According to the Pakistani military, they received medical treatment and appeared in good health before being flown to Peshawar and then Islamabad, where they were handed over to Swiss authorities.

== See also ==
- Foreign hostages in Pakistan
- List of kidnappings
- Lists of solved missing person cases
