= Saifullah Paracha =

Pakistani Guantanamo detainee (born 1947)

Saifullah Abdullah Paracha
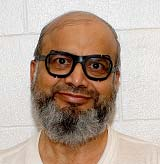
- Born: August 17, 1947 (age 79); Mangwal, Dominion of Pakistan
- Released: October 29, 2022
- Detained at: CIA black sites; Bagram; Guantanamo
- ISN: 1094
- Status: Released

Saifullah Abdullah Paracha (born August 17, 1947) is a citizen of Pakistan who was held without charge in the United States Guantanamo Bay detainment camps, in Cuba for over 18 years. He was released on October 29, 2022. As of May 18, 2021, Saifullah Paracha was approved for release by American authorities after his son Uzair Paracha's conviction was overturned in 2018 and the younger Paracha was repatriated to Pakistan in March 2020.

On October 29, 2022, Pakistan's Foreign Office Spokesperson Asim Iftikhar stated that Saifullah Paracha has been released from Guantanamo prison and has returned to Pakistan.

== Early life ==
The Department of Defense reports that Paracha was born on August 17, 1947, in Mangowal Kalan, village in tehsil Shahpur of District Sargodha in Punjab Pakistan. He graduated from a university in Karachi with a degree in physics and attended New York Institute of Technology, studying computer systems analysis.

At the time of his capture, Paracha legally resided in the United States, in Queens, New York City. He managed various businesses such as travel agencies, real estate, and a media company. He obtained his green card in 1980.

== Arrest ==
Officials pretending to be Kmart representatives told him they needed to meet him in Bangkok, Thailand, to discuss a deal. He was captured by FBI agents in July 2003. He was accused of meeting Osama Bin Laden and helping 'facilitate financial transactions and propaganda' for the 9/11 orchestrators. He also allegedly met with bin Laden during a delegation of Pakistani dignitaries.

He was then taken to Bagram Airbase in Afghanistan where he was initially held.

A little over a year into his imprisonment, he suffered a heart attack and was moved to Guantanamo Bay. He underwent heart surgery in 2006 at the hospital in Guantanamo Bay.

== Combatant Status Review ==
A Summary of Evidence memo was prepared for Saifullah Paracha's Combatant Status Review Tribunal, on October 6, 2004.

== Saifullah Paracha v. George W. Bush ==
A writ of habeas corpus, Saifullah Paracha v. George W. Bush, was submitted on Saifullah Paracha's behalf. In response, on December 21, 2004, the Department of Defense published fifty-eight pages of unclassified documents related to his Combatant Status Review Tribunal.

On December 8, 2004, Tribunal panel 24 convened and confirmed Saifullah Paracha's "enemy combatant" status.

== Press reports ==
On July 12, 2006, the magazine Mother Jones provided excerpts from the transcripts of a selection of the Guantanamo detainees. Paracha was one of the detainees profiled. According to the article his transcript contained the following exchange:

Tribunal president: I do know you had some questions about the legality of your detention. That would be referred to other organizations of the government, but you will be receiving more specific instructions shortly of how to bring your question to U.S. courts.

Paracha: Your honor, I have been here 17 months; would that be before I expire?

Tribunal president: I would certainly hope so, especially since you are under the care of the U.S. government while you are here. As far as some of the other statements you made about jurisdiction, this is a U.S. government executive decision in regards to the detention of enemy combatants….

Paracha: Your honor, my question is that your executive order is applicable around the earth?

Tribunal president: It is a global war on terrorism.

Paracha: I know, sir, but you are not the master of the earth, sir….

Tribunal president: Would you be surprised to hear that Osama bin Laden founded Al Qaeda and Al Qaeda includes people from all over the world? People from America, Afghanistan, Pakistan, Philippines, and people from wherever?

Paracha: Sir, how could anybody know who Al Qaeda is?

Tribunal president: Good question. That's a very good question.

On June 2, 2008 Zachary Katznelson appealed to the Pakistani government for assistance, stating:

Political intervention is the only hope for Saifullah Paracha to receive justice.

== Joint Review Task Force ==
On January 21, 2009, the day he was inaugurated, United States President Barack Obama issued three Executive orders related to the detention of individuals in Guantanamo Bay. That new review system was composed of officials from six departments, where the OARDEC reviews were conducted entirely by the Department of Defense. When it reported back, a year later, the Joint Review Task Force classified some individuals as too dangerous to be transferred from Guantanamo, even though there was no evidence to justify laying charges against them. On April 9, 2013, that document was made public after a Freedom of Information Act request.

Saifullah Paracha was one of the 71 individuals deemed too innocent to charge, but too dangerous to release. Obama said those deemed too innocent to charge, but too dangerous to release would start to receive reviews from a Periodic Review Board.

== Periodic Review Board ==
The first review wasn't convened until November 20, 2013. Paracha was approved for transfer on May 13, 2021.

== Paracha's son ==
Paracha's son, Uzair Paracha, was convicted in 2005 for providing support to Al-Qaeda, that included assistance for Majid Khan to obtain documents.

On July 3, 2018, 15 years after his arrest, Uzair's conviction was deemed void by Judge Sidney H. Stein based on newly discovered statements made by Ammar Al Baluchi, Majid Khan and Khalid Sheikh Mohammad. Stein, who oversaw Paracha's trial and imposed his sentence, called it a "manifest injustice" to let the conviction stand and granted Paracha's request, made in November 2008, for a new trial.

Uzair was freed on 13 March 2020 and willingly repatriated to Pakistan, giving up his resident status.
