= Uzair Paracha =

Pakistani Al-Qaeda informant and criminal

- عزیر پراچہ
- Born: January 7, 1980 (age 46); Karachi, Pakistan
- Citizenship: Pakistan, U.S.
- Education: Institute of Business Administration
- Notable work: Secular Stagnation
- Status: Conviction voided July 3, 2018
- Criminal charges: providing material support to al-Qaeda
- Penalty: 30 years in prison, voided after 16 years

Uzair Paracha (born January 7, 1980) is a Pakistani citizen previously convicted of providing material support to al-Qaeda by a court in New York City in 2005. He received a 30-year prison sentence which was voided 18 years later, with his judge stating that letting his conviction stand was a "manifest injustice". In March 2020 the American government gave up on taking Uzair to trial again and he was released and repatriated after being imprisoned for 17 years.

== Early life ==
He is the son of Saifullah Paracha, a Pakistan citizen who was held by the United States in Guantanamo Bay detention camp in Cuba. Uzair was born in Pakistan on January 7, 1980. His mother Farhat Paracha was a student of sociology at New York University. Uzair Paracha himself attended Rainbow Montessori school in Brooklyn sometime before age 5. As a teen he attended B. V. S. Parsi High School in Karachi, Pakistan. Paracha subsequently obtained a degree in business administration from Institute of Business Administration (IBA), Karachi in 2003.

== Arrest and conviction ==
At the time of arrest in March 2003, he was a Permanent resident of the United States. He was initially held as a material witness in the investigation against al-Qaeda after the September 11 attacks. He was later charged with helping alleged al-Qaeda operative Majid Khan (Guantanamo Bay detainee 10020) obtain legal status in U.S. fraudulently, Uzair claims he did not know that Khan was an alleged al Qaeda operative. During his trial he refused a court settlement of 5 to 8 years in prison. In November 2005, he was convicted of helping Khan. In July 2006, he was sentenced to 30 years in federal prison. He was serving his sentence at FCI Terre Haute until his conviction was deemed void.

== Voided conviction ==
Over 15 years after his arrest, Uzair's conviction was deemed void on July 3, 2018 by Judge Sidney H. Stein based on newly discovered statements made by Ammar al-Baluchi, Majid Khan, and Khalid Sheikh Mohammed, bringing his involvement and intentions into question. Stein, who oversaw Paracha’s trial and imposed his sentence, called it a “manifest injustice” to let the conviction stand and granted Paracha’s request, made in November 2008, for a new trial.

He was freed on March 13, 2020 and willingly repatriated to Pakistan, giving up his resident status.

== Memoir ==
Uzair Paracha is the author of the memoir The Man Who Refused to Plead Guilty (2026), published by Pluto Press.

== See also ==
- Farooque Ahmed
- David Headley
- Faisal Shahzad
