= North Waziristan Agency =

North Waziristan Agency was an agency of the Federally Administered Tribal Areas (FATA) until 2018 when the region was merged into Khyber Pakhtunkhwa, as North Waziristan District in Bannu Division. Set up in 1895 by the British it had been FATA's second largest agency until its abolition.

== Geography ==
North Waziristan lay between 32°45′ and 33°15′N. and 69°30′ and 70º40'E with an area of about 4,707 square kilometres (1,817 sq mi), although previous estimates had been as high as 6,000 square kilometres (2,317 sq mi).

Northern
	33°15′N 70°05′E	
Western		Eastern
33°00′N 69°30′E		33°00′N 70°40′E
Southern
	32°45′N 70°05′E	

The agency was bounded on the west and northwest by Afghanistan, to the northeast by the Districts of Kohat, to the east by Bannu, on the south by South Waziristan Agency, now Upper South Waziristan District and Lower South Waziristan District. The boundary with South Waziristan Agency ran westward along the Shaktu stream, from the point where it enters Bannu upstream to Shuidar at its head. From Shuidar the boundary followed the eastern watershed of the Shawal valley as far as Drenashtar Sar, where it met Afghanistan. From there, the border with Afghanistan ran north-east along the Durand Line to Kohisar in the country of the Kabul Khel Wazīrs and Biland Khel.

In 1919 the western and northern borders, the Durand Line, were re-affirmed by the Afghan government with the signing of the Treaty of Rawalpindi, which ended the Third Anglo-Afghan War. However, following the Saur Revolution in 1978, Afghanistan again claimed all of Waziristan.

The Agency therefore encompassed four broad and fertile valleys. To the north lay the Lower Kurram Valley, situated between the upper reaches of the Kurram River and Bannu District. Adjacent to it was the Kaitu Valley, followed by Daurset in the Tochi Valley — which was the most open and agriculturally rich of the four. To the south stretched the Khaisora Valley.

Between the Kaitu and Tochi valleys lay two arid plains: the Sheratulla and, further north near Miranshah, the Dande — each covering roughly thirty square miles. Another plateau, known as the Spereragha, smaller but similar in character to the Sheratulla, was located between the Kurram and Kaitu valleys.

Apart from these exceptions, the valleys were divided by high, barren hills. The highest point in the region was Shuidar, rising to almost 11,000 feet at the western end of the Khaisora Valley. These hills were primarily composed of Eocene-era sandstone and conglomerate, interspersed with prominent limestone outcrops. Their surfaces were layered with loose, friable soil that, during floods, washed into the streams and enriched the valley floors with fertile silt.

The lowlands were prone to malaria and generally unhealthy from August through October. During the summer, people would migrate to the Shuidar highlands, where the climate was quite pleasant.

== Demography ==
In contrast to South Waziristan (where the Mehsuds were in the majority), the North Waziristan Agency was dominated by the Wazir tribe.

Apart from the Daurs inhabiting the Daur Valley, the population of Northern Waziristan largely consisted of members of the Darwesh Khel branch of the Wazir tribe. This branch was divided into two principal sections: the Utmanzai and the Ahmadzai, each comprising numerous sub-clans.

== History ==
British colonial authorities regarded the Darwesh Khel as among the most difficult of the Pashtun tribes to control. In 1894, their persistent raids against the Daurs prompted the Daurs to petition to the British Government for protection. As a result, the Daur region was placed under direct administrative control of the British, whereas the Wazirs remained subject only to political oversight.

Under the agreement made with Abdur Rahman Khan, the Amir of Afghanistan in 1893, the boundary of that State was demarcated by the Durand line survey in 1894-5 without apparent opposition from the Darwesh Khel, although it divided their lands between the two countries. In 1895 the North Waziristan Agency was created on paper, but raids into British territory continued, and in 1897 troops were sent from Datakhel to enforce the collection of a fine which had been imposed on the village of Maizar. The villagers then attacked this force, killing five British officers and men, and as a punishment their lands were laid waste by a military expedition. The tribe then submitted, nonetheless there were occasional raids and for some years the tract between Thal and the Tochi in the Lower Kurram valley inhabited by the Kabul Khel section of the Utmanzai remained a safe haven, in which a number of outlaws from British territory found refuge.

Finally, in November, 1902, columns entered it from the Tochi Valley, Bannu, and Thal. The tribesmen offered little opposition, but at Gumatti a gang of men made a desperate resistance. All towers were blown up and their rebuilding had not been permitted. Large numbers of rebels (about 250) surrendered themselves after the operations, and the country has since been opened by the tribe to the passage of troops and British officers. Roads have been made from Thal to Idak in the Tochi and to Bannu. Peace was then kept in the Tochi valley, the only portion of the Agency which had been administered, by a militia corps of 1,318 men, of whom 106 are mounted, the regular troops having been withdrawn in 1904.

In 1910 North Waziristan was created as a fully-fledged agency with its capital at Miranshah.

=== Anti-British rebellion and revolts ===
Waziristan, and particularly North Waziristan, remained unsettled during British rule, and a number of punitive expeditions were sent to quell the unrest.

=== Independent Pashtunistan ===
In 1948, the Faqir of Ipi took control of North Waziristan's Datta Khel area and declared the establishment of an independent Pashtunistan (Azad Pakhtunistan). In January 1950, a Pashtun loya jirga in Razmak appointed the Faqir of Ipi as the first president of the National Assembly for Pakhtunistan. In 1953–1954, the Royal Pakistani Air Force's No. 14 Squadron led an operation from Miran Shah airbase and heavily bombarded the Faqir's compound in Gurwek. Although he himself never surrendered until his death, his movement diminished after 1954 when his commander-in-chief surrendered to the Pakistani authorities.

=== End of the agency ===
After Pakistan became independent in 1947, North Waziristan Agency became part of the Federally Administered Tribal Areas. In 2018 it became the district of North Waziristan when FATA was merged into the province of Khyber Pakhtunkhwa.
