= Ipi, Waziristan =

Ipi ايپي آی پي
- Village
- Location within Khyber Pakhtunkhwa Location within Pakistan
- Coordinates: 32°57′15″N 70°17′58″E
- Country: Pakistan
- Province: Khyber Pakhtunkhwa
- District: North Waziristan
- Tehsil: Mir Ali
- Time zone: UTC+5 (PST)

Ipi is a village in the North Waziristan District of Bannu Division in Khyber Pakhtunkhwa province, Pakistan. The village attained prominence as the operational base of Mirza Ali Khan, a prominent insurgent leader who orchestrated sustained resistance against the British Empire from Ipi. Over time, Khan came to be widely recognised as the Faqir of Ipi — a term first used by the British, who often applied the term faqir to denote ascetic or religious figures throughout South Asia.

== History ==
In 1923 Mirza Ali Khan, who later became known as the Faqir of Ipi, settled in the village of Ipi. Khan had performed the Haj to Mecca that year before settling in the village where he began to gain a reputation as a holy man among the Daurs. The village of Ipi was near to a British military road that linked Bannu with Razmak and in 1936 Khan managed to rouse the Daurs into rebellion against the British.

== Location ==
The village is located at 32°57'15N 70°17'58E and is situated north of the Tochi River between Mir Ali and Thall in North Waziristan, it lies 3km east of the town of Mir Ali.

== Militancy ==
The village has seen occasionally seen violence and attacks by militants as well as action by the Pakistan army. In October 2007 during Battle of Mirali, two planes bombed the village of Ipi, the army claiming it was targeting militant hideouts. In February 2021, two women working with an NGO called Sabawon were killed by suspected Taliban militants, the previous month a young doctor who was en route from Mirali to Peshawar was shot dead by firing from the village.
