= Hurmaz =

Village in Pakistan

- Coordinates: 32°58′5″N 70°15′40″E

Hurmaz is a village in the Mir Ali Tehsil of North Waziristan District, Pakistan. It is situated in Mirali Town, crossing the Mirali Miranshah Road. There are about 5,200 households in the village counted during listings of internally displaced peoples. 150 households were counted during early times. There are four sub-tribes (Khels) living in the village. They are Karhi Khel, Hassan Khel (including Degan and being the majority one), Land, and Nekpi Khel. Mairee and Suleman Khel are the further sub-tribes of Karhi Khel. The village Hurmaz have 4,500 registered vote in 2018 election. There are three geographical settlement of the village Hurmaz; Palama (Near to main Mir Ali and Miranshah Road), Karhanaka (In between Village and Palama area), and Kala means village. The Kala further divided into Lower sub-village (Keez Kala), Uper suub-village (Pos Kala) and Dawn area. The Dawn area is mainly agricultural and graveyards of every Khels inhabitants in village Hurmaz.

The village has fertile land and is irrigated by distributaries and watercourses from Tochi valley. The irrigation system is old and most of the water channels are unlined. Furthermore, the village Hurmaz is famous for high literacy rate. Government High School Hurmaz is one of the historical institutions in village Hurmaz.
