= Tochi =

Tochi or Tōchi may refer to:

- Tochi Valley, a fertile area in North Waziristan, Pakistan
- Gambila River, also called Tochi River, in Bannu District, Khyber Pakhtunkhwa, Pakistan
- The Japanese name for Aesculus turbinata (Japanese horse-chestnut)
- Japanese destroyer Tochi, a Tachibana-class destroyer of the Imperial Japanese Navy during World War II, canceled in May 1945
- JDS Tochi (PF-16, PF-296), a Kusu-class patrol frigate of the Japan Maritime Self-Defense Force, formerly USS Albuquerque (PF-7)
- The Japanese name for douchi when referring to the type of fermented and salted black soybean

== Surname ==
- Brian Tochi (born 1963), American actor, screenwriter, film director and producer
- Hiroki Tōchi (born 1966), Japanese voice actor
- Iwuchukwu Amara Tochi (born 1985 or 1986), Nigerian national convicted of drug trafficking in Singapore

== Given name ==
- Princess Tōchi (born 648?), Japanese Imperial princess during the Asuka period
- Tochi Chukwuani, Danish footballer
- Tochi Onyebuchi (born 1987), Nigerian-American speculative fiction writer
- Tochi Raina (born 1965), Indian singer, best known as a playback singer in Hindi films
