= Arsala Khan =

Arsala Khan may refer to:

- Arsala Khan (Pakistani politician)
- Wazir Arsala Khan, 19th-century foreign minister of Afghanistan
- Chak-e-Arsala Khan, Kashmir, a town in the disputed region of Kashmir
