= Tochi Valley =

Fertile area located in Pakistan

- Dawar
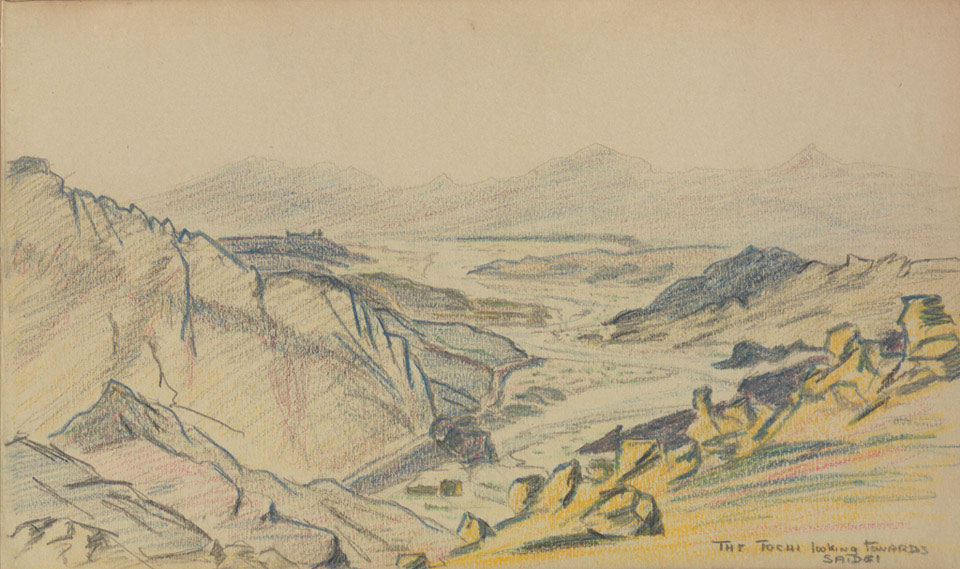
- Pastel and pencil sketch by Captain Cecil Wotton Toovey of The Tochi looking towards Saidgi', 1919 (c)

Naming
- Native name: درہ ٹوچی (Urdu)

Geography
- Location: North Waziristan
- Population centers: Datakhel, Eidak, Ipi, Mir Ali, Miranshah, Saidgi, Shirani
- Borders on: Khost Province, Afghanistan (north); Bannu District (east), South Waziristan District (south); Khost Province, Afghanistan (west)
- River: Gambila River

The Tochi Valley, also known as Dawar, is a fertile area located in the North Waziristan District in Khyber Pakhtunkhwa province of Pakistan. The Tochi Valley is also one of the few places where inscriptions of the Bactrian language have been found, archaeologist have also found old stone inscriptions in Arabic, Sanskrit and Kharosthi.

== History ==
The Tochi Valley, as well as being a fertile corridor in North Waziristan, served as a key invasion route for Mahmud of Ghazni during his campaigns into the Indian subcontinent in the 11th century. Traces of the ancient roadways and defensive structures that once flanked the valley still remain visible, bearing witness to its long-standing military importance.

Following the Waziristan Expedition of 1894, the British Raj garrisoned the valley, asserting control during a volatile period.

Key strategic posts in the valley included Saidgi, Miramshah, Datta Khel, and Shirani, which functioned as administrative and military outposts. The valley also witnessed significant military engagements:

The Tochi Expedition of 1872 (also known as the Dawari Expedition), led by Brigadier-General C.P. Keyes, and The Tochi Expedition of 1897, commanded by General Corrie Bird, highlighted the importance of maintaining control over the valley in frontier military policy.

An attack on the Political Officer's escort on 10th June 1897 by tribesmen led to a withdrawal of British forces but the withdrawal appeared to have been managed effectively resulting in Lieutenant-Colonel W. du G. Gray (Commanding Tochi Valley Troops) to write in praise of his men - which included native troops.

In 1901 Lord Curzon reorganised the frontier districts of Punjab into the new North-West Frontier Province as part of this reorganisation, the British troops in Tochi were withdrawn, and their place supplanted by tribal militia.

In 1910 the North Waziristan Agency was created by the British colonial government with its headquarters at Miranshah in the valley.

== Names ==
"Tochi" is thought to signify Tokharistan and the Tokharian tribes which inhabited this area. An alternative name for the Tochi Valley is Dawar from the Middle Iranic dātbar, meaning "Justice-giver".

== Geography ==
The Tochi Valley is in situated in North Waziristan District, located between the Bannu District of Pakistan and the Khost Province of Afghanistan, and is inhabited by the Dawari Pashtun tribe. The valley is divided into two parts, known as Upper and Lower Dawar, by a narrow pass called the Taghrai Tangi, some three miles long. Between Dawar and Bannu is the low range of uninhabited hills, which skirt the Bannu District.

The Gambila River (also called Tochi River) is the most important river in the valley.

== Notable people ==
- Mirzali Khan, known as the Faqir of Ipi, was a Pashtun tribal chief and freedom fighter.
- Mulla Powinda (revolutionary leader), started his guerrilla warfare against the British in Tochi Valley.

== See also ==
- North-West Frontier (military history)
