= Dossali Tehsil =

Dossali Tehsil تحصیل دوسالی دوسالي تحصیل
- Tehsil
- Country: Pakistan
- Region: Khyber Pakhtunkhwa
- District: North Waziristan

Population (2017)
  - Total: 39,821
- Time zone: UTC+5 (PST)

Dossali Tehsil is a subdivision located in North Waziristan District, Khyber Pakhtunkhwa, Pakistan. The population is 39,821 according to the 2017 census.

== Notable people ==
- Gilaman Wazir
- Mir Kalam Wazir

== See also ==
- List of tehsils of Khyber Pakhtunkhwa
