= Usman Ghazi =

Leader of an Uzbek militant group (died 2015)

Usman Ghazi (Uzbek: Usmon Gʻoziy) was the Emir of the Islamic Movement of Uzbekistan, a militant group based in Afghanistan and Pakistan. He succeeded Usman Adil after the latter's death in a drone strike.

== History ==
Just weeks before the Taliban admitted that it had hid its leader Mullah Omar's death for over two years, Ghazi had released a statement questioning the status of the Taliban leader and praising the Islamic State. Ghazi likely viewed the Taliban's admission as confirmation that he was right to be skeptical all along, and on August 6, 2015, the Islamic Movement of Uzbekistan released a video that featured the group's leader, Uthman Ghazi, and numerous IMU fighters swearing allegiance to Abu Bakr al-Baghdadi. Usman Ghazi and the IMU officially pledged allegiance to the Islamic State and its leader Abu Bakr al-Baghdadi and merged with its fledgling Khorasan province.

After his group attacked an airport in Karachi, the Pakistani Army launched Operation Zarb-e-Azb in North Waziristan to flush out the Islamic Movement of Uzbekistan and other Taliban and al-Qaeda-affiliated groups.

Many groups crossed into Afghanistan including the Islamic Movement of Uzbekistan with its leader Usman Ghazi. He found a sanctuary in Zabul province of Afghanistan beside Mullah Mansoor Dadullah. Mansoor was vocal against the Taliban leadership that had emerged after Mullah Omar's death.

After creating considerable differences with the Afghan Taliban, Mansour's and Usman Ghazi's joint base was raided by Taliban militants in late 2015 where all the affiliates of Mansour were reported to have been killed including IMU leader, Usman Ghazi.
