= Gorwekht =

Gurwek
- Town
- Country: Pakistan
- Province: Khyber Pakhtunkhwa
- Division: Bannu
- District: North Waziristan
- Time zone: UTC+5 (PKT)

Gorwekht, also known as Gurwek (Urdu: گورویک, Pashto: ګوروېک), is a town in the North Waziristan District of Bannu Division in the Khyber Pakhtunkwa province of Pakistan. Gurwek lies on the border with Afghanistan and is located about 46 km (29 mi) southwest of Miranshah, the capital of North Waziristan.

== History ==
Gorwekht is famous for being the site from where Mirzali Khan (Faqir of Ipi) led his guerrilla warfare campaign, against the British Empire, Khan hid in caves near the town in 1937 to evade the British. The fort at Datta Khel was the nearest post to Khan's headquarters in Gorwekht and faced many sieges.

Following the departure of the British in 1947 Khan would later rebel against the newly created government of Pakistan.

It was in this town that Mirzali Khan symbolically declared his independent state of Pashtunistan.

On May 11, 2010, at least 24 "suspected militants" were killed in Gurwek and Datakhel from two drone strikes in Pakistan, in which the US fired up to 18 missiles. In 2014, about 929,859 people were internally displaced from North Waziristan as a result of Operation Zarb-e-Azb, a military offensive conducted by the Pakistan Armed Forces along the Durand Line, which is the international border between Pakistan and Afghanistan.

== See also ==
- Mirzali Khan
- Mullah Powindah
- Sartor Faqir
- Umra Khan
