= Razmak Tehsil =

Razmak Tehsil تحصیل رزمک رزمک تحصیل
- Tehsil
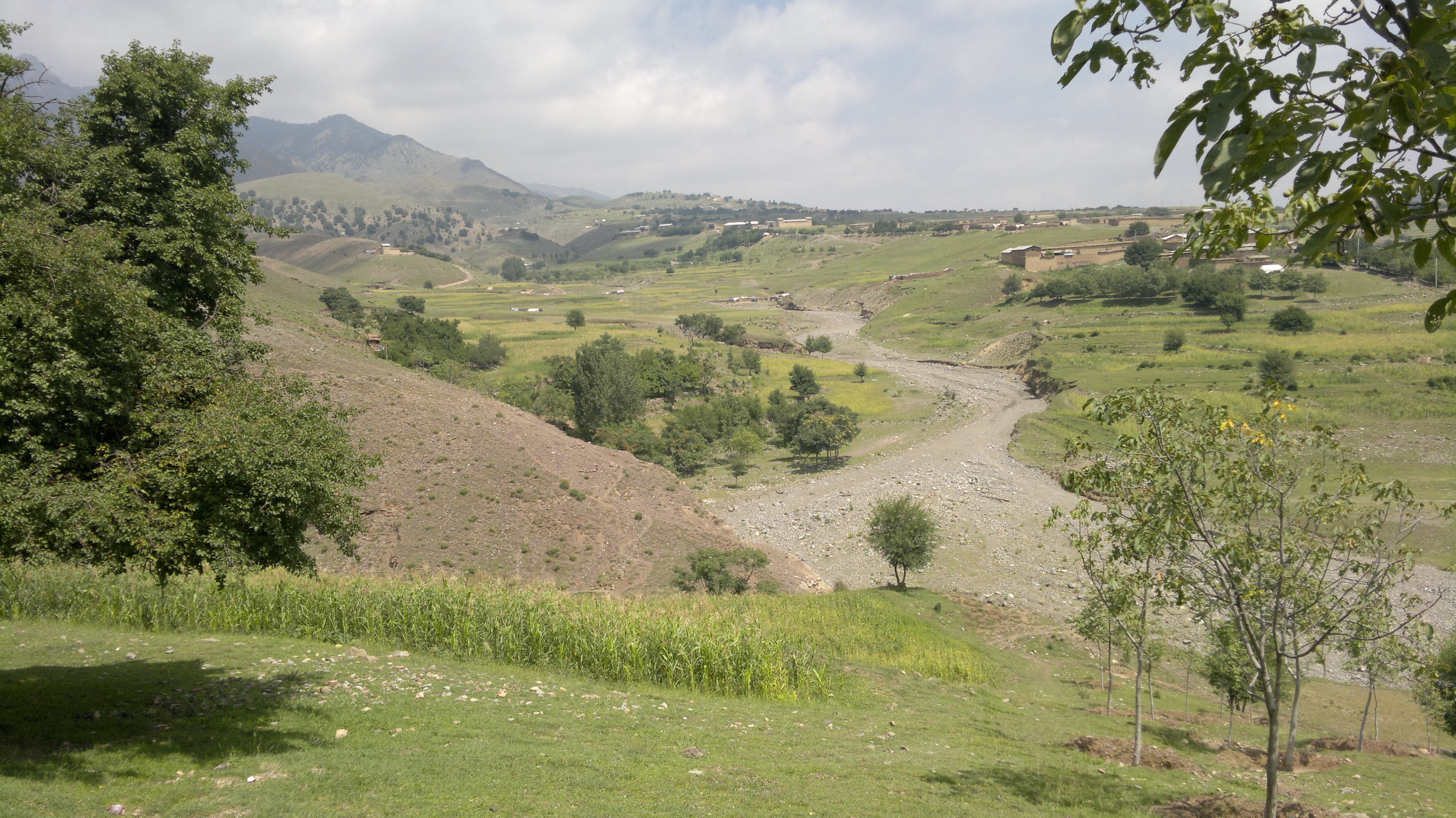
- Country: Pakistan
- Region: Khyber Pakhtunkhwa
- District: North Waziristan
- Seat: Razmak

Government
  - Chairman: Zia Ul Haq (JUI(F))

Population (2017)
  - Total: 17,629
- Time zone: UTC+5 (PST)

Razmak Tehsil is a subdivision located in North Waziristan District, Khyber Pakhtunkhwa, Pakistan. The population was 17,629 according to the 2017 census, the 2023 census recorded a population of 29,873 of whom 17,099 were male and 12,771 female.

== Notable people ==
- Gilaman Wazir
- Mir Kalam

== See also ==
- Razmak
- List of tehsils of Khyber Pakhtunkhwa
