= Kand Dam =

Dam in Khyber Pakhtunkhwa, Pakistan

- Location within Pakistan
- Country: Pakistan
- Location: North Waziristan Agency, FATA
- Coordinates: 33°05′30″N 70°12′25″E
- Status: Operational
- Construction began: 2011
- Opening date: December 2016
- Construction cost: PKR 198.145 million
- Owner: Government of Pakistan

Dam and spillways
- Type of dam: Embankment, rock-filled
- Height: 23 m (75 ft)
- Length: 200 m (640 ft)

Reservoir
- Total capacity: 4,163,000 m^{3} (3,375 acre⋅ft)
- Catchment area: 53.7 km^{2} (20.75 sq mi)

Kand Dam is small earth core rock-fill dam in North Waziristan Agency of FATA, Pakistan.

The construction of dam started in 2011 and was expected to be complete by September 2014 with projected cost of PKR 198.145 Million. Due to military operations, construction of the dam was suspended in June 2014 at 86% progress. It was eventually completed in December 2016.

The dam has a height of 23 metres (75 ft) and a length of 200 metres (640 ft). If completed, the dam would irrigate 290 hectares (716 acres) of land, with a total water storage capacity of 4,163,000 cubic metres (3,375 acre⋅ft), and a catchment area of 53.7 square kilometres (20.75 sq mi).

== See also ==
- List of dams and reservoirs in Pakistan
