= Ansar ul-Mujahideen =

Ansar Al-Mujahideen was a banned militant group by Pakistani government operating in Pakistan. The group was affiliated to Tehrik-i-Taliban Pakistan. The group mostly carried out attacks against Pakistan Armed Forces and politicians, but also threatened polio vaccination teams. Its members were largely Uzbeks and operated from North Waziristan.

== Major attacks ==
- 16 Oct 2013: Israr Ullah Khan Gandapur, Provincial Law Minister of KPK was killed in a suicide bomb attack while greeting people meeting him, Ansar ul-Mujahideen claimed responsibility.
- 13 Oct 2013: The group claimed responsibility for the suicide attack on a convoy in Wana that killed two security officials.
- 18 Dec 2013: An explosive-laden truck hit a major security post in North Waziristan, killing five soldiers and injuring more than 20. The group claimed responsibility.

== See also ==
- Adnan Rashid
- War in North-West Pakistan
