= Abu al-Layth al-Libi =

Libyan al-Qaeda militant (1967–2008)

- أبو الليث الليبي
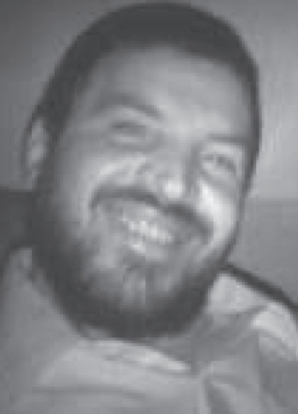
- Al-Libi in October 2006
- Born: Ali Ammar Ashur al-Raqiai; 1 January 1967; Libya
- Died: 29 January 2008 (aged 41); Mir Ali, North Waziristan, Pakistan
- Occupation: Senior leader of the al-Qaeda movement in Afghanistan
- Years active: 1980s–2008
- Known for: Appeared in several al-Qaeda videos

Abu al-Layth al-Libi (Arabic: أبو الليث الليبي, romanized: ʾAbū al-Layth al-Lībī; 1 January 1967 – 29 January 2008), born Ali Ammar Ashur al-Raqiai, was a Libyan militant who was a leader of al-Qaeda in Afghanistan who appeared in several al-Qaeda videos. He was believed to have been active in the tribal regions of Waziristan in Pakistan. He also served as an al Qaeda spokesman. According to the Defense Intelligence Agency, he was an "expert in guerilla warfare."

== Life ==
The Defense Intelligence Agency says he was born in 1967. In the 1980s he was one of the Afghan Arabs who came to Afghanistan to fight the Soviet Union during the Soviet–Afghan War. He returned to Libya in 1994 and took part in a failed attempt to oust Muammar Gaddafi. In the wake of this attempt al-Libi escaped to Saudi Arabia, where he was imprisoned in Riyadh following the Khobar Towers bombing. Sometime thereafter he was either released or managed to escape, and came to Afghanistan to collaborate with al-Qaeda and the Taliban. In 1997, a dispute between the two oldest brothers of the Canadian Khadr family, Abdullah and Abdurahman, was mediated by al-Libi, who earned their confidence and respect telling them about Dubai and Ferraris, and they later referred to him as a "really cool" person. In 2002, he approached the father Ahmed Khadr about letting the 15-year-old Omar serve as a translator for some Arab "visitors" in the region. When a gun-battle resulted in the young translator being sent to Guantanamo Bay detention camp, al-Libi tried to placate the family with gifts and apologies, but Khadr remained furious and refused to associate with al-Libi, whom he blamed for not taking care of his son.

In May 2005 when Abu Faraj al-Libbi was captured in Pakistan, his identity was confused in many reports with Abu al-Layth al-Libi.

Al-Libi was seen in two online videos in 2007, the first of which called for the kidnapping of Westerners. The second claimed preparations were being made for war against Israel and the subsequent imposition of Islam in the world. In February of that year he is said to have been involved in the Bagram Air Base bombing, which al-Qaeda claimed was an attempted assassination of U.S. Vice President Dick Cheney. In November 2007 he reported the merger of Libyan Islamic Fighting Group, a Libyan group waging jihad against Gaddafi, with al-Qaeda; this would be his last public appearance before his death.

== Death ==
On January 31, 2008, al-Libi was reported to have been killed by a targeted killing drone attack from an unmanned CIA Predator drone, either late Monday, January 28, or early Tuesday, January 29, 2008. CNN attributed reports of his death to a "knowledgeable western official", and an "unnamed military source".

MSNBC reported that some intelligence sources describe him as the number three leader of al Qaeda.

On January 31, 2008, it was reported by the SITE Intelligence Group that he had been killed after a message appeared on Ekhlaas.org, an Islamist website.

[Libi] was martyred with a group of his brothers in the land of Muslim Pakistan ... Though we are sad for his loss, he left a legacy that will inflame the enemy nation and religion.

— Ekhlaas.org,

Other members of al Qaeda's cadre of leaders have been reported to have been killed by the airstrike that killed al Libi.

The Italian news source Adnkronos reported three other al Qaeda leaders were killed. They were Abu Obeida Tawari al-Obeidi, Abu Adel al-Kuwaiti and Abdel Ghaffar al-Darnawi.

The Kuwaiti news source Arab Times also reported Abu Adel al-Kuwaiti was killed in the airstrike, but it asserted he was a Saudi, in spite of his name. It reported the death in the airstrike of a second Saudi, named Tawari Rakhis Al-Mutairi, who had also lived in Kuwait for a long period of time.

Michael McConnell, the USA's Director of National Intelligence, told members of the Senate Intelligence Committee

The death last week of Abu Layth al-Libi, al Qaeda's charismatic senior military commander and a key link between al Qaeda and its affiliates in North Africa, is the most serious blow to the group's top leadership since the December 2005 death of then-external operations chief Hamza Rabia.

Turkistanis were among ten Al-Qaeda allies who were killed alongside Abu Sahil al-Libi and Abu al-Layth al-Libi.
