= Jundallah (Pakistan) =

Salafi jihadist militant organization in Pakistan

Jundullah
- Black standard of Islamic State
- Dates active: 1996–2017
- Ideology: Salafist Jihadism; Central Asian Caliphate
- Size: 10,000–12,000 (in 2014); 400–1,000 (in 2015)
- Part of: Islamic State – Khorasan Province (2014–present); Tehrik-i-Taliban Pakistan (2007–2014)
- Wars: Insurgency in Khyber Pakhtunkhwa; War in Afghanistan (2001–2021); Insurgency in Balochistan; MQM militancy

Jundallah (Urdu: جندالله, lit. "Soldiers of God") was a militant group associated with Tehrik-i-Taliban Pakistan (TTP). The group was commanded by militant Hakimullah Mehsud, the Emir of TTP, until his death on 1 November 2013. Ahmed Marwat was the spokesman of the group. On 17 November 2014, a group spokesman told Reuters that it had vowed allegiance to the Islamic State, after a meeting with a three-man delegation from the group. In January 2017, the Government of Pakistan imposed a ban on Jundullah and other splinter groups that claimed responsibility for terror attacks.

== Claimed and alleged attacks ==
The group was wanted in connection to a wide range of militant attacks, most famously the 10 June 2004 assassination attempt on the convoy of Ahsan Saleem Hyat, the then Karachi Corps Commander.

=== February 2012 Kohistan massacre ===
In February 2012, 18 Shia Muslims travelling from Rawalpindi, Punjab to Gilgit, Gilgit Baltistan in Pakistan on a bus were stopped in Kohistan and massacred based on their religious affiliation by individuals dressed in Military uniforms. After the incident, Ahmad Marwat, claiming to be the commander of Jundallah, claimed responsibility for the act by contacting the media. After the shooting, the gunmen resorted to aerial firing and moved to the nearby hilly areas.

=== June 2013 murder of tourists in Gilgit–Baltistan ===
Jundallah claimed responsibility for the killing of tourists and their Pakistani guide in Gilgit–Baltistan. The tourists were mountain-climbers who had hoped to climb Nanga Parbat. The dead included five Ukrainians, three Chinese, and their guide.

=== September 2013 church bombing ===
On 22 September 2013, a twin suicide bomb attack took place at All Saints Church in Peshawar, Pakistan, in which 127 people were killed and over 250 injured. It was the deadliest attack on the Christian minority in the history of Pakistan.

=== Quetta 2014 attack ===
On 23 October 2014, a suicide bomber targeted Maulana Fazlur Rahman of Jamiat Ulema-e-Islam (F) (JUI-F), who was unhurt while three deaths occurred on spot and dozens were injured.

=== November 2014 suicide attack at Wagah ===
On 2 November 2014, a suicide bomber attempting to enter the parade arena after flag lowering ceremony detonated explosives, killing at least 60 people, including two Rangers, and injuring more than 110 others. Victims include 10 women and 7 children. Jundullah claimed responsibility for the attack, positing it as retaliation for Operation Zarb-e-Azb.

=== Shikarpur Shia Muslim massacre (30 January 2015) ===
Jundullah carried out a devastating suicide attack on Shia Muslims during Friday prayer. At least 49 were massacred at the mosque site. Lacking sufficient ambulances, military vehicles and privately-owned cars transported many victims to hospital.

Two men suspected of facilitating the 30 January Shikarpur Imambargah attack were arrested in a raid on Friday, police said. SSP Shikarpur Saqib Ismael Memon told the media that the suspects were arrested after being identified by the already arrested suspects during interrogation. "Shikarpur police in a raid in village Abdul Khaliq Kambrani near Sultankot has managed to arrest two persons who played the role of facilitator for the suicide bomber in Imambargah Karbala Maula attack," SSP Memon said. He said a drum full of explosive materials and detonators and other items used for preparing bombs was also recovered. At least 64 people were killed and many others wounded when a deadly suicide blast ripped through the Imambargah during Friday prayers late last month. The outlawed Jundullah militant group had claimed responsibility for the attack. Giving details about the suicide bomber, SSP Memon said that Mohammad Ilyas, a resident of Quetta, was brought to Shikarpur by Mohammad Raheem, who handed him over to the two accused presented before the media. The age of the suicide bomber was estimated to be between 18 and 20 years and before carrying out the attack on Imambargah, Ilyas stayed for a week with Ghulam Rasool and Khalil.

=== Karachi bus attack ===
The militant group Jundallah claims responsibility for the attack Wednesday 13 May 2015 on a bus in Pakistan that killed dozens of people, said Ahmad Marwat, a spokesman for the group. Gunmen on motorbikes dressed in military uniform attacked a bus carrying members of a religious minority (Ismaili-Muslim) in the southern Pakistani city of Karachi on Wednesday, killing 47 people and wounding at least 20 others.

== In literature ==
There was scant literature available on Jundallah in the English language. The Scriptwriter was the first English language novel written about Jundallah by a writer from the Pakistan/Iran region.

== See also ==
- Ansar Al-Mujahideen
