= Mir Ali Tehsil =

Mir Ali Tehsil تحصیل میر علی مير علي تحصیل
- Tehsil
- Country: Pakistan
- Region: Khyber Pakhtunkhwa
- District: North Waziristan
- Headquarters: Mirali

Population (2017)
  - Total: 185,525
- Time zone: UTC+5 (PST)

Mir Ali Tehsil is a subdivision located in North Waziristan District, Khyber Pakhtunkhwa, Pakistan. The population is 185,525 according to the 2017 census.

== Localities ==
- Hurmaz
- Mirali
- Mubarak Shahi
- Ziraki
- Issori
- Ipi
- Haider khel
- Hasu khel
- Uzimamaddi
- Mussaki
- Khadi
- Eidak
- Mulagan
- doulat khel
- machi khel

== Notable people ==
- Mirzali Khan
- Tahir Dawar
- Noor Islam Dawar

== See also ==
- List of tehsils of Khyber Pakhtunkhwa
