= Shirani (town) =

Pakistani town

Shirani شیرانی شيراني
- Town
- Location within Khyber Pakhtunkhwa Location within Pakistan
- Coordinates: 32°53′27″N 69°38′26″E
- Country: Pakistan
- Province: Khyber Pakhtunkhwa
- District: North Waziristan
- Tehsil: Datta Khel
- Time zone: UTC+5 (PST)

Shirani, (Pashto: شیراني), is a small town in the Tochi valley of North Waziristan District, in the Khyber Pakhtunkhwa province of Pakistan. It lies approximately 205 kilometres (127 mi) southwest of Peshawar, 92 kilometres (57 mi) west of Bannu, and less than 10 kilometres (6.2 mi) from the border with Afghanistan.

Historically, Shirani served as a strategic outpost during the British colonial era. The town is situated in a remote area of Datta Khel Tehsil and lies within a region known for the cultivation of Chilghoza pine nuts.
