= Saidgi =

Pakistani village

Saidgi, (Pashto: سیدګي), is a village in the Tochi valley of the North Waziristan District, Khyber Pakhtunkhwa, Pakistan.

Historically, the town served as a strategic outpost during the British colonial era. Due to its proximity top the border, the town has also experienced the effects of spillover conflict originating from Afghanistan.
