= Razmak =

Razmak رزمک رزمک
- Town
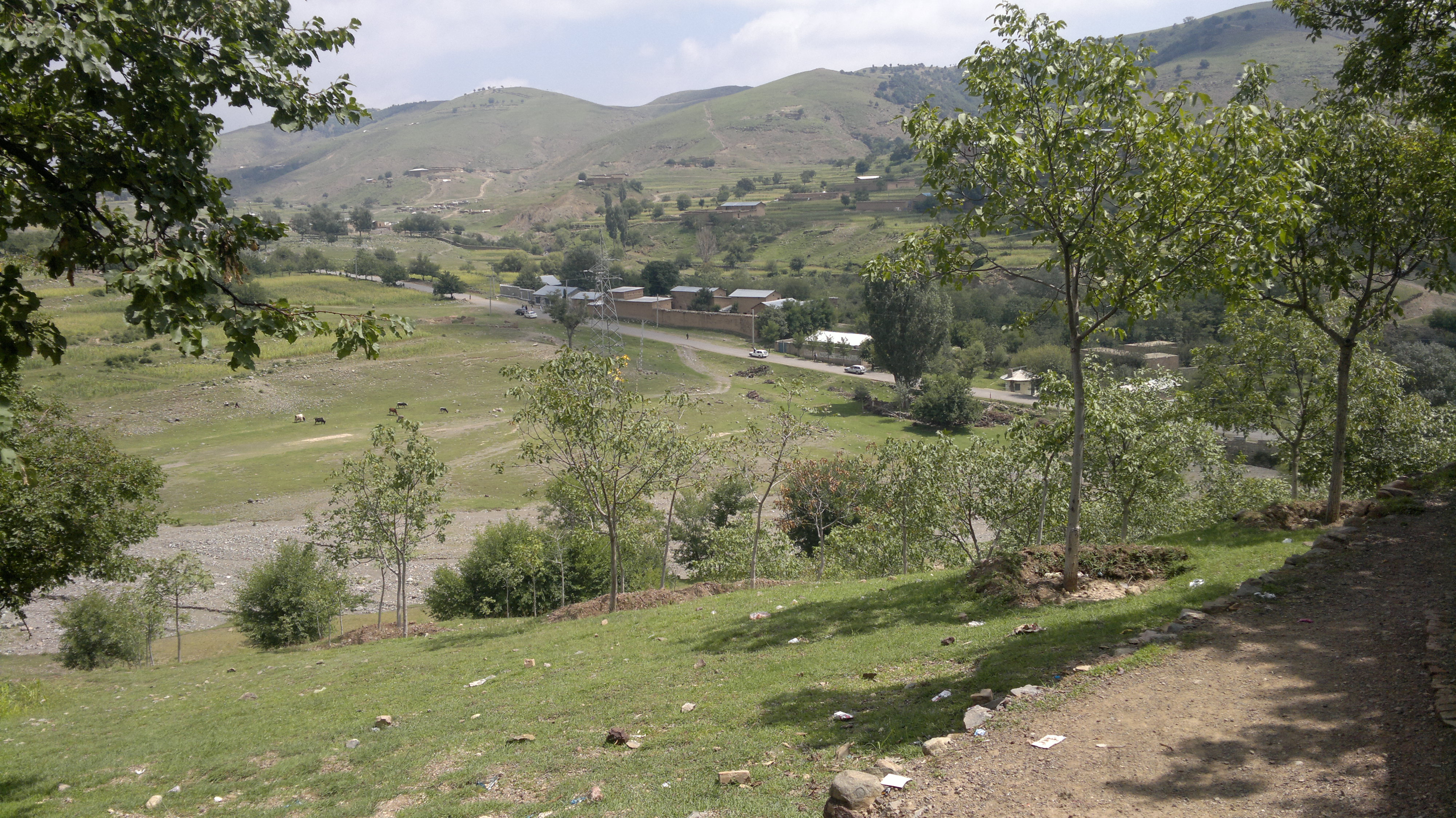

- Location within Khyber Pakhtunkhwa Location within Pakistan
- Coordinates: 32°41′23″N 69°49′48″E
- Country: Pakistan
- Province: Khyber Pakhtunkhwa
- District: North Waziristan
- Tehsil: Razmak
- Elevation: 2,010 m (6,590 ft)

Population (2017)
  - Total: 2,687
- Time zone: UTC+5 (PST)

Razmak (Pashto and Urdu: رزمک) is a town in North Waziristan District in the Khyber Pakhtunkhwa province of Pakistan. Razmak is the main settlement and capital of Razmak Tehsil which is an administrative subdivision of the district. Razmak is located at 32°41′23″N 69°49′48″E at an altitude of 2044 metres. and lies just north of Makeen, South Waziristan. The Ramzak valley is one of the major tourist destinations in the region. The inhabitants are almost exclusively Wazir Pashtuns, along with a few from the Mahsud tribe.

During the colonial era Razmak had been known as "Little London" by British forces stationed there. British troops had been stationed in Ramzak to tackle the famous Pashtun tribal leader Mirzali Khan, known as the Faqir of Ipi, who hid for a long time in areas around Razmak.

== History ==
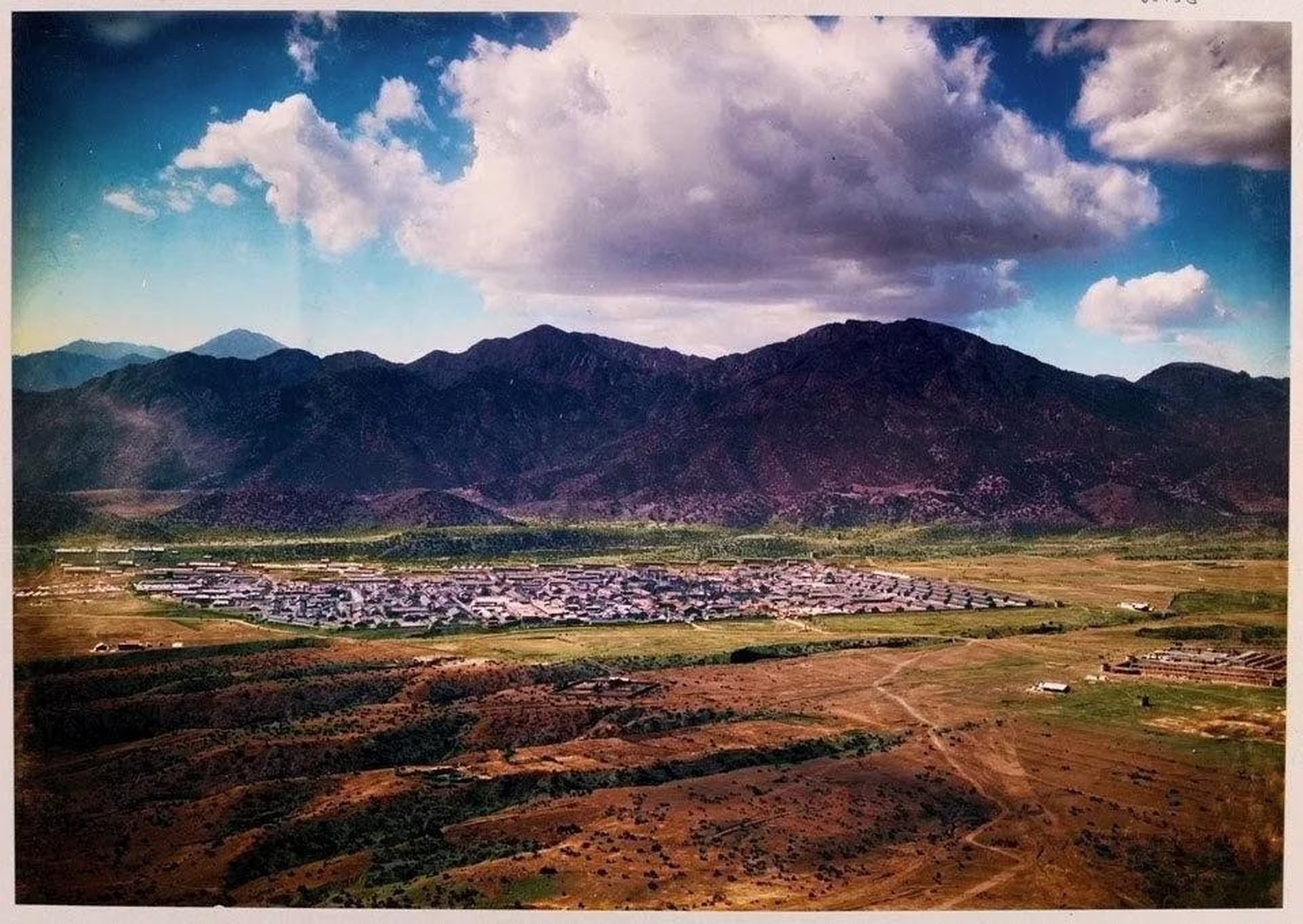
Colourised image of Razmak Camp, Waziristan, circa 1940

=== British Army ===
A British Indian Army camp was established at Razmak in January 1923, to accommodate the main British garrison of Waziristan at a strategic location on the North West Frontier and it became the base location for the Razmak Brigade. This followed the Waziristan campaigns of 1919–1920 and 1921–1924. The self-contained cantonment was capable of holding 10,000 men, and eventually contained gardens, sports pitches, a cinema, and a bazaar. New roads linking the garrisons and camps in the area were constructed to permit speedier troop movements around the area.

The camp would be an important location for the British in terms of pacifying the surrounding region, and in the Waziristan campaign of 1936–1939.

=== Mirzali Khan ===
Stories about Haji Mirzali Khan (Faqir of Ipi) are part of the folklore of the area. He was a tribal leader of Waziristan who rebelled against the British Raj, and started a guerilla warfare against the British. His movement was based in Gurwek, a remote village in Waziristan on the border with Afghanistan. It is said that the troops were after him and when they fired at him, their bullets melted midway and fell on ground. This is said to be the origin of the many grey hard pebbles lying on the hills of Razmak where Mirzali Khan was hiding.

After the creation of Pakistan in August 1947, Mirzali Khan and his followers refused to recognise Pakistan, and launched a campaign against Pakistan. He continued their guerilla warfare against the new nation's government. In 1950, he announced the creation of Pashtunistan as an independent nation. A Pashtun tribal jirga, held in Razmak, appointed Mirzali Khan as the President of the National Assembly for Pashtunistan.

However, later on Faqir Ipi, while addressing a gathering at Razmak, said that the Government of Afghanistan had misled him and deceived him in the name of Islam. He instructed his supporters that if the Government of Afghanistan made any future plan against Pakistan in his name, they should never support it.

== People ==
The religion of the people is Islam, the population is migratory and owns land also in other parts of the North Waziristan Agency where they migrate when it gets too cold. The main tribes that inhabit Razmak subdivision are Toori Khel, Boora Khel and Dirdooni. The dynamics of the society are governed by oligarchy. The elders of the tribes and families are the unelected leaders. The main elders of the area are Noor Baqi Jan, Zuman Alikhel, Nawaz Shakhimar in Toori khel, Shahzada and Saudal in boorakel, Hakeem Jan in Dirdooni.

=== Torikhel ===
The Torikhel clan lives in the mountains of Razmak. Used to climbing hills on foot, they are tough and hardy fighters. The Torikhel are further divided into Khushali, Alikhel, and Shogi subtribes. The Khushali is the bigger tribe among the Torikhel subtribes. The Khushali are further divided into nine subtribes. As per Nikat, the traditional tribal distribution, every thing in Razmak Tehsil is distributed equally among these tribes. Cadet College Razmak is also located here.

=== Boorakhel ===
Boorakhel are involved in trade and business, many of them drive trucks and buses down in the rest of Pakistan. They have apple orchards on the hills of Razmak. Their hospitality is very well known in Wazir Tribe.

=== Mahsud ===
The Mahsud live in the southern part of Razmak near Shuidar Ghar, as well as in the adjoining South Waziristan.

== See also ==
- Gilaman Wazir
- Mirzali Khan
- Mir Kalam Wazir
