= North Waziristan drone strike of late January 2008 =

American drone strike in Pakistan

In late January 2008 the CIA launched missiles from unmanned aerial vehicles at a house in North Waziristan where they believed a militant summit was taking place.

The Bureau of Investigative Journalism reported that this was the first drone strike for which the CIA did not seek approval from Pakistan before the strike. Targeted killing, another site that focused on tracking the outcomes of drone strikes, reported that there was a lot of confusion as to who was killed, who owned the house that was destroyed, and the exact date of the strike.

Initially security officials, claimed the most senior target had been Abu Yahya al Libi, until al Qaeda announced it had been Abu Laith al Libi. On February 5, 2008, Adnkronos named other militants were killed: Kuwaitis, Abu Obeida Tawari al-Obeidi, Abu Adel al-Kuwaiti and another man Abdel Ghaffar al-Darnawi. The Daily Times reported that the dead included five men who spoke the language of Mohammed" (i.e. Arabic).

The Washington Post reported that the guesthouse that was targeted belonged to Abdul Sattar, a taxi driver. They quoted neighbors who pointed out that knowing members of the Taliban was not a crime, in Pakistan. Other sources described Sattar as an elder, who was also a member of a gang that engaged in kidnappings for ransom and car thefts.

The World Almanac of Islamism: 2014 cited al-Obeidi as an example of a Kuwaiti who had assumed a significant role in al Qaeda's leadership.
