= Mubarak Shahi =

Village in Khyber Pakhtunkhwa, Pakistan

Coordinates: 32°57′N 70°10′E

Mubarak Shahi is a village of Mir Ali tehsil in Khyber Pakhtunkhwa, Pakistan.
