= Mir Kalam =

Pakistani politician

Mir Kalam Khan

Member of the Provincial Assembly of Khyber Pakhtunkhwa
- In office 27 August 2019 – 18 January 2023
- Constituency: PK-112 (North Waziristan-II)

Personal details
- Born: February 18, 1990 (age 36) Asadkhel (near Razmak), Dossali, North Waziristan, Pakistan
- Party: PkMAP (2023-present)
- Other political affiliations: IND (2019-2023)
- Parent: Shuja Mir Khan (father)
- Education: University of Peshawar

Mir Kalam Khan Wazir (Pashto/Urdu: میرکلام خان وزیر) is a Pakistani politician who had been a member of the Provincial Assembly of Khyber Pakhtunkhwa from August 2019 till January 2023. He is a founding member of the Pashtun Tahafuz Movement (PTM).

On 30 August 2020, Mir Kalam survived an assassination attempt by two gunmen as he was traveling in his car in Mirali, North Waziristan after participating in a protest. He lamented that the police had not made any progress in investigating the case.

== Early life and education ==
Mir Kalam was born and raised in Asadkhel, a village about 40 kilometres (25 mi) northeast of the hill station of Razmak, in the Dossali Subdivision of North Waziristan, Pakistan. In 2011, he graduated from the Department of Journalism and Mass Communication at the University of Peshawar.

== Political career ==
Kalam contested the 2019 Khyber Pakhtunkhwa provincial election on 20 July 2019 from constituency PK-112 (North Waziristan-II) as an independent. He won the election by the majority of 4,079 votes over the runner up Mir Sadiqullah of Jamiat Ulema-e-Islam (F). He garnered 12,057 votes while Sadiqullah received 7,978 votes.

He was elected unopposed to the Senior Vice President position of the Pashtunkhwa Milli Awami Party's (PKMAP) Khyber Pakhtunkhwa chapter during the party's national congress held between 19 and 21 December 2022. The Election Commission of Pakistan (ECP) notified his election on 9 January 2023.
