= Jandikhel =

Coordinates: 32°57′12″N 70°42′53″E

- Town and union council
- Interactive map of Jandikhel
- Country: Pakistan
- Province: Khyber Pakhtunkhwa
- District: Bannu District
- Time zone: UTC+5 (PST)

Jandikhel (Pashto: جنډي‌خېل) or Jando Khel is a town and union council of Bannu District in Khyber Pakhtunkhwa province of Pakistan. It is located 32°57'12N 70°42'53E and has an elevation of 307 metres (1010 feet).

== Islam Bibi case ==
In March 1936, a British Indian court ruled against the marriage of Islam Bibi, née Ram Kori, a Hindu-converted Muslim girl at Jandikhel. The ruling was based on the fact that the girl was a minor and was asked to make her decision of conversion and marriage after she reaches the age of majority, till then she was asked to live with a third party. The verdict enraged the Pashtuns, and because the starting point for a guerrilla war by the Faqir of Ipi (Mirzali Khan) against the British Empire.
