= Battle of Mirali =

2007 battle against the Taliban in Pakistan

- Part of the Insurgency in Khyber Pakhtunkhwa
Date	7–10 October 2007 (3 days)
Location	Mirali town, North Waziristan Agency, Federally Administered Tribal Areas, Pakistan 32.59°N 70.15°E
Result	Ceasefire

Belligerents
Pakistan	Afghan Taliban; Pakistani Taliban

Units involved
Pakistan Armed Forces; Pakistan Army; XI Corps; 9th Infantry Division; 5th Army Aviation Wing; Pakistan Air Force; No. 16 Squadron Panthers	Afghan Taliban; Pakistani militant groups

Strength
Unknown	Unknown

Casualties and losses
47 killed 20 wounded	175 killed 100 wounded
- Location within Pakistan

The Battle of Mirali was a military engagement that occurred between 7 October and 10 October 2007 and involved Pakistan Armed Forces against the Afghan Taliban and the Pakistani Taliban around the town of Mir Ali in Pakistan's North Waziristan District, the second biggest town in the semi-autonomous region on the border with Afghanistan.

== Timeline of the battle ==
According to the Pakistani Armed Forces, the clashes broke out on 7 October after militants set off improvised explosive devices and conducted ambushes on a Pakistani convoy, near the town of Mirali. The subsequent engagements killed nearly 200 people. The army says the casualties were militants and soldiers but local people reported at least ten civilians were among the dead. Hundreds of people fled Mirali after more than 50 houses were damaged in the fighting.

After a number of attacks on military convoys, near Mirali, the Pakistan Army sent helicopter gunships and Pakistan Air Force jet fighters to target suspected militant positions in several villages around that region.

On 9 October, according to the Pakistani Army, military aircraft struck "one or two places" near Mirali. There were confirmed reports that about 50 militants had been killed.

== Truce ==
On 15 October, Pakistani soldiers and tribal fighters in the northwestern province of North Waziristan agreed to a truce, and the Pakistani forces lifted the curfew over the area. This truce was over by the end of the month.

== See also ==
- List of drone strikes in Pakistan
