= Miran Shah Tehsil =

Miran Shah تحصیل میران شاہ میران شاه تحصیل
- Tehsil
- Country: Pakistan
- Region: Khyber Pakhtunkhwa
- District: North Waziristan
- Seat: Miranshah
  - leader_name = Nek Zaman Haqqani: (JUI(F))

Population (2017)
  - Tehsil: 100,680
  - Urban: 4,361
  - Rural: 96,319
- Time zone: UTC+5 (PST)

Miran Shah Tehsil is a subdivision located in North Waziristan District, Khyber Pakhtunkhwa, Pakistan. The population is 100,680 according to the 2017 census.

== Notable people ==
- Mohsin Dawar
- Hanif Pashteen

== See also ==
- Miran Shah
- List of tehsils of Khyber Pakhtunkhwa
