= Mir Ali, Pakistan =

Mirali میرعلي Mir Ali
- Tehsil
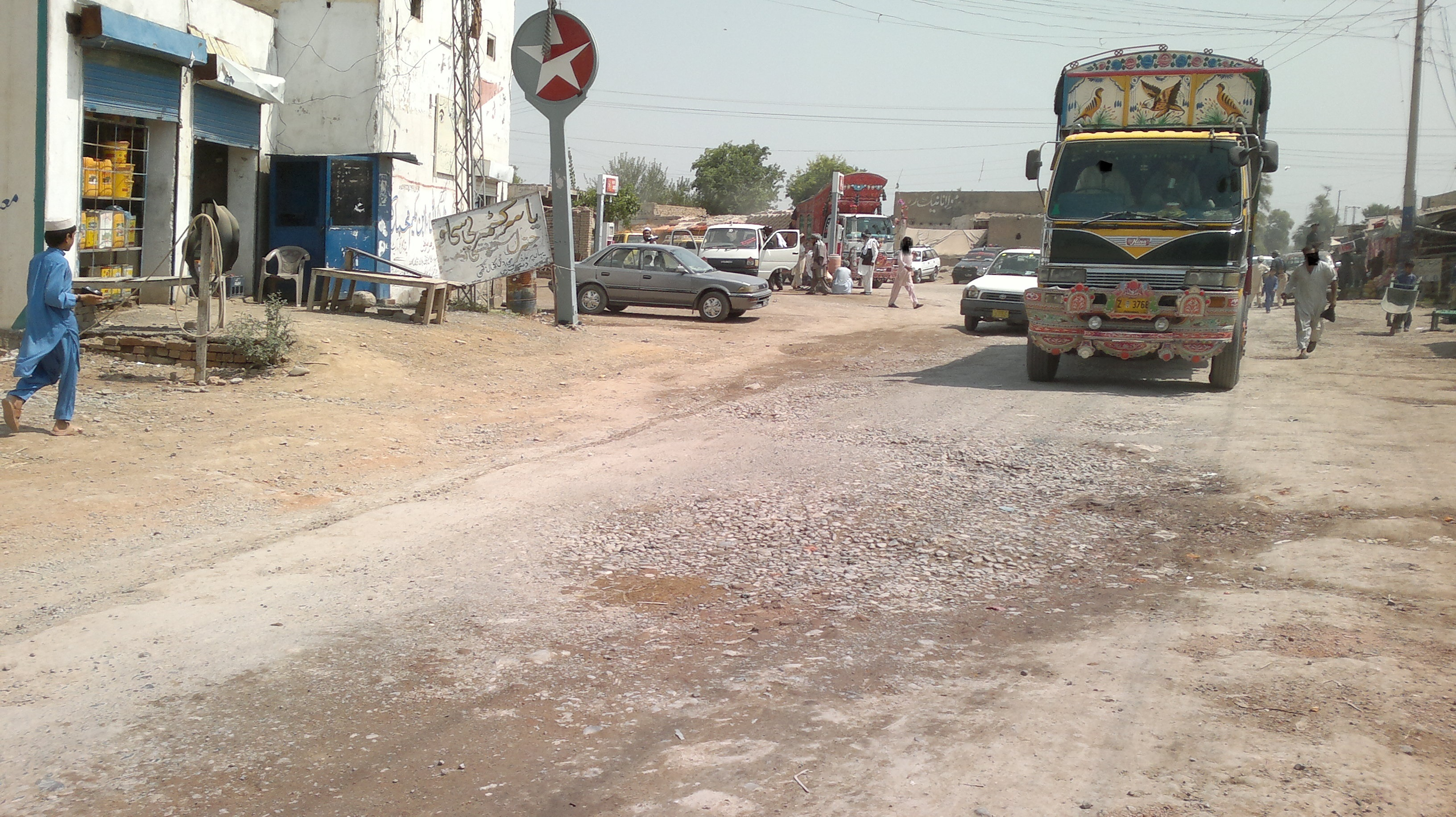

- Location within Khyber Pakhtunkhwa Location within Pakistan
- Coordinates: 32°58′12″N 70°16′12″E
- Country: Pakistan
- Province: Khyber Pakhtunkhwa
- District: North Waziristan
- Tehsil: Mir Ali
- Elevation: 674 m (2,211 ft)

Population (2017)
  - Total: 7,882
- Time zone: UTC+5 (PST)

Mir Ali or Mirali (Pashto: میرعلي) is a town in North Waziristan District, in Pakistan's Khyber Pakhtunkhwa province. Mirali is located in the Tochi Valley, about 12 kilometres (7.5 mi) east of Miramshah (capital of North Waziristan), 40 kilometres (25 mi) west of Bannu, Khyber Pakhtunkhwa, and 70 kilometres (43 mi) southeast of the city of Khost, Afghanistan. Mirali is at an altitude of 674 metres (2,211 ft).

The residents of Mirali are the Dawars and the Utmanzai Wazirs. The Wazirs reside in the areas of North Waziristan such as Spinwam, Shawa, and Khiasur, while the Dawars reside on both sides of the Tochi River. Some well-known villages of the Dawars in Mirali area are Hassu Khel, Haider Khel, Mussaki, Idaak, Khaddi, Hurmaz, Zeraki, Hakim Khel and Daulat Khel.

== History ==
The famous Pashtun freedom fighter and tribal leader Mirzali Khan (the Faqir of Ipi) based his movement in Ipi, a village on the outskirts of Mirali, for more than 10 years. In 1938, Mirzali Khan shifted from Ipi to Gurwek, Waziristan.

Abu Yahya al-Libi, the number two in Al-Qaeda at the time, was killed by a drone strike carried out by the United States on June 4, 2012 in Mirali.

On December 30, 2021, a gunfight during Pakistani troops' raid against a hideout of Tehrik-i-Taliban terrorists in the city killed four people.

On August 11, 2024, heavy exchange of fire between Pakistan Army and the militant insurgents of the outlawed Pakistani Taliban was reported.

== Notable people ==
- Mirzali Khan
- Tahir Dawar
- Noor Islam Dawar

== See also ==
- Battle of Mirali
- Abu Laith al-Libi
- Abu Obeida Tawari al-Obeidi
- Targeted killing
