= Adnan Rashid =

Militant commander

- Born: 1 October 1979 (age 47)
- Other name: Qari Sahib
- Organization: Tehreek-i-Taliban Pakistan
- Known for: Attack on former President General (retd) Pervez Musharraf; Mastermind of the 2013 Dera Ismail Khan jailbreak

Adnan Rashid (born 1 October 1979) is a Pakistani militant commander of Tehreek-i-Taliban Pakistan and former junior technician of the Pakistan Air Force. He is the chief of Ansar Al-Aseer, the TTP's unit tasked to free militant prisoners.

== Personal life ==
Rashid, an ethnic Pashtun, is a resident of the Chota Lahor area of Swabi district. He joined the Pakistan Air Force as a junior technician in 1997, but was later dismissed due to his extremist Salafi ideology.

== Militant activity ==
Rashid was convicted for an attack on then President General Pervaiz Musharraf in December 2003 and was given the death penalty. However, he was freed, along with 400 other inmates, by Taliban militants when they stormed the Bannu Prison in 2012.

He masterminded the Dera Ismail Khan jailbreak on 30 July 2013, in which 175 prisoners were freed including 35 high-profile militants.

Rashid wrote a letter to teenage education activist Malala Yousafzai, who was shot in the head by the Taliban, saying that he wished that the attack had not happened, but told her that she was targeted because she speaks against the Taliban.

On 11 July 2014, Adnan Rashid was reportedly captured along with three other militants by Pakistani security forces at his family residence near the town of Wana, South Waziristan. He was said to have fled to the area from North Waziristan after being injured during Operation Zarb-e-Azb. His arrest was confirmed by the TTP in a statement released on 16 July. However, later in July 2014, Reuters reported that Pakistani security officials and Pakistani Taliban commanders denied that Rashid was in custody. One military source described the initial reports of the arrest as a "mixup", while two associates of Rashid said the arrest report had been spread in an attempt to get him to react so that security forces could trace his whereabouts.

== See also ==
- Maulana Fazlullah
- Abdul Rashid Ghazi
- PAF Base Minhas
