= Shuidar =

Mountain peak in Pakistan

Coordinates: 32°45′55″N 69°46′50″E

Shuidaris a mountain peak located in the Waziristan region of Pakistan. It is the highest point in the North Waziristan District, rising to an elevation of approximately 3,400 metres (11,000 ft) at the western end of the Khaisora Valley.

The surrounding area is known for its mineral wealth, particularly deposits of manganese. Shuidar lies within a region traditionally inhabited by the Mahsud tribe, one of the major Pashtun tribal groups of Waziristan.
