= Muhammad Iqbal Khan (Khyber Pakhtunkhwa politician) =

Pakistani politician

Member of the Provincial Assembly of Khyber Pakhtunkhwa
- Incumbent
- Assumed office February 2024
- Constituency: PK-103 North Waziristan-I

Personal details
- Born: 1980-01-01; North Waziristan District, Khyber Pakhtunkhwa, Pakistan
- Political party: PTI-P

Muhammad Iqbal Khan is a Pakistani politician from North Waziristan District who has been a member of the Provincial Assembly of Khyber Pakhtunkhwa since February 2024.

== Career ==
He contested the 2024 general elections as a PTI-P candidate from PK-103 North Waziristan-I and secured 24,229 votes. The runner-up was Asad Ullah of JUI-F who secured 17,723 votes.
