= Faqir of Ipi =

Pashtun tribal leader (1897–1960)

Haji Mirza Ali Khan
- حاجي میرزا علي خان

President of the National Assembly of Pashtunistan
- In office January 1950 – April 1960

Personal details
- Born: c. 1897 Kirta Khajuri, Mirali, North Waziristan, British Raj
- Died: 16 April 1960 (aged 62–63) Kirta Khajuri, Mirali, North Waziristan, Pakistan
- Parent: Sheikh Arslan Khan

Military service
- Allegiance: Amanites; Pashtunistan movement
- Years of service: 1933-1960
- Battles/wars: Waziristan campaign (1936–1939); Afghan tribal revolts of 1944–1947; Waziristan rebellion (1948–1954)

Haji Mirza Ali Khan Wazir (Pashto: حاجي میرزا علي خان وزیر), commonly known as the Faqir of Ipi (Pashto: د ایپي فقیر), was a Pashtun tribal chief and adversary to the British Raj from North Waziristan in what is now Khyber Pakhtunkhwa, Pakistan.

After performing his Hajj pilgrimage in 1923, Mirza Khan settled in Ipi, a village located near Mir Ali in north Waziristan, from where he started a campaign of guerrilla warfare against the British Empire. In 1938, he shifted from Ipi to Gurwek, a remote village in north Waziristan on the border with Afghanistan, where he propagated idea of an independent state, Pashtunistan, and continued his raids against the British, using bases in Afghanistan. He had the support of Nazi Germany in his warfare against the British Raj.

On 21 June 1947, the Faqir of Ipi, along with his allies including the Khudai Khidmatgars and members of the Provincial Assembly, declared the Bannu Resolution which demanded that the Pashtuns should be given a third choice to have an independent state of Pashtunistan. The British government refused to comply with this demand.

After the independence of Pakistan in August 1947, Afghanistan and India financially sponsored the Pashtunistan movement under the leadership of the Faqir of Ipi. He started guerrilla warfare against the new nation's government, however he was ultimately unsuccessful and his resistance movement diminished in the early 1950s.

== Early life ==
Mirza Khan was born around 1897 at Shankai Kirta, a village near Khajuri in the Tochi Valley of North Waziristan, present day Pakistan, to Sheikh Arslan Khan Wazir.

He was a Pashtun from the Torikhel branch of the Utmanzai Wazir tribe. His father died when he was twelve. He studied until fourth grade at a government school and later pursued religious studies at Bannu.

He built a mosque and a house at Spalga, further south in North Waziristan agency in 1922. He went to perform Hajj at Mecca and later moved to Ipi in mid 1920s. He became a religious figure among the locals and was called "Haji Sahab" and was known for the introduction of both Sharia and Qanun law to Waziristan and for the introduction of the formal administration of justice and fairness in Ipi.

== Restoration of King Amanullah Khan ==
In 1933, the Faqir of Ipi went to Afghanistan to fight against the Mohammadzai Afghan King at Khost to support the restoration of King Amanullah Khan. In 1944, the Faqir of Ipi joined his fellow Loya Paktia tribesmen again to support the restoration of Amanullah Khan in the Afghan tribal revolts of 1944–1947. Until his death, the Faqir of Ipi remained involved in Afghan politics.

== Ram Kori case ==
In March 1936, a British Indian court ruled against the marriage of Islam Bibi, née Ram Kori, a Hindu girl who converted to Islam, at Jandikhel, Bannu, after the girl's family filed a case of abduction and forced conversion. The ruling was based on the fact that the girl was a minor and was asked to make her decision of conversion and marriage after she reaches the age of majority, until then she was asked to live with a third party. The verdict enraged the Pashtuns, and further mobilized the Faqir of Ipi for a guerrilla campaign against the British Empire.

The Dawar maliks and mullahs left the Tochi for the Khaisor Valley to the south to rouse the Torikhel Wazirs. A month after the incident, the Faqir of Ipi called a tribal jirga (Pashtun council) in the village of Ipi to declare war against the British Empire.

== Conflict with the British Raj ==
Faqir's decision to declare war against the British was endorsed by the local Pashtun tribes, who mustered two large lashkars 10,000 strong to battle the British. Many Pashtun women also took part in Ipi's guerilla campaigns, not only actively participated in the campaign but also singing landai (a short folk-song sung by Pashtun women) to inspire the Pashtun fighters.

Widespread lawlessness erupted as the Pashtuns blocked roads, overran outposts and ambushed convoys. In November 1936, the British Indian government sent two columns to the Khaisor river valley to rout Ipi's guerillas, but suffered heavy casualties and were forced to retreat.

Soon after the Khaisor campaign a general uprising broke out throughout Waziristan. A successful British campaign suppressed the uprising, leading to the realization of the futility of confronting the British directly especially with their advantage of air power. Ipi and his militants switched to guerrilla warfare. Squadrons of the two air forces (RAF and RIAF) launched numerous sorties against Ipi's forces, including dropping Jerrycan petrol bombs on crop fields and strafing herds of cattle.

In 1936 Ipi, who had received funding from the Soviet Union, threatened Razmak - over 30,000 troops were in action against him but he fled behind the Durand Line knowing that British forces would not pursue him across the border.

In 1937, the British sent over 40,000 British-Indian troops, mostly Sikhs from the Punjab, to defeat Ipi's guerillas. This was in response to an ambush by Pashtun Waziristani tribesmen in which they had killed over 50 British Indian soldiers. However, the operation failed and by December, the troops were sent back to their cantonments.

In 1939, the British Indian government claimed that the war capacity of the Faqir of Ipi's forces was enhanced by support from Nazi Germany and Italy, alleging that the Italian diplomat Pietro Quaroni drove the Italian policy for involvement in Waziristan, although the British were unable find any concrete evidence for Quaroni's involvement.

The British eventually suppressed the agitation by imposing fines and by demolishing the houses of their leaders, including that of the Faqir of Ipi. However, the pyrrhic nature of their victory and the subsequent withdrawal of the troops was credited by the Pashtuns (Wazir tribe) to be a manifestation of the Faqir of Ipi's miraculous powers.

He succeeded in inducing a semblance of tribal unity (something which was noted by the British Indian government) among various sections of Pashtuns including the Khattaks, Wazirs, Dawar, Mahsuds and Bettanis. He cemented his position as religious leader by declaring a Jihad against the British.

This move also helped rally support from Pashtun tribesmen across the border. In 1946, the British again attempted to decisively defeat Ipi's movement, but this effort was unsuccessful.

== Jirga in Bannu ==
On 21 June 1947, the Faqir of Ipi, Abdul Ghaffar Khan, and other Khudai Khidmatgars held a jirga in Bannu during which they declared the Bannu Resolution, demanding that the Pashtuns be given a choice to have an independent state of Pashtunistan composing all Pashtun majority territories of British India, instead of being made to join the new dominions of India or Pakistan.

However, the British government refused to comply with the demand of the Bannu Resolution and only the options for Pakistan and India were given.

== Pashtunistan movement ==
The Faqir rejected the creation of Pakistan after the partition of British India, considering Pakistan to have only come into existence at the insistence of the British. In 1948, the Faqir took control of North Waziristan's Datta Khel area and declared the establishment of an independent Pashtunistan, forming ties with regional leaders including Prince Mohammed Daoud Khan and other leaders.

On 29 May 1949, the Faqir called a tribal jirga in his headquarters of Gurwek and asked Pakistan to accept Pashtunistan as an independent state. He published a Pashto-language newspaper, Ghāzī, from Gurwek to promote his ideas. Afghanistan also provided financial support to the Pashtunistan movement under the leadership of the Faqir. Faqir also established a rifle factory in Gurwek with the material support provided by the government of Afghanistan.

In January 1950, a Pashtun loya jirga in Razmak appointed the Faqir of Ipi as the first president of the National Assembly for Pashtunistan.

In 1953–1954, the Royal Pakistani Air Force's No. 14 Squadron led an operation from Miran Shah airbase and heavily bombarded the Faqir's compound in Gurwek.

Although he himself never surrendered until his death, his movement diminished after 1954 when his commander-in-chiefsurrendered to the Pakistani authorities.

== Gathering at Razmak ==
Changing political circumstances, including Pakistan’s use of force against his rebellion and the conduct of India and Afghanistan, led the Faqir of Ipi to reconsider his position. He came to believe that the activities of India and Afghanistan were not serving the interests of Islam or the Pashtuns, but were aimed at weakening the newly established state of Pakistan. Later, while addressing a gathering at Razmak, the Faqir of Ipi stated that the Government of Afghanistan had misled him and deceived him in the name of Islam. He instructed his supporters not to cooperate with any future Afghan-backed plan carried out in his name against Pakistan. As a result of this and under diplomatic pressure from Pakistan, Afghanistan issued a public warning to Faqir of Ipi asking him to refrain from activities against the security of Pakistan.

== Death ==
The Faqir of Ipi died at night on 16 April 1960. Long suffering from asthma, during his last days, he was too sick to walk a few steps. His funeral prayers or Namaz-I-Janaza was held at Gurwek led by Maulavi Pir Rehman.

== Faqir Aipee Road ==
Faqir Aipee Road, a main artery connecting I.J.P. Road to the Kashmir Highway in Islamabad, is named after the Faqir of Ipi.

== See also ==
- Pashtunistan independence movement
- Waziristan
- Mulla Powinda
- Sartor Faqir
- Umra Khan
