= Chak-e-Arsala Khan, Kashmir =

Chak-e-Arsala Khan or Chak-e-Arsal Khan is a village in the district of Baramulla in union territory of Jammu and Kashmir.
