= Shaktu =

Pakistani river

Shaktu, (Pashto: شکتو), is a river in the Khyber Pakhtunkhwa province of Pakistan. The Shaktu is one of the principal rivulets in the area, flowing southward from the western slopes of the Sulaiman Mountains toward the Indus basin, and, like other mountain streams in the region, becomes swift and hazardous during the monsoon rains of July and August.

A small dam has been constructed across the river in the Bannu District. The river also serves as a natural boundary between the Wazir and Mashud tribes in Waziristan.
