= Arsala Khan (Pakistani politician) =

Member of Pakistani National Legislature

Malik Arsala Khan Dawar is a former member of Pakistan's National Legislature. He was returned, as an independent, for the National Assembly's thirtieth district for the term October 15, 1993, to November 5, 1996.

According to a 2003 report, he was planning to run again, in North Waziristan. 2003 marked the first time citizens of Pakistan's Federated Tribal Areas were to be allowed a direct franchise, and Arsala Khan chose to withdraw his candidacy in favor of Maulana Deendar, a respected traditional tribal chief.
