= Gambila River =

River in Afghanistan and Pakistan

Coordinates: 32°37′N 71°00′E

The Gambila River (Pashto and Urdu: دریائے گمبیلا), also called the Tochi River (دریائے توچی), is located in Khost Province, Afghanistan, and North Waziristan and Bannu District, northwestern Pakistan.

The source of the river lies in the hills six miles south of the Spīn Ghar range, the source of the Kurram River, to which it runs parallel and finally joins. It borders North Waziristan while the Gomal River borders South Waziristan.

The Gambila is an important river for the inhabitants of the Dawar valley, as it serves to irrigate a large area of land that it runs through, particularly that belonging to the Takhti Khel Marwats, Bakkakhel Wazirs, and Miri and Barakzai Bannuchis.

== See also ==
- District Bannu
- Tochi Valley
- Ghoriwala
