= Gilaman Wazir =

Pashto poet

- ګیلامن وزیر
- Born: Hazrat Naeem; 1 March 1992; Asadkhel, Razmak Tehsil, North Waziristan, Federally Administered Tribal Areas, Pakistan
- Died: 11 July 2024 (aged 32); Islamabad, Pakistan
- Resting place: Asadkhel, Razmak Tehsil, North Waziristan, Khyber Pakhtunkhwa, Pakistan
- Occupations: Political activist; Poet
- Political party: Pashtun Tahafuz Movement
- Children: 5

Hazrat Naeem (Note: Pashto: حضرت نعیم) (1 March 1992 – 11 July 2024), commonly known by his pen name Gilaman Wazir, (Note: Pashto: ګیلامن وزیر) was an Afghan Pashtun political activist and Pashto poet who was one of the senior members of the Pashtun Tahafuz Movement (PTM). Gilaman was known for his activism advocating for the rights of ethnic Pashtuns in Pakistan. He was a key figure in the PTM, utilizing his poetry and digital platforms to raise awareness and mobilize support for Pashtun rights.

== Early life ==
Gilaman was born in the village of Asadkhel, located in the Razmak Tehsil of North Waziristan, Pakistan. This region has long been a site of significant conflict and unrest, which deeply influenced his perspectives and activism. Growing up in an environment marked by political and social turmoil, Gilaman developed a strong sense of identity and purpose, leading him to become a vocal advocate for Pashtun rights.

== Activism and advocacy ==
Gilaman's journey as an activist was marked by his loud vocal criticism of the Pakistani government and military. He often wore the three-colored Afghan republican flag. In accordance with his poetic wishes, he was also buried wrapped in this flag. His poetry, known for its progressive and patriotic themes, resonated deeply with the youth and played a crucial role in spreading the message of Pashtuns.

== Arrest and torture ==
On 6 February 2020, Gilaman was arrested by Bahraini security forces, while working as a laborer. Gilaman was arrested on an Interpol 'Red Notice' issued at Pakistan's request and deported back to Pakistan. On March 8, Bahraini authorities extradited Gilaman to Pakistan, where he was immediately detained and subjected to severe hard torture. He reported experiencing sleep deprivation, electro shocks, dog bites, blindfolding, fingernail extraction, and physical beatings.

== Attack and death ==
On July 7, 2024, Gilaman was attacked in Islamabad, allegedly by Azad Dawar and his associates. He suffered severe head injuries and was admitted to the Pakistan Institute of Medical Sciences (PIMS). Despite exhaustive efforts to save his life, the severity of his injuries proved fatal.

== Funeral and reactions ==
Gilaman's death sparked widespread grief and condemnation, resonating deeply both in Afghanistan and Khyber Pakhtunkhwa, as well as internationally. His funeral procession, which transported his body from Islamabad to North Waziristan, was attended by tens of thousands of mourners. Prominent figures, including former Afghan Presidents Hamid Karzai and Ashraf Ghani, cricket players like Rashid Khan, singers like Javid Amarkhil, politicians like Mahmood Khan Achakzai, and influencers and parties like Pashtoons Social Democratic Party, publicly expressed their condolences. Protests were held worldwide, including in the United States, the United Kingdom, Germany, France, and Austria. Afghan singer Naghma started a GoFundMe campaign that raised over $125,000 for the family.

== Legacy and impact ==
Gilaman left behind a powerful legacy through his poetry and activism. His work continues to inspire many in the Pashtun community and beyond, highlighting issues of state violence, repression, and human rights struggles.

== Personal life ==
Gilaman was married and had five children: three daughters and two sons.
