= Miranshah =

Miranshah میران شاہ میران شاه
- City
- Location within Khyber Pakhtunkhwa Location within Pakistan
- Coordinates: 33°0′9″N 70°4′8″E
- Country: Pakistan
- Province: Khyber Pakhtunkhwa
- District: North Waziristan
- Tehsil: Miran Shah
- Elevation: 930 m (3,050 ft)

Population (2023)
  - Total: 4,131
- Time zone: UTC+5 (PST)
- Calling code: 0928

Mīrānshāh (Urdu: میران شاہ) (Pashto: میران شاه) is a main town in the region that is the administrative headquarters of North Waziristan District, Khyber Pakhtunkhwa province of Pakistan. Miranshah lies on the banks of the Tochi River in a wide valley surrounded by the foothills of the Hindu Kush mountains. It is located at an elevation of about 930 metres (3,050 ft), 17 kilometres (11 mi) from the Pakistan-Afghanistan border (Durand Line). The nearest city in Pakistan is Bannu, about 55 kilometres (34 mi) to the east, while the nearest city across the border in Afghanistan is Khost, 60 kilometres (37 mi) to the northwest.

The city has a shrinking population of only 4,361, and it has only 356 households. This makes it the least populous urban area in Bannu Division, but it is also the only urbanized area in the entire region of North Waziristan, and also the entire Waziristan region, a mountainous area that has 99% of its 1.22 million residents living in rural areas. Miranshah remains a regional business hub for surrounding rural areas that visit the bazaar for day-to-day requirements. Miranshah bazaar is become a hustling during daytimes while it remains less busy during late hours.

== Administration ==
Miranshah is the administrative headquarters of North Waziristan District, in the former Federally Administered Tribal Areas of Pakistan (FATA). In 2018, FATA was merged into the Khyber Pakhtunkhwa province of Pakistan.

== History ==
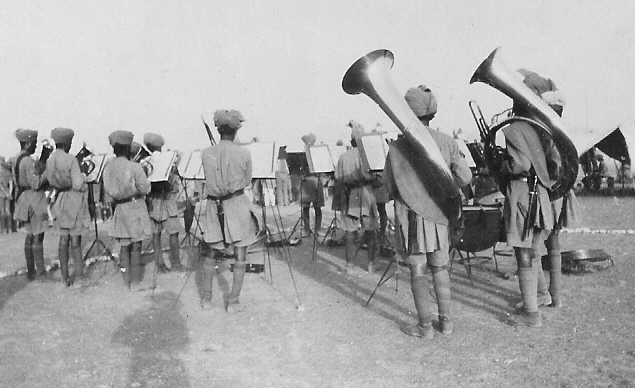
25th Punjabis (now 9 Punjab, Pakistan Army) regimental band at Miram Shah, NWFP, 1917

Miranshah was named after the Timurid ruler, Miran Shah, the son of Timur.

In 1905, the British constructed Miranshah Fort to control North Waziristan.

In the early 1950s, the Pakistan Air Force (PAF) and the "Tochi Scouts" of Pakistan's paramilitary Frontier Corps carried out counter-insurgency operations from Miranshah Airfield and Miranshah Fort against the insurgency fomented by the rebellious General Shudikhel Dawar and Mirzali Khan (Faqir of Ipi). In the 1950s, Miranshah was also the site of a weapons firing range of the PAF, which was located next to the Miranshah Airfield.

After 9/11, Miranshah gained prominence in the United States-led war on terror and has witnessed numerous drone strikes by the US Central Intelligence Agency targeting alleged militants hiding in the town and the surrounding foothills. Miranshah and its surrounding areas have also witnessed fighting between militants and Pakistani military and paramilitary forces.

== Demographics ==
=== Population ===
Historical population
Year	Pop.	±% p.a.
1951	...	—
1961	...	—
1972	3,797	—
1981	...	—
1998	5,965	—
2017	4,364	−1.63%
2023	4,131	−0.91%

As of the 2023 census, Miranshah had a population of 4,131.

== Notable places ==
Miranshah has a historical fort built by the British in 1905, which, since Pakistan's independence on 14 August 1947, has been used as a garrison by the "Tochi Scouts" of Pakistan's Frontier Corps. The town also has a 7,000 ft. long airfield, which is used for both civil and military purposes.

Other notable places include a bazaar, a sports stadium, a primary school, a secondary school and a college.

== See also ==
- Waziristan
- North Waziristan District
- Bannu Division
- Bannu
