= North Waziristan District =

Third-tier administrative unit of Pakistan

North Waziristan District ضلع شمالی وزیرستان شمالي وزیرستان ولسوالۍ
- District
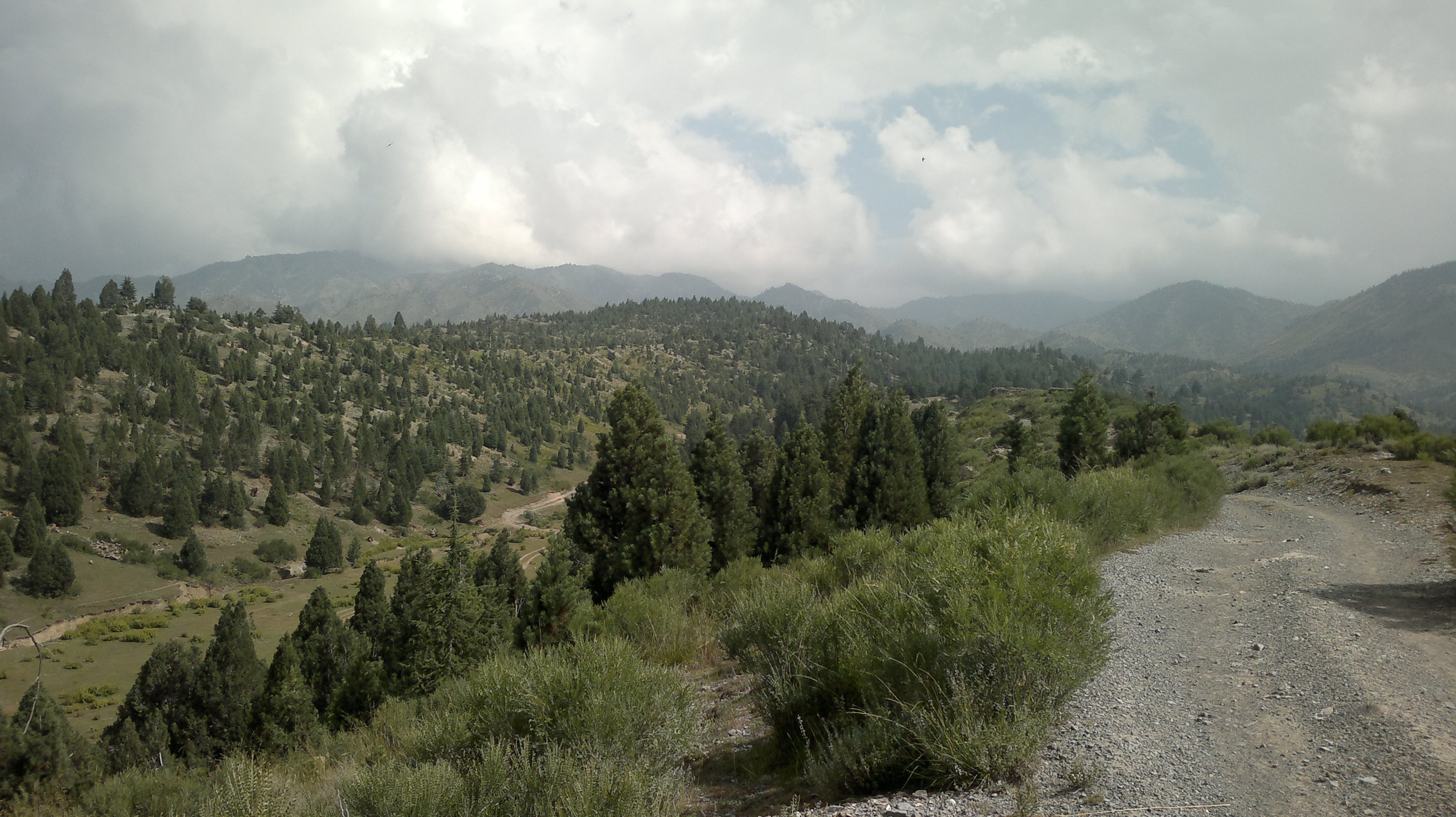
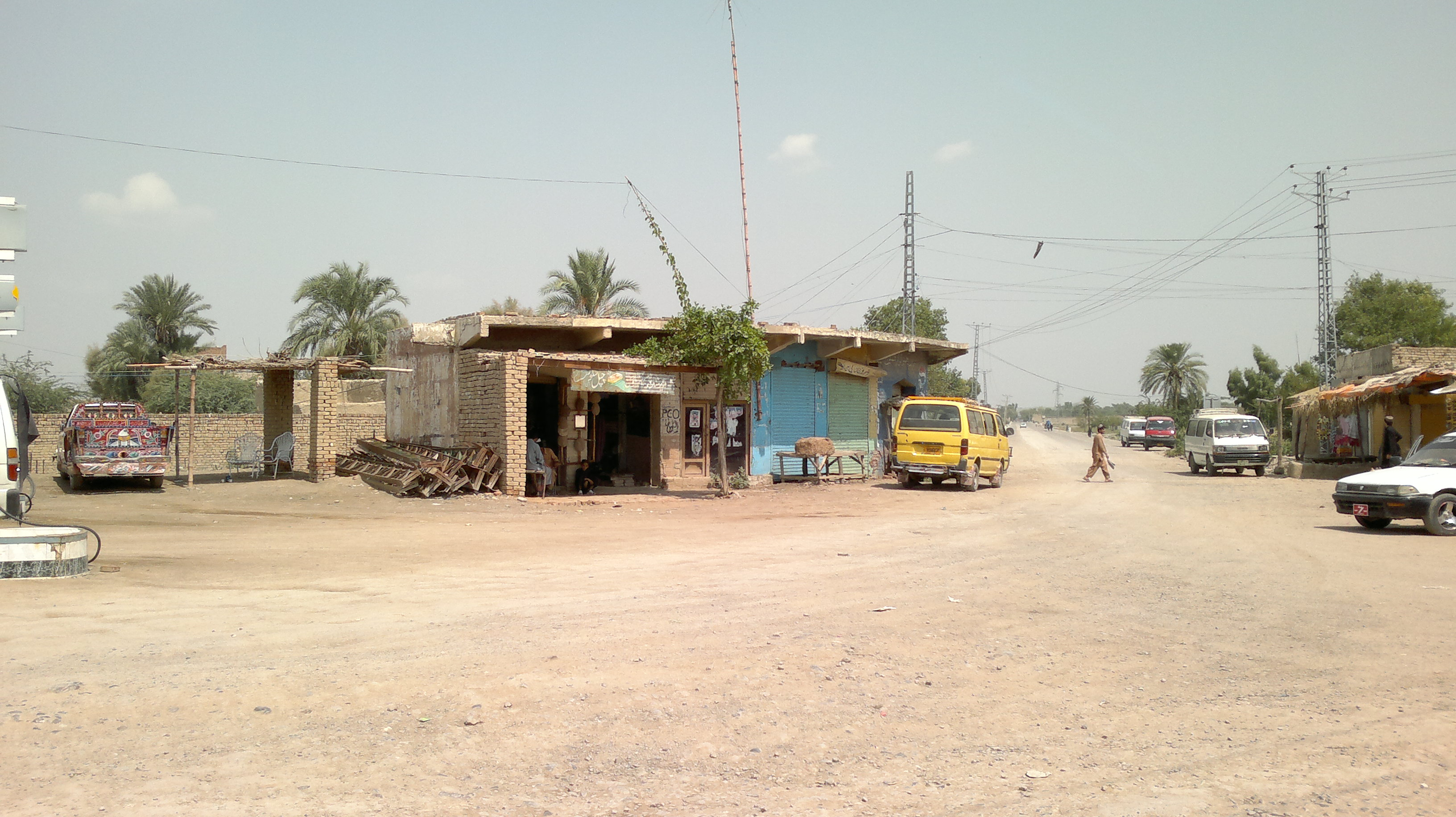
- Top: Shawal Valley; Bottom: street in Mir Ali

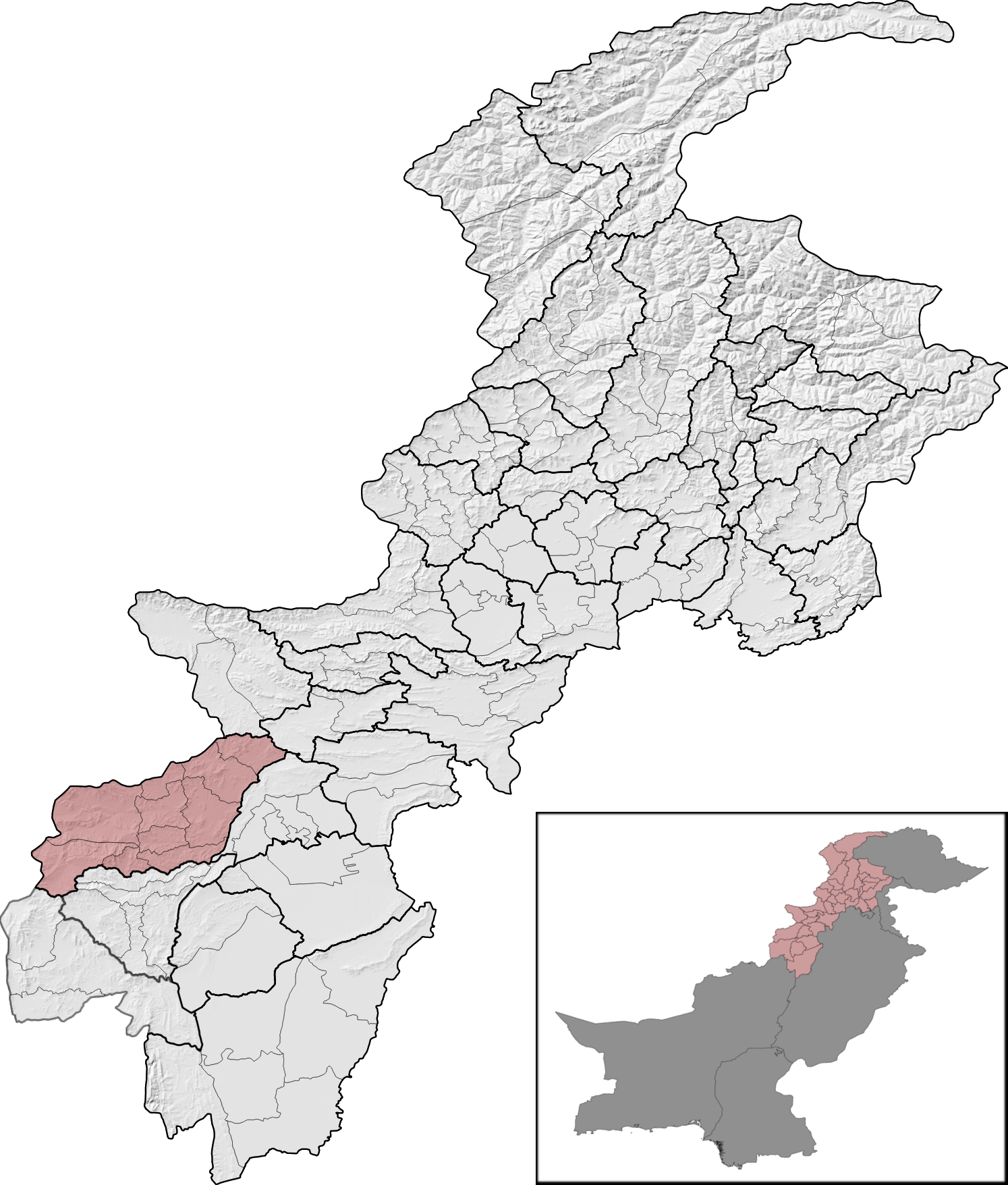
- North Waziristan District (red) in Khyber Pakhtunkhwa
- Country: Pakistan
- Province: Khyber Pakhtunkhwa
- Division: Bannu
- Established: 1910 (as an agency of Federally Administered Tribal Areas)
- Headquarters: Miranshah
- Number of Tehsils: 9

Government
  - Type: District Administration
  - Mayor: N/A
  - Deputy Commissioner: Manzoor Ahmed Afridi
  - District Police Officer: Farhan Khan (BPS-18 PSP)

Area
  - District: 4,707 km^{2} (1,817 sq mi)

Population (2023)
  - District: 693,137
  - Density: 147.3/km^{2} (381.4/sq mi)
  - Urban: 4,131 (0.60%)
  - Rural: 689,201

Literacy
  - Literacy rate: Total: 32.82%; Male: 46.94%; Female: 18.03%
- Time zone: UTC+5 (PST)
- Main language: Pashto
- Website: northwaziristan.kp.gov.pk

North Waziristan District (Pashto: شمالي وزیرستان ولسوالۍ, Urdu: ضلع شمالی وزیرستان) is a district of Bannu Division in the Khyber Pakhtunkhwa province of Pakistan. It is the northern part of Waziristan, a mountainous region of northwest Pakistan, bordering Afghanistan and covering 4,707 square kilometres (1,817 sq mi). The capital city of North Waziristan is Miranshah.

== Overview and history ==
North Waziristan comprises the area west and south-west of Khyber Pakhtunkhwa between the Kurram River (Tochi) to the north and the Gomal River to the south. Miranshah is district headquarter of North Waziristan. The city of Bannu lies immediately to the east, while the largest town on the Afghan side of the border is Khost.

North Waziristan is divided into the three subdivisions of Mirali, Miran Shah, and Razmak. The three subdivisions are further divided into nine tehsils: Datta Khel Tehsil, Dossali Tehsil, Gharyum Tehsil, Ghulam Khan Tehsil, Mir Ali Tehsil, Miran Shah Tehsil, Razmak Tehsil, Shewa Tehsil, Spinwam Tehsil.

=== British Raj (1894–1947) ===
The British entered Waziristan in 1894. After the British military operations in 1894–95, Waziristan was divided into two "agencies", North Waziristan and South Waziristan. The two parts have quite distinct characteristics, though both tribes are subgroups of the Wazir tribe, after which the region is named.

=== War on Terror ===
In 2014, about 98,640 people were reported to be internally displaced from North Waziristan as a result of Operation Zarb-e-Azb, a military offensive against militant extremists launched by the Pakistan Army along the Pak-Afghan border.

=== Creation of district ===
In 2018 after approval by Pakistan's parliament, the Federally Administered Tribal Areas of Pakistan were merged into Khyber Pakhtunkhwa Province, the former North Waziristan Agency (which had been a part of FATA) then became a district.

== Administration ==
North Waziristan District is currently subdivided into nine tehsils.

Tehsil	Area (km²)	Pop. (2023)	Density (ppl/km²) (2023)	Literacy rate (2023)	Union Councils
Datta Khel Tehsil	1,807	92,196	100.53	30.63%	
Dossali Tehsil	250	50,524	100.29	33.02%	
Gharyum Tehsil	320	18,931	102.01	17.74%	
Ghulam Khan Tehsil	191	31,015	99.33	8.44%	
Mir Ali Tehsil	605	229,647	107.7	38.31%	
Miran Shah Tehsil	402	123,317	102.02	36.53%	
Razmak Tehsil	191	49,367	134.63	26.62%	
Shewa Tehsil	393	44,126	112.28	38.36%	
Spinwam Tehsil	548	54,209	99.82	23.47%	

=== Provincial Assembly ===
Member of Provincial Assembly	Party affiliation	Constituency	Year
Muhammad Iqbal Khan	Pakistan Tehreek-e-Insaf	PK-111 North Waziristan-I	2018
Mir Kalam Wazir	Independent	PK-112 North Waziristan-II	2018

== Demographics ==
Historical population
Year	Pop.	±% p.a.
1951	128,235	—
1961	159,470	+2.20%
1972	250,663	+4.20%
1981	238,910	−0.53%
1998	361,246	+2.46%
2017	540,546	+2.14%
2023	693,332	+4.24%

As of the 2023 census, North Waziristan district has 99,595 households and a population of 693,332. The district has a sex ratio of 104.71 males to 100 females and a literacy rate of 32.82%: 46.94% for males and 18.03% for females. 254,259 (36.68% of the surveyed population) are under 10 years of age. 4,131 (0.60%) live in urban areas. 2,170 (0.31%) people in the district were from religious minorities, mainly Christians. Pashto was the predominant language, spoken by 99.66% of the population.

== Mining ==
The following minerals have been found in the area:

- Copper associated with volcanics at Boya

== Notable people ==
- Arsala Khan, Pakistani politician
- Mohammed Wasim, Pakistani cricketer
- Mohsin Dawar, Pakistani politician
- Faqir of Ipi, Pashtun Freedom Fighter
- Gilaman Wazir, Pashto poet
- Mir Kalam, Pakistani politician

== Places of interest ==
Miran Shah is the headquarters of North Waziristan District, It is connected with Bannu and other important places in the district by metalled roads. This town houses the offices of all government departments in the agency and also serves as a market centre for people of the area.

Razmak and Shawaal Valleys are both summer resorts for the local Waziristanis and beautiful tourist spots for tourists, thousands of tourists visit here annually.

Razmak Cadet College is one of the most famous and historical educational institutions of Pakistan, and students from across the country come to study here.

== See also ==
- Bannu District
- Miranshah
- South Waziristan District
