= Sher Afzal Marwat =

Pakistani lawyer and politician

The Honourable Sher Afzal Khan MNA and Lawyer
- شیر افضل خان
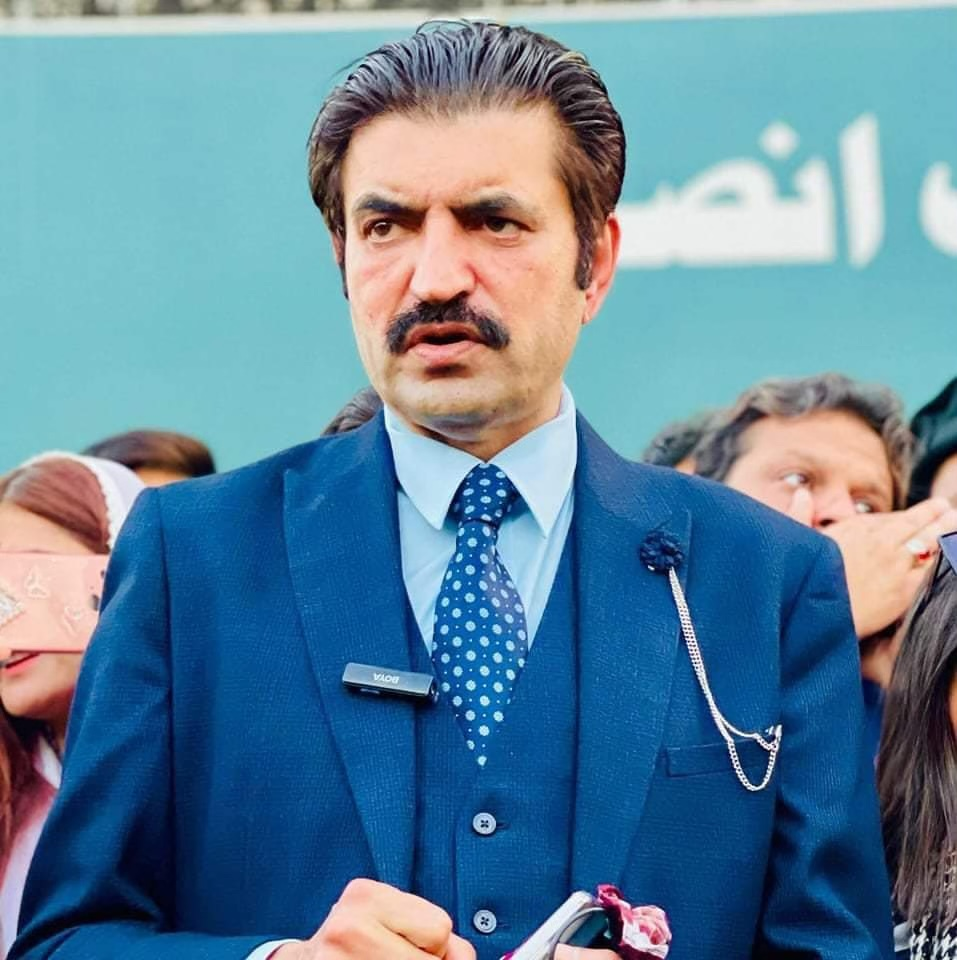
- Khan in 2024

Member of the National Assembly of Pakistan
- Incumbent
- Assumed office 29 February 2024
- Constituency: NA-41 Lakki Marwat

Personal details
- Born: 4 April 1971 Begu Khel, Bannu District, North-West Frontier Province, Pakistan
- Party: INDEPENDENT
- Other political affiliations: PTI (2018-2025); JUI (F) (2008-2017)
- Parent: Muhammad Azeem Khan Begokhel (father)
- Occupation: Lawyer; Politician

Sher Afzal Khan (Urdu: شیر افضل خان), also known as Sher Afzal Marwat, for tribal reasons, is a Pakistani politician who is member of the National Assembly of Pakistan since 29 February 2024. Marwat was born into a politically active family in the village of Begu Khel, located near Lakki Marwat. He began his career in journalism with Business Recorder and Aaj newspaper before transitioning to law. As a lawyer, he represented several Pakistan Tehreek-e-Insaf (PTI) politicians, including former chairman Imran Khan

In 2008, Marwat stepped into politics when he joined the Jamiat Ulema-e-Islam (F). In 2017, he joined Pakistan Tehreek-e-Insaf (PTI). He participated in 2018 Pakistani general election on the platform of PTI but he was unsuccessful. In November 2023, he was appointed as the senior vice president of the party. In the 2024 Pakistani general election, Marwat secured a National Assembly seat. Marwat has been at the center of many internal party conflicts and has publicly criticized several leaders of PTI.

In September 2023, he was part of a physical altercation with a Pakistan Muslim League (N) senator during a live television program. Additionally, in 2024, a video emerged of Marwat striking an individual at a party rally, which he later justified as disciplining his "personal guard." In December 2023, he was detained under public order laws after attending a lawyers' convention, only to be released by court order days later. In 2024, he was briefly arrested over allegations of illegal construction near the Thalian Motorway Interchange but was released shortly after.

In 2024, he criticized Islamabad High Court judges for not taking legal action regarding alleged interference by the Inter-Services Intelligence, advocating for a stronger judicial response. Marwat also made controversial claims implicating Saudi Arabia and the United States in the ousting of former Prime Minister Imran Khan, though PTI later distanced itself from his statements, and Marwat clarified they were personal opinions.

== Early life and education ==
Sher Afzal Marwat was born into a politically active family in the village of Begu Khel, located near Lakki Marwat. His father, Muhammad Azeem Khan Begu Khel, participated in local body elections and served as the chairman of district and tehsil councils. His father was also a member of the peace committee in Lakki Marwat and was killed in a targeted attack by extremists in January 2012.

Marwat received his primary education in Begu Khel. He later attended Wensom College in Dera Ismail Khan, where he completed his Higher Secondary Certificate examination. Following this, he graduated from Lakki Marwat College. During his school years, Marwat actively participated in speech competitions held in Lakki Marwat, Bannu, and Dera Ismail Khan, often achieving success.

He pursued higher education at the University of Peshawar, earning an MA in History and an M Journalism. During this period, he worked with the Business Recorder, an English-language newspaper, and the Urdu daily Aaj, published in Peshawar. Marwat also completed an LLB from the University of Peshawar and later transitioned to a career in law.

== Legal and professional career ==
Marwat started as a judicial officer before serving in the Estate Office on deputation, later becoming Director General of the Federal Government Employees Housing Authority (FGEHA).

As a lawyer he represented several Pakistan Tehreek-e-Insaf (PTI) politicians, including former chairman Imran Khan.

== Political career ==
=== Jamiat Ulema-e-Islam (F) ===
Before joining PTI, he was affiliated with the Jamiat Ulema-e-Islam (F) from 2008 until 15 October 2017, when he announced in a jirga that he had quit the party. He justified his decision by saying, "I need not to remain in a party where I get no respect at all and where the leaders have no time to address the problems of people of my area".

=== Pakistan Tehreek e Insaf ===
On 16 April 2018, he joined the PTI. After joining PTI, he contested the 2018 Pakistani general election and the 2018 Khyber Pakhtunkhwa provincial election from NA-36 Lakki Marwat and PK-91 Lakki Marwat-I, respectively, as an independent candidate. He received 92 votes in NA-36 Lakki Marwat, faring at number eighteen out of total eighteen candidates, with the winning candidate getting 92,000 votes. He got 33 votes in PK-91 Lakki Marwat-I, faring at number seventeen out of total seventeen candidates, with the winning candidate getting 25,242 votes. On 22 November 2023, he was appointed senior vice president of PTI.

In the 2024 Pakistani general election, he was elected as member of the National Assembly of Pakistan by securing 117,996 Votes. He defeated Maulana Asjad Mahmood of JUI-F; Son of Maulana Fazal-ur-Rehman by a heavy margin of 45,311 votes. He took oath on 28 February 2024.

In March 2024, Chairman of PTI Gohar Ali Khan announced that Marwat would be nominated by the party for the Public Accounts Committee (PAC) under Imran Khan's recommendation. However, on 25 April, PTI opted to appoint Hamid Khan as the PAC chairman instead

On May 19, Sher Afzal Marwat challenged the constitutionality behind the appointment of Ishaq Dar as Deputy Prime Minister, in a petition before the Lahore High Court. He also requested that the court award him for the petition and asked “the petitioner may please be awarded compensation for bringing this important petition before this honorable court”.

==== Conflicts within PTI ====
On 24 February 2024, Marwat received a show-cause notice from PTI. In his response, Marwat asserted that only PTI founder Imran Khan held authority over him. He stated, "If Imran Khan asks me to apologize, I will." Marwat expressed that a more appropriate approach would have been for Omar Ayub Khan to personally contact him and request a public apology. The show-cause notice was issued following Marwat's allegations against former chairman Gohar Ali Khan. Marwat claimed Gohar was "removed" as chairman due to "unsatisfactory" performance, emphasizing that although Gohar was a gentleman, his performance fell short. Marwat stated that Gohar failed to meet the expectations of the party workers, emphasizing the necessity for constant activity in running a party office. Regarding the post-election period, Marwat criticized the party leadership's approach, suggesting that Gohar should have taken the lead after the polls but failed to do so. PTI demanded that Marwat submit an apology letter within two days, warning of action in accordance with party policy if an unsatisfactory response was received. Marwat declared his determination to continue criticizing other party members, asserting, "I don't back down in the face of adversity." He vowed to provide "satisfactory" responses to leaders who accused him. Marwat has consistently criticized other party leaders, including founder member Hamid Khan, on various occasions. Marwat criticized the manner in which the show-cause notice was issued, alleging it was designed to weaken PTI and divert attention from protests. He urged party leaders to refrain from solely relying on Imran Khan for every decision.

On 15 March 2024, Marwat criticized PTI and its leadership, attributing the loss of over 80 seats in national and provincial assemblies to the party's own "flawed decisions." Marwat specifically highlighted two decisions that he believed led to PTI losing reserved seats after the elections on February 8. According to him, PTI's choice to withdraw from forming an electoral alliance with Rabita Jamiat Ulema-e-Islam (RJUI) and later opting for a deal with Pakistan Tehreek-e-Insaf Nazriati (PTI-N) dealt a significant blow to the party. He emphasized the need for an internal inquiry within the party to ascertain responsibility for these decisions. "If these decisions had not been made, we would not have lost the electoral symbol," Marwat added, suggesting that PTI candidates could have contested elections under the RJUI platform even after losing the 'bat' symbol. Marwat identified PTI's decision to ally with Majlis Wahdat-e-Muslimeen (MWM) to secure reserved seats as the second mistake of the party.

Marwat also openly criticized the affiliation with the Sunni Ittehad Council (SIC), deeming it a misstep. The repercussions of Marwat's statement were immediate, with Sahibzada Hamid Raza choosing to boycott PTI's conference on Islamophobia in Islamabad. Insiders within PTI disclosed that Marwat's comments deeply offended Raza, resulting in a breakdown in their alliance. Tensions escalated further after a meeting between the SIC and PTI's core committee, during which Raza voiced suspicions about PTI's motives. Subsequently, Hamid Raza took to the social media platform X to express his dissatisfaction, urging PTI members to resolve their internal disputes privately.

On 17 March 2024, Marwat acknowledged widespread corruption within his party's former administration in Khyber Pakhtunkhwa (KP). Speaking during a live session on X Spaces, he asserted, "During the previous PTI government, individuals didn't just become billionaires, but trillionaires [through corruption]." He further claimed, "Former KP chief minister Mahmood Khan now earns Rs2.5 million daily from one of his mines."

In late March 2024, Marwat participated in an Iftar dinner in Abbottabad, where party dissidents and former speaker of Provincial Assembly of Khyber Pakhtunkhwa, Mushtaq Ahmed Ghani were in attendance. Notably, several other MNAs and MPAs from Abbottabad, including Ali Asghar Khan, were conspicuously absent from the gathering. The dinner, hosted by Marwat’s close associate Shehzad Gul, who had previously been expelled from the party, raised concerns among party members. Asghar, the general secretary of PTI Khyber Pakhtunkhwa and MNA from Abbottabad, issued a message to PTI workers. In his message, Asghar underscored the significance of party loyalty and unity, especially during challenging times. He stressed the imperative of offering unwavering support to the party chief Imran Khan and cautioned against actions that could tarnish the party’s image. Asghar's communication reflected the dissatisfaction among PTI workers regarding what they perceived as a disregard for party principles during the event. He emphasized the importance of prioritizing party allegiance over personal relationships. Asghar noted that Marwat's arrival for the event in the company of an individual previously expelled by the party deeply disappointed loyal workers, causing them considerable distress. Despite Marwat's assertion of personal friendship, Asghar expressed dissatisfaction with his actions. He suggested that the invitations extended to other PTI leaders and workers for the event seemed to be a deliberate attempt to undermine the party's interests during its challenging period. Asghar stressed the necessity of giving precedence to party loyalty over personal ties, indicating that the conduct of certain party members had disregarded this principle. He urged all members to prioritize the welfare of the party over personal affiliations.

Following these incidents, PTI founder Imran Khan took action on 3 April 2024, by removing Marwat from significant roles within the party due to his contentious and outspoken political stance. Dissatisfaction among PTI followers and supporters regarding his management of media affairs led to calls for his dismissal from key positions. The decision to remove him was based on recommendations from the party's core committee. Additionally, Marwat's name was excluded from the list of attendees for the meeting with Imran Khan, and the PTI leadership informed the jail administration of this decision. Salman Ahmad, a staunch PTI member supported Khan's decision of sidelining Marwat stating that Marwat is a "wrong number" in the party signaling possible disloyalty with party and alignment with military establishment using the example of Khurram Hameed Rokhri, another PTI dissenter and pro-establishment politician.

On 6 April 2024, just days after Marwat was stripped of key party positions and excluded from the list of individuals slated to meet with Imran Khan at Adiala Jail, Khan alleged that certain party leaders were in communication with the "establishment." It remains uncertain whether Marwat's marginalization is related to this accusation. On May 8, Marwat claimed that there was a conspiracy of the "PTI establishment" against him and claimed that Omar Ayub Khan and Shibli Faraz were misleading Imran Khan. The next day Omar Ayub Khan announced that the decision to remove Sher Afzal Marwat from various party bodies was taken with the approval of Imran Khan, due to the former's comments on Saudi Arabia; Marwat was also shown a show-cause notice for statements against other party leaders.

In June, Marwat stated that "I am not upset with PTI founder. I am saddened by the way he announced party decisions." Later in the month he demanded the resignation of party leader Shibli Faraz, to get rid of a "qabza mafia," claiming that he had failed in leading the party in the Senate. Sher Afzal Marwat claimed on July 5 that Imran Khan had "...himself told me that Fawad’s role in the regime change operation was suspicious,” and that Fawad Chaudhry was in a "cohort" with Gen Qamar Bajwa. On July 12, it was reported that PTI leadership had suspended Marwat's party membership for violating party discipline and making "derogatory remarks" on Imran Khan. On Twitter (X) Marwat claimed that "[a]fter consulting around two dozen core committee members and senior party leaders, I announce that yesterday's expulsion order was neither discussed nor brought to the core committee's attention. It was also unknown to the party chairman, Barrister Gohar, who presided over the meeting."

On August 17 it was reported that Sher Afzal Marwat had met with Imran Khan at Adiala Jail, with Marwat announcing that “[o]n Khan’s instructions, I have ended any reservation I had against the [party] leadership. I have forgiven everyone from my end. The matter is now buried after talking with Khan.” Further stating that “No one can eliminate the love between me and Khan with backbiting.” When questioned over differences with Omar Ayub and Shibli Faraz, Marwat replied "There were differences before which have now come to an end. You will no longer hear anything from my mouth about them." After the meeting Marwat was tasked with leading nation-wide protests and a party rally on August 22.

== Views ==
=== 2024 IHC judges' letter ===
Regarding the controversy surrounding the letter penned by Islamabad High Court (IHC) judges to the Supreme Court of Pakistan (SCP), alleging interference by the Inter-Services Intelligence, he believed that the IHC judges should have taken legal action, such as issuing contempt notices, against those involved in the interference instead of addressing the matter through a letter to the SCP.

=== Foreign involvement in Imran Khan's ousting ===
On 17 April 2024, Marwat claimed that Saudi Arabia, along with the United States, played a role in Imran Khan's removal from power in April 2022. He also accused Saudi Arabia of being a poodle to the United States in the region. These comments were made as Faisal bin Farhan Al Saud visited Pakistan. However, PTI distanced itself from Marwat's statements, asserting that there was no evidence to suggest Saudi Arabia's involvement in Khan's ousting. Marwat later clarified his remarks saying “I never claimed in my interview that this stance had any official backing of the PTI."

== Controversies ==
=== Physical altercations ===
On 27 September 2023, during a live TV program on Express News hosted by Javed Chaudhry, Sher Afzal Marwat argued with PML(N) senator Afnan Ullah Khan. The argument escalated to a physical altercation, with Marwat initially hitting Khan.

While Sher Afzal openly acknowledged his involvement, there were conflicting accounts from PML(N) politicians and media influencers, who claimed that Sher Afzal had sustained injuries. According to the program's host, Javed Chaudhry, Marwat threw the first punch. Subsequently, Marwat found himself on the floor, and Afnanullah proceeded to mount him, delivering a series of punches to Marwat's face. Afnanullah proceeded to file an FIR against Marwat for initiating the fight. This incident garnered widespread attention and sparked debates in both political and media circles.

In April 2024, Marwat became entangled in another controversy following the emergence of a video showing him striking an individual during a party rally in Peshawar. The footage depicts the Marwat delivering a slap to the man amidst a crowd of party supporters. He tried to justify his action by stating that the person he slapped was his "personal guard."

== Arrests ==
=== First arrest ===
Marwat was arrested on Thursday 14 December 2023, after leaving the Lahore High Court premises after attending a lawyers' convention of Lahore High Court Bar Association. A substantial contingent of police apprehended him, and subsequently, the Lahore deputy commissioner issued a 30-day detention order for Marwat. Following the order, the PTI leader was transferred to Kot Lakhpat Jail to serve the designated detention period. On December 18, 2023, Lahore High Court ordered the administration to immediately release the lawyer.

=== Second arrest ===
In July, 2024 a non-bailable arrest warrant was issued by a Rawalpindi Civil Court, over a petition of the Rawalpindi Development Authority (RDA) over illegal construction near Thalian Motorway Interchange. On August 4 Marwat would be arrested in Islamabad and shifted to Golra Police station, being released soon after.

== Electoral history ==
=== 2018 General Elections ===
General election 2018: NA-36 Lakki Marwat
Party	Candidate	Votes	%	±%
MMA	Mohammad Anwar Khan	91,065	45.15	+1.2✞
PTI	Ashfaq Ahmed Khan	81,849	40.58	+.01
Others	Others (fifteen candidates)	28,693	14.23	
Independent	Sher Afzal Marwat	92	.05	
Turnout		210,866	50.06	+12.93
Total valid votes		201,699	95.65	
Rejected ballots		9,167	4.35	
Majority		9,216	4.57	−1.11
Registered electors		421,224		
MMA gain from PTI				

✞Showing change from JUI-F in 2013 to MMA in 2018, of which JUI-F was a component.

=== 2018 KP Provincial Elections ===
Provincial election 2018: PK-91 Lakki Marwat-I
Party	Candidate	Votes	%	±%
MMA	Munawar Khan	25,242		
PTI	Johar Muhammad	21,798		
Independent	Najeebullah Khan	16,078		
Others	Others (thirteen candidates)	10,323		
Independent	Sher Afzal Marwat	33		
Turnout				
Total valid votes				
Rejected ballots				
Majority				
Registered electors				
MMA gain from				

=== 2024 General Elections ===
General election 2024: NA-41 Lakki Marwat
Party	Candidate	Votes	%	±%
Independent	Sher Afzal Marwat	117,988	48.76	+8.17✞
JUI (F)	Asjad Mehmood	68,303	28.23	−16.92✞✞
Independent	Salim Saifullah Khan	46,070	19.04	
Others	Others (thirty six candidates)	9,608	3.97	
Turnout		249,057	48.10	−1.96
Total valid votes		241,969	97.15	+1.5
Rejected ballots		7,088	2.85	-1.5
Majority		49,685	57.89	+53.32
Registered electors		516,745		
Independent gain from MMA				

✞Showing change from PTI in 2018 to Sher Afzal Marwat in 2024 who was backed by PTI
✞✞Showing change from MMA in 2018, of which JUI-F was part, to JUI-F in 2024
