= Saifullah Khan family =

Pakistani business and political family

- Current region: Islamabad, Pakistan
- Origin: Lakki Marwat
- Traditions: Sunni Muslim
- Estate: Saif Group

The Saifullah Khan family, also known as Khans of Marwat, is a prominent business and political family of Pakistan, based in the province of Khyber Pakhtunkhwa and capital city of Pakistan, Islamabad. The family is of Pashtun origin and hails from Lakki Marwat. Saifullah family is also Khans of Marwat tribe of Pashtuns.

== Members ==
- Begum Kulsum Saifullah Khan
- Anwar Saifullah Khan
- Salim Saifullah Khan
- Humayun Saifullah Khan
- Osman Saifullah
- Javed Saifullah
- Jehangir Saifullah Khan
- Rahim Saifullah Khan

== Corruption allegations ==
The Saifullah Khan family's members name appeared in the Panama Papers owning record number of 34 off-shore companies in the British Virgin Islands and Seychelles. The companies also own bank accounts in Hong Kong, Singapore, Ireland and lands in the United Kingdom.

In 2018, National Accountability Bureau started investigation regarding the accumulation of assets beyond known sources of income.

== Offshore companies ==
Since the revelation of the Panama Papers, Saifullah Khan family is considered as the Pakistani family which own the most offshore companies. In January 2018, the National Accountability Court has initiated an inquiry against Saifullah family members regarding the accumulation of assets beyond known sources of income.
