= Aslam Khattak =

Pakistani politician (1908–2008)

Muhammad Aslam Khan Khattak SPk

10th Governor of North-West Frontier Province
- In office 15 February 1973 – 24 May 1974
- President: Zulfikar Ali Bhutto; Fazal Ilahi Chaudhry
- Preceded by: Arbab Sikandar Khan
- Succeeded by: Syed Ghawas

Personal details
- Born: 5 April 1908 Karak, North West Frontier Province, British Raj (now Khyber Pakhtunkhwa, Pakistan
- Died: 10 October 2008 (aged 100) Islamabad, Pakistan
- Relations: Yusuf Khattak (brother); Habibullah Khan Khattak (brother); Kulsum Saifullah Khan (sister); Anwar Saifullah Khan (nephew); Salim Saifullah Khan (nephew); Humayun Saifullah Khan (nephew); Mark Humayun (maternal grandson)
- Awards: Sitara-e-Pakistan (Star of Pakistan) Award by the Government of Pakistan in 1958

Muhammad Aslam Khan Khattak, SPk (Pashto: محمد اسلم خان خټک) (Urdu: محمد اسلم خان خٹک) (5 April 1908 – 10 October 2008) was a Pakistani politician and diplomat who was the Governor of North-West Frontier Province (now Khyber Pakhtunkhwa) from 1973 to 1974.

== Early life and education ==
Aslam Khattak used to play tennis, do some swimming and mountaineering in his younger years. Khattak studied history at Brasenose College, Oxford, from 1929 to 1932.

== Career ==
He was born into a Pashtun Khattak family on 5 April 1908 at Karak, British India. Aslam Khattak was the President of a student organization supporting Pakistan Movement in the United Kingdom in the 1930s, serving alongside Dr. Abdur Rahim as Vice President and Chaudhry Rehmat Ali as Secretary. This organization gave the world the name "PAKISTAN". Aslam Khattak was among the three people that signed the pamphlet called 'Now or Never', written by Chaudhry Rehmat Ali in 1933.

Aslam Khattak worked closely with Dr Khan Sahib in the North West Frontier Province's provincial government during his career as a civil servant, and after the independence of Pakistan in 1947, he was assigned a position in Afghanistan where he played a key role in the failed negotiations for a confederation between Pakistan and Afghanistan. In the 1970 elections, he was elected as an independent to the Provincial Assembly of Khyber Pakhtunkhwa from Karak. He then became speaker of the North West Frontier Province's Provincial Assembly in 1972. He also served as Governor of Khyber Pakhtunkhwa briefly after the ouster of the NAP-JUI governor as well, twice posted overseas as an Ambassador of Pakistan.

He was promoted as Minister of Pakistan to Kabul in 1956, and appointed High Commissioner to Australia in December 1959. As a diplomat, he served as ambassador to Iran (1974–1977), Iraq and Afghanistan.

Nominated to Muhammad Zia-ul-Haq's Majlis-e-Shura in the 1980s, he became a trusted political confidante of the Martial Law ruler.

He was elected MNA from his constituency and served as deputy Prime Minister to Prime Minister Muhammad Khan Junejo in 1985. After the restoration of democracy in Pakistan in 1988, he joined the Pakistan Muslim League (N), but was defeated in the Pakistani general election, 1988. Re-elected again in 1990, he again served as Federal Minister in Nawaz Sharif’s first government. Defeated in the 1993 elections, he left the PML (N) shortly before the 1997 election over a difference in the distribution of party tickets for his grandson and son-in-law.

== Death ==
He died, after a protracted illness, at the Pakistan Institute of Medical Sciences (PIMS) hospital, Islamabad on 10 October 2008 at age 100. He also had a history of heart disease.

== Awards and recognition ==
- Sitara-e-Pakistan (Star of Pakistan) Award by the Government of Pakistan in 1958.

== See also ==
- Yusuf Khattak

== Bibliography ==
Aslam Khattak spoke, read and wrote Pashtu, Urdu, Punjabi, Persian, Arabic, French and English. He stated that he did a journalism course from Brussels, and introduced freestyle essays in Pashtu literature in his booklet "Gul Masti". He also said he wrote a Pashtu play, "Da Veno Jam". This was highly commended in the literary supplement of `The Times' (London), when it was later translated into English.

- 'A Pathan Odyssey', an autobiography by Muhammad Aslam Khattak

Political offices
Preceded by Arbab Sikandar Khan	Governor of Khyber-Pakhtunkhwa; 1973–1974	Succeeded by Syed Ghawas
Preceded by Muhammad Khan Junejo	Interior Minister of Pakistan; 1985–1987	Succeeded by Wasim Sajjad
