= Kulsum Saifullah Khan =

Pakistani politician (1924–2014)

Begum Kulsum Saifullah Khan
- Born: 7 December 1924; Karak, Kohat, British India
- Died: 26 December 2014 (aged 90)
- Occupations: Politician and businesswoman
- Spouse: Saifullah Khan (aged 48) (m. 1944; died 1964)
- Awards: Hilal-i-Imtiaz (Crescent of Distinction) Award by the President of Pakistan in 2008

Begum Kulsum Saifullah Khan (7 December 1924 – 26 December 2014) was a Pakistani businesswoman, politician, industrialist and a social worker from Khyber Pakhtunkhwa province of Pakistan. She was chairperson of the Saif Group of companies from 1964 to 1990. Begum Kulsum served as a parliamentarian and a federal minister in Pakistan in the 1970s and 1980s.

== Early life and career ==
Kulsum was born in 1924 in Karak in Kohat into a Pashtun family. She was a sister of two Pakistani politicians of the area Muhammad Aslam Khan Khattak and Yusuf Khattak. Her brother, Habibullah Khan Khattak, was the founder of Bibojee Group.

Kulsum was married to a then well-known businessman of Ghaznikhel Lakki Marwat, Khan Saifullah Khan, who was a Khan of the Marwat Tribe. She had five sons with him: Anwar Saifullah Khan, Salim Saifullah Khan, Humayun Saifullah Khan, Javed Saifullah Khan and the Cardiologist Iqbal Saifullah Khan.

She went ahead and developed her late husband's business to the extent that as of 2017; it is one of the leading business conglomerates of Pakistan in the fields of textiles, power generation, oil and gas exploration and telecommunications industries.

She was jailed during General Zia Ul-Haq's presidency in Pakistan.

== Awards, death and legacy ==
- Hilal-i-Imtiaz (Crescent of Distinction) by the President of Pakistan Pervez Musharraf in 2008.
- Begum Kulsum had the distinction of being the first woman federal minister in Pakistan's history. She had also served as a member of the National Assembly of Pakistan.
- When her husband Saifullah Khan suddenly died on 4 April 1964 at the age of 48, she stepped forward to take over his business despite her lack of formal business training and her responsibilities of raising a family. She later wrote a book on her business management and business dealings called 'Meri Tanha Parwaz' (My Solo Flight) published in 2011.
- In Pakistan, she was socially very active as well. Begum Kulsum was a founding member of All Pakistan Women's Association (APWA) since 1947. She worked closely with and was an advisor to Begum Rana Liaquat Ali Khan, the founder of APWA, till 1951.

== Death ==
- She died on 26 January 2015 at age 91.
