= NA-36 =

NA-36 may refer to:

- NA-36 (Lakki Marwat), a constituency for the National Assembly of Pakistan
- NA-36, a variant of the North American Aviation T-6 Texan aircraft
- Sodium-36 (Na-36 or ^{36}Na), an isotope of sodium
