= Shah Hassan Khel =

- Village
- Location in Pakistan
- Coordinates: 32°25′54″N 70°57′56″E
- Country: Pakistan
- Region: Khyber Pakhtunkhwa
- District: Lakki Marwat District

Population (2011)
  - Total: 4,000 (approx.)
- Time zone: UTC+5 (PST)

Shah Hassan Khel is a village in Pakistan's Khyber Pakhtunkhwa province. It is located to the south of Lakki Marwat, in the Lakki Marwat District, on the Lakki Marwat Road between Lakki Marwat and Shahbaz Azmat Khel. In 2011, it had some 4,000 inhabitants in about 500 households. The village is located between two streams which lead down from a southern tributary of the Tochi River. The area to the south is mountainous, known as the Sheikh Badin Range. Struggling from insecurity from extremist militants since around 2007, the 2010 Lakki Marwat suicide bombing took place here killing at least 105 people and wounding more than 100 others.

== History ==
Historically, Shah Hassan Khel was a village unit of the tehsil of Marwat. Administratively it bordered the village units of Ahmed Khel to the north, Abdul Khel to the southwest, and the southwestern part of Chowki Jand to the south and southeast. In 1992, Marwat tehsil became a part of Lakki Marwat District. The neighbouring villages of Ahmed Khel and Abdul Khel constitute official union councils of the district today.

The first mentions of trouble with the Taliban in the region of Shah Hassan Khel date from early 2007, with extremists taking six hostages at a marriage party and beating up a group of singers. After the 2007 Siege of Lal Masjid, Taliban militants took first control of the Shah Hassan Khel mosque, and soon of the whole village. When Pakistan security forces tried to expunge the militants from the village in the summer of 2009, the village became a ghost town for three months, with all villagers fleeing to other villages close by. After the operation was successfully ended and 24 militants were captured by the Pakistani forces, the villagers returned and organised a lashkar, a village militia to defend themselves and prevent the return of the Taliban. This worked, despite a volunteer of the militia being killed in a skirmish.

=== 2010 terrorist attack ===
On 1 January 2010 a Mitsubishi Pajero suicide bomb car with some 600 pounds of explosives drove into a village square where a crowd was watching a volleyball game played by some members of the lashkar, while most of the elders of the village and the lashkar were meeting in a nearby mosque. The blast caused at least 97 deaths (other sources claim 105 deaths), with a further 40 wounded. An unknown organisation within the Tehrik-i-Taliban Pakistan (TTP) was responsible for the attack, which caused the most fatalities of any TTP attack. The driver of the bomb car was the son of a member of the Shah Hassan Khel lakshar.

In response to the attack, the villages expanded the armed militia to defend the town and to hunt down those responsible for the attack. A boys' school which had also been demolished during the attack was rebuilt and reopened in 2012.

== Geography ==
Shah Hassan Khel is located in northern central Pakistan in Lakki Marwat District of Khyber Pakhtunkhwa. By road it is located 20.4 kilometres (12.7 mi) south of the district town of Lakki Marwat, 84.5 kilometres (52.5 mi) southeast of Bannu, and 167 kilometres (104 mi) south of Kohat. The main road connecting the village, Lakki Marwat Road, stems from the Indus Highway, the N55 road. Like the N55, this road connects Shahbaz Khel in the southwest and Sarai Naurung to the northwest, but bypasses the route, passing through Shah Hassan Khel and the district town of Lakki Marwat en route.

The village is located between two streams which lead down from a southern tributary of the Tochi River. The Indus River flows some way to the east of the village. The area to the south is mountainous, known as the Sheikh Budin Range.
