= Azmat =

Azmat is a masculine given name of Arabic origin. Notable people with the name include:

== Given name ==
- S. Azmat Hassan, Pakistani Ambassador
- Azmat Rana (1951–2015), Pakistani cricketer
- Azmat Saeed (1954–2025), Pakistani judge, justice of the supreme court

== Surname ==
- Ali Azmat (born 1970), Pakistani musician
- Sadia Azmat (born 1987), English stand-up comedian of Pakistani descent
- Azmet Jah (born 1960), crown prince of Hyderabad, India

== See also ==
- Shahbaz Azmat Khel, town in Khyber Pakhtunkhwa, Pakistan
- PNS Azmat
