= NA-41 Lakki Marwat =

Constituency of the National Assembly of Pakistan

- Constituency for the National Assembly of Pakistan
- Region: Lakki Marwat District
- Electorate: 516,745

Current constituency
- Party: Pakistan Tehreek-e-Insaf
- Member: Sher Afzal Marwat
- Created from: NA-36 Lakki Marwat

NA-41 Lakki Marwat (این اے-41، لکی مروت) is a constituency for the National Assembly of Pakistan. It covers the entire district Lakki Marwat. The constituency was known as NA-27 from 1977 to 2018. The name changed to NA-36 Lakki Marwat after the delimitation in 2018 and to NA-41 (Lakki Marwat) after the delimitation in 2022.

== Members of Parliament ==
=== 1977–2002: NA-27 Lakki Marwat ===
Election	Member	Party
1977	Haji Baroz Khan	Independent
1985	Malik Fazle Manon Mehmand	Independent
1988	Haji Qadar Gul Khan	Independent
1990	Haji Baroz Khan	Independent
1993	Haji Baroz Khan	Independent
1997	Haji Baroz Khan	Independent

=== 2002–2018: NA-27 Lakki Marwat ===
Election	Member	Party
2002	Maulana Amanullah Khan	MMA
2008	Humayun Saifullah Khan	PML
2013	Fazal-ur-Rehman	JUI (F)
2013 By-election	Amirullah Marwat	PTI

=== 2018–2022: NA-36 Lakki Marwat ===
Election	Member	Party
2018	Mohammad Anwar Khan	MMA

=== 2024–present: NA-41 Lakki Marwat ===
Election	Member	Party
2024	Sher Afzal Marwat	PTI

== Elections since 2002 ==
=== 2002 general election ===
2002 General Election: NA-27 Lakki Marwat
Party	Candidate	Votes	%	±%
MMA	Maulana Amanullah Khan	65,938	61.56	
PML-Q	Anwar Saifullah Khan	41,171	38.44	
Majority		24,767	23.12	
Turnout		107,109	46.54	
MMA gain from Independent				

A total of 2,078 votes were rejected.

=== 2008 general election ===
2008 General Election: NA-27 Lakki Marwat
Party	Candidate	Votes	%	±%
PML	Humayun Saifullah Khan	61,303	49.62	
MMA	Dr Muhammad Khalid Raza Pir Zakori Sharif	52,315	42.34	−19.22
Independent	Khan Bahader Marwah	5,949	4.82	
ANP	Hamidullah Khan	1,597	1.29	
Independent	Hidayatullah Khan	989	0.80	
Independent	Nasir Muhammad Khan	697	0.56	
Independent	Maulana Hidayatullah	164	0.13	
Independent	Manzoor Ahmad	122	0.10	
Independent	Imran Nawab	108	0.09	
Independent	Munawar Khan	100	0.08	
Independent	Pir Zada Muhammad Raees Khan	75	0.06	
Independent	Rooh ul Amin	69	0.06	
Independent	Tariq Ahmad Khan	59	0.05	
Majority		8,988	7.28	
Turnout		123,547	47.44	+0.90
PML gain from MMA				

A total of 3,874 votes were rejected.

=== 2013 general election ===
2013 General Election: NA-27 Lakki Marwat
Party	Candidate	Votes	%	±%
JUI-F	Fazal-ur-Rehman	85,051	52.95	
PML-N	Salim Saifullah Khan	46,824	29.15	
PTI	Amirullah Marwat	18,405	11.46	
Independent	Muhamad Halim	4,046	2.52	
ANP	Ali Sarwar	2,909	1.81	+0.52
TTP	Ikramullah	986	0.61	
Independent	Faridullah Khan	675	0.42	
Independent	Quadratullah Khan	448	0.28	
Independent	Haji Muhammad Akram Khan	264	0.16	
Independent	Ashgar Ali	219	0.14	
PkMAP	Abdullah Khan	121	0.08	
Independent	Qabool Bibi	120	0.08	
Independent	Amir Nawaz Khan	118	0.07	
PML	Muhammad Javed Anwar Khan	114	0.07	−49.55
Independent	Nisar Ahmad	75	0.05	
Independent	Zahid Ur Rehman	75	0.05	
Independent	Khan Bahader Marwat	54	0.03	−4.79
JUI-N	Sakhi Mar Jan	45	0.03	
Independent	Ishfaq Ahmad Khan	39	0.02	
Independent	Abdur Rahim	37	0.02	
Majority		38,227	23.80	
Turnout		160,625	53.00	+5.56
JUI (F) gain from PML		Swing		

A total of 5,277 votes were rejected.

=== 2013 By-election ===
A by-election took place on 22 August 2013.

2013 General Election: NA-27 Lakki Marwat
Party	Candidate	Votes	%	±%
PTI	Amirullah Marwat	63,922	52.03	+40.57
JUI-F	Atta-ur-Rehman	56,948	46.35	−6.60
PkMAP	Doctor Abdullah Khan	450	0.36	+0.28
Independent	Engineer Amir Nawaz	437	0.36	
Independent	Naseer Ali	290	0.24	
Independent	Nawab Ali Khan	289	0.23	
Independent	Asmatullah	275	0.23	
Independent	Muhammad Halim	64	0.05	
Independent	Hazrat Ali	56	0.04	
Independent	Ali Sarwar	38	0.03	
Independent	Muhammad Raees Khan	38	0.03	
MDM	Molana Hidayat Ullah Khan Chishti	30	0.02	
Independent	Haji Muhammad Akram Khan	10	0.01	
Independent	Quadrat Ullah Khan	10	0.01	
Independent	Professor Zarwali Khan	3	0.01	
Independent	Akhtar Munir Khan	0	0.00	
Majority		6,974	5.68	
Turnout		122,860	37.13	−16.13
PTI gain from JUI (F)				

=== 2018 general election ===
General elections were held on 25 July 2018.

General election 2018: NA-36 Lakki Marwat
Party	Candidate	Votes	%	±%
MMA	Mohammad Anwar Khan	91,065	45.15	+1.2✞
PTI	Ashfaq Ahmed Khan	81,849	40.58	+.01
Others	Others (fifteen candidates)	28,693	14.23	
Independent	Sher Afzal Marwat	92	.05	
Turnout		210,866	50.06	+12.93
Total valid votes		201,699	95.65	
Rejected ballots		9,167	4.35	
Majority		9,216	4.57	−1.11
Registered electors		421,224		
MMA gain from PTI				

✞Showing change from JUI-F in 2013 to MMA in 2018, of which JUI-F was a component.

=== 2024 general election ===
General elections were held on 8 February 2024.

General election 2024: NA-41 Lakki Marwat
Party	Candidate	Votes	%	±%
PTI	Sher Afzal Marwat	117,988	48.76	+8.17✞
JUI (F)	Asjad Mehmood	68,303	28.23	−16.92✞✞
PML(N)	Salim Saifullah Khan	46,070	19.04	
Others	Others (thirty six candidates)	9,608	3.97	
Turnout		249,057	48.10	−1.96
Total valid votes		241,969	97.15	+1.5
Rejected ballots		7,088	2.85	-1.5
Majority		49,685	20.53	
Registered electors		516,745		
PTI gain from PML(N)				

✞Showing change from PTI in 2018 to Sher Afzal Marwat in 2024 who was backed by PTI
✞✞Showing change from MMA in 2018, of which JUI-F was part, to JUI-F in 2024

== See also ==
- NA-40 North Waziristan
- NA-42 South Waziristan Upper-cum-South Waziristan Lower
