= Amirullah Marwat =

Member of the National Assembly of Pakistan
- In office 26 September 2013 – 31 May 2018
- Constituency: NA-27 (Lakki Marwat)

Amirullah Marwat (Urdu: امیر اللہ مروت) is a Pakistani politician and former army officer who served as a member of the National Assembly of Pakistan, from September 2013 to May 2018.

He is a retired colonel of Pakistani Army.

== Political career ==
Marwat was elected to the National Assembly of Pakistan as a candidate of Pakistan Tehreek-e-Insaf from Constituency NA-27 (Lakki Marwat) in by-elections held following the 2013 Pakistani general election. The seat was earlier won by Maulana Fazal-ur-Rehman in the 2013 general elections and later vacated in order to retain the seat won in his home constituency NA-24 (D.I.Khan). Marwat remained chairman of the National Assembly Standing Committee on Federal Education and Professional Training during his tenure as MNA. Marwat was chosen as the chairman of the National Commission for Human Development in January 2019.
