= 2022 Lakki Marwat attack =

November 2022 terrorist attack

- Location: Lakki Marwat, Khyber Pakhtunkhwa, Pakistan
- Date: 16 November 2022
- Attack type: Shooting
- Weapon: Firearms
- Deaths: 6
- Perpetrator: Two motorcycle-riding terrorists
- No. of participants: 2
- Motive: Terrorism
- Tehrik-i-Taliban Pakistan claimed responsibility for the attack.

On 16 November 2022, an attack claims the lives of six police officers, including ASI (Assistant Sub-Inspector) in Lakki Marwat, Khyber Pakhtunkhwa, Pakistan.

At least six police officers, including an Assistant Sub-Inspector (ASI), died when two motorcycle-riding terrorists opened fire on their patrol vehicle. banned terrorist organization Tehrik-i-Taliban Pakistan (TTP) accepted the responsibility of attack.

== Reactions ==
- President Arif Alvi, who strongly condemned the terrorist assault. He said The nation's will to combat the threat of terrorism cannot be weakened by such heinous deeds
- Prime minister, Shehbaz Sharif fiercely denounced the terrorist incident, and said that all measures will be done to protect the nation from its adversaries.
- Foreign Minister Bilawal Bhutto Zardari and Interior Minister Rana Sanaullah both strongly denounced the terrorist incident.

== See also ==
- 2010 Lakki Marwat suicide bombing
- 2023 Lakki Marwat terrorist attack
