= 2023 Lakki Marwat terrorist attack =

Terrorist attack

- Location: Lakki Marwat, Khyber Pakhtunkhwa, Pakistan
- Date: 29 March 2023
- Target: Saddar Police Station
- Attack type: Militant attack
- Weapons: Improvised explosive device, firearms
- Deaths: 4 policemen
- Injuries: 6 policemen
- Perpetrator: Tehreek-i-Taliban Pakistan (TTP)

On 29 March 2023, a terrorist attack occurred on the Saddar Police Station in Lakki Marwat, a city in Khyber Pakhtunkhwa, Pakistan. The attack resulted in the killing of four policemen, including Deputy Superintendent (DSP) Iqbal Mohmand, and injuring six other cops. The attack was carried out by militants who fled the scene after the attack, and a search operation was launched to apprehend them.

== Background ==
The DSP and his team were on their way to assist the embattled cops at the police station when their car was hit by an improvised explosive device (IED) near Pirwala Morr. Apart from the DSP, three other policemen, Karamat, Waqar, and Ali Marjan, were also martyred in the blast. Meanwhile, six other cops were injured during the attack at the police station and were taken to Lakki City Hospital.

The funeral prayers for the martyred policemen were offered at the Police Lines in Lakki Marwat and were attended by senior police officials and community leaders.

== Responsibility ==
The outlawed Tehreek-i-Taliban Pakistan (TTP) claimed responsibility for the attack, which was part of a surge in terrorism in Pakistan.

== Reactions ==
Prime Minister Shehbaz Sharif condemned the attack and expressed profound grief and sorrow over the martyrdom of the police personnel. He extended condolences to the bereaved families and prayed for the speedy recovery of the injured.

== See also ==
- 2010 Lakki Marwat suicide bombing
- 2022 Lakki Marwat attack
