= PK-105 Lakki Marwat-I =

Pakistani electoral district

- Constituency for the Khyber Pakhtunkhwa Assembly
- Region: Lakki Marwat city, Lakki Marwat Tehsil of Lakki Marwat District

Current constituency
- Party: Muttahida Majlis-e-Amal
- Member(s): Anwar Hayat Khan
- Created from: PK-76 Lakki Marwat-III (2002-2018); PK-91 Lakki Marwat-I (2018-2023)

PK-105 Lakki Marwat-I (پی کے-105، لکی مروت-1) is a constituency for the Khyber Pakhtunkhwa Assembly of the Khyber Pakhtunkhwa province of Pakistan.

== 2018 election ==
Provincial election 2018: PK-91 Lakki Marwat-I
Party	Candidate	Votes	%	±%
MMA	Munawar Khan	25,242		
PTI	Johar Muhammad	21,798		
Independent	Najeebullah Khan	16,078		
Others	Others (thirteen candidates)	10,323		
Independent	Sher Afzal Marwat	33		
Turnout				
Total valid votes				
Rejected ballots				
Majority				
Registered electors				
MMA gain from				

== See also ==
- PK-104 North Waziristan-II
- PK-106 Lakki Marwat-II
