= Muhammad Khattak =

Muhammad Khattak may refer to:

- Muhammad Aslam Khan Khattak (1908–2008), Pakistani politician and diplomat
- Muhammad Khattak, a Canadian gang member involved in Toronto Mayor Rob Ford's smoking crack cocaine affair
