= Johar Muhammad =

Pakistani politician

Member of the Provincial Assembly of Khyber Pakhtunkhwa
- Incumbent
- Assumed office February 2024
- Constituency: PK-105 Lakki Marwat-I

Personal details
- Born: Lakki Marwat District, Khyber Pakhtunkhwa, Pakistan
- Party: PTI (2018-present)

Johar Muhammad is a Pakistani politician from Lakki Marwat District who has been a member of the Provincial Assembly of Khyber Pakhtunkhwa since February 2024.

== Career ==
He contested the 2024 general elections as a Pakistan Tehreek-e-Insaf/Independent candidate from PK-105 Lakki Marwat-I and secured 36,757 votes. The runner-up was Munawar Khan of JUI-F who secured 26,122 votes.
