= Pakistan Peoples Muslim League =

- Abbreviation: PPML
- Leader: Arbab Ghulam Rahim
- Founded: 2009
- Dissolved: May 2013
- Split from: PML (Q)
- Merged into: PML (N)
- Ideology: Conservatism (Pakistani); Liberal conservatism

The Pakistan Peoples Muslim League (PPML), formerly known as the Pakistan Muslim League (Like-Minded) and abbreviated as PML (LM), was a political party in Pakistan led by former Chief Minister of Sindh Arbab Ghulam Rahim. The party was a breakaway faction of the Pakistan Muslim League (Q). It emerged in 2009 after many members of the Pakistan Muslim League (Q) became disillusioned by the questionable decisions of the Chaudhrys of Gujrat who were alleged to be making important decisions without consulting any of the senior party members and making the party an undemocratic "family party." In May 2013, the PPML merged with the Pakistan Muslim League (N).

Many PML (Q) heavyweights including Arbab Ghulam Rahim, Hamid Nasir Chattha, Khurshid Mahmud Kasuri, Humayun Akhtar Khan, Haroon Akhtar Khan, Salim Saifullah Khan, Humayun Saifullah Khan, Gohar Ayub Khan, Omar Ayub Khan, Kashmala Tariq, Mian Atta Muhammad Manika and many other like-minded politicians got together to form what they believed was the legitimate version of the PML (Q).

This created a huge vacuum in the original PML (Q) and in 2011, more than half of its members in the Punjab Assembly decided to ditch their original party and join hands with the PML (N) to support Chief Minister Shahbaz Sharif when the Pakistan Peoples Party was kicked out of the Punjab Government. In 2010, the PPML faction began its effort to unite factions of the Muslim League under one umbrella and managed to create an electoral alliance known as the Muttahida Muslim League which included Sheikh Rasheed Ahmed of Awami Muslim League, Makhdoom Syed Ahmad Mehmood of Pakistan Muslim League (Functional), and Ijaz-ul-Haq of Pakistan Muslim League (Zia).

In May 2012, the Likeminded Group officially entered into an electoral alliance with Pakistan Muslim League (N) in a bid to unite all Muslim League factions and defeat opposing parties such as PTI and the ruling coalition of PPP and PML (Q).

In March 2013, Pakistan Muslim League (Like-Minded) was renamed as Pakistan Peoples Muslim League; however, it eceased to exist when it merged with Pakistan Muslim League (N) in May 2013.
