= Saifullah Khan =

Pakistani politician

Saifullah Khan (1 January 1916 – 4 April 1964) was a Pakistani industrialist and politician who served as a member of the National Assembly of Pakistan from 1962 to until his death in 1964. He was the founder of Saif Group.

== Biography ==
Born in Mohabbat Khan Kot Ghazni Khel, Lakki Marwat District, Khan relocated to Dera Ismail Khan following the death of his mother. He completed his early education there before attending Government College Lahore, graduating in 1936. He then pursued higher education at the Middle Temple in the UK, becoming a barrister.

Returning to India in 1939, he began his political career in Dera Ismail Khan. He later moved to Peshawar, marrying Kulsoom Bibi, daughter of Bahadur Quli Khan.

Khan started his legal practice with Khan Abdul Qayyum Khan, and later founded his own business, Saif Group, after acquiring a state-owned factory. He was also involved in the Pakistan Movement and was imprisoned for a brief period of three months in Bannu.
