= Terrorist incidents in Pakistan in 2010 =

This article is about terrorist incidents in Pakistan in 2010 in chronological order.

== January – March ==
- 1 January:- At least 130+ people were killed and 253 injured when a suicide bomber blew up his vehicle in a crowd watching a volleyball game in Lakki Marwat, Khyber-Pakhtunkhwa.
- 3 January:- In the north-western Pakistani town of Hangu, a former provincial minister and two other people were killed in a roadside bomb attack, police have said. The blast reportedly killed Ghani-ur Rehman, his driver and his bodyguard. The minister was reported as being a former Khyber-Pakhtunkhwa education minister, for the area.
- 6 January:- In Pakistani-administered Kashmir, at least three soldiers were killed and another 11 injured after a bomb attack occurred outside an army barracks, police say. No group has claimed responsibility.
- 8 January:- In Karachi unknown gunmen went on the rampage, killing at least 7 people within the area, police say. The gunmen were apparently targeting ethnic Balochis in parts of the city. The armed men were reportedly riding motorcycles as they were carrying out their attack on the civilians.
- 9 January:- A suicide bomber detonated himself and wounded seven policemen in the village of Adezai, Peshawar, Khyber-Pakhtunkhwa.
- 11 January:- Five bullet-riddled bodies were found in the Pakistani city of Karachi, police say. This attack appeared to be part of a renewed war among rival political factions, officials claimed. Since the start of the year, when a dead political activist was discovered, at least 31 people are known to have been murdered in killings. Political violence had reportedly intensified in the city of Karachi.
- 16 January:- At least two soldiers have been injured after a suicide bomber attacked a military convoy in Pakistani-controlled Kashmir, police say.
- 20 January:- A politician and member of the Awami National Party, Aurangzeb Khan, was seriously injured after a bomb blast occurred in Peshawar. Three others are also known to have been injured, police say.
- 23 January:- A suicide bomber killed five people including children outside a police station in Gumal, Tank District. 32°06′57″N 070°09′29″E
- 30 January:- A suspected suicide bomber killed at least 16 people and wounded 20 others when he attacked a checkpoint in the North-Western Pakistani town of Khar.
- 1 February:- In Karachi, ethnic and political clashes resulted in the target killings of least 26 people. These latest clashes come as dozens more have been killed in similar attacks over the past few weeks, across the city.
- 3 February:- At least 10 people were killed, including three US soldiers, when a bomb blast hit a convoy near a school in the north-west region of Pakistan. Three schoolgirls were also among the dead and it is believed that this blast injured up to another 70 people within the area.
- 5 February:- KARACHI: At least 13 dead and 50 injured from blast in a mini bus near Nursery Road. The injured were taken to government Jinnah hospital. After 2 hours the second planted bomb blasted at motorcycle stand emergency gate of government Jinnah hospital, killing 10 and injuring dozens, including rescuers. Relatives of the first blast victims were present in the Emergency Ward. Later a 3rd bomb was found in a TV set in the hospital.
- 9 February:- A senior Pakistani politician was attacked by militants in the city of Rawalpindi, in the Punjab province. The politician, Sheikh Rashid Ahmed, survived this attack however 3 of his security guards were killed, police have said.
- 10 February:- At least 15 security personnel, a brigadier and a pilot among them, and seven civilians lost their lives in a gun attack, a suicide bombing and a helicopter crash in Khyber Agency in the northwestern province. The brigadier was killed and two other officers, a major and a lieutenant, were injured when Taliban insurgents ambushed an army rescue party searching for bodies of the pilot and a gunner of a helicopter gunship which had crashed in the Tirah valley.
- 11 February:- Two bomb explosions occurred in north-western Pakistan, near a police compound. In these bombings it has been reported that at least 12 people were killed and another 20 were injured. Unconfirmed reports have claimed that these bombings were caused by suicide bombers.
- 18 February:- A bomb attack in a crowded market selling hashish, in north western Pakistan, resulted in the deaths of at least 15 people and wounded more than 100 others. The blast occurred in the Kyber tribal region of Pakistan, in an area where the Taliban are known to have a strong presence. The bomb reportedly detonated near a mosque in the Tirah valley of the Kyber region, officials have said.
- 22 February:- Two Sikh men were kidnapped by unknown gunmen in the tribal regions of north-west Pakistan. They were later beheaded by their kidnappers, their bodies were later found in the Khyber and Orakzai areas, officials claim. At least 5 people were killed and many others injured, after a bomb attack occurred in Mingora, the main city in the Swat region of north-west Pakistan. The target for this attack appears to have been an army convoy and it has been confirmed that two of those killed were soldiers.
- 24 February:- Four civilians were killed in the north-western Pakistani city of Peshawar, after Taliban militants fired a rocket into a residential area. Witnesses claim that a two-storey house was also destroyed in this attack. Officials are now claiming that this explosion was caused by a gas leak however local residents insist that rockets were used against them and that these devices caused the explosion.
- 27 February:- A suicide bomber targeted a police station in Khyber-Pakhtunkhwa province of Pakistan. The attack killed at least three police officers and 13 other people were wounded as a result of this explosion. The blast also damaged a nearby mosque as well as part of the police station. It has been reported that many more people could be trapped under the debris caused by this blast. No group has claimed responsibility for the bombing.
- 5 March:- In the Hangu district of north-west Pakistan, a suicide bomber targeted a convoy of vehicles travelling from the Hangu district to the Kurram region. The bomber allegedly detonated next to a bus full of passengers. In this bombing it has been reported that at least 12 people were killed and that another 25 were injured. No-one has yet said that they carried out this attack.
- 8 March:- A suicide bomb attack killed at least 13 people in Lahore and wounded more than 60 others. The bomber reportedly rammed his explosive-laden vehicle into a building that housed an anti-terrorist wing of the federal investigative agency. The explosion was so large it allegedly brought down the two-storey building, correspondents have said. A nearby religious school was also known to have been damaged in this bombing and passer- by, including children are believed to be among the dead and the injured.
- 10 March:- Unidentified gunmen attacked the office of a Western aid agency, in the Mansehra district of Pakistan, which is only 40 miles (64 km) north of the capital Islamabad. It is known that 6 people were killed in this assault and it has been reported that there was an explosion as well as firing inside the building when the militants stormed into the agency. One aid worker claimed that the gunmen engaged in a battle with police inside the building. The agency also claimed that seven members of staff had been injured in this attack.
- 11 March:- A suicide bomber's explosive vest detonated prematurely, as he was trying to target a convoy of security forces, along the boundary between Peshawar and the Khyber tribal region. In the explosion it is known that 5 people were killed and that a dozen others were injured. Some of the injured are reportedly in a critical condition, officials have claimed.
- 12 March:- Two suicide bomb attacks in the Pakistani city of Lahore resulted in the deaths of at least 45 people and wounded 100 others. Both of these bomb attacks reportedly targeted military vehicles, as they were passing through a crowded area. The blasts occurred within 15–20 seconds of each other. It is known that at least 9 soldiers were killed in these two suicide bombings. These two blasts occurred very close to the RA bazaar, which is in a busy residential and shopping area where the army and security agencies have facilities. Later on however several other smaller blasts occurred across the city. These smaller blasts were reportedly designed to cause confusion and there were no reports of any serious injuries due to their effects. No group has yet said that it had carried out the bombings although the Pakistani Taliban are strong suspects.
- 13 March:- A suicide bomber targeted a rickshaw near to a security checkpoint. The bombing occurred near the city of Mingora, which is the main city in the Swat Valley. In this bombing it is known that at least 10 people were killed and that another 37 were wounded. The bomber was reportedly trying to enter a government facility used by the police and security forces however he blew himself up after being stopped by the police. This attack follows threats by the Taliban militants, as they intend to deploy thousands of suicide bombers in retaliation for an army offensive.
- 16 March:- A blast occurred near Chandni Chowk in Garden area of Karachi on Tuesday, killing one woman and injuring three others, including children.
- 17 March:- Militants attacked a security checkpoint in North-west Pakistan, on the southern outskirts of the city Peshawar. In this rocket and gun attack it is known that five security personnel were killed. More than a dozen militants were reportedly involved in this assault which apparently occurred upon Peshawar's border with the Khyber district, within the country. No group has claimed responsibility for the attack.
- 18 March:- Loud blast heard near Lahore airport. A loud blast is reported to have been heard near Allama Iqbal International airport, Geo News reported. Chaotic activity was witnessed at the airport immediately after the blast, creating panic in the surrounding area sources said.
- 21 March:- At least 3 people were killed and another 14 were wounded after a bicycle bomb exploded in Quetta, the capital town of Balochistan. The bomb reportedly detonated just as a police vehicle was passing nearby and it is known that at least two police personnel were among the dead. The blast was so powerful that it apparently rattled several nearby buildings, shops and vehicles.
- 22 March:- A roadside bomb killed one person and injured three others, in the city of Quetta, located in southwestern Pakistan. The bomb was reportedly planted beside a rickshaw near a busy intersection, a senior police officer has said.
- 26 March:- At least 5 Pakistani soldiers were killed in a clash with Taliban militants and foreign fighters in the Orakzai tribal district of the country.
- 28 March:- A bomb planted near a music shop exploded in a bazaar and wounded five people, as well as destroying the shop in the city of Peshawar, Pakistan. It is known that two nearby grocery shops were also damaged in this blast. No group has claimed responsibility although Taliban militants are suspected to be behind this bombing.
- 31 March:- Militants stormed into a Pakistan army camp in the Khyber region after a car bomb explosion blew a hole in one of the walls to the compound. In this attack it has been reported that at least 6 Pakistani soldiers were killed and that another 15 were injured. The Pakistan army reported that 25 militants were also killed in this attack however this claim cannot be independently verified.

== April – June ==
- 5 April – At least 43 people were killed and more than 50 others were wounded after a suicide bomber attacked a political party rally in the Lower Dir district of north-western Pakistan. The bomber had reportedly detonated his explosives near to the stage of this outdoor rally, as hundreds of people were attending the event. The Lower Dir district was the scene of a major offensive against the Taliban by the Pakistani Army last year. In the city of Peshawar in north-western Pakistan, unknown militants attacked the U.S. consulate. It has been reported that at least seven people were killed in this attack; the number of injuries however has not been specified yet. The dead included four militants and 3 security personnel. It has also been reported that several explosions occurred in the area and that some buildings collapsed as a result of these blasts. Shortly after these explosions a gun battle followed between the militants and the police forces at the scene of these attacks. Officials have claimed that the attack was well organised but say order has now been restored to the area. The Pakistani Taliban later claimed responsibility for this attack and admitted that the U.S. consulate was the target for this attack.
- 7 April – One person was killed after a bomb attached to a tanker carrying fuel to NATO forces in Afghanistan detonated in the Khyber tribal region of Pakistan. The victim was reportedly riding in the van from behind and it is known that four other people were also wounded in this attack. In a separate incident with the capital city of Islamabad, an explosion occurred within the parking lot of a market place. The explosion caused minor damage in the area however no casualties were reported due to the effects of this blast.
- 8 April – Militants attacked and bombed three girls' schools, which were located on the outskirts of the Pakistani city of Peshawar. Nobody was killed or injured in these bombings but damage was inflicted upon the schools. The Pakistani Taliban have been blamed for these recent attacks and the education minister has accused them of trying to spread panic across the country. The militants had reportedly planted the explosive materials near to the schools before detonating them later on.
- 13 April – A bomb exploded in the Pakistani capital of Islamabad. The bomb was reportedly planted inside a dustbin and it is believed to have been only a low-intensity explosion. No casualties have been reported yet and security personnel have apparently cordoned off the area where this particular explosion had occurred.
- 16 April – At least ten people were killed and another 35 were injured after a suicide bomb attack took place at a hospital, in the Pakistani city of Quetta. Reports are claiming that a TV cameraman, as well as two police officers, were among the dead for this particular attack. It is believed that the suicide bomber walked into the hospital and detonated his explosives at the entrance to the emergency room. Soon after this bombing it has been reported that gunfire was heard from surrounding rooftops and side-streets located nearby to this bombing. The authorities believe that the Taliban, as well as some Al-Qaeda leaders, have set up a de facto headquarters in this city, known as the Quetta Shura.
- 17 April – At least 41 people were killed and more than 60 others were injured after two suicide bombers attacked the Kacha Pukha camp, near to the Pakistani city of Kohat. The first suicide bomber had reportedly detonated his explosives after walking into a gathering of people, as they were receiving relief aid from the authorities. The second suicide bomber then struck, in the middle of a gathering crowd only a few minutes after the first blast. It is also known that both of these bombers were wearing burqas, as they were carrying out each of their suicide attacks on this refugee camp.
- 18 April – A suicide bomber detonated his explosive-laden vehicle near to a police station in the north-western Pakistani city of Kohat. In this attack, it is known that 7 people were killed and that 21 others were reportedly injured. It is known that the bomber had detonated up to 200kg of explosives on the back side of the police station, which he was targeting. This latest attack, along with others in the past few days, appears to be a reaction towards the military operations that are being conducted by the Pakistani army, in the tribal areas of the country.
- 19 April – At least 23 people were killed and more than 40 others were wounded after two bomb attacks hit the Pakistani city of Peshawar. The first attack occurred when a bomb exploded outside a school run by a police welfare foundation, killing 1 person and injuring 10 others. The second attack involved a suicide bomber who had targeted a political rally near a crowded market area. In this specific attack it is also known that at least 22 people were killed and more than 30 others were reportedly wounded. It has been reported that police officers and political protesters were among those who had been killed in this blast. In a separate incident within the Khyber region of the country, suspected Taliban militants attacked a pair of NATO oil tankers detonating two bombs near them. Nobody was reportedly killed or wounded in this attack but a fire engulfed a flatbed truck and nearby shops that were located within the local area.
- 22 April – Unidentified gunmen attacked and killed a former member of parliament, 'Mr Omarzai' while he was driving his car in the Charsadda district of Khyber-Pakhtunkhwa province. It has been reported that 3 other people were also killed in this attack after militants sprayed their vehicle with bullets, as the politician was leaving his office, a local police official has claimed. The politician, 'Mr Omarzai' reportedly died at the scene of this attack whereas his other 3 companions died later on in hospital due to the wounds that they had sustained in this attack.
- 23 April – Taliban militants ambushed a Pakistan Army convoy, as they were carrying out a routine movement in the Pakistani tribal region of North Waziristan. In this ambush, it is known that at least 7 soldiers were killed and that at least another 16 had been injured. It has been reported by officials that the militants attacked the convoy in the Dattakhel area of North Waziristan. In a separate incident, Taliban militants killed 4 people within the same region after they accused them of spying for the U.S. This area is part of the lawlesstribal region, which borders Afghanistan and officials claim that the area is a stronghold for the Pakistani Taliban and Al-Qaeda.
- 24 April – A suicide bomber detonated his explosive-laden car near a police van. However it has been reported that no policemen were in the van at the time of this attack so no fatalities were sustained. The attack occurred within the town of Timergara in the Lower Dir district of north-west Pakistan. It is known that 10 policemen were injured in this particular bombing and it has also been reported that two of these police personnel were seriously wounded, as a result of this suicide blast.
- 25 April – A bomb exploded at a confectionery shop, within the Pakistani city of Quetta. In this bombing, it is known that around 11 people had been injured, five of these people were reported to have been very seriously wounded in this blast. It is also known that this bomb had been placed behind the refrigerator within the confectionery shop, as it had detonated in the store.
- 27 April – In Quetta, a woman teacher was killed, in a drive-by shooting within Baluchistan, police have said. This latest attack is part of an ongoing spate of killings within the southwestern province where separatist militants have reportedly waged a low-level insurgency there, for many decades.
- 28 April – A suicide car bomber rammed his explosive-laden vehicle into a police vehicle at a checkpoint, in the north-western Pakistani city of Peshawar. In this bombing, it is known that 4 people were killed and at least another 10 had been injured. No group has yet claimed responsibility for this particular attack but the Taliban are strong suspects, considering that they have carried out dozens of recent bombings across the country.
- 30 April – A Pakistani human rights activist, Khalid Khawaja, was kidnapped and killed by unidentified militants. His body was reportedly discovered in a ditch near the town of Mir Ali within the tribal areas of North Waziristan, according to officials in the area. It is known that a note was apparently attached to his body claiming that this man who was a former Pakistani intelligence officer is now an agent working for the United States. The militants have threatened that the same fate will await those who try to spy for America, in the same way that he had supposedly done so for them.
- 1 May – A remote-control bomb attack wounded six police personnel on the Qambrani road within the Pakistani city of Quetta. It is known that the police officers were on a routine patrol on the Qambrani road when the blast occurred. It has also been reported that 2 of those who were injured in this particular explosion are now believed to be in a critical condition.
- 7 May – Suspected militants killed 4 policemen and injured one other policeman, after they stormed into a police checkpost in a pre-dawn attack, within the north-western Pakistani town of Mansehra.
- 10 May – At least 9 Pakistani soldiers were killed in clashes with hundreds of Taliban militants within Pakistan's north-western tribal region of Orakzai, according to army officials within the local area.
- 12 May – A grenade attack within the north-western Pakistani city of Peshawar killed 2 people and injured 2 others. No group has yet claimed responsibility for this attack although Taliban militants are suspected.
- 13 May – A roadside bomb detonated near a police checkpoint in the outskirts of the north-western Pakistani city of Peshawar. In this roadside bombing, it is known that 3 people were killed and that 2 others had been injured in the particular blast. A car bomb explosion occurred within the Pakistani city of Chitral. In this bombing it is known that 3 people were badly injured and were then later hospitalised for their injuries.
- 18 May – At least 12 people were killed and 15 others were injured after a bike bomb exploded near a police station within the Pakistani town of Dera Ismail Khan, in north-western Pakistan. This bombing was reportedly targeting the town's deputy police superintendent, who was apparently killed in this blast along with his guard and their driver. The dead also apparently included some women and children, according to hospital officials within the local area. It is also known that this bicycle bomb was detonated by remote control and local police in the area have confirmed this claim. Nobody has yet claimed responsibility although Taliban militants are the most likely of perpetrators.
- 20 May – Sectarian clashes between rival ethnic groups resulted in the deaths of up to 23 people in the Pakistani port city of Karachi.
- 21 May – Two men were killed by Taliban militants after they strapped explosives to the two men, whom they had accused of spying for the U.S. These two men were reportedly killed by the militants at a public execution within North Waziristan, in the volatile north-west of the country.
- 25 May – A bomb blast occurred near the office of the National Highway Authority on the main airport road, in the city of Quetta. In this bombing it is known that two people were killed and that 16 others were reportedly injured. It has been reported that the bomb itself was planted inside a rickshaw and that this blast had apparently damaged the power transmission lines within the local area and had plunged the surrounding areas into darkness. The injured people were later rushed to the civil hospital due to the injuries that they had sustained in this blast. In another incident within the city of Quetta, unknown militants attacked an office using explosives. In this particular attack however, only 2 people were injured.
- 28 May – Two Ahmadi mosques in Lahore were attacked by an unknown group. The two attacks were carried out nearly simultaneously, at Garhi Shahu and Lahore Model Town, 15km apart. More than 95 people were killed and 108 others were injured. One attacker was killed; another suicide bomber was captured by worshipers. In the Pakistani city of Quetta within south-western Pakistan, it is known that four police officers were killed after they were attacked by militants brandishing weapons, whilst riding on a motorcycle. In this attack, it is known that the head of the police station, along with two of his constables and a driver were killed. The head of the police station was apparently driving from to the police station from his home, as he was attacked by these armed militants.
- 30 May – Militants ambushed a van within the tribal region of Kurram near the Afghan-Pakistan border. In this attack, it is known that two people were killed and that 4 other people were injured, as a result of this militant ambush upon their vehicle according to a paramilitary official within the area.
- 31 May – At least 8 people were killed and up to 40 others were reportedly injured after at least three armed militants stormed into a hospital within the eastern Pakistani city of Lahore. It has been reported that the militants stormed into the building and opened fire indiscriminately upon hospital guards and attendants. The attackers apparently managed to flee from the scene of this attack, after seizing hostages briefly inside the hospital complex. Some reports have even claimed that the militants were dressed in police uniform as they carried out this attack and there has been speculation that the militants had intended to reach a captured militant who had been detained by the authorities in the Ahmadi mosque attacks only three days before this assault.
- 3 June – Two low intensity bomb explosions occurred within the eastern Pakistani city of Lahore. In these two explosions it has been reported that around 5 people were injured, as a result of the two blasts. A stampede reportedly ensued after these blasts due to the large numbers of people present at the Urs in Duri Buri Darbaar. The injured were later transported to Mayo Hospital.
- 8 June – At a football ground in Miranshah, North Waziristan within the tribal zones of north-western Pakistan, the Taliban killed one person in a public execution, which was witnessed by up to 700 people. It was later reported that masked militants had blindfolded and bound the man, before shooting him dead at a football ground within the main town of Miranshah, in the volatile region of North-Waziristan within Pakistan's tribal areas.
- 9 June – At least 7 people were killed and 4 others were reportedly injured after Taliban militants attacked and destroyed a NATO convoy near to Pakistan's capital city of Islamabad. It was later reported that up to 20 vehicles had been destroyed and set on fire by up to a dozen suspected militants who had stormed into the depot and started firing their weapons indiscriminately killing mostly drivers of the trucks, as well as their assistants. These NATO trucks were reportedly carrying supplies to alliance troops in Afghanistan who are currently engaged in fighting against the Taliban and it is known that the local police are currently searching for these suspected militants after they escaped in two cars, as well as on motorbikes to a nearby forest area, which is close by to where this assault had taken place on the NATO convoy.
- 10 June – In Karachi, a bomb planted on a motorbike exploded, killing 1 person and wounding 2 others. It was later reported that the two people injured in this blast had been police officials, according to the city's police chief. In the Khuzdar district within the south-western Baluchistan Province, unidentified militants opened fire on a group of paramilitary troops. In this attack it has been reported that 1 soldier had been killed while 2 others had been injured in this assault, according to security officials in the local area.
- 12 June – Sectarian and political violence within the southern Pakistani city of Karachi resulted in the deaths of up to 5 people, local police officials have claimed.
- 14 June – At least 7 paramilitary soldiers were killed and more than 10 others were captured by militants after they attacked a security checkpoint in the tribal region of Mohmand near the Afghan-Pakistan border. Paramilitary officials later confirmed this overnight attack however they refused to give details concerning the casualties unlike the Taliban spokesman who had given details surrounding this particular attack.
- 18 June – Two people were killed in sectarian violence within the Pakistani city of Karachi. It was later reported that these two people included both a doctor, as well as a soldier and that these two men appeared to have targeted because they were Shia Muslims.
- 19 June – At least 1 person was killed and 8 others were injured after a roadside bomb exploded near to a police vehicle in north-western Pakistan. It was later reported by a Pakistani police official that this blast had occurred within the town of Dera Ismail Khan, in the north-west of the country, as a police patrol vehicle was patrolling this town.
- 21 June – At least 3 Pakistani army soldiers were killed and another 5 soldiers were injured, as a result of a militant ambush within the village of Kasha, in the Orakzai Agency tribal district of north-western Pakistan. The ambush apparently sparked pitched battles between the Pakistani army and Taliban militants within the local area.
- 25 June – At least 2 Pakistani army soldiers were killed and 9 other soldiers were wounded, as a result of three roadside bombing incidents within the Khyber and South Waziristan agencies, which are both located within the restive north-western sectors of Pakistan. Security forces have reportedly cordoned off the areas of these attacks and shifted the injured security personnel to local hospitals within the area.
- 26 June – A series of consecutive bomb explosions occurred within the Pakistani city of Lahore near a business district within the city. These bomb explosions were later described as only being low-intensity explosions and only 7 people were injured with no reports of any deaths within this crowded area of the city.
- 28 June – At least 18 people were killed and over 40 others were injured after a bomb-laden truck detonated within the Pakistani city of Hyderabad, which is located north of Pakistan's southern financial capital of Karachi. It was not immediately known whether this bomb explosion was an act of terrorism and no specific group has yet claimed responsibility for this latest attack. At least 5 people were killed and 8 others were critically injured in a series of killings across the southern Pakistani city of Karachi. At least 4 Pakistani soldiers were killed when Taliban militants ambushed their army patrol in the tribal district of Bajaur near to the Afghan border.
- 30 June – At least two policemen were killed in the Mastung district of Pakistan's southwestern province of Baluchistan, after unidentified militants opened fire at a vehicle carrying security forces. Security forces later cordoned off the area and even started a search operation within the area after this attack. In a separate incident, it was reported that one man was injured in a bomb explosion at the Fatima Jinnah Road in the Pakistani city of Quetta.

== July – September ==
- 1 July:- At least 2 people were killed and 3 others were wounded in a bomb explosion within Pakistan's south-western Balochistan Province, according to local police officials in the area.
- 1 July:- At least 42 people were killed and more than 180 others were wounded after two suicide bombers attacked a Sufi Islamic shrine at the Data Durbar Complex within the eastern Pakistani city of Lahore. It was reported that the first suicide bomber struck in the underground section of the complex, where visitors sleep and prepare themselves for prayer, according to local officials. The second suicide bomber reportedly then struck in the upstairs area of the complex, as people fled from the initial suicide explosion. It is known that the impact of these two suicide blasts ripped open the courtyard of the shrine, therefore rescuers at the scene had to shift and clamber throughout the rubble, as they attempted to carry out the victims who were affected in these attacks. Both the suicide bombers are known to have used explosive devices packed with ball-bearings, in order to maximise the impact of their suicide attacks. This particular attack was later proclaimed the biggest of attacks as yet, to target a Sufi shrine since militant attacks began in the country in the year of 2001. This particular shrine holds the remains of a Persian Sufi saint and is often visited by hundreds of thousands of people each year from both the Sunni and Shia traditions of Islam.
- 3 July:- At least 11 people were killed, including four soldiers, in separate terrorist-related incidents across the country, as Pakistan continues to struggle with ongoing violence. It was reported that a remote-controlled bomb blast struck a Pakistani security force convoy, near to Malik Din Khel within Pakistan's northwestern Khyber tribal region, killing 4 soldiers and wounding another 4 others in the process. Security forces later cordoned off the area to this bomb blast and shifted the injured soldiers to hospitals within the Pakistani city of Peshawar. In the northwestern parts of the country, in a separate incident, an armed militant ambush killed 2 people and left 1 other injured. Meanwhile, unknown militants killed at least 5 people in killings within the southern Pakistani port city of Karachi.
- 4 July:- At least 4 people were killed in two separate terrorist-related incidents in the Shabaqadar and Kohat areas of north-western Pakistan. The dead also reportedly included two security men who had been killed along with one civilian in a shooting incident after unknown militants opened fire at security forces within a market, in the Shabaqadar area which is adjacent to the Mohmand agency. In a separate incident, one person was killed and another person was injured, as a result of a remote-controlled bomb explosion within the Javeki area in the town of Kohat.
- 5 July:- At least 1 Pakistani soldier was killed and 13 other people, including twelve soldiers were injured after a suicide car bomber opened fire at guards and then proceeded to detonate his explosives at the gate of a paramilitary base. It was later reported that this attack took place within the town of Timargarah, in the Lower Dir district of north-western Pakistan, which is located near to the Afghan border.
- 8 July:- At least 1 person was killed and 6 others were injured after two separate terrorist-related incidents occurred within the Khyber Agency, in north-western Pakistan. In one of the incidents, it was reported that a mortar shell had hit a house in the Malik Din Khel area of the region, killing 1 woman and wounding 3 others, of whom at least one of them was said to be in a critical condition. All of those injured in this mortar blast were later hospitalised for the injuries that they had sustained. Meanwhile, it was reported that 3 security men were injured after a remote-controlled bomb explosion hit a convoy of security forces in the Sepah Speen Qambar area of Bara Tehsil. The Pakistani security forces later cordoned off the area surrounding this blast and started conducting search operations within the local area.
- 9 July:- At least 100 people were killed and more than 120 others were reportedly injured after a suicide bomber on a motorbike attacked a local administrator's office within the Pakistani tribal village of Yakaghund, in the Mohmand Agency, which is located near the border between Afghanistan and Pakistan. It was later known that this suicide blast took place at the gate to the local administrator's office, according to local witnesses. This blast also reportedly struck a commercial area of the village and it is known that many shops and vehicles were damaged in this explosion. A local prison, as well as many government offices were also nearby to where this particular explosion occurred and it was later reported that a large number of people at the time were waiting outside the administrator's office when this suicide blast occurred. A witness claimed that the bike itself used in this suicide attack apparently lost its balance and was about to fall when a huge explosion occurred, a soldier on duty at this administrator's office has claimed. The dead apparently included both women and children and the injured have been shifted to local hospitals whereas the 40 most seriously injured people have been taken to hospitals within the Pakistani city of Peshawar. Security forces later cordoned off the area where this suicide blast took place and it is known that rescue teams are currently working at the scene of this bomb explosion within this particular village.
- 10 July:- At least 3 Pakistani soldiers were killed and 8 others were reportedly injured as a result of a militant ambush upon an army patrol within the Makeen district of South Waziristan. In a separate incident, it was reported that five Pakistani soldiers were injured after Taliban militants attacked a security post within the Kaniguram valley, which is located north of the region's main town of Wana, another security official later confirmed.
- 12 July:- Unidentified gunmen killed 2 Pakistani politicians in different parts of the country. In one incident, gunmen opened fire upon the vehicle of the leader of the National Party and the former district mayor in the city of Turbat within Pakistan's southwestern Baluchistan Province. He was reportedly killed in this attack and his driver was apparently injured, according to local police officials. Meanwhile, in the Buner district of the Khyber Agency, unidentified gunmen killed Muhammed Khan Baba Jan who had acted as the local leader of ruling Awami National Party within the district.
- 13 July:- In the agency of Bajaur within north-western Pakistan, it was reported that suspected Taliban militants blew up a girls school, in the latest wave of attacks targeting schools near to the Afghan border. No casualties were sustained in this attack.
- 14 July:- Unidentified gunmen assassinated a former senator and nationalist leader for the Balochistan National Party in Pakistan's south-western city of Quetta, which is located within the Baluchistan Province. It was later reported that unidentified gunmen had apparently killed, Habib Jalib, the secretary general of the opposition faction of the Balochistan National Party, as he was leaving his house on the outskirts in the city of Quetta.
- 15 July:- At least 6 people were killed and 47 others were injured in a suicide bomb attack next to a bus stop within the town of Mingora in Pakistan's Swat Valley, which is located within north-western Pakistan. This suicide blast struck a busy street next to the bus terminal and local police have indicated that a passing army patrol could have possibly been the intended target for this bombing. It is known that at least two of those killed were women and reports have even claimed that children were amongst those wounded in this suicide blast. Correspondents are claiming that this recent suicide bombing shows that militants are still very active within the Swat Valley despite military offensives conducted by the Pakistan Army, in order to remove Taliban militants from the area. The authorities have warned that the death toll could rise, as this suicide bomb explosion apparently occurred within a crowded area. In the town of Charsadda within north-western Pakistan, a bomb explosion struck a police vehicle and wounded at least six police officers within this volatile region of the country. Meanwhile, in the Pakistani southern port city of Karachi, unidentified gunmen killed at least 4 people.
- 16 July:- At least 10 people were killed and 20 others were injured in a bomb explosion at a weekly market, which was selling second-hand cars within Pakistan's tribal region of Khyber, in north-western Pakistan. It was later reported that this bomb blast occurred inside a bazaar in the town of Kuki Khel within Tirah, which is in a region of the country near to the Afghan-Pakistan border. This bomb was also apparently a timed device and was planted inside a ditch near the busy used car market, a senior local administration official later confirmed. It is also known that Pakistani security forces have conducted a number of operations against Taliban militants within this area of the Khyber region and that the town itself is on the NATO supply route into Afghanistan. There have reportedly been numerous attacks, which have been perpetuated by Taliban militants in the past, upon these NATO convoys within this particular tribal region of the country.
- 17 July:- At least 16 people were killed and several others were injured after militants armed with assault rifles attacked a convoy of civilian vehicles, which was being escorted by security forces, in the Kurram region of north-western Pakistan. It is known that this convoy was heading towards the main regional city of Peshawar however it was ambushed within the village of Char Khel, which is located within the Kurram region. It was also reported that some of those wounded in this attack are in a critical condition and that some unconfirmed reports have apparently claimed that the death toll is even as high as 18, in this particular ambush. Two low-intensity bomb explosions detonated in different parts of the eastern Pakistani city of Lahore. It was reported that several people were injured in these two bomb explosions. No group has yet claimed responsibility for these latest bombings.
- 18 July:- At least 1 person was killed and more than 20 others were apparently injured after a suicide bomber attacked a Shia worship hall in the city of Sargodha within Pakistan's Punjab (Pakistani province). The injured were reportedly rushed to hospital and it is known that the condition of 3 of those injured was described as serious, by officials at the scene. Witnesses at the scene of this attack have claimed that this attack was perpetuated by a teenager suicide bomber. An emergency was later declared at hospitals within Sargodha and police cordoned off the imambargah and asked people to clear the area where this suicide attack had reportedly taken place.
- 19 July:- Unidentified militants killed 2 Pakistani Christian brothers and wounded 1 policeman as they were leaving a court within the eastern Pakistani city of Faisalabad. They were reportedly accused of blasphemy against Islam and they were reportedly chained together outside the court as this attack occurred. The perpetrators reportedly managed to flee from the scene of this attack and some people have claimed that they were falsely accused of blasphemy by people who had a grudge against them, according to the victims families who have maintained their innocence.
- 21 July:- Unidentified militants fired a mortar at a security post within the Mohmand Agency, which is a tribal region close to the Pakistan-Afghan border. In this attack, it was later reported that 1 soldier was killed and that this security post was damaged.
- 23 July:- A series of killings across the major southern port city of Karachi, in southern Pakistan, over four days resulted in the deaths of at least 23 people. It is known that many of these attacks occurred within different areas of the city.
- 24 July:- Unidentified militants opened fire with automatic weapons, killing a Pakistani provincial minister's son and critically injuring his cousin, outside the north-western Pakistani city of Peshawar. The perpetrators reportedly fled from the scene by car after they had conducted their assault and a local official had later proclaimed this attack to be a targeted killing.
- 26 July:- At least 8 people were killed and around 21 others were apparently injured after a suicide bombing struck near a gathering, which was mourning the death of a cabinet minister's son who had reportedly been killed in a Taliban attack two days before. The suicide bomber reportedly targeted this gathering on foot and had apparently detonated his explosives close to the home of the Provincial Information Minister, as well as fairly close by to a nearby mosque within the town of Pabbi, which is near the Pakistani city of Peshawar. It was later reported that of the fatalities, 3 policemen and 5 civilians were amongst those who had been killed. It has also been speculated by a senior police officer that the suicide bomber appeared to have been a young boy and that the attacker had apparently been dropped off by a man on a motorcycle near to the minister's home, before he proceeded to detonate his explosives after policemen caught him trying to cross the checkpost.
- 2 August:- At least 13 people were killed and 16 others were apparently injured in violence and separate incidents of killings within the southern Pakistani port city of Karachi.
- 3 August:- At least 35 people were killed and 80 others were reportedly wounded in Pakistan's largest southern port city of Karachi. The violence erupted as protesters torched dozens of shops and vehicles following the assassination of a lawmaker, Raza Haider, who was apparently shot dead by unidentified militants in the city.
- 4 August:- At least 5 people were killed and 12 others were reportedly injured after a suicide bomber targeted a paramilitary police headquarters in the Pakistani city of Peshawar. It is known that the Chief of Pakistan's Frontier Constabulary was amongst those who had been killed in this particular attack. It has also been speculated that the death toll is expected to rise as some of those injured in this bombing are said to be in critical condition.
- 6 August:- Unidentified militants launched an attack upon a NATO oil tanker within Pakistan's south-western Baluchistan Province. In this militant attack, it was later reported that at least 1 person was killed and that 2 others were injured.
- 14 August:- At least 10 people were killed and 8 others were injured in a series of militant attacks within Pakistan's south-western Balochistan Province.
- 17 August:- Unidentified gunmen killed the son of a prominent Shia cleric and 3 policemen within the southern Pakistani port city of Karachi in a series of targeted attacks. It is known that a woman was also injured in these killings.
- 19 August:- At least 16 people were injured in a grenade attack at a crowded market within the town of Bannu, in the north-western province of Khyber Pakhtunkhwa, which is located in north-western Pakistan.
- 20 August:- Unidentified armed militants attacked two NATO trucks carrying supplies to NATO and U.S. forces in Afghanistan, setting them ablaze within Pakistan's south-western Baluchistan Province.
- 21 August:- At least 6 people were killed and 5 others were reportedly injured in a remote-controlled bomb explosion at a checkpoint, which targeted security officials and anti-Taliban tribal elders within the Mohmand Agency tribal district, of north-western Pakistan.
- 23 August:- At least 24 people were killed and more than 25 others were reportedly injured after a suicide bomber detonated his explosives at a mosque within the town of Wana, which is located in the tribal region of South Waziristan. It is known that this suicide blast apparently occurred within the main bazaar area of the town and that a former member of Pakistan's National Assembly, Maulvi Noor Mohammad was reportedly killed in this suicide bombing. The attacker reportedly struck however as he was greeting members of the congregation outside the local mosque. Meanwhile, it was reported that at least 7 people were killed in a separate bomb attack within the Kurram Agency of north-western Pakistan, which is located near the Afghan-Pakistan border.
- 25 August:- Unidentified gunmen killed a former lawmaker whilst he was making his way home within the Pakistani city of Quetta, which is located within Pakistan's southern Balochistan Province.
- 27 August:- Unidentified militants blew up a government-run girls middle school in north-western Pakistan in the Sipah area of Baratehsil, which is located within the Khyber tribal region of north-western Pakistan. There were no reported casualties in this militant bombing.
- 28 August:- Unidentified gunmen launched an attack upon a government building near to the U.S. consulate within the Pakistani city of Peshawar. It is known that 4 gunmen took several soldiers hostage however they later surrendered to Pakistani security forces after a nine-hour siege at the building.
- 29 August:- At least 3 people were killed and 7 others were reportedly injured after a bomb explosion occurred within a shop, in a local village, which was located in the South Waziristan Agency. Those wounded in this bomb explosion were later shifted to hospitals within the agency, as local police are trying to establish the cause of this particular bomb blast.
- 31 August:- Unidentified militants destroyed two NATO fuel tankers in Pakistan's southern towns of Mastung and Khuzdar, which are located within the Baluchistan Province. No casualties were reported in these two attacks.
- 1 September:- At least 30 people were killed and more than 250 others were reportedly injured in a series of three bomb explosions, which occurred during a Shia procession within the eastern Pakistani city of Lahore. It was later reported by the head of Lahore's police force, who claimed that at least two of these bomb explosions, were as a result of suicide bombings and that apparently at least 35 of those who were injured in these three bomb explosions were confirmed as being in a critical condition. These attacks have occurred, despite a lull in such bombings within the past month due to the Pakistan floods. The eastern Pakistani city of Lahore has previously been the scene of sectarian violence between the predominant Sunni Muslim majority and their Shia Muslim counterparts. This particular procession was marking the death of the Shia imam, Ali ibn Abi Talib and it is known that thousands of Shia Muslims had taken to the streets of Lahore to commemorate this occasion. Following these three bomb blasts, it was later reported that angry members of the general public apparently turned upon the local police, targeting both police officers and their facilities within the local area. It was also known that at least one police station, as well as a police truck and many other vehicles within the city were torched by protesters in response to these bombings. The Pakistani Prime Minister, Yousef Raza Gilani later condemned these bombings, in a statement that came in a response to these suicide bomb attacks.
- 2 September:- Unidentified militants killed a female school teacher and wounded two of her colleagues after they opened indiscriminate fire upon the teachers, as they were leaving for their homes after attending the school in the town of Khar, which is located within the Bajaur tribal region of north-western Pakistan.
- 3 September:- At least 73 people were killed and more than 200 others were reportedly injured in a suspected suicide bombing upon a Shia Muslim rally within the south-western Pakistani city of Quetta. This suicide blast was also reportedly followed by firing, according to local reports within the area. This suicide attack reportedly took place within the Meezan Chowk area of the city and it is known that this particular rally was reportedly a Palestinian solidarity march, which had been organised by Shia Muslim students in the city. This particular suicide attack is very significant, considering that it is the second such suicide attack to target Shia Muslims this week. It is known that some reports have claimed that several Pakistani journalists were amongst those who had been injured in this suicide bombing and that the media itself relayed pictures of the chaotic street scenes, with injured people being ferried to local hospitals within the area. These particular rallies are not uncommon, considering that these events usually take place every year on the last day of Ramadan, especially in supporting the Palestinian people's personal demands for their own homeland. The Pakistani Taliban later claimed responsibility for this suicide attack.
- 3 September:- A suicide bomber blew himself up outside a mosque belonging to the Ahmadiyya Muslim Community in Mardan, killing himself and an Ahmadi. Four other people were injured in the attack. Ahmadi Muslims, are considered heretical and have been persecuted in the Muslim world.
- 4 September:- At least 4 people were killed, including two soldiers, in two separate terrorist attacks in the southern Pakistani city of Karachi and the south-western Balochistan Province. No group has yet claimed responsibility for these two militant attacks. Unidentified militants attacked a NATO container in Pakistan's Punjab Province, which is located within the east of the country. It was later reported that at least 1 person was killed in this militant attack and that another 2 others were reportedly injured.
- 5 September:- Unidentified militants torched three NATO oil tankers, in Pakistan's south-western Balochistan Province, which were carrying fuel supplies to NATO and U.S. forces, which are currently stationed within neighbouring Afghanistan. No casualties were reported in this particular militant attack.
- 6 September:- At least 19 people were killed and more than 40 others were reportedly injured in a suicide car-bomb attack upon a police station, in the town of Lakki Marwat, which is located south of Peshawar within the Khyber Pakhtunkhwa province of north-western Pakistan. It is known that at least 11 police officers, as well as 4 school children were killed in this suicide attack and that a large undisclosed number of these two particular groups of people were apparently injured. It was later reported that the suicide car-bomber had struck a school van before he had actually rammed his explosive-laden vehicle into the back of the police station, to which he then proceeded to detonate his explosives. It is believed that rescue workers are currently digging through the rubble, which was left over from this bombing, in order to find any possible survivors who are trapped or more possible bodies under the debris. The police sub-inspector, Ameen Khan Marwat, was later pulled out alive from the rubble and it is believed that the death toll was quite high because all of the morning staff were at the station, at the time of this suicide attack because they had not yet all left for their own duties. It was also later reported that a neighbourhood shop, as well as a local mosque in the area were apparently damaged in this suicide bomb attack. The Pakistani Prime Minister, Yousuf Raza Gilani, later condemned this suicide attack. It is known that the Pakistani Taliban had later claimed responsibility for carrying out this particular suicide bombing. The militant group pledged more such attacks for the future unless these particular anti-Taliban militias disbanded. The situation in Pakistan, is getting increasingly more precarious, as correspondents within the area have claimed that this string of suicide attacks across the past week, shows that the Pakistani Taliban has regrouped and strengthened itself within the tribal regions of north-western Pakistan. It has also shown that despite such setbacks in Swat and Waziristan over the last two years, they are now quite capable of carrying out such suicide attacks across the entire country.
- 7 September:- At least 21 people were killed and nearly 100 others were reportedly injured after a suicide car bomber attacked the gates to a police headquarters, in the north-western Pakistani town of Kohat, local police officials in the area have claimed. It was later reported that this suicide car bomb explosion had reportedly targeted a police family compound, as people were apparently breaking their fast during the holy month of Ramadan. It is known that many buildings had reportedly collapsed or sustained damage in this suicide car bombing and that rescue workers are currently working at the scene of this bomb explosion. The Pakistani town of Kohat is located to the south-west of the Pakistani city of Peshawar and is based near Pakistani Taliban strongholds, which are located within the lawless tribal areas of the country. This attack comes only a day after yet another suicide car bombing killed 19 people and wounded more than 40 others in the Pakistani town of Lakki Marwat. The Kohat police spokesman, Fazal Naeem, later confirmed to local reporters that women and children were reportedly amongst those killed in this suicide bomb explosion. It is known that Pakistan's Interior Minister, Rehman Malik, later condemned this suicide car bomb attack, in a political statement that he made shortly afterwards. Correspondents within the area are also currently claiming that the Pakistani Taliban are once again back in business, with regards to their suicide attacks on military and civilian targets across the entire nation, despite a lull in such attacks during the recent Pakistan floods, which have affected a large proportion of the country.
- 8 September:- At least 3 people were killed and 7 others were reportedly injured in a bomb explosion that occurred within a marketplace in the city of Hub, which is located west of the major city of Karachi within Pakistan's south-western Balochistan Province.
- 9 September:- At least 10 people were killed and another 6 others were reportedly injured after a passenger van struck a roadside bomb within the Kurram tribal region, which is located near to the Afghan border. It is known that this roadside bomb attack had occurred within the village of Palaseen, which is positioned to the north-east of the region's main town of Parachinar, a government official later claimed. The region's deputy administrator, Hamid Khan, later reported that this roadside bomb was a remote-controlled explosive device and that it was detonated by unidentified militants as soon as a passenger van was over this device. This particular region of north-western Pakistan has recently been hit by numerous such attacks, robberies and kidnappings for ransom within the last three years. No group has yet claimed responsibility for this latest attack however the Pakistani Taliban are strong suspects for this particular bombing.
- 10 September:- At least 5 people were killed and 2 others were apparently injured after a suicide car bomb attack struck the Balochistan's provincial finance minister, Asim Ali Kurd's own personal residence in the south-western Pakistani city of Quetta. It is known that this bomb explosion was equivalent to 15 kg of TNT and that this bomb blast had apparently also occurred near to Quetta's Railway Housing Society area within the city.
- 23 September: – Four NATO oil tankers carrying fuel supplies to foreign forces in Afghanistan, were destroyed by unidentified militants within Pakistan's south-western Balochistan Province. No casualties were reported in these certain militant attacks.
- 25 September:- Unidentified militants torched 3 NATO containers within the Kalat district of the Balochistan Province in south-western Pakistan, which were apparently carrying supplies to foreign forces within neighbouring Afghanistan.
- 26 September:- Unidentified militants killed a driver and torched around 4 NATO oil tankers within the Kalat district of Pakistan's south-western Balochistan Province, which were carrying fuel supplies to foreign forces within neighbouring Afghanistan.

== October – December ==
- 1 October:- Unidentified militants killed 3 people and injured 5 others, as they torched around 40 NATO tankers near to the Shikarpur district of the Sindh province, which were carrying supplies to foreign forces in neighboring Afghanistan.
- 3 October:- Unidentified militants killed 3 people and injured 8 others, as they torched more than 20 NATO tankers near to Islamabad, which were carrying fuel to foreign forces fighting within neighboring Afghanistan.
- 5 October:- A remote-controlled roadside bomb explosion struck a military convoy, traveling from the major town of Miranshah to the nearby town of Datta Khel. It was later reported that 2 Pakistani soldiers were killed and 5 others were apparently injured in this roadside bomb blast within the tribal region of North Waziristan, which is located in north-western Pakistan.
- 6 October:- Unidentified militants killed a truck driver and torched some 20 NATO tankers on the outskirts of the south-western Pakistani city of Quetta, which were carrying fuel supplies to foreign forces fighting within neighboring Afghanistan.
- 7 October:- At least 9 people were killed and another 55 others were apparently injured after two suicide bombings occurred near to the entrance of a Sufi shrine in the southern Pakistani city of Karachi. These two simultaneous suicide blasts reportedly struck the busy Abdullah Shah Ghazi Shrine, which is located within the Clifton district of the city, as worshipers were apparently leaving the complex after evening prayers. A local police official later confirmed that at least two children were amongst those killed, in these twin suicide bomb blasts. The bombings took place outside the complex, on Thursday night, which is deemed by many to be the most busiest night of the week as people gathered to distribute food to poor people within society. After the blasts, it is known that dozens of security forces personnel had apparently arrived at the scene of these explosions, where blood was apparently splattered on the pavements, according to local correspondents within the area. It has also been reported that crowds of people are reportedly gathering outside the shrine to hear the fate and news, which is currently surrounding their loved ones as the security forces still continue and proceed in the cleaning up operation within the local area. It is known that the Sufi community within Karachi has apparently declared three days of national mourning in response to these twin suicide attacks. Security is apparently being tightened up significantly at mosques and other sensitive areas of the city. The Provincial Home Minister, Zulfiqar Mirza, said that the Sufi shrine had the best available security, however he did candidly admit that it was impossible to stop such suicide bombers from conducting their very own suicide attacks. These twin suicide bombings appeared to have echoed another previous twin suicide bomb attacks, which had previously occurred at yet another Sufi shrine within the eastern Pakistani city of Lahore much earlier this year. Later, firing in different areas wounded 7. The Pakistani President, Asif Ali Zardari later condemned these suicide attacks in the strongest possible terms and blamed the bombings on those who wanted to impose an extremist mind-set, as well as a strict lifestyle upon the citizens of the country.
- 9 October:- Unidentified militants, in south-western Pakistan, attacked and torched 30 NATO oil tankers, which were carrying fuel to foreign forces in neighbouring Afghanistan. No details surrounding the number of casualties sustained, were apparently specified from this militant attack.
- 15 October:- At least 5 Pakistani paramilitary soldiers were killed in an overnight militant attack upon their military checkpoint within the South Waziristan region, of north-western Pakistan. This particular region is considered by many, to be a Pakistani Taliban militant stronghold who are most active within the local area, correspondents have apparently claimed. A group of about a dozen, Pakistani Taliban insurgents, attacked a NATO supply truck within the Khyber tribal district, of north-western Pakistan. It was later reported that 2 people were killed and the truck was apparently later torched in this militant attack.
- 17 October:- At least 22 people were killed and several others injured in pre-election violence within Pakistan's biggest city of Karachi, which is located in southern Pakistan. This spate of violence comes as the city is set to hold a by-election for a seat in the provincial assembly.
- 18 October: – Unidentified militants attacked and torched several NATO trucks near the south-western Pakistani city of Quetta, which were apparently carrying fuel supplies to foreign forces in neighbouring Afghanistan. The suspected Pro-Taliban insurgents apparently later fled from the scene on motorbikes, after conducting their militant attack. No casualties were reportedly specified from this particular attack.
- 19 October:- Unidentified militants attacked and torched 2 NATO vehicles in the town of Dasht Bado, which is located in Pakistan's south-western Balochistan Province. No casualties were reported in this militant attack.
- 20 October:- At least 16 people were killed in political and ethnic violence within Pakistan's biggest, volatile city of Karachi, which is located in southern Pakistan. It is also known that in one such single attack that at least 8 were killed and 10 others injured after unidentified gunmen on motorbikes opened fire indiscriminately upon the Shershah Kabari market of the city. Whereas at least another 8 others were killed in other such violent incidents across this major Pakistani city. It is now known that at least 60 people, including several political activists, are now known to have been killed in a recent spate of violence to sweep across the city in as many such days.
- 22 October:- At least 6 Pakistani paramilitary soldiers, including a Pakistani Army colonel, were killed and 3 others injured in a roadside bomb explosion within the Yakh Kandaw area of the Orakzai Agency, which is located near to the Afghan border, of north-western Pakistan. It was later reported that the attack occurred, as a convoy of paramilitary troops was hit by a remote-controlled landmine and reports are claiming that this was the third bomb attack targeting soldiers on patrol in the area, in as many days. This bomb attack occurred amid claims that the Pakistani military has declared victory over the Pakistani Taliban this Summer. However local residents in the area have claimed that not all the Taliban hideouts in the area were wiped out, in the Pakistani military offensive, which was conducted earlier this year. At least 5 people were killed and 22 others injured, in a bomb attack at a mosque within the provincial capital of the north-western Pakistani city of Peshawar. It was later known that the bomb was detonated during Friday prayers, in an effort to maximize casualties. The Pakistani Taliban are strong suspects in the executing of this particular bomb attack.
- 24 October:- Unidentified militants torched 2 NATO vehicles in two separate incidents, within Pakistan's south-western Balochistan Province, which were carrying supplies to foreign forces fighting within neighbouring Afghanistan. No casualties were reported in this militant attack.
- 25 October:- At least 6 people were killed and more than 15 others injured in a motorcycle bomb attack outside a famous Sufi shrine within the eastern Pakistani city of Pakpattan, which is located in Pakistan's eastern Punjab Province. It was later known that two young men riding a motorcycle, had planted the explosive device in a milk churn on a motorcycle and had left it near the gate of the shrine of Baba Farid, a 12th-century Sufi Islamic saint within the city. It is known that at least 1 woman was amongst those killed in this particular bomb attack and that some of those injured in this bomb blast, are known to be in a critical condition at hospital. However, a doctor at a local hospital later claimed that at least 2 women were among those killed in this bomb attack. Local police suspected that this explosive device was detonated by remote control only a few minutes after it was planted in the area. Several nearby shops were reportedly damaged in this bomb explosion, although the marble mausoleum of Baba Farid itself was largely undamaged in this bomb attack. It is known that local TV footage later showed the twisted and charred remains of the motorcycle, in which the bomb was planted upon, as well as the debris from the nearby shops damaged in this bomb explosion. A prominent Sufi scholar later accused the government of not doing enough to prevent his community from coming under such terrorist-related attacks. This attack, is the latest as yet to target the Sufi minority, as suicide bombers have recently targeted such Sufi Shrines right across the country, such as in the Pakistani cities of both Karachi and Lahore. No group has yet claimed responsibility for this latest bomb attack, although the Pakistani Taliban are strong suspects for carrying out this bomb attack. At least 3 people were killed and 2 others injured, after a roadside bomb struck a passenger van within the Orakzai tribal region, of north-western Pakistan. It was reported by witnesses that this bomb blast tore apart the vehicle, which was apparently passing near the village of Tanda, when this roadside bomb attack occurred. The Pakistani Taliban are suspected of carrying out this roadside bombing.
- 1 November:- At least 2 police officers were killed and 13 others injured in a suicide bombing outside the Shah Mansoor compound. The compound reportedly housed both police offices and residences in the Swabi district, of north-western Pakistan. The suicide bomber's accomplices apparently fled after security forces opened fire at them after this suicide attack.
- 3 November:- Unidentified militants blew up two girls schools in the town of Safi tehsil, which is located within the Mohmand Agency, of north-western Pakistan. No casualties were reported by the local authorities.
- 5 November:- At least 72 people were killed and around 100 others injured in a suicide bombing at a mosque during Friday prayers within the village of Akhurwal, which is located in the Darra Adam Khel area near the FATA, of north-western Pakistan. It was later reported that the force of the bomb explosion was so powerful that the roof of the mosque apparently caved in and reportedly all that was left remaining was one wall of the building. Witnesses in the local area claimed that the bomber who was on foot, detonated his explosives at the main gate to the mosque, just after Friday prayers had finished and worshippers were departing from the mosque. The force of this explosion was apparently so powerful that some witnesses have apparently reported about being tossed in the air by the blast, being knocked to the ground or even simply hearing a big explosion. Witnesses have also claimed that the scene of the suicide blast resembled that of a graveyard and it is known that a number of children were among those killed and injured in this suicide bombing. It is known that local ambulances, volunteers and medical personnel ferried the survivors no nearby hospitals, including the Lady Reading Hospital in the major Pakistani city of Peshawar, which is located 30 miles north of the village. The authorities have claimed that the death toll is likely to rise, as some of those injured are apparently in a critical condition and they fear more bodies may be salvaged from the debris. It has been reported that a local tribal elder who encouraged people to take a stand against the Taliban may have possibly been the target for this suicide bombing. There has been a number of militant attacks culminating in mosque and shrine bombings recently however it was not immediately clear who carried out this suicide bombing. However it is known that the Pakistani Taliban have previously claimed responsibility for such similar attacks in the past and are known to have been most active in the Darra area of the region. This particular suicide attack is the deadliest such attack since a suicide bomber targeted a Shia Muslim rally in the south-western Pakistani city of Quetta. Media correspondents are claiming that this latest suicide bombing may have been a response by Taliban militants to the recent military and army offensives occurring within the Darra region, of north-western Pakistan.
- 11 November:- At least 20 people were killed and more than 100 others injured in a suicide truck bombing, which targeted the Criminal Investigation Department building within Pakistan's major, southern city of Karachi. It was later reported by police witnesses, that they had exchanged fire with the militants for at least 15 minutes, as they tried to storm the building. However then a truck which was laden with explosives detonated as it struck the boundary wall, almost completely destroying the structure. This truck bomb explosion was apparently so large that it was heard across some several miles of Pakistan's biggest city of Karachi. Eyewitnesses have also claimed that the blast left a crater some three meters wide. TV footage later showed bloodied victims being shifted away on stretchers and dozens of security personnel combing through the wreckage of this bomb explosion. A government spokeswoman, Sharmilla Farooqi, later claimed that 5 police officers were known to be among the fatalities of this truck bombing. There are some reports claiming that women police officers may be among the casualties, as there was a women's police station inside the building that was targeted. The site of this bomb explosion is within a high-security area of this major city, near to the Sindh Province chief minister's residence and several luxury hotels. Surrounding buildings were also apparently damaged in this bomb explosion, which shattered windows within a two-mile radius. This latest attack comes a day after the same such unit arrested some several wanted militants within the city, said to have been linked to Pakistan's most dangerous militant group of Lashkar-e-Jhangvi, which is linked to al-Qaeda and has been involved in a spate of high-profile attacks across the country. No group has yet claimed responsibility for this latest truck bomb attack, although the Pakistani Taliban have recently been behind a spate of similar such bombings targeting police and army compounds within recent months and years.
- 30 November:- At least 6 people were killed and around 20 others injured in a suicide bombing, which targeted a police van within the Pakistani city of Bannu. It is known that the suicide bomber had attacked the police vehicle on foot within the city, which is located within the Khyber Pakhtunkhwa Province, of north-western Pakistan. The fatalities of this suicide blast apparently included at least 1 police officer, 2 children and 3 other civilians. The area in which this suicide attack took place is positioned close to the Afghan-Pakistan border and is apparently a stronghold for the Pakistani Taliban and al-Qaeda. The Pakistan Army has launched military offensives within the region however these suicide attacks still occur throughout the north-west of the country with near impunity.
- 6 December:- At least 50 people were killed and more than 100 others injured, after two suicide bombers targeted a government compound within the main town of Ghalanai, which is located in the Mohmand Agency, of north-western Pakistan. It was later reported that two suicide bombers disguised in police uniforms perpetrated the attacks, as they targeted government officials meeting anti-Taliban allies. It is known that over 100 people were said to be inside the compound at the time of these two suicide attacks, as talks were in progression between government officials, tribal elders and local anti-Taliban groups. Witnesses are claiming that an undisclosed number of tribal elders, police officers and at least two journalists were amongst those killed. Eyewitnesses who witnessed the blasts claim that a deafening sound occurred followed by clouds of dust and smoke, with dozens of people on the ground, who were bleeding and crying, with reports of body parts scattered within the compound. A local administration later confirmed to the media that a suicide bomber on a motorbike had detonated his explosives, after he had driven up to a sitting area at the meeting. Whereas the second suicide attacker, also on a motorcycle had detonated his explosive device at the gate to this government compound. A possible target for these suicide attacks was Mohmand's top political official, Amjad Ali Khan, who was not killed or injured in these bombings. This top political official later confirmed that the suicide bombers had packed their suicide vests with ball-bearings, thus increasing the number of casualties. It was reported that about 25 people of whom were seriously injured in these suicide attacks, were taken for hospital treatment in the north-western Pakistani city of Peshawar. The area in which these attacks occurred borders neighbouring Afghanistan and is a known stronghold for the Taliban and Al-Qaeda. The Pakistani Taliban later claimed responsibility for these two suicide attacks. Despite Pakistan Army military offensives within this particular region, it is known that militant attacks still continue on a regular basis.
- 7 December:- At least 2 people were killed and 8 others injured, after a suicide bomber attempted to assassinate Chief Minister, Nawab Muhammad Aslam Khan Raisani, within the Pakistani city of Quetta, which is located in Pakistan's south-western Balochistan Province. It was later reported however that the Chief Minister was not harmed in this suicide attack. As he was in another vehicle when the suicide bomber attacked his motorcade. Chief Minister Raisani acts as an influential tribal leader, as well as a member of the country's ruling Pakistan Peoples Party. This bombing is the second such occasion, in which a senior government official has been attacked in the Balochistan Province. As Provincial Governor, Nawab Zulfiqar Magsi, managed to escape death or injury, after his convoy was struck by a roadside bomb in the Kalat district of the province earlier this month. The Balochistan Province has been the centre of a decade-long separatist insurgency and it is known that the Pakistani Taliban and other Radical Islamist militant groups operate within its provincial capital and northern districts. The Baloch Liberation Army, an insurgent group, later claimed responsibility for this suicide attack within the provincial capital city.
- 8 December:- At least 19 people were killed and 25 others injured, after a suicide bomber detonated his explosives at a bus terminal in the main bazaar within the Pakistani town of Kohat, which is located in north-western Pakistan. It was later claimed by a police spokesman that the suicide bomber had approached the door of a bus, to which he had then set off his explosives. The bus was apparently carrying passengers to the nearby Orakzai Agency and it is known that many of those killed in this suicide blast were on board the bus itself. Of those 25 injured, it is known that some of them are seriously wounded and it has been reported that many shops within the nearby market were also damaged in this explosion. The remains of a boy suicide bomber, aged between 15 and 16 were later discovered, as the severed head and legs were found, according to Dilawar Bangash, the Kohat police chief for the local area. The Pakistani town of Kohat is located close to the Afghan-Pakistan border, where the Pakistani Taliban have a strong regional presence. These militant groups have carried out scores of suicide bomb attacks recently, despite Pakistan Army offensives against their strongholds within this particular region of the country. The banned radical Islamist group, Lashkar-e-Jhangvi, later claimed responsibility for this suicide attack within this particular town of Kohat, in north-western Pakistan.
- 10 December:- At least 16 people were killed and more than 20 others injured, after a suicide-car bomber rammed his explosive-laden vehicle into a hospital, which acted as a Shia Muslim-run facility within the district of Hangu, in north-western Pakistan. This suicide car-bomb explosion follows the start of Muharram, which acts as an Islamic holy month, especially most important for Pakistan's Shia minority. Local investigators within the area are claiming that this suicide attack was most likely a sectarian attack, perpetrated by Sunni militant groups, which often target the Shia minority during this holy month of Muharram. Witnesses at the scene later claimed that an explosive-laden tractor and trailer had rammed into the hospital whilst people were praying in a hall within this facility. It was also reported by Hangu police chief, Abdul Rashid, that some 250 kg or (550 lb) of explosive material was used to conduct the suicide attack. This particular suicide car bombing acts as the fourth major suicide attack in just this week across the country. Most of these suicide attacks, including this particular car bombing, have occurred within the Khyber Pakhtunkhwa province, of north-western Pakistan.
- 13 December:- At least 2 people were killed and 4 others seriously injured, after a bomb explosion struck a school bus on Kohut road in the Bhana Marri area within the Pakistani city of Peshawar, which is located in north-western Pakistan. It was later reported that the bus driver and a 13-year-old boy were among the fatalities in this roadside bombing. Whereas it was reported that two girls of 13 and 6 years of age were apparently injured in this roadside bomb blast. The explosive device was apparently placed within a bin, similar to that which targets NATO forces in neighbouring Afghanistan. It is known that local police are examining the possibility that this bomb may have missed its intended target, being that of police patrols that frequently pass this particular area. It was reported that the bus was hit by the blast near to a private school, which apparently ripped through the vehicle leaving charred wreckage and remains, as well as leaving a crater on the nearby ground. The north-western Pakistani city of Peshawar is located close to Pakistani Taliban heartland tribal regions, as well as the nearby Afghan-Pakistan border. Local correspondents claim that militants have regularly attacked schools, especially those of girls' schools, but usually when no children are present or around. Such bomb attacks within the city however are not uncommon as the city has been the scene of numerous such bomb attacks, including those which target Pakistani security facilities and government instillations.
- 25 December:- At least 47 people were killed and over 100 others injured, after a female suicide bomber detonated her explosives in a large crowd of people displaced by fighting, who were collecting food at a distribution centre of the World Food Programme in the Pakistani town of Khar, which is located within the Bajaur tribal region, of north-western Pakistan.
