= 2010 Lakki Marwat suicide bombing =

2010 terror attack in Pakistan

Lakki Marwat suicide bombing
- Location: 32°25′52″N 70°58′2″E; Shah Hassan Khel, Lakki Marwat District, Khyber-Pakhtunkhwa, Pakistan
- Date: 1 January 2010; 16 years ago
- Attack type: Suicide bomb
- Weapon: unknown explosives
- Deaths: 105
- Injuries: +100
- Motive: Terrorism

The 2010 Lakki Marwat suicide bombing occurred on 1 January 2010, in the village of Shah Hassan Khel, Lakki Marwat District, in the Khyber-Pakhtunkhwa province of Pakistan. At least 105 people died and over 100 were injured, many of them critically, when the suicide bomber blew up his sport utility vehicle filled with explosives in the middle of a crowd that had gathered to watch a volleyball game.

== Attack ==
It was thought that the villagers were targeted because they had formed a pro government militia against the Taliban. In weeks before, militants threatened death to anyone who joined the militia. The bomber drove his Mitsubishi Pajero pickup truck into the middle of the playground, at a busy neighborhood, while a game between local male teams was in progress and detonated it. There were up to 400 people present. The bodies of players were thrown through the air by the blast. It was estimated that more than 600 pounds (270 kg) of explosives were used. Nearly 300 people had been watching the game when the blast happened. Among the dead were six children and five paramilitary soldiers. The remaining fatalities were mostly spectating teenagers. Witnesses said that flames leapt into the sky and there was a bright light before the explosion was heard.

The villagers had formed a 'peace committee' which was holding a meeting in a mosque when the blast occurred. The roof of the mosque caved in but none of the people attending the meeting were seriously injured. More than twenty surrounding houses were destroyed. People became trapped in collapsed buildings. In the darkness, vehicle headlights were used to search for victims. The blast was felt from 11 miles (18 kilometers) away.

By the day after the blast, no group had claimed responsibility for the bombing. According to analysts, this is frequently the case after an attack has killed many civilians. Pakistani security analyst retired Lieutenant General Talat Masood stated that attack was most likely carried out in retaliation by Taliban. He said "Definitely these are militant elements from North Waziristan and Taliban who have been very angry because the military had had a successful operation in Lakki Marwat and been able to clean up the place."

== Reactions ==
The village elders stated after the attack that they would continue opposing the Taliban. The head of the tribal council stated "Such attacks will only strengthen our resolve – being Pashtun, revenge is the only answer to the gruesome killings."

Altaf Hussain chief of Muttahida Qaumi Movement condemned the blast and called it an attempt to worsen Pakistan's situation further. The Khyber-Pakhtunkhwa government has announced Rs300,000 (US$3500, €2500) compensation for the family of each deceased and Rs100,000 (US$1200, €800) for each of the injured.

=== International reactions ===
- United States: Secretary of State Hillary Clinton released a statement: "The United States strongly condemns today's terrorist attack on civilians in Pakistan, and we offer our condolences to the families of the victims and all the people of Pakistan. The Pakistani people have seen terrorists target schools, markets, mosques, and now a volleyball game. The United States will continue to stand with the people of Pakistan in their efforts to chart their own future free from fear and intimidation, and will support their efforts to combat violent extremism and bolster democracy."
- European Union: The High Representative of the Union for Foreign Affairs and Security Policy, Catherine Ashton, condemned the attack in a statement: "I am shocked by the news of [the] brutal bomb attack at a sports event in Lakki Marwat that killed and injured a large number of innocent civilians. [...] In this difficult moment, the EU reaffirms its support for the government and the population of Pakistan."
- Russia: Dmitry Medvedev President of Russia expressed his condolences: "I was shocked to learn about a new crime committed by extremists – a bloody terrorist act during a volleyball game in the town of Lakki Marwat. Pakistan can rely on support from Russia and the entire international community in this fight. We have no doubts that the organizers of such inhuman crimes will surely be found and severely punished."
- United Kingdom: The Foreign Office condemned "this horrific attack that has led to the needless loss of so many lives".
- Mexico: The Ministry of Foreign Affairs expressed strong condemnation for the attack and Mexico's solidarity with the authorities of the country.
- Canada: The Canadian minister of foreign affairs Lawrence Cannon stated "Canada strongly condemns this cowardly attack on the people of Pakistan. We extend our deepest sympathies to the families and friends of those killed and wish a speedy recovery to the injured."

== See also ==
- List of terrorist incidents, 2010
- Terrorist incidents in Pakistan in 2010
- War in North-West Pakistan
- Terrorism in Pakistan
- Sectarian violence in Pakistan
- 2022 Lakki Marwat attack
- 2023 Lakki Marwat terrorist attack
