= Anwar Saifullah Khan =

Pakistani politician

Anwar Saifullah Khan أنور سيف الله خان

Senator for Khyber Pakhtunkhwa
- In office 21 December 1990 – 21 March 1997
- Preceded by: Salim Saifullah Khan

Minister for Petroleum and Natural Resources
- In office 26 January 1994 – 5 November 1996
- Prime Minister: Benazir Bhutto
- Preceded by: Jehangir Badar
- Succeeded by: Nouraiz Shakoor

Minister for Environment and Urban Affairs
- In office 24 January 1990 – 18 July 1993
- Prime Minister: Nawaz Sharif
- Succeeded by: Shahida Jamil

Personal details
- Born: 7 June 1945 (age 81) Peshawar, North West Frontier Province, British India (now Khyber Pakhtunkhwa, Pakistan)
- Party: PMLN (2024-present)
- Other political affiliations: IPP (2023-2024); PMLN (2022-2023); PTI (2018-2022); PMLN (2013-2018); Pakistan Peoples Party; PML-Q (2001-2008); PMLN (1997-1999); Pakistan Muslim League (J) (1993-1997); Islami Jamhoori Ittehad (1988-1993); Pakistan Muslim League (1985-1988)
- Relations: Salim, Humayun (brothers); Ghulam Ishaq Khan (father-in-law); Omar Ayub Khan (son-in-law)
- Education: University of Peshawar; Christ Church, Oxford; University of Southern California

Anwar Saifullah Khan (Urdu: أنور سيف الله خان; born 7 June 1945) is a Pakistani politician and industrialist. As a member of the Pakistan Muslim League (Junejo), he served in Prime Minister Nawaz Sharif's cabinet as Federal Minister of Environment and Urban Affairs from 1990 to 1993 and as Federal Minister for Petroleum and Natural Resources from 1994 to 1996 in coalition with Prime Minister Benazir Bhutto.

He was also elected to the Senate from Khyber Pakhtunkhwa in 1990, serving until 1997.

In the 2008 general elections, Saifullah contested for two provincial seats from Lakki Marwat, and was elected to the Khyber Pakhtunkhwa Assembly from both. He became a member of Pakistan People's Party in 2008.

== Early life and family ==
Anwar Saifullah Khan was born in Peshawar into the Saifullah family hailing from Marwat tribe of Pashtuns. He is the son of Begum Kulsum Saifullah, and the brother of politicians Salim and Humayun Saifullah Khan. He is also the son-in-law of former President Ghulam Ishaq Khan, and the father-in-law of Omar Ayub Khan, the grandson of Pakistan's former military dictator Ayub Khan.

Anwar Saifullah was educated at the University of Peshawar, and Christ Church, Oxford. He took the post of co-chairman of Saif Group, a Pakistani conglomerate, in 1984.

== Political career ==
Anwar Saifullah Khan was elected to the Senate from Khyber Pakhtunkhwa in 1990, serving until 1997 as a member of the Pakistan Muslim League (Junejo). He served in Prime Minister Nawaz Sharif's cabinet as Federal Minister of Environment and Urban Affairs from 1990 to 1993, and as Federal Minister for Petroleum and Natural Resources from 1994 to 1996 in coalition with Prime Minister Benazir Bhutto.

In the 2008 general elections, Saifullah contested for two provincial seats from Lakki Marwat, and was elected to the Khyber Pakhtunkhwa Assembly from both. He later joined Pakistan People's Party as a candidate for Governor of Khyber Pakhtunkhwa, but this was vetoed by coalition partner Awami National Party, a rival of the Saifullah family. He was instead appointed President of PPP Khyber Pakhtunkhwa, but resigned following his defeat in the 2013 general elections.

== See also ==
- Lakki Marwat
