= National Commission for Human Development =

The Government of Pakistan established National Commission for Human Development (NCHD), through Presidential Ordinance No. XXIX of 19th July 2002 as a Federal Government statutory autonomous body, mandated with the role to support and augment human development efforts in Pakistan. The President of Islamic Republic of Pakistan is the Patron-in-Chief of the Commission. The Commission consists of its Chairman, four representatives from the Provinces with gender equality and representatives from M/o Finance and Federal Education. The ordinance of NCHD has been protected under Article 270 AA of the constitution of Islamic republic of Pakistan in 18th Constitutional amendment. Initially NCHD was attached with the Cabinet Division and on 29th July, 2011 notification, the NCHD was placed through administrative control of Ministry of Federal Education & Professional Training, Islamabad.
