= Yusuf Khattak =

Pakistani politician and Federal Minister

Minister of Petroleum and Natural Resources
- In office 14 August 1974 – 5 July 1977
- President: Fazal Ilahi Chaudhry
- Prime Minister: Zulfikar Ali Bhutto
- Preceded by: VAdm SM Ahsan
- Succeeded by: Lt. Gen. Yaqub Khan

Personal details
- Born: Muhamad Yusuf Khan Khattak; 18 November 1917 Oghi District, Mansehra, (Note: Where his father KB Mohammed Quli Khan, was posted as British civil service members) NWFP, British Indian Empire (Present-day Pakistan)
- Died: 29 July 1991 (aged 73) Islamabad, Pakistan
- Citizenship: British Subject (1917–47); Pakistan (1947–91)
- Party: Pakistan Peoples Party
- Other political affiliations: Muslim League
- Relations: Aslam Khattak (brother); Habibullah Khan (brother); Mehr-un-Nisa (sister)
- Education: Government College University; Oxford University
- Occupation: Politician
- Cabinet: Z.A. Bhutto Government

Muhamad Yusuf Khan Khattak (18 November 1917 – 29 July 1991) was a Pakistani politician, left-wing intellectual, lawyer, and noted Pakistan Movement activist from Khyber Pakhtunkhwa.

Although an early member of the Muslim League, he actively participated in politics through the left-oriented Pakistan Peoples Party (PPP), which he served as the minister of petroleum under the government of Prime Minister Zulfikar Ali Bhutto.

He was a highly respectable statesman and represented Pakistan at various international conferences during his political career.

== Biography ==
=== Early life and education ===
Yusuf Khattak was born into a prominent Pashtun Khattak family, of Karak, North-West Frontier Province (NWFP) now Khyber Pakhtunkhwa Province. His father, Khan Bahadur Kuli Khan Khattak, was an influential figure in the nationalist politics of the then-NWFP.

He was the youngest son of Quli Khan Khattak. His older brothers included Aslam Khattak, who served as the Governor of Khyber Pakhtunkhwa, and Habibullah Khattak, who enjoyed a distinguished career with the Pakistan Army.

After initially studying at the private Aitchison College in Lahore, he made a transfer to the renowned Government College University (GCU) in Lahore. At GCU, he graduated with BA in comparative literature and poetry, and moved to the United Kingdom for higher studies. He attended the Oxford University where he earned a BA in history, followed by MA in modern history. At Oxford University, he passed the bar exam to practice law and was Lincoln's Inn.

However, he returned to India to join the All India Muslim League and played a prominent role in the Pakistan Movement.

=== Political activism and the petroleum ministry ===
In November 1946, he led a group of 100 volunteers of Frontier Muslim League to Bihar for relief work after the massacre of Muslims there. During the Civil disobedience movement in British India, Khattak was arrested and sent to jail along with other leaders of the Muslim League. ln spite of his release orders, he refused to come out of the jail and persistently defied the orders by remaining behind the bars till Muhammad Ali Jinnah gave a clarion call to the Muslim League leaders to fight the battle for referendum in North West Frontier Province.

Yusuf Khattak led the Pakistan Movement section against the Khyber-Pakhtunkhwa Congress government under Dr Khan Sahib. A close confidante of Liaqat Ali Khan, he became secretary general of the Muslim League after the independence of Pakistan in 1947. However, he fell out with Muslim League Chief Minister Abdul Qayyum Khan, who actively organised a campaign to oust him and his colleagues like Barrister Khan Saifullah Khan, from any role in provincial politics.

He was then elected secretary general of the Provincial Muslim League, Khyber-Pakhtunkhwa in 1949. He was soon elevated to the prominent position of secretary general of All Pakistan Muslim League the same year thereby succeeding Liaquat Ali Khan, prime minister of Pakistan as secretary general of the league.

== Leader of the opposition ==
Frequently in the opposition, he was elected the leader of the opposition in the National Assembly of Pakistan and was a prominent leader in the campaign of Fatima Jinnah against Field Marshal Ayub Khan's military government.

A prominent critic of Khan Abdul Ghaffar Khan's Pakhtunistan policy, he also rejected the National Awami Party's claim to be the sole representative of Pashtuns.

Reconciling with Qayyum Khan before the bye-elections of 1971, he joined the Pakistan Muslim League-Qayyum faction and contested and won the election from Qayyum Khan's vacated Peshawar seat.

As part of Qayyum Khan's alliance with the Pakistan Peoples Party, Yusuf Khattak was appointed Federal Minister for Fuel, Power and Natural Resources in Prime Minister Zulfiqar Ali Bhutto's Cabinet. He was re-elected to his seat in the 1977 election despite the Qayyum League's rout.

== Commemorative postage stamp ==
Pakistan Post Office issued a commemorative postage stamp to honor him in its 'Tehreek-e-Pakistan Ke Mujahid' series in 2003.

== Death ==
Yusuf Khattak died on 29 July 1991 at Islamabad, Pakistan after a long illness.

== See also ==
- Aslam Khattak
- Abdul Qayyum Khan
- Liaqat Ali Khan
