= Munawar Khan =

Pakistani politician

Member of the Provincial Assembly of Khyber Pakhtunkhwa
- In office 13 August 2018 – 18 January 2023
- Constituency: PK-91 (Lakki Marwat-I)
- In office 2008 – 28 May 2018
- Constituency: Constituency PK-76 (Lakki Marwat-III)

Personal details
- Party: JUI (F) (2013-present)
- Other political affiliations: PMLN (2008-2013)

Munawar Khan is a Pakistani politician and legal advocate who had been a Member of the Provincial Assembly of Khyber Pakhtunkhwa, from 2008 to May 2018 and from August 2018 to January 2023.

== Personal life ==
He is an advocate by profession.

== Political career ==
He ran for the seat of the National Assembly of Pakistan as an independent candidate from Constituency NA-27 (Lakki Marwat) in the 2008 Pakistani general election but was unsuccessful. He received 100 votes and lost the seat to Humayun Saifullah Khan. In the same election, he was elected to the Provincial Assembly of the North-West Frontier Province as an independent candidate from Constituency PF-76 (Lakki Marwat-III) in 2008 Pakistani general election. He received 18,871 votes and defeated a candidate of Pakistan Muslim League (N) (PML-N).

He was re-elected to the Provincial Assembly of Khyber Pakhtunkhwa as a candidate of Jamiat Ulema-e Islam (F) from Constituency PK-76 (Lakki Marwat-III) in the 2013 Pakistani general election. He received 28,961 votes and defeated a candidate of PML-N.

He was re-elected to Provincial Assembly of Khyber Pakhtunkhwa as a candidate of Muttahida Majlis-e-Amal (MMA) from Constituency PK-91 (Lakki Marwat-I) in the 2018 Pakistani general election.
