= Mohammad Anwar Khan (Lakki Marwat politician) =

Pakistani politician

Member of the National Assembly of Pakistan
- In office 13 August 2018 – 10 August 2023
- Constituency: NA-36 (Lakki Marwat)

Personal details
- Party: Jamiat Ulema-e-Islam (F)

Mohammad Anwar Khan is a Pakistani politician who served as a member of the National Assembly of Pakistan from August 2018 till August 2023.

== Political career ==
He was elected to the National Assembly of Pakistan as a candidate of Muttahida Majlis-e-Amal (MMA) from the NA-36 (Lakki Marwat) constituency in the 2018 Pakistani general election. He received 91,065 votes and defeated Ishfaq Ahmad Khan, a candidate of Pakistan Tehreek-e-Insaf (PTI).

== More Reading ==
- List of members of the 15th National Assembly of Pakistan
- No-confidence motion against Imran Khan
