= Saif Group =

Pakistani conglomerate

- Native name: گروه سیف
- Type: Corporate group
- Traded as: PSX: SAIF; PSX: KOHTM; PSX: SPWL
- Industry: Textile, Power Generation
- Founded: 1927
- Founder: Saifullah Khan
- Headquarters: Islamabad, Pakistan
- Owner: Saifullah Khan family
- Website: saifgroup.com

Saif Group (Urdu pronunciation: [seːf] SAYF) is a group of companies headquartered in Islamabad. It operates in power, health care, textiles, real estate, and telecommunications. It is majority owned by Saifullah Khan family.

== History ==
The industrial roots of the Saif Group trace to the 1920s, when Khan Faizullah Khan, a landowner from Lakki Marwat in the North-West Frontier Province of British India, became one of the largest Muslim government contractors of the British Indian administration and, in 1927, acquired the Bannu Electric Supply Company, one of the earliest power stations in the Indian subcontinent. His son, the barrister-turned-industrialist Saifullah Khan, expanded the family's enterprise during the Second World War by establishing a canning business that supplied the British Indian Army.

Saifullah Khan died in April 1964, leaving the family business to his widow, Begum Kulsum Saifullah Khan, who led the group from 1964 to 1990. In 1967, Begum Kulsum incorporated Kohat Textile Mills, a spinning unit located in Saifabad, Kohat, which commenced commercial production in 1970.

In 1989, Saif Textile Mills Limited was incorporated as a public limited company and commenced commercial production at the Gadoon Amazai Industrial Estate in Swabi District of Khyber Pakhtunkhwa on 1 January 1992. The group's holding company, Saif Holdings Limited, was incorporated on 4 February 1993 under the Companies Ordinance, 1984 to consolidate the family's investments in subsidiary and associated companies. In June 1994, Saif Group entered into a joint venture with Motorola of the United States to incorporate Pakistan Mobile Communications Limited (PMCL), which launched Mobilink, the first GSM cellular telephone service in South Asia. In February 2001, Orascom Investment Holding of Egypt acquired Motorola's stake in Mobilink to become the majority shareholder and in June 2007, Orascom acquired the residual shares held by Saif Group. Saif Healthcare Limited was incorporated on 3 October 1996 and was subsequently converted into a public company in 2009 to operate the group's hospitals.

In 2004, Saif Power Limited was incorporated as a public limited independent power producer (IPP) under the Government of Pakistan's Power Policy 2002. Its 225 megawatt dual-fuel combined-cycle thermal power plant at Qadarabad, Sahiwal District, Punjab, achieved commercial operations on 30 April 2010 under a 30-year power purchase agreement with the National Transmission & Despatch Company (NTDC).

In January 2006, Saif Group incorporated the Mediterranean Textile Company (MTC), a joint venture with an Egyptian company based at the Borg-Al-Arab Industrial Area near Alexandria. Also in 2006, the telecommunications affiliate Trans World Associates (TWA) commenced operations of the 1,300-kilometre TW1 submarine fibre-optic cable connecting Karachi, Fujairah in the United Arab Emirates, and Al Seeb in Oman; the cable was the first private-sector submarine network in Pakistan. Kulsum International Hospital, a 67-bed (subsequently expanded to 100-bed) cardiology-focused private hospital at Blue Area, Islamabad, was established in 2011.

In August 2020, a joint venture between OGDCL, Mari Petroleum Company, and Saif Energy Limited announced a hydrocarbon discovery at the Togh Bala-1 well in the Kohat exploration block of Khyber Pakhtunkhwa, producing approximately 9 million standard cubic feet per day of gas and 125 barrels per day of condensate. In December 2017, Saif Group launched Eighteen Islamabad, a US$ 2 billion mixed-use residential and commercial development, in a joint venture with the Egyptian Sawiris family's Ora Developers and Kohistan Builders & Developers, on a 2.77 million-square-yard site near Islamabad International Airport.

== Subsidiaries ==
=== Listed ===
==== Saif Textile Mills ====
Saif Textile Mills Limited, with installed capacity of 88,476 spindles is located at Gadoon Amazai in the Swabi district, Khyber Pakhtunkhwa, Saif Textile Mills is a public traded company which is headquartered in Rawalpindi and majority owned by Saif Group.

==== Kohat Textile Mills ====
Kohat Textile Mills with installed capacity of 44,400 spindles is located in Kohat.

==== Saif Power ====
Saif Power Limited was incorporated in 2004. It operates a 225 MW combined cycle thermal power plant in Sahiwal District which was built at a cost of $170 million. The plant began commercial operations in 2010.

The original power purchase agreement (PPA) was signed by the Government of Pakistan with the sovereign guarantee and it offered 18.5 percent return on equity with United States dollar indexation. However, in August 2020, PPA was revised and US dollar indexation was removed. In December 2024, its PPA was revised again by the Government of Pakistan and it was changed from take or pay basis to hybrid take and pay basis.

=== Unlisted ===
==== Mediterranean Textile ====
Mediterranean Textile Company is located in Egypt; it has an installed capacity of 63,312 spindles for the production of cotton yarn

==== Saif Energy ====
Saif Energy Limited (SEL) holds interests in 4 blocks with a total oil and gas exploration acreage of 3109.66 km^{2} in consortium with other energy and power companies, including Pakistan's state-owned Oil & Gas Development Company (Pakistan), Mari Energies (Pakistan) and Tullow Oil (Ireland).

== Real estate ==
The Saif Group is developing an area of open land located near Islamabad International Airport into a luxury planned urban development housing project named Eighteen Islamabad; in conjunction with the real estate investment company of Egypt's Sawiris family.

== Health care ==
Its health care division Saif Healthcare Limited owns and manages:

- Kulsum International Hospital – a comprehensive cardiology facility located on Islamabad's Blue Area's primary thoroughfare Khayaban-e-Quaid-e-Azam Jinnah Avenue to deliver services to the rising demand for private sector health care in the Federal Capital Region.
