= Begu Khel =

Coordinates: 32°31′51″N 70°57′15″E

- Union council and town
- Interactive map of Begu Khel
- Country: Pakistan
- Province: Khyber Pakhtunkhwa
- District: Lakki Marwat District
- Time zone: UTC+5 (PST)

Begu Khel is a town and union council of Lakki Marwat District in Khyber Pakhtunkhwa province of Pakistan. It is located at 32°31'51N 70°57'15E and has an altitude of 341 metres (1122 feet).
