= Shahbaz Azmat Khel =

Coordinates: 32°57′N 70°40′E

Shahbaz Azmat Khel shaboz kala
- Town and union council
- Interactive map of Shahbaz Azmat Khel
- Country: Pakistan
- Province: Khyber-Pakhtunkhwa
- District: Bannu District

Government
- Time zone: UTC+5 (PST)

Shahbaz Azmat Khel is a town and union council in Bannu District of Khyber Pakhtunkhwa, Pakistan.
