= Salim Saifullah Khan =

Pakistani politician

- سلیم سیف اللہ خان
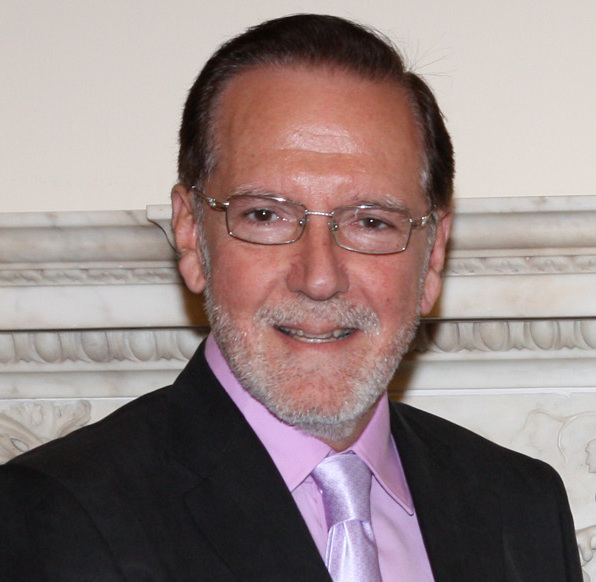
- Khan in 2011.

Member Senate of Pakistan
- In office 2006–2012

Personal details
- Born: 13 September 1947 (age 79) Lakki Marwat, Khyber Pakhtunkhwa, Pakistan
- Party: Independent (2022-present)
- Other political affiliations: PTI (2018-2022); PMLN (2013-2018); PPML (2009-2013); PML(Q) (2001-2009); PMLN (1997-1999); PML(J) (1993-1997); IJI (1988-1993); PML (1985-1988)
- Education: Carnegie Mellon University

Salim Saifullah Khan (Urdu: سلیم سیف اللہ خان) is a Pakistani politician and former Senator and a former president of Pakistan Peoples Muslim League. He was a member of Senate of Pakistan from 2006 to 2012. He served as Chairman of Pakistan's Senate Foreign Relations, Kashmir Affairs and Gilgit Baltistan Committee.

== Early life ==
Salim Saifullah Khan was born into an affluent family of the Marwat tribe of Lakki Marwat, Khyber Pakhtunkhwa, Pakistan.

He has, in the past, remained Finance Minister, Industries, Khyber-Pakhtunkhwa. He was also deputy opposition leader in Khyber-Pakhtunkhwa Provincial Assembly in 1993. Salim Saifullah Khan has held portfolios of Housing, Commerce, Petroleum and Inter-Provincial Coordination as a Federal Minister. He has most recently served as the Chairman of Senate's Foreign Relation Committee. Presently Salim Saifullah Khan is Honorary Consul General of Turkey, at Peshawar.

He was elected President, Pakistan Tennis Federation on 12 December 2014.

Khan is a graduate of Carnegie Mellon University of Pittsburgh, Pennsylvania, USA. He is a chief of the Marwat Pashtun tribe. He is the brother of Anwar Saifullah Khan former Federal Minister Petroleum and Humayun Saifullah Khan former Member National Assembly. His mother Begum Kulsum Saifullah Khan, Hilal-e-Imtiaz Pakistan, was also a member of the National Assembly of Pakistan and a former federal minister.

== Representations abroad ==
- 2004: Member Pakistan delegation to UNGA.
- 2004 Head of Pakistan Delegation to Afghanistan.
- October 2003 Head of Pakistan Delegation, Bangladesh.
- June 2003 Head of Pakistan Delegation, UMNO conference, Kuala Lumpur, Malaysia.
- Member of Parliamentary Delegation to Australia
- 1991. Leader of Pakistan Delegation to I.L.O. Geneva
- 1986 - Headed an official Pakistani delegation to Japan.
- 1978- Member of Official Delegation to Japan and Hong Kong,
- 1975- Member of Textile Delegation to China and Far East.
- 1974- Pakistan Delegation of ILO. Conference, Geneva.

== Professional achievements ==
- July 2022 to date, President of the Board of Governors of the Ghulam Ishaq Khan Institute (GIK), (Center of excellence for Science*& Technology).
- March 2010 to date, Hononary Consul General of Republic of Türkiye at Peshawar.
- December 2014 to 2024, President, Pakistan Tennis Federation
- 1994 - Co-Chairman, Lucky Cement Ltd.
- 1993- President, Pakistan Badminton Association.
- 1964-1968- Captain Tennis Team Carnegie Mellon University USA
- 1973- Member Advisory Council Economic Affairs, Government of Pakistan.
- 1973-76- Chairman All Pakistan Flour Mills Association, Khyber-Pakhtunkhwa Zone Peshawar.
- 1978- Member Executive Committee, All Pakistan Lawn Tennis Association.
- 1978- Chairman APTMA, All Pakistan Textile Mills Association. Member Price Commission, Government of Pakistan. Vice Chairman, All Pakistan Mills Association, Karachi.
- 1974-76- Chairman, All Pakistan Textile Mills Association, Khyber-Pakhtunkhwa Zone Peshawar.
- Life member – Lahore Press Club.
