= Humayun Saifullah Khan =

Member of the National Assembly of Pakistan
- In office 2008–2013

Personal details
- Born: 14 June 1949 (age 77)
- Party: PMLN (2024-present)
- Other political affiliations: IPP (2023-2024); PTI (2018-2022); PMLN (2013-2018); Pakistan Peoples Muslim League (2009-2013); PML-Q (2001-2009)
- Relatives: Saifullah Khan family

Humayun Saifullah Khan is a Pakistani politician and a former Member of the National Assembly of Pakistan from 2008 to 2013. He belongs to the Saifullah Khan family from Khyber Pakhtunkhwa province.

== Political career ==
He has served as District Nazim of Lakki Marwat from 2001 to 2005. He was re-elected as District Nazim of Lakki Marwat from 2005 to 2009.

He was elected to the National Assembly of Pakistan from NA-27 (Lakki Marwat) as a candidate of Pakistan Muslim League (Q) in the 2008 Pakistani general election.
