= Lakki Marwat =

Pakistani town

Lakki Marwat لکی مروت
- District Headquarter / City
- District Lakki Marwat
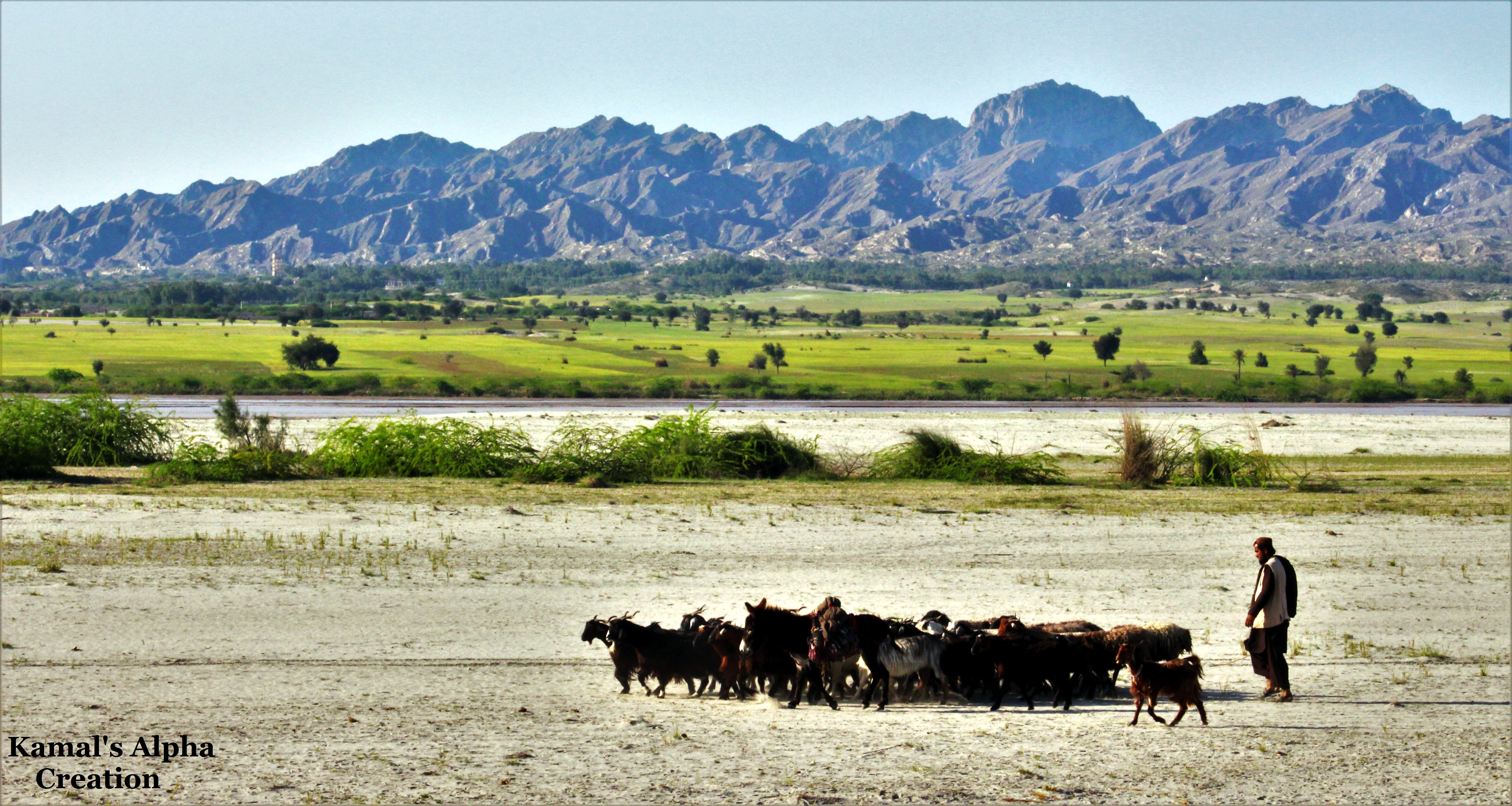

- Location within Khyber Pakhtunkhwa Location within Pakistan
- Coordinates: 32°36′19″N 70°54′52″E
- Country: Pakistan
- Province: Khyber Pakhtunkhwa
- District: Lakki Marwat District

Government
  - Type: Tehsil-council
  - Chairman: Maulana Anwar Badshah (JUI-F)
  - Deputy Commissioner: Mr. Iqbal Hussain Bacha
  - Assistant Commissioner HQ: Mr. Omer Riyaz
  - Assistant Commissioner: Mr. Awais Khan
- Elevation: 255 m (837 ft)

Population (2023)
  - Total: 70,759
- Time zone: UTC+5 (PST)
- Calling code: 0969
- Number of Union councils: 2
- Website: lakkimarwat.kp.gov.pk

Lakki Marwat or Lakki (Urdu and Pashto: لکی مروت) is the headquarters of Lakki Marwat District in Khyber Pakhtunkhwa province of Pakistan. Lakki Marwat has become one of the fastest growing cities in Khyber Pakhtunkhwa. Lakki Marwat is also the 20th most populous city in the province of Khyber Pakhtunkhwa.

== History ==
=== Origins ===
Lakki was first called by the name of "Thal Daman", which means an open sandy plain. The first evidence of civilization in the plains of Thal Daman and the spread of Islam in Bannu is indicated by the graves of Ashaab on the left bank of the Kurram River. In addition, contemporary historians write about Bannu in their works. Al-Baladuri wrote that "In the year 44 H. [664 AD], and in the days of the Khalif Muawiya, Muhallib son of Abu Safra made war upon the same frontier, and advanced as far as Banna and Alahwar which lie between Multan and Kabul.”

The tribes of Lakki Marwat, such as the [Bannuchi] are mentioned in the memoirs of Mughal Emperor Babur. He considered the whole of the valley which is now the Tahsil of Bannu and Marwat, as 'Bannu territory'. Babur also stated that when he came to Bannu in 1505, the Niazis were settlers in what now is Marwat. In 1602, the Niazis were driven out by Marwat towards Isakhel.

In 1756, Ahmad Shah Durrani incorporated the whole of the Bannu territory into the Durrani Empire centred at Kandahar (later Kabul).

In 1818, the Nawab of the area, Hafiz Ahmed Khan Sado Zai, annexed Isakhel. The following year, he was invited by the White Gund of Marwats to aid him against the Black Gund of Marwats. After doing this, the Nawab, took possession of the whole Marwat area.

In 1836, Maharaja Ranjit Singh formally annexed Marwat and leased it for an annual sum of Rs. 40,000 to a tax collector called Dewan Lakki Mull. Dewan Lakki Mull then settled some of the Hindu inhabitants across the Gambila River towards the north. Eventually, these settlements turned into a small town known as Lakki. It was through Dewan Lakki Mull that the area derived its name 'Lakki'.

After Dewan Lakhi Mull, Malik Fateh Khan Tiwana became the area's tax collector. He belonged to the Tiwana family and was an ancestor of Malik Khizar Hayat Tiwana. In 1844, he built and garrisoned a fort in the heart of Marwat which he called Ihsanpur. A town grew up under its walls and became the capital of Marwat. He induced many of the leading classes to settle near it, so a number of families that had moved to Isakhel returned to the region.

=== British rule ===
On 20 March 1849, the Punjab region was annexed by the East India Company. The province was divided into the districts of Leiah and Dera Ismail khan. The Isakhel and Marwat, was put into the Dera Ismail Khan District. On 1 January 1861, the Leiah District was broken up and the Dera Jat District was formed with Bannu as its most northern area.

In 1862, Bannu district was expanded to include parts of Mianwali District, such as Pakhar Kalabagh, a tract lying along the eastern base of the salt range, and the villages of Harnoli and Wan Bhachran. Therefore, the whole of the North-West Frontier Province, including Bannu, Peshawar, Hazara and Kashmir remained part of the Punjab Province until 1901. Malik Fateh Khan Tiwana's old fort town of Ihsanpur continued to be the capital of Marwat until 1864. That year, it had to be abandoned when the Gambila River flooded the area making it into a marsh. The District Officer, Major Urmston, allowed the inhabitants to move across to the right bank of the Gambila and settle amongst a cluster of villages consisting of Mina Khel, Khoedad Khel and Sayed Khel.

The municipality was constituted in 1874. On 9 November 1901, the Mianwali District was formed out of the tehsils of Isa Khel and Mianwali from the Bannu District and Bhakkar and Leyyah from Dera Ismail Khan District. The population in 1901 was 5,218.

=== Post-Independence ===
A Narrow gauge (762 mm or 2 ft 6 in) railway line was linked it with Mari Indus, Bannu and Tank, Pakistan, was closed in 1991.

On 1 January 2010, at least 99 people were killed in the nearby village Shah Hassan Khel when a terrorist suicide bomber blew himself up at a volleyball game.

== Demographics ==
=== Population ===
Historical Population
Year	Pop.	±% p.a.
1951	8,634	—
1961	9,451	+0.91%
1972	14,359	+3.88%
1981	18,755	+3.01%
1998	30,467	+2.90%
2017	59,465	+3.58%
2023	70,759	+2.94%

As of the 2023 census, Lakki Marwat had a population of 70,759.

== See also ==
- Lakki Marwat District
- Bannu Division
- List of cities in Khyber Pakhtunkhwa by population
- Naurang
- Ghoriwala
- Darra Pezu
