= Bhangi Khan Mughal Khel =

Village in Bannu District, Khyber Pakhtunkhwa

Bhangi Khan Mughal Khel بهنګی خان مغل خېل
- Village
- Location in Khyber Pakhtunkhwa
- Coordinates: 32.8727535°N 70.7506831°E
- Country: Pakistan
- District: Bannu
- Tehsil: Bannu
- Named for: Bhangi Khan Mughal Khel

Area
  - Total: 0.57 sq mi (1.48 km^{2})
- Elevation: 1,004 ft (306 m)

Population (2017)
  - Total: around 974
- Time zone: + 5
- Postal code: 28331

Bhangi Khan Mughal Khel (Pashto: بهنګي خان مغل خېل, Urdu: بھنگی خان مغل خیل) is a village in Bannu District in north-western Pakistan. It is located in UC Ghoriwala.

== Overview ==
Bhangi Khan Mughal Khel is a well-educated village situated in the lower plains of Ghoriwala, boasting two primary schools for both boys and girls, as well as a middle school. The village is easily accessible via a road connected to the main Bannu-DIKhan road. The primary tribe inhabiting and establishing the village is Mughal Khel, a subtribe of Yousafzai. The majority of residents in the village hold government positions, engage in business activities, or work as farmers. In comparison to the surrounding region, the village enjoys a commendable level of peace. Due to the numerical advantage of the descendants of the late Shah Nawaz Mughal Khel, the village is sometimes referred to as Shani Kala.
