= Bannu Museum =

- بنوں عجائب ګھر
- Established: 2011; 15 years ago
- Location: Bannu District, Khyber Pakhtunkhwa, Pakistan
- Coordinates: 32°59′11.3″N 70°36′48.6″E
- Type: Archaeology museum
- Owners: Directorate of Archaeology and Museums, Government of Khyber Pakhtunkhwa
- Website: www.kparchaeology.com

Bannu Museum is a museum located in Bannu District, Khyber Pakhtunkhwa, Pakistan. The museum was established by the Directorate of Archaeology and Museums, Khyber Pakhtunkhwa and inaugurated in 2011 by Sayed Aqil Shah, Minister for Sports, Tourism, Archaeology, and Youth Affairs.

The foundation stone of the museum was laid by the-then Chief Minister of Khyber Pakhtunkhwa, Akram Khan Durrani, in 2006.

== Excavation ==
The excavations were undertaken jointly by the University of Peshawar and the Bannu Archaeological Mission including the University of Cambridge, the British Museum, the University College London, and Bryn Mawr College at the sites of Sheri Khan Tarakai, Lewan, and Akra from 1984 to 2001.

== Collection ==
It consists of three galleries, namely the Protohistoric gallery, the Islamic gallery, and Ethnological gallery.

=== Protohistoric gallery ===
It contains artifacts from the Akra and Sheri Khan Tarakai archaeological sites nearby. Human and animal figurines, stone tools, and terracotta seals have been put on display.

=== Islamic gallery ===
This portion contains more than 120 manuscripts of the Quran and books of Hadith with the majority of them being in the Arabic language. Some have been translated into Persian. The Quran manuscripts are dated to the 11th century After Hijra (17th century AD), while the Hadith books were written some time in the 6th century AH (12th century AD).

=== Ethnological gallery ===
It displays the lifestyle and culture of various tribes of the Khyber Pakhtunkhwa province, particularly those which reside in the Bannu region. Everyday items such as jewelry, arms, utensils, musical instruments, and clothes can ben seen on display. They shed a light on the tradition of the region during the 19th and 20th centuries.

== See also ==
- List of museums in Pakistan
