= Kot Qalandar =

- Town and union council
- Location in Khyber Pakhtunkhwa
- Coordinates: 32°54′17.733″N 70°41′39.451″E
- Country: Pakistan
- Region: Khyber-Pakhtunkhwa
- District: Bannu District
- Time zone: UTC+5 (PST)

Kot Qalandar (also written Kot Qalander) is a town and union council in Bannu District of Khyber-Pakhtunkhwa (formerly the North West Frontier province). Its major principal tribe is Hakim Khel branch of Mughal Khel. Mughal Khel are Yousafzai Pashtuns settled in southern parts of District Bannu, with Ghoriwala as their principal center.
