= Subhan Qureshi =

Muhammad Subhan Qureshi
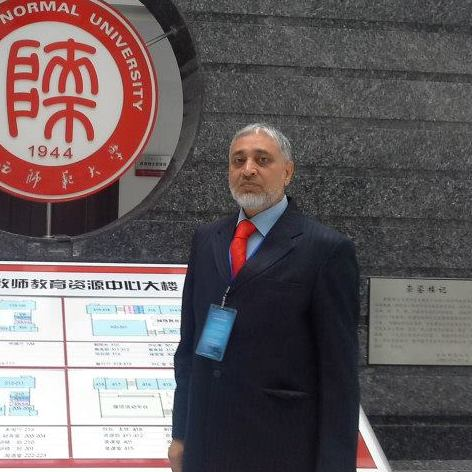
- At Shaanxi Normal University, China (2015)
- Born: 1959 (age 66–67); Bannu, Pakistan
- Education: University of Agriculture, Faisalabad · University of Veterinary and Animal Sciences
- Awards: HEC Best University Teacher Award (2011); Research Productivity Award (2012)
- Scientific career
- Fields: Biology
- Workplaces: University of Agriculture, Peshawar · Dairy Science Park · Charles Sturt University

Muhammad Subhan Qureshi (Pashto/Urdu: محمد سبحان قريشي; born 1959) is a biologist from Khyber Pakhtunkhwa, Pakistan, who is the founder and chief patron of Dairy Science Park. He also worked as a dean at the University of Agriculture, Peshawar, Pakistan, and as adjunct professor at Charles Sturt University, Wagga Wagga, Australia.

== Education ==
Qureshi came from a traditional, intellectual family, and belongs to the Bannu District of Khyber Pakhtunkhwa. After completing his early education in Bannu, Qureshi graduated from the University of Veterinary and Animal Sciences, Lahore in 1982 and then joined the provincial Livestock Department as a veterinary officer in Peshawar. Meanwhile, he joined the University of Agriculture, Faisalabad and completed his MSc and PhD degrees in animal reproduction.

== Career ==
In 1998, in light of his findings under his doctoral thesis on judicial utilization of livestock resources, Qureshi prepared Chief Minister's Livestock Development Plan on advice of the provincial Chief Minister Sardar Mehtab Abbasi. Later in 2003, Qureshi's plan was also approved by the Chief Minister Akram Khan Durrani. In 2005, Qureshi joined the University of Agriculture, Peshawar as a full professor, and he was raised to the status of Dean of the Faculty of Animal Husbandry and Veterinary Sciences. He contributed as Dairy Expert in a Pak-Australia Dairy project. He also worked as Visiting Professor and then adjunct professor at Charles Sturt University, Wagga Wagga, Australia. To introduce business incubation concepts, Qureshi organized a series of conferences on Dairy Science Park. Three international workshops on it were held in 2011, 2013, and 2015, respectively, at the University of Agriculture, Peshawar, each of which was attended by over 500 participants from academia, business and farming community, and development and government organizations of regional countries. The fourth DSP conference was held in November 2017 at Selçuk University in Konya, Turkey, with participation from Konya Metropolitan Municipality and Selçuk University, and in cooperation with 13 other countries. In the fourth DSP conference in Konya, it was announced that two technoparks will be established in Mardan and Quetta, Pakistan, to promote the use of modern technology and develop dairy sector in the region.

Dr Abdul Rahman Ilyas, Advisor to ASRT President, Government of Egypt for Technology Innovations and Collaborations, desired establishing Dairy Science Cairo (DSPC), a joint project of Academy for Scientific Research and Technology (ASRT) and Dairy Science Park Peshawar Pakistan. He is the co-founder of DSP along with Prof M Subhan Qureshi. Dr Amr Faroukh Abdelkhalik Vice President and Mahmoud Sakr President ASRT have endorsed the proposal.

An MoU will be signed shortly between DSP and ASRT for establishing DSPC. Based upon the experience of the DSP under Good Governance and Policy Reforms (2011–2023) suggesting two technoparks under FAO-UN and ITC-UN national consultancies, Dairy Science Park Cairo (DSPC) will be established as an autonomous regulatory, financial and marketing authority, run by a Board of Governors representing all the stakeholders and an Endowment Fund. DSPC will support the public sector organisations as facilitators and the academia in generation of feasible entrepreneurship models across the Livestock-based Value Chain (LBVC). The Major task of DSPC would be generation of decent employment and exportable hygienic/Halal certified food and biotech products.

== Publications ==
- Qureshi, M. Subhan (1992). "Comparative efficiency of rectal palpation and milk progesterone profiles in diagnosing ovarian contents in buffaloes" (PDF). Pakistan Journal of Agricultural Research. 13 (2). Pakistan Agricultural Research Council: 196–200.
- Qureshi, M. Subhan (1995). "Conventional buffalo farming system in NWFP Pakistan" (PDF). Buffalo Bulletin. 14 (2). International Buffalo Information Center, Kasetsart University: 38–41.
- Qureshi, M. Subhan (2000). "Milk progesterone profiles in various reproductive states in dairy buffaloes under field conditions". Proceedings of the National Science Council, Republic of China. Part B, Life Sciences. 24 (2). Ministry of Science and Technology of the Republic of China: 70–75. PMID 10809083.
- Qureshi, M. Subhan (2002). "Reproduction-nutrition relationship in dairy buffaloes. I. Effect of intake of protein, energy and blood metabolites levels" (PDF). Asian-Australasian Journal of Animal Sciences. 15 (3). Asian-Australasian Association of Animal Production Societies: 330–339. doi:10.5713/ajas.2002.330.
- Qureshi, M. Subhan (2008). "Interaction of calf suckling, use of oxytocin and milk yield with reproductive performance of dairy buffaloes". Animal Reproduction Science. 106 (3). Elsevier: 380–392. doi:10.1016/j.anireprosci.2007.05.019. PMID 17611053.
- Qureshi, M. Subhan (2010). "Pregnancy depresses milk yield in Dairy Buffaloes". Italian Journal of Animal Science. 6 (2s). Animal Science and Production Association: 1290–1293. doi:10.4081/ijas.2007.s2.1290.
- Qureshi, M. Subhan (2013). "Effect of extenders, postdilution intervals, and seasons on semen quality in dairy goats" (PDF). Turkish Journal of Veterinary & Animal Sciences. 37. Scientific and Technological Research Council of Turkey: 147–152. doi:10.3906/vet-1110-24.
- Qureshi, M. Subhan (2013). "Scope for biological sensing technologies in meat production and export in northern Pakistan". IOP Conference Series: Materials Science and Engineering. 51 (1) 012013. IOP Publishing. Bibcode:2013MS&E...51a2013Q. doi:10.1088/1757-899X/51/1/012013.
- Qureshi MS, 2019. FAO KP Livestock Action Plan on Good Governance through Livestock Technopark Peshawar – 2019.
- Qureshi MS, 2022. Baluchistan Livestock Breeding Policy 2022 – M Subhan Qureshi – ITC-UN
- FAO 2021. Call for best practices in transforming food systems for affordable healthy diets and addressing key drivers of food insecurity and malnutrition

== See also ==
- Dairy Science Park
