= Ziad Durrani =

Pakistani politician

Ziad Akram Durrani MNA
- زیاد اکرم درانی

Member of the Provincial Assembly of North-West Frontier Province
- In office February 2008 – June 2012
- Constituency: PK-70 (Bannu)

Member of the National Assembly of Pakistan
- In office April 2007 – October 2007
- Constituency: Constituency NA-26 (Bannu)

Personal details
- Born: 13 February 1982 Bannu, NWFP, Pakistan (Now, KPK, Pakistan)
- Died: 21 June 2012 (aged 30) Peshawar, KPK, Pakistan
- Parent: Akram Khan Durrani (father)

Ziad Akram Durrani (Urdu: زیاد اکرم درانی, Pashto: زیاد اکرم دراني; 13 February 1982 – 21 June 2012) was a Pakistani politician who had been a member of the Provincial Assembly of North-West Frontier Province from February 2008 to June 2012 from PK-70 (Bannu) and member of the National Assembly of Pakistan from April 2007 to October 2007 from NA-26 (Bannu).

== Early life and education ==
He was born on 13 February 1982 to Akram Khan Durrani.

He graduated from Islamia College Peshawar and had a degree of Bachelor of Arts. He received a degree of Bachelor of Laws from the Law College, University of Peshawar.

== Political career ==
He was elected to the National Assembly of Pakistan as a candidate of Muttahida Majlis-e-Amal (MMA) from Constituency NA-26 (Bannu) in the by-polls held in March 2007.

He was elected to the Provincial Assembly of North-West Frontier Province as a candidate of MMA from Constituency PF-70 (Bannu) in the 2008 Pakistani general election.

He died on 21 June 2012 in Peshawar due to Cardiac Arrest.
