= Ghoriwala =

Ghoriwala غوري والا غوریوالہ
- Town and union council
- Ghoriwala
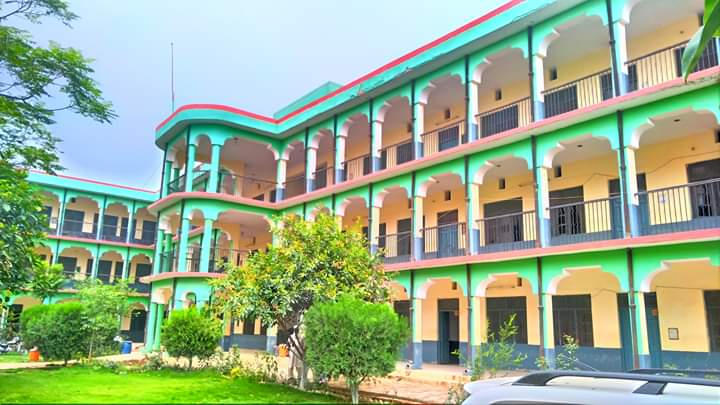
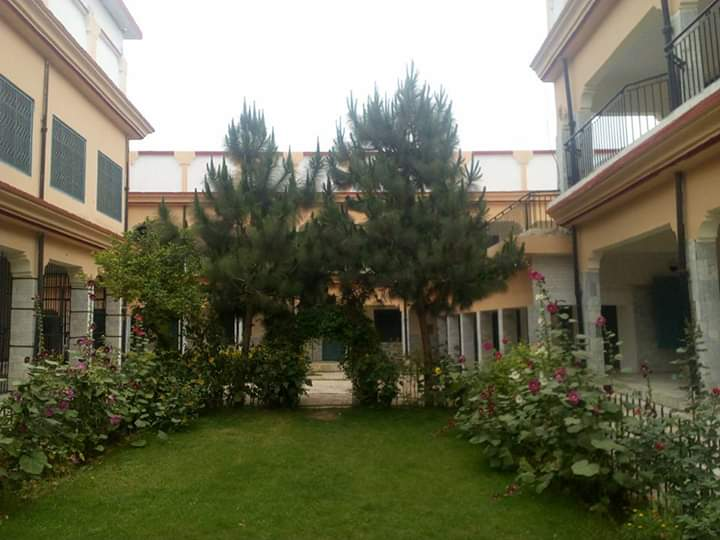
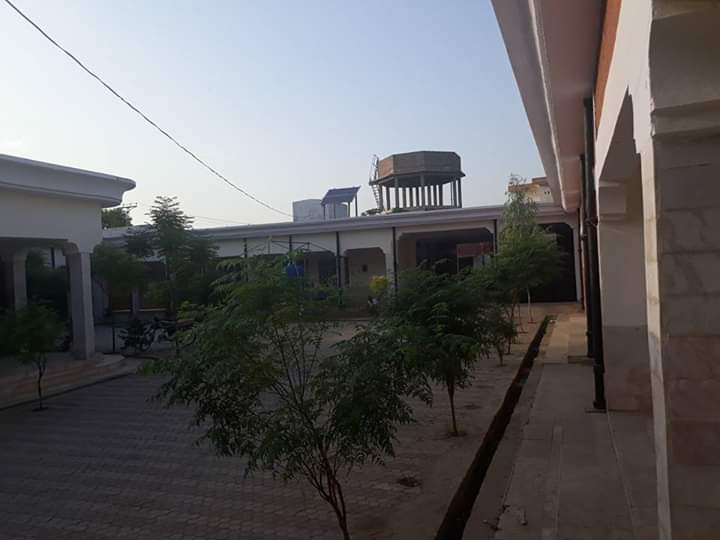
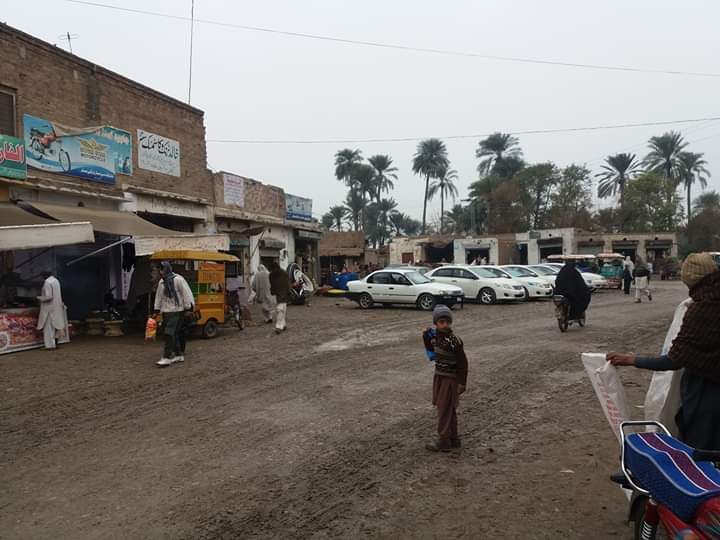
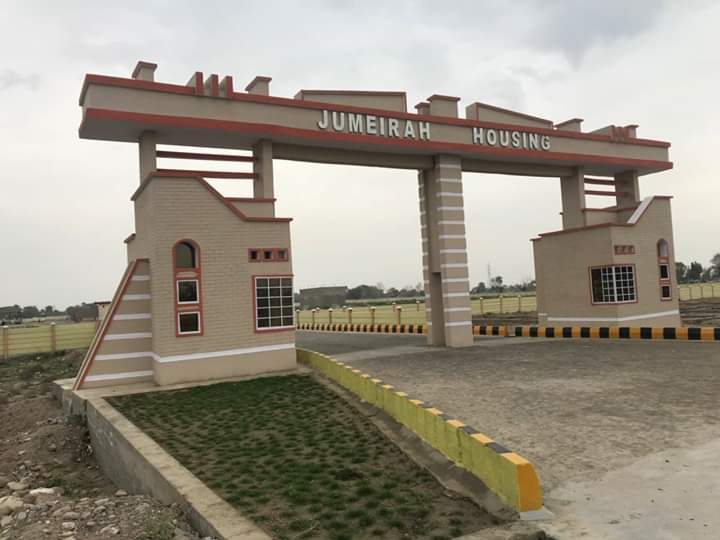
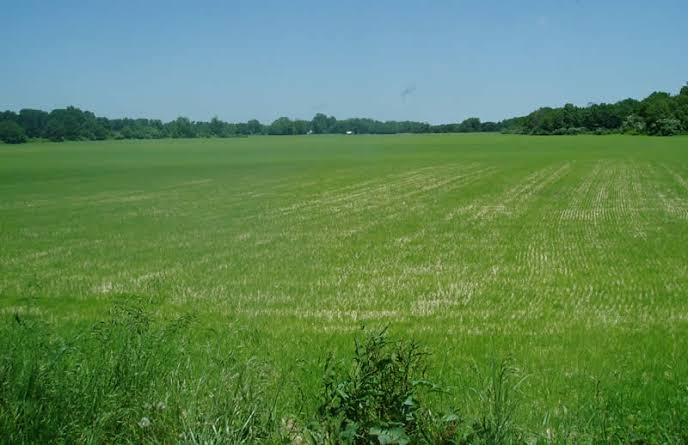
- Top left to right: Government High School Ghoriwala, Government Degree College Ghoriwala, RHC Hospital Ghoriwala, Jumeirah Housing Society, Kacha Bachak Road Intersection, and Mughal Khel Playground.

- Flag Coat of arms

- Location within Khyber Pakhtunkhwa Location within Pakistan
- Coordinates: 32°54′20″N 70°43′40″E
- Country: Pakistan
- Province: Khyber Pakhtunkhwa
- District: Bannu
- Tehsil: Bannu
- Named for: Muhammad of Ghor

Government
  - Type: Union Council
  - Nazim: Umar Khayyam Khan
- Elevation: 295 m (968 ft)

Population (2017) Summary: The source provides population and household data for Sharqi QH and Ghoriwala PC, which are the areas that come under the jurisdiction of the Ghoriwala UC.
  - Total: 154,773
- Time zone: UTC+5 (PST)
- Postal Code of Pakistan: 28330
- Area code: 928
- Languages: Pashto
- Website: bannu.kp.gov.pk

Ghoriwala (Pashto: غوري واله, romanized: ġwary wala, pronounced [/ɣoˈri wɑlə/] pronounce; Urdu: غوریوالہ, romanized: Ghuriwala, pronounced [/ɣoːriː wɑːlə/] pronounce) also called Ghariwola (Pashto: غاريوله, romanized: Gariwola, pronounced [/ɣɑːrjoːla/] pronounce) is a town and union council in Bannu District of Khyber-Pakhtunkhwa. Its history and name is sometimes linked with the famous Muslim King Sultan Muhammad Ghori. The area is mostly inhabited by Mughal Khel branch of Yousafzai Pashtuns.

== History ==
=== First settlement ===
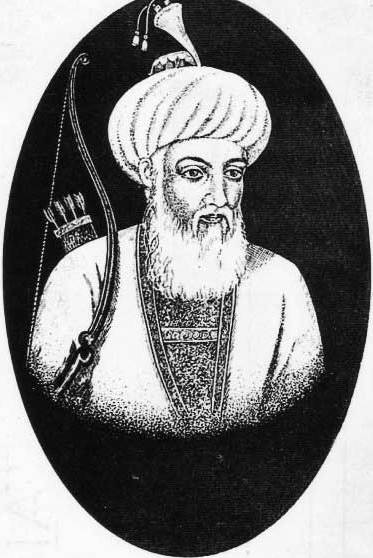
Muhammad of Ghor, after whom the town is named.

Ghoriwala is known for its historical significance as it is believed to be the location where the Ghurid ruler Muhammad of Ghor set up camp during his invasions of India. The town's name "Ghoriwala" means "place of Ghori". Local legend states that Sultan Ghori dug a well during his stay in the area, and that the Mangal and Hani tribes also accompanied him and settled in the vicinity. Although, many of the historical information and legends could be inaccurate and subject to verification, the Ghorid Empire did leave significant impact on the subcontinent.

=== Arrival of Mughal Khel ===
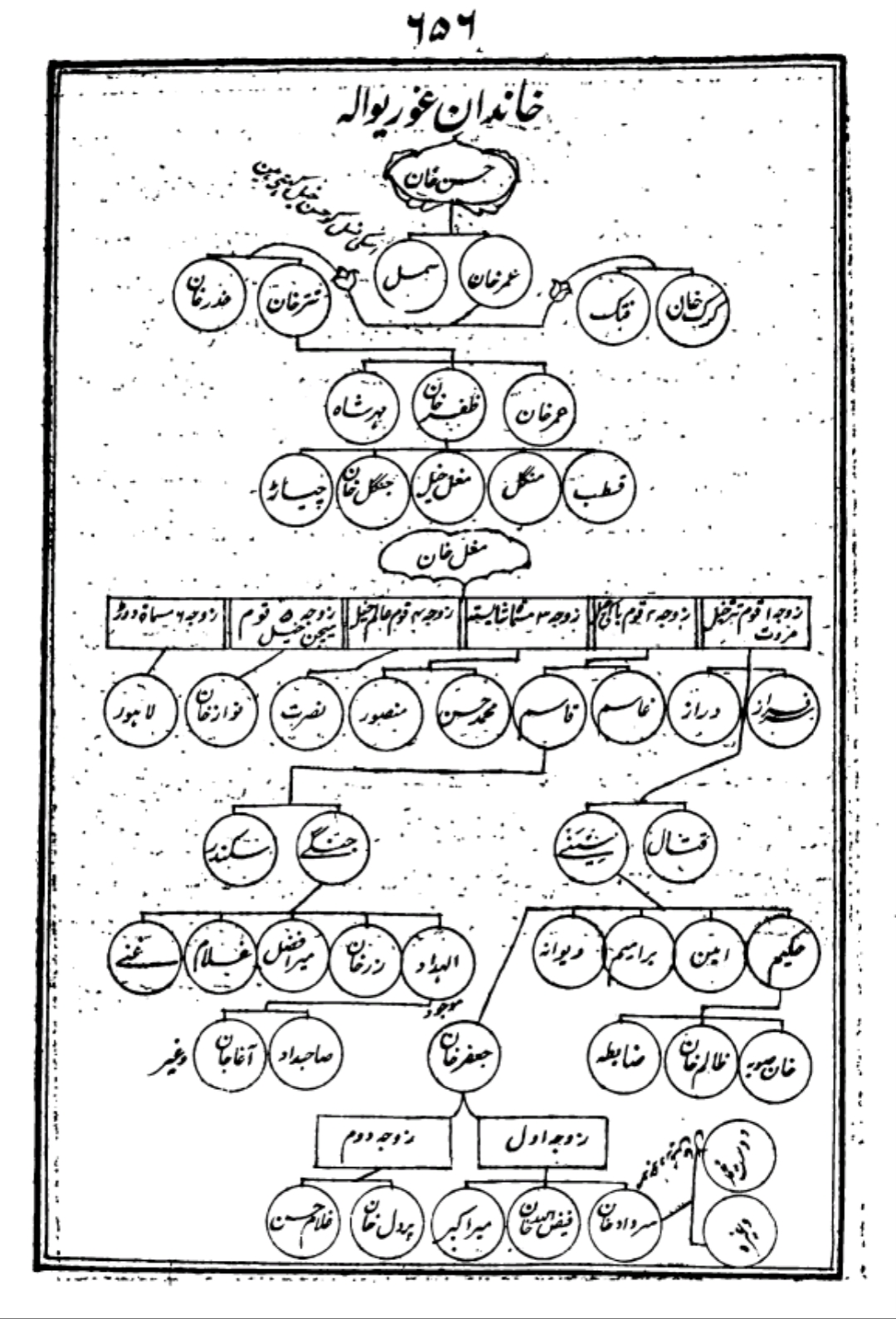
Lineage of Mughal Khel from Hassan Khan

The Mughal Khel of Ghoriwala is a tribe of Yusufzai origin who settled in the area in 17th century during the decline of the Mughal Empire. They were able to establish themselves in the area through their military prowess and strategic alliances with other groups. Despite the passage of time, the Mughal Khel have managed to preserve their identity, culture, and customs. They are a prime example of how different bands of adventurers were able to establish themselves in unoccupied lands during the disruption and decay of the Mughal Empire.

== Geography ==
=== Climate ===
Ghoriwala falls under the Köppen climate classification of hot desert climate (BWh). This type of climate is characterized by very hot temperatures throughout the year and low amounts of precipitation. There is little variation in temperature between seasons, and there may be occasional dust storms due to the dry conditions. In this region, temperatures can reach over 40 °C (104 °F) during the summer months, while precipitation is typically less than 100mm per year.

Climate data for Ghoriwala
Month	Jan	Feb	Mar	Apr	May	Jun	Jul	Aug	Sep	Oct	Nov	Dec	Year
Mean daily maximum °C (°F)	17.2 (63.0)	20.0 (68.0)	25.4 (77.7)	32.7 (90.9)	39.0 (102.2)	42.0 (107.6)	40.4 (104.7)	38.4 (101.1)	36.5 (97.7)	32.5 (90.5)	25.5 (77.9)	18.7 (65.7)	30.7 (87.3)
Daily mean °C (°F)	10.2 (50.4)	13.0 (55.4)	18.9 (66.0)	25.6 (78.1)	32.2 (90.0)	36.4 (97.5)	34.3 (93.7)	32.6 (90.7)	29.3 (84.7)	23.2 (73.8)	15.8 (60.4)	10.6 (51.1)	23.5 (74.3)
Mean daily minimum °C (°F)	3.2 (37.8)	6.1 (43.0)	12.4 (54.3)	19.5 (67.1)	25.5 (77.9)	29.9 (85.8)	28.3 (82.9)	26.7 (80.1)	22.0 (71.6)	16.0 (60.8)	9.2 (48.6)	4.6 (40.3)	17.0 (62.5)
Average precipitation mm (inches)	52 (2.0)	61 (2.4)	50 (2.0)	23 (0.9)	9 (0.4)	5 (0.2)	34 (1.3)	23 (0.9)	7 (0.3)	3 (0.1)	11 (0.4)	31 (1.2)	309 (12.1)
Source 1: Worldclimate
Source 2: Climate-Data.org

== Bani Gul City ==
In a recent development, the provincial government of KP has approved plans to establish a new city in the Ghoriwala between Bannu and Lakki Marwat districts. The project was approved in response to the growing residential and other problems faced by over 1.6 million residents of Bannu. The new city will be built on 10,000 kanals of land in Ghoriwala, near the China-Pakistan Economic Corridor (CPEC) route and the approved Peshawar–Dera Ismail Khan motorway.

The construction of Banni Gul City is expected to bring significant changes to the region of Ghoriwala. The project will provide new job opportunities and economic growth for the local population as it will require a workforce for the construction and maintenance of the city. The presence of a new city in the area is also expected to attract businesses and investments, leading to further economic development.

The new city will also provide much-needed housing and other facilities such as healthcare, education, sports and recreation, and uninterrupted power and gas supply to the residents. It will improve the overall standard of living in the region and help to alleviate the housing and other problems faced by the residents of Bannu.

In addition, the location of Banni Gul City, near the China-Pakistan Economic Corridor (CPEC) route and the motorway, makes it a strategic location for trade and transportation. This can open up new opportunities for trade and tourism in the region. The Urban Areas Development Authority has been tasked with executing the project.

== Neighborhoods ==
Following are the villages located within Ghoriwala:

- Kot Mehtar
- Kot Qalander
- Kot Pasha
- Amin Mughal Khel
- Bhangi Khan Mughal Khel
- Bharati Michen Khel
- Taji Kula
- Karak Painda Khel
- Ghulam Mughal Khel
- Shigi Michen Khel
- Ibrahim Mughal Khel
- Khanzad Mughal Khel
- Nar Jaffar Khan
- Abdullah Mughal Khel
- Kotka Samand Khel
- Jangi Mughal Khel
- Shamshi Khel
- Toro Balo Michen Khel
- Hassan Khel Jaffar Khan
- Kotka Arsala Khan
- Momen Mughal Khel
- Kotka Zarwali Khan

== Major tribes ==
Following are the Major Tribes settled in Ghoriwala:

Pashtun Tribes:Other Tribes:
- Mughal Khel
  - Qasim Khel
  - Jafar Khel
  - Hakim Khel
  - Muhammad Hassan Khel
- Gherat Khel
- Michen Khel
- Babul khel (Miri)
- Khojari
- Jhando Khel
- Marwat
- Wazir
- Kharoti
- Sayyid
- Bukhari
- Qureishi
- Awan
- Jutt
- Kutanree (Kutan)

== Notable people ==
- Syed Naseeb Ali Shah, Former Member of the National Assembly of Pakistan
- Abdur Rashid, Former Field Hockey Player
- Brig. Abdul Hamid, Former Field Hockey Player and Ex Secretary General Pakistan Hockey Federation
- Jafar Khan Yousafzai, Former Tribal Elder and Raes of Ghoriwala, Nar Jaffar Khan, Ismail Khel and Hassan Khel Jafar Khan Tappa
- Naseem Ali Shah, Member of the National Assembly of Pakistan

== See also ==
- Bannu
- Yousafzai
- Ghoriwala railway station
- Sultan Muhammad Ghori
- Gadezai, Buner
- Peshawar-Dera Ismail Khan Motorway
- Union Councils of District Bannu
