= Khanzad Mughal Khel =

Tribal Village in Khyber Pakhtunkhwa

Khanzad Mughal Khel خانزاد مغل خیل
- Village
- Location in Khyber Pakhtunkhwa
- Coordinates: 32.8768300°N 70.7378635°E
- Country: Pakistan
- District: Bannu
- Tehsil: Bannu

Population
  - Total: 950
  - Ethnicities: Pashtun
- Time zone: + 5

Khanzad Mughal Khel is a village in Bannu District in north-western Pakistan. It is located in UC Ghoriwala.
