= Nasim Ali Shah =

Pakistani politician

- نسیم علی شاہ

Member of the National Assembly of Pakistan
- Incumbent
- Assumed office 29 February 2024
- Constituency: NA-39 Bannu

Personal details
- Party: PTI (2018–present)
- Parent: Syed Nasib Ali Shah
- Occupation: Politician

Nasim Ali Shah is a Pakistani politician and Islamic scholar, who was elected a member of the National Assembly of Pakistan in 2024 Pakistani general election.

He is also a member of Council of Islamic Ideology.

== Political career ==
Shah, son of former politician Nasib Ali Shah, entered politics by contesting the 2013 Pakistani general elections from NA-26 Bannu as an independent candidate, but was unsuccessful. He received votes and was defeated by Akram Khan Durrani, a candidate of Jamiat Ulema-e-Islam (F) (JUI(F)).

He joined the Pakistan Tehreek-e-Insaf (PTI) party in 2018. He contested a by-election as a PTI candidate from NA-35 Bannu the same year, but was unsuccessful. He received 37,622 votes and was defeated by Zahid Akram Durrani, a candidate of Muttahida Majlis-e-Amal (MMA).

He was elected to the National Assembly in the 2024 Pakistani general election from NA-39 Bannu with 147,087 votes as a PTI-affiliated independent. He defeated Zahid Akram Durrani, who was a JUI-F candidate. His election marked a significant moment, becoming the first non-JUI politician to represent Bannu since 1993.
