= Nar =

Nar or NAR may refer to:

== Music ==
- Nar (album) by Sahrawi musician Nayim Alal
- Nar, album by Mercan Dede
- New Alliance Records, an American punk, spoken word, music-label, active from 1980 to 1998
- NAR International, an Italian record label founded in 1980

== Places ==
=== Asia ===
- Nar, Nepal, a village development committee in Manang District in the Gandaki Zone of northern Nepal
- Nar Jaffar Khan, a town and union council in Bannu District of Khyber-Pakhtunkhwa, Pakistan
- Nar Township, Samzhubzê District, Tibet
- Nar, Jammu and Kashmir, a small village in Kotli district, Pakistan-controlled Azad Kashmir

=== Europe ===
- När, a village on Gotland, Sweden
- River Nar, a river in the United Kingdom, and a tributary of the River Great Ouse
- Nar, North Ossetia–Alania, a village in North Ossetia–Alania, Russia

== Political organisations ==
- National Alliance for Reconstruction, a political party in Trinidad and Tobago
- New Left Current or NAR, a political party in Greece
- Nouvelle Action Royaliste, a political party in France
- Nuclei Armati Rivoluzionari, an Italian right-wing terrorist group

== Professional bodies ==
- National Association of Racing, governs horse racing tracks in Japan
- National Association of Realtors, a North American real estate agent association
- National Association of Rocketry, governs model rocketry in the United States

== Languages ==
- Nar, a dialect of the Nar Phu language of Nepal
- Nar, a dialect of the Sar language of Chad
- nar, the ISO 639-3 code for the Guta language of Nigeria

== Religion and mythology ==
- Nar, a dwarf of Norse mythology
- Native American religions, indigenous American religion
- New Apostolic Reformation, a dominionist Christian religious movement

== Technology ==
- Nar Mobile, a mobile telecommunications company, located in Baku, Azerbaijan

== Other uses ==
- North American Review, a literary magazine founded in 1815
- Northern Alberta Railways, a former Canadian railway
- Nucleic Acids Research, a biology journal
- Nursing Assistants-Registered, a medical certification

== See also ==
- NARS (disambiguation)
