= Koti Sadat =

Coordinates: 33°00′N 70°40′E

- Town and union council
- Interactive map of Koti Sadat
- Country: Pakistan
- Region: Khyber-Pakhtunkhwa
- District: Bannu District
- Time zone: UTC+5 (PST)

Koti Sadat is a town and union council in Bannu District of Khyber-Pakhtunkhwa (formerly the North West Frontier province).
