= Hind Khel Wazir =

Coordinates: 32°47′38″N 70°30′29″E

- Town and union council
- Interactive map of Hind Khel Wazir
- Country: Pakistan
- Province: Khyber Pakhtunkhwa
- District: Bannu District
- Time zone: UTC+5 (PST)

Hind Khel Wazir or Hindi Khel is a town and union council of Bannu District in Khyber Pakhtunkhwa province of Pakistan. It is located at 32°47'38N 70°30'29E and has an altitude of 327 metres (1076 feet).
