= Bannu Archaeological Project =

Bannu Archeological Project
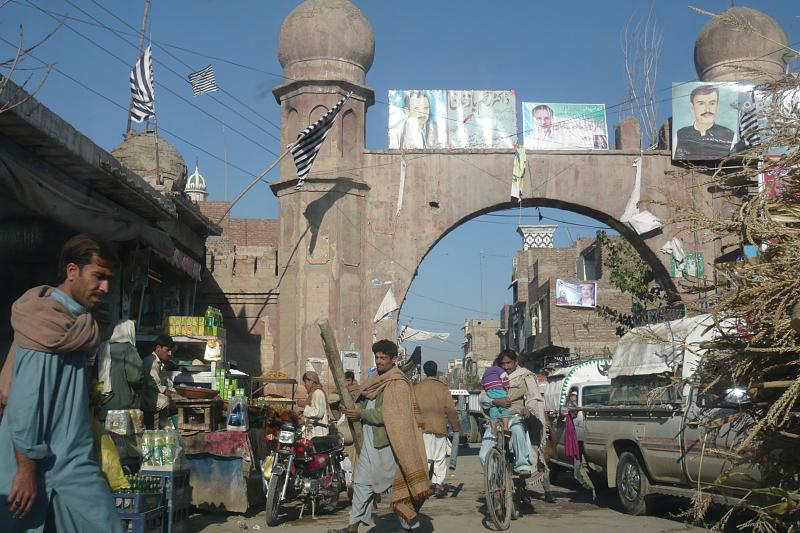
- Urban Bannu, Pakistan
- Type: Settlement
- Periods: Neolithic to Kot Diji Phase
- Location: Bannu, Khyber Pakhtunkhwa, Pakistan
- Region: Khyber Pakhtunkhwa

Site notes
- Excavation dates: 1984 - 2020
- Public access: Yes (Collections accessible at the Ashmolean Museum of Oxford and the British Museum)

The Bannu Archeological Project is a joint initiative focused on the archeological research efforts of a series of excavation sites across Bannu in Pakistan's Khyber Pakhtunkhwa province. Work on the project began in the region with archaeological surveys in 1984 and with excavation efforts commencing in 1995 and coming to a close in 2020

== Overview ==
Surveying was conducted using EDM (Electronic Distance Measurer) technology which allowed for such an extensive landscape to be observed. Even with some sites now sitting under populated villages, to this day, the excavation site in rural Bannu is of great significance to Pakistan's archeological landscape given its position in shedding light on various civilizations, cultures, and peoples dating back to the some of earliest village settlements in the region. The Bannu Archeological Project stands as the most recent project of the various excavations surrounding the Bannu Basin as well as the region's widely deemed historic capital of Akra.

=== Collaborative nature of the project and affiliated institutions ===
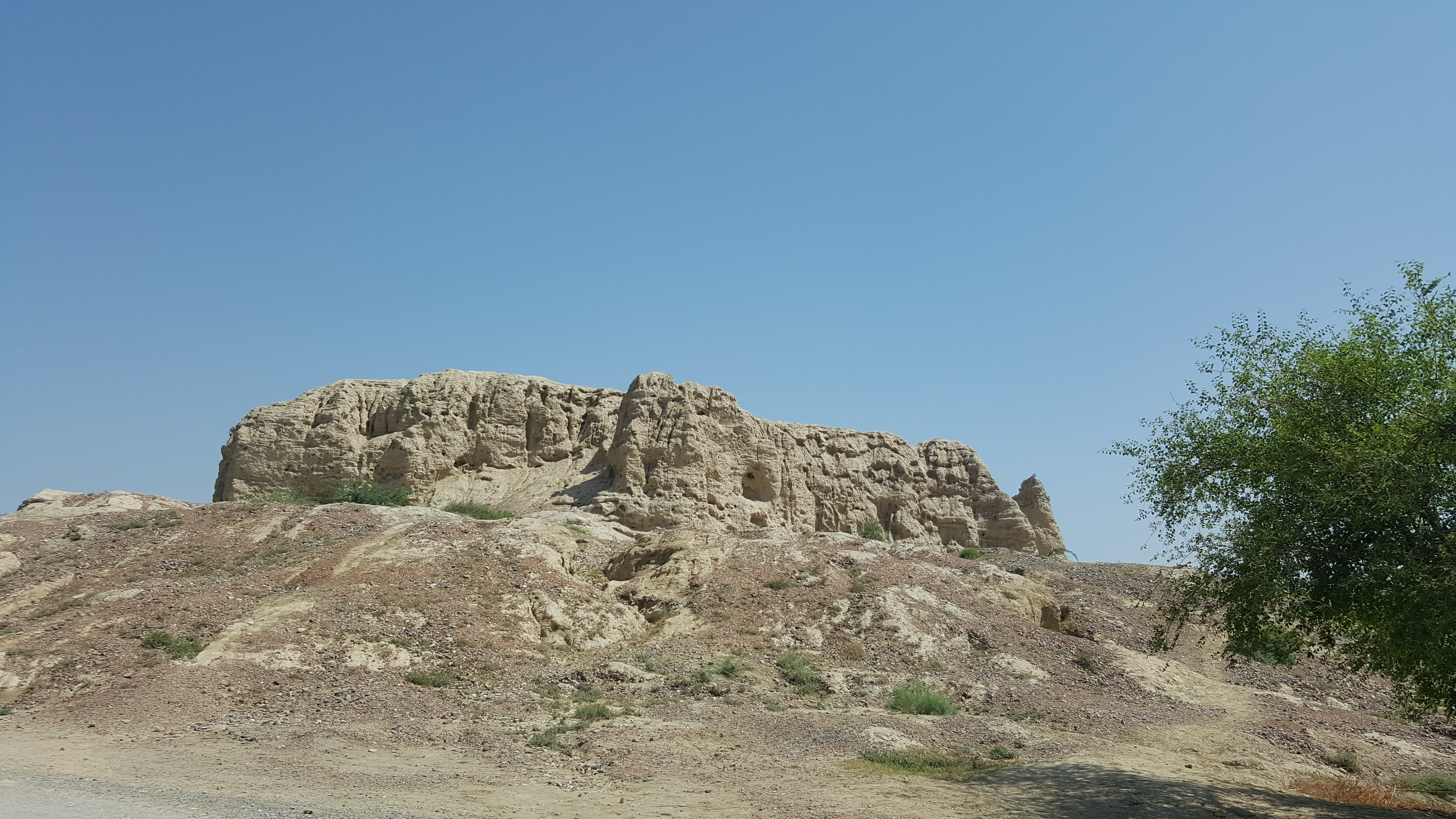
Akra Mound in Bannu, Pakistan

Research efforts consist of collaborative procedures between University of Cambridge, University College London, University of Peshawar, Bryn Mawr College, University College London, along with the British Museum.

=== Cultural phases across sites ===
While Ter Khala Deri and Akra represent the most important sites along with the Neolithic Sheri Khan Tarakai site wherein efforts have been primarily focused as of recent. Excavators have divided the site into three cultural phases with the most recent being dubbed the Kot Diji Phase. Researchers in the Sheri Khan Taraki site initially found "distinctive hand-made ceramic vessels decorated with a combination of geometric and zoomorphic motifs" representing the earliest cultural phase, while a later discovery of ceramic vessels with "distinctive polychrome decoration" in sites in Lewan of the overarching Bannu region citing these findings as hailing from the Sheri Khan Tarakai Phase. The civilization at Sheri Khan Tarakai was understood by researchers as a peoples who heavily relied on ceramics as opposed to metals and who grew grains– particularly wheat and barley– while herding sheep, goats and cattle. The discovery of discrete deposits in Lak Largai, however, revealed that the material of the more recent discovery represented a distinct cultural phase from the previous. This division of the excavation sites into distinct phases has also been underscored by discoveries of similar ceramic material used to make pottery, lithics, and terracotta figures in surrounding areas of Girdai, Her Khala Sheri, Lewan, and Islam Chowki.

=== Project discoveries ===
Parallels have been drawn between ceramic techniques and the decorative assemblage seen from the Bannu Archeological Project and those from other sites in South Asia. According to researchers, ceramics found in some sites are said to be almost identical those found in other parts of the Gomal Plain– particularly at the Jhandi Babar A and Gulgai Kot Archeological sites. Reflecting a long-standing tradition of passing down ceramic assemblage techniques, "lithic assemblage from Sheri Khan Tarakai is typologically and technologically similar to the assemblages currently seen in villages in northern Baluchistan". The Akra and Ter Kala Deri sites of the Bannu Archeological Project saw the discovery of advanced pottery of a unique ceramic element (as compared to surrounding regions) along with low standing mound structures and relatively intact stratified deposits; this coincided with the discovery of iron tools and etched beads with no traces of teracotta figures or coins– both of which were found in other sites of the Bannu Archeological Project. In addition, the village site located on the righthand bank of the Lohra Nullah is widely seen by researchers the first "city" in Akra.

=== Artifacts and materials ===
Aside from ceramic materials, biological remains were also found in the form of "wood charcoals, charred grains, seeds and fruits, and zooarchaeological remains of mammals, birds, reptiles, amphibians, fish and molluscs".

=== Dating techniques and chronology ===
Employing absolute and relative dating techniques, researchers involved with the Bannu Archeological Project have been able to illustrate a general sense of chronology. Analysis of multiple samples found at the Sheri Khan Tarakai site reveal their origin to be between the fifth and fourth millennium BC. Analysis of coin samples from the Ter Kala Deri site, however, reveal dates from the first millennium BC. In total, 21 radiocarbon analyses were conducted from Sheri Khan Tarakai site in the Bannu Archeological Project over the course of its excavation. Such samples consisted mostly of wood charcoal samples found in trenches gathered from the site; these analyses have collectively solidified the site's reputation as the second best dated early village site in South Asia. This is of particular significance given that South Asia is widely seen as a region in which radiocarbon dating methods are generally met with skepticism given their historic variability in dating sites from the region.

=== Collections and public displays ===
Most collections from the site which are publicly accessible can be found in either the Ashmolean Museum of Oxford or the British Museum; of these collections, the most prominent items are ancient coins, seals, and terracotta figures from the region across various time periods.
