= Ghoriwala railway station =

Railway station in Pakistan

Ghoriwala railway station غوریوالہ ریلوے اسٹیشن

General information
- Coordinates: 32.898394°N 70.709660°E
- Owner: Ministry of Railways
- Line: Bannu–Tank Branch Line

Other information
- Status: Closed
- Station code: GWR
Location

Ghoriwala railway station (Urdu: غوری والا ریلوے اسٹیشن) is located on Bannu-Tank line in Ghoriwala, Bannu.

== See also ==
- List of railway stations in Pakistan
- Ghoriwala
- Pakistan Railways
