= Nezam Dherma Khel =

- Town and union council
- Country: Pakistan
- Province: Khyber Pakhtunkhwa
- District: Bannu District
- Time zone: UTC+5 (PST)

Nezam Dherma Khel is a town and union council of Bannu District in Khyber Pakhtunkhwa province of Pakistan.
