= Mumbati Barakzai =

Mumbathi Barakzai
- Town and union council
- Country: Pakistan
- Province: Khyber Pakhtunkhwa
- District: Bannu District
- Time zone: UTC+5 (PST)

Mumbathi Barakzai is a town and union council of Bannu District in Khyber Pakhtunkhwa province of Pakistan. Malik Salim Ur Rehman, nephew of the famous businessman, land-holder, and poet Noor Wali Jan Saqib (a.k.a. Lolai Ustad), is one of the prominent personalities in politics from Mumbati Barakzai.
