= Lalozai =

Coordinates: 33°1′17″N 70°36′36″E

- Town and union council
- Interactive map of Lalozai
- Country: Pakistan
- Province: Khyber Pakhtunkhwa
- District: Bannu District
- Time zone: UTC+5 (PST)

Lalozai is a town and union council of Bannu District in Khyber Pakhtunkhwa province of Pakistan. It is located at 33°1'17N 70°36'5E and has an altitude of 372 metres (1223).
