= Bannu Medical College =

Medical school in Bannu, Pakistan

Bannu Medical College بنوں طبی کالج
- Motto: Arabic: عِلماً نَافِعاً - رِزْقاً طَيِّباً - شِفَآءً كَامِلاً
- Motto in English: Useful knowledge - good sustenance - complete recovery
- Type: Public Government institute
- Established: 2006
- Parent institution: Khyber Medical University
- Affiliations: KMU, PMDC, CPSP, PNC, HEC
- Dean: Dr. Shabbir Hussain
- Academic staff: 80
- Undergraduates: 700
- Location: Bannu, Pakistan; 33°1′25.77″N 70°42′26.35″E
- Campus: Urban, 75 acres (30 ha)
- Language: English
Colours
- Website: www.bmckp.edu.pk

Bannu Medical College (BMC) (Urdu: بنوں طبی کالج, Pashto: د بنو طب پوهنځی) is a public medical institute located in Bannu, Khyber Pakhtunkhwa, Pakistan. It is one of several medical colleges affiliated with the Khyber Medical University and enrolls 100 students each year. BMC is recognized by the Pakistan Medical and Dental Council and is listed in the World Directory of Medical Colleges.

== History ==
BMC was established in August 2006 by former Khyber Pakhtunkhwa Chief Minister Akram Khan Durrani and opened that December. In 2009, a new campus in Bannu Township was approved and formal work started in 2013. Though the 600 kanal campus was intended to be completed by 2016, there were delays due to shortage of funds, with the construction estimated to cost Rs627 million. The temporary location for the college was in Bannu City in the Government High School No. 3 building. Because the Bannu City campus did not have residence halls, students had to find their own accommodation. Construction finished and the permanent campus in Bannu Township was opened in March 2021.

== Programs ==
=== Basic Sciences ===
- Anatomy
- Biochemistry
- Dentistry
- Forensic Medicine
- Pathology
- Pharmacology
- Psychiatry
- Community Medicine

=== Clinical sciences ===
- General Medicine
- Paediatrics
- Pulmonology
- Cardiology
- Psychiatry
- General Surgery
- Orthopaedic Surgery
- Paediatric Surgery
- Neurosurgery
- Radiology
- Gynaecology
- Ears, Nose, Throat (ENT)
- Ophthalmology
- Dentistry

== Affiliated hospitals ==
The 600-bed Khalifa Gul Nawaz Teaching Hospital, 244-bed District Headquarters (DHQ) Hospital, and the 130-bed Women and Children's Hospital are associated with the college. DHQ is recognized by the Pakistan Nursing Council.

== Student life ==
Student groups annually arrange college funfairs and partake in festivities such as Urdu Day, Pashto Day, English Day, and Sports Day. Medical activities and photography seminars are also available. The college publishes Baraan, previously Taryaaq, a magazine that is released annually.
