= Sheri Khan Tarakai =

Ancient settlement in Khyber Pakhtunkhwa, Pakistan

- Location within Pakistan
- 32.844444°N 70.468889°E
- Location: Pakistan
- Region: Khyber Pakhtunkhwa

Sheri Khan Tarakai is an ancient settlement site located in the Bannu District of Khyber-Pakhtunkhwa province, Pakistan. It was occupied from approximately 5000 BC to 2500 BC.

Excavations have shown that the settlement at Sheri Khan Tarakai was a small village, populated at any one time by perhaps a few hundred people who lived in mud-walled houses, some of which had stone foundations and flat roofs made of wattle and daub. It is unlikely that the whole area of the identified site was occupied at one time.

== Location ==
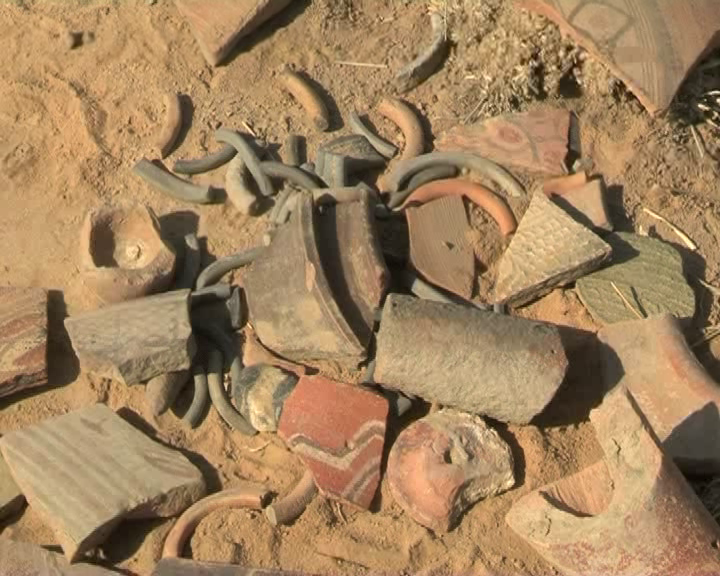
Rehman Dheri ceramics at the site (Bannu Basin)

Sheri Khan Tarakai is located 17 km southwest of Bannu City. Bannu District makes up a part of the topographic region known as the Bannu basin, which sits adjacent to the hills of Afghanistan and Waziristan to the west and the Indus River floodplain on the east. Rehman Dheri, a contemporary site, is located about 100 km to the south, also in Khyber-Pakhtunkhwa province.

== Excavations ==
The site of Sheri Khan Tarakai was discovered in 1985 by members of the Bannu Archaeological Project, and it is the oldest known village settlement in the Bannu region. Archaeological excavations were carried out at the site for five seasons between 1986 and 1990.

=== Bannu Archaeological Project ===
The Bannu Archaeological Project was a collaboration involving the Pakistan Heritage Society, University College London, The British Museum, Bryn Mawr College and the University of Cambridge. The Project explored in Bannu District, North-West Frontier Province, Pakistan between 1985 and 2001. Numerous Early Historic and Later Prehistoric sites were discovered.

The Project established that Sheri Khan Tarakai is actually the second oldest village farming settlement in south Asia.

==== Lewan settlement ====
Between 1995 and 2001, the project also explored the Chalcolithic site of Lewan, Bannu. This site was occupied in both the Tochi-Gomal and Kot Diji phases, so it's important for understanding the rise of complex societies in the NWFP in late prehistory.

Both the radiocarbon chronology and the material assemblage indicate that Lewan was continuously occupied throughout the fourth and third millennia (4000-2000 BC). The range of industrial activities recorded here suggests that it was a village settlement comparable to those at Tarakai Qila, Tarakai Ghundai and Islam Chowki - all in Bannu Basin area.

There's evidence of bead manufacture, and pottery production at the site—similar to all other sites of this period in the Bannu basin.

==== Akra, Bannu ====
The Early Historic site of Akra, Bannu was also explored. The site covers some 80 hectares and is the largest archaeological site in the Bannu area. The site was first occupied around 2000 BC, and may have continued to be inhabited until the 11th century AD.

== Life at Sheri Khan Tarakai ==
The past inhabitants of the village used a variety of utilitarian pottery vessels that were decorated with a range of geometric and figurative motifs, and it is likely that these vessels were being made from raw materials collected close to the site. The stone tools (lithic artefacts) that were used at the settlement were also produced from raw materials sourced close by, and the majority of small-find objects, which include a diverse range of terracotta human figurines, were predominantly made from locally available materials. The range of finished pottery vessels, lithic tools and small finds, and the associated production debris that was discovered, indicate the range of craft activities being carried out on-site, including pottery firing, bone working, lithic flaking, stone grinding and bead drilling. The diverse range of terracotta figurines and the motifs depicted on many of the ceramic vessels suggest that the lives of the inhabitants were enlivened by a rich iconographic tradition.

The inhabitants of Sheri Khan Tarakai deployed a range of subsistence strategies, including the cultivation of barley and wheat, the management of domestic sheep, goat, and cattle, the collection of a range of wild plant and wood species, and the hunting of a wide variety of wild animals. The abundance of grinding artifacts at the site and the presence of rachis internodes and chaff in some deposits suggests that several phases of grain processing were probably taking place on-site. Few young domestic animals appear to have been slaughtered at the site, and the fact that most lived on into adulthood suggests that they were primarily used as a source of meat, but possibly also to provide secondary products such as wool and milk, as well as work and dung. The location of the settlement would have allowed use of the run-off from the ephemeral torrents that flowed from the hills of Waziristan to the west of the site, and the inhabitants are likely to have engaged in some type of flood-water farming. Storage structures imply that people might have lived at the site throughout the year, but there is also evidence that either a proportion of the population or other people that they were interacting with, were engaging in some form of transhumant pastoralism.

== Sheri Khan Tarakai in context ==
Sheri Khan Tarakai and several other contemporaneous sites in the Bannu basin and the Gomal plain present a relatively conservative cultural assemblage that shows limited technological change throughout much of the fourth millennium BC. The available dating evidence indicates that Sheri Khan Tarakai was occupied from the late fifth until the early third millennium BC.

== Related sites ==
The occupation at Sheri Khan Tarakai was contemporaneous with several other important early village sites in the borderlands at the northwestern edge of South Asia, including Mehrgarh (Periods III-V), Kili Gul Mohammad (Periods III-IV), and Rana Ghundai (Periods I-II). The earliest occupation at Sheri Khan Tarakai appears to slightly predate the earliest occupation at major sites on the plains of Punjab, such as Harappa (Period Ia - Ravi phase).

In regard to ceramic fabrics, forms and decorative and surface treatment styles of Sheri Khan Tarakai, the closest parallels are found in the second phase of northern Baluchistan (the Togau phase), which is also attested at Mehrgarh Period III, and Kili Gul Mohammed III.

== See also ==
- District Bannu
- Bannu Museum
- Indus Valley civilization
- Ghoriwala

== Bibliography ==
- Petrie, C.A. (2013), Sheri Khan Tarakai. in Chakrabarti, D.K. and Lal, M. (eds), History of Ancient India II: Protohistoric Foundations, Vivekananda International Foundation and Aryan Books International, Delhi: 852-859 - academia.edu
- Justin C. Morris, Kenneth D. Thomas (2002), Excavations at the Later Prehistoric Site of Lewan, North-West Frontier Province, Pakistan. Papers from the Institute of Archaeology 13:94 doi:10.5334/pia.178
