= Peshawar–Dera Ismail Khan motorway =

Motorway in western Pakistan

Peshawar–Dera Ismail Khan motorway
- ایم موٹروے

Route information
- Maintained by NHA
- Length: 365 km (227 mi)

Major junctions
- North end: Peshawar (Pakistan)
- South end: Dera Ismail Khan (Pakistan)

Location
- Country: Pakistan
- Towns: Peshawar, Darra Adamkhel, Kohat, Hangu, Karak, Bannu (Domel), Ghoriwala, Lakki Marwat, Darra Pezu, Dera Ismail Khan

Highway system
- Roads in Pakistan

The M-18 or the Peshawar–Dera Ismail Khan Motorway is a 365 km (227 mi) long proposed motorway connecting Peshawar with the southern parts of Khyber Pakhtunkhwa, Pakistan. Starting at the provincial capital Peshawar in the north, it will pass through 12 districts including Darra Adamkhel, Kohat, Hangu, Karak, Bannu (Domel), Ghoriwala, Lakki Marwat, and Darra Pezu, reaching Dera Ismail Khan at its southern end.

It was originally announced in December 2019 and the plan was approved by the provincial government in 2020. The first part of the project was approved by the Imran Khan government in 2021 and the feasibility study was completed in 2022. It was approved for a public private partnership construction in 2024 and the land acquisition process and initial funds were released in 2025.

== History ==
In December 2019, the project was first announced, originally spanning 339 km from Peshawar to Dera Ismail Khan instead of the later 365 km. It was approved by Chief Minister Mahmood Khan, while the design was being finalized and early costs estimated to be Rs250 billion.

In December 2020, the Government of Khyber Pakhtunkhwa led by Mahmood Khan and the Planning Department approved the project for 360 km and 19 interchanges for a cost of Rs276 billion and aiming to construct it over four years.

In August 2021, the PC-1 of the project was approved by Prime Minister of Pakistan, Imran Khan. In September 2021, it was approved from Executive Committee of the National Council with an estimated cost of Rs300 billion.

In December 2022, the Government of Khyber Pakhtunkhwa completed the feasibility study of the project and entered into financing negotiations with Asian Development Bank (ADB) and the International Finance Cooperation (IFC) for loans covering 180 of the Rs. 300 billion required for the project. The remaining Rs. 120 billion are planned to be contributed by the provincial government.

In October 2024, under Chief Minister Ali Amin Gandapur, the construction of the motorway was included in eight flagship projects launched by the government. It was announced that it aims to serve as an international trade corridor and plans to connect Khyber Pakhtunkhwa with Punjab and Balochistan economically. On 24 December 2024, the Cabinet of Khyber Pakhtunkhwa approved the construction on a public-private partnership and directed the finance department to arrange funds for land acquisition.

In January 2025, the government released an initial Rs2 billion of funds for the land acquisition process. Ali Amin Gandapur said that it will feature six lanes, 19 interchanges, and two tunnels, connecting seven districts to be completed with an estimated cost of Rs348 billion. He claims that it will boost economic and commercial development. The same month, the World Bank expressed interest in collaborating on the project.

== Details ==
=== Location ===
The motorway will be around 360 km (220 mi) long and comprise 6 lanes, with 19 interchanges. The project has two tunnels of 7 km (4.3 mi) each. It is expected to be completed in a period of 4 years. Passing through the three major Divisions of Khyber Pakhtunkhwa—Kohat, Bannu and Dera Ismail Khan, the motorway will connect the cities of Kohat, Hangu, Karak, Bannu, Lakki Marwat, Tank and Dera Ismail Khan with the Kharlachi (D.I.Khan), Ghulam Khan (North Waziristan) and Angur Ada (South Waziristan) border crossings on the Durand Line-Afghanistan–Pakistan border to the west.

=== Interchange list ===
1. M1 Interchange
2. Tarnab Interchange
3. Ring Road Interchange
4. Matni-Badaber Interchange
5. Dara Adam Khel Interchange
6. Kohat Interchange
7. Sher Kot-Asterzai Interchange
8. Raeesan-Jozara Interchange
9. Hangu-Tall Interchange
10. Karapa-Lachi Interchange
11. Soor Dag Interchange
12. Bannu-Domel Interchange
13. Ghoriwala-Sarai Naurang Interchange
14. Gazni Khel-Lakki Marwat Interchange
15. Pezo-Tank Interchange
16. Yark Hakla-Islamabad Interchange
17. DI Khan Interchange
18. Zhob Quetta Interchange
19. Darya Khan-DI Khan Interchange

== See also ==
- Khyber Pakhtunkhwa
- Motorways of Pakistan
- Peshawar
- Dera Ismail Khan
- Bannu
- Ghoriwala
- China-Pakistan Economic Corridor
