= Zeraki Pirba Khel =

- Town and union council
- Country: Pakistan
- Region: Khyber-Pakhtunkhwa
- District: Bannu District
- Time zone: UTC+5 (PST)

Zeraki Pirba Khel is a town and union council of Bannu District in the Khyber-Pakhtunkhwa province of Pakistan. In Zeraki Pirba Khel the most common villages are Adam Kila, Madi Khel, Mama Khel, Abad Khel, BanoChi Kila, Shah Hussain Kila, Akondan Banda, Lapri Kila, Sheri Khel, Baghar Khel, Qamar Kila, Oteen Khel, Sheri Kila, Hafiz Abadand Oliga Mosa Khel. The head office of the Union Council is located in Lapri Kila.
