= Dairy Science Park =

Scientific organization

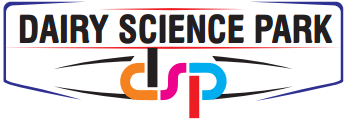
- Abbreviation: DSP
- Founder: Subhan Qureshi
- Headquarters: Peshawar, Pakistan
- President: Irfan Qureshi
- Website: dairysciencepark.org

Dairy Science Park (DSP; Urdu: ڈیری سائنس پارک; Pashto: د شيدو پوهنيز پارک) is a scientific organization initiated in Peshawar, Khyber Pakhtunkhwa, Pakistan as a mission for the economic revival of northern Pakistan and the adjoining areas of Afghanistan. Dairy Science Park aims to improve the status of public health safety and food security in the region through productive utilization of livestock and poultry resources, and to pass the relevant research of industrial importance through business incubation models.

Dairy Science Park focuses on the networking of small and medium-sized farms with service providers, markets, and emerging entrepreneurs. It wants to bring innovations in the local farming system to achieve the Sustainable Development Goals of hygienic food production and self-employment generation in partnership with the United Nations.

== History ==
The name "Dairy Science Park" was coined in 2010 in Cairo, Egypt jointly by Abdul Rahman Ilyas, who was then chief operating officer of the agri-science park of ICRISAT, India, and Muhammad Subhan Qureshi, during their discussion on productive utilization of the livestock resources of Khyber Pakhtunkhwa. Initially, the idea of Dairy Science Park had emerged from Chief Minister’s Livestock Development Plan, which was prepared by Muhammad Subhan Qureshi in 1998 on advice of the Chief Minister Sardar Mehtab Abbasi. Later in 2003, Qureshi's plan was also approved by the Chief Minister Akram Khan Durrani. In 2011, a series of international workshops on Dairy Science Park was started at the University of Agriculture, Peshawar. In 2014, Dairy Science Park gave birth to Peshawar Meat Company, and soon afterwards, Livestock Business Facilitation Desk of Dairy Science Park (LBFD-DSP) was inaugurated at Khyber Pakhtunkhwa Chamber of Commerce and Industry by the Khyber Pakhtunkhwa agriculture minister Ikramullah Khan Gandapur. In November 2016, Dairy Science Park signed an MoU on "Collaborative Biorisk Management Initiative" with the University of Agriculture, Peshawar, Khyber Medical University, and the Higher Education Commission of Pakistan.

== Conferences ==
A biennial series of international workshops on Dairy Science Park has been in place. Three workshops were held in 2011, 2013, and 2015, respectively, at the University of Agriculture, Peshawar. Each workshop was attended by over 500 participants from academia, business and farming community, and development and government organizations of regional countries. The speakers at the workshops welcomed self-employment schemes and food safety measures from Dairy Science Park, and highlighted the role of local governments in it. The fourth DSP conference was held in November 2017 at Selçuk University in Konya, Turkey, with participation from Konya Metropolitan Municipality and Selçuk University, and in cooperation with 13 other countries. In the fourth DSP conference in Konya, it was announced that two technoparks will be established in Mardan and Quetta, Pakistan, to promote the use of modern technology and develop dairy sector in the region.

== Publications ==
Smith and Franklin Academic Publishing Corporation, an England-based publisher, is publishing Meat Science and Veterinary Public Health (MSVPH), an online quarterly journal which is a joint product of Dairy Science Park and the University of Agriculture, Peshawar. Smith and Franklin Academic Publishing Corporation was featured on Beall's List of "potential, possible, or probable predatory scholarly open-access publishers" before it was taken down in 2017. Dairy Science Park also publishes a quarterly newsletter.

== Future vision ==
Dairy Science Park envisions economic prosperity in the region through industrial utilization of livestock resources, which possess high export potential. It will develop entrepreneurs and network them with service providers, input suppliers, processing factories, and finance agencies to bring a stable peace in the region. Agri-Marts will be established with products having certified quality and halal status, produced at farms with certified inputs and services, backed up with a sound set-up of value addition for meat, milk, eggs, fish, fruits, and vegetables. Dairy Science Park will register corporate partners for training, research, and quality monitoring purpose.
