= Peter Gracey =

English cricketer, soldier

Personal information
- Full name: Peter Bosworth Kirkwood Gracey
- Born: 12 December 1921; Bannu, North-West Frontier Province, British India
- Died: 13 September 2006 (aged 84); Rye, Sussex, England
- Batting: Right-handed
- Bowling: Leg break

Domestic team information
- Years: Team
- 1945/46: Europeans
- 1947–1948: Oxford University

Career statistics
Competition	First-class
Matches	5
Runs scored	176
Batting average	22.00
100s/50s	–/1
Top score	61
Balls bowled	86
Wickets	2
Bowling average	27.00
5 wickets in innings	–
10 wickets in match	–
Best bowling	2/21
Catches/stumpings	7/–
- Source: Cricinfo, 24 March 2020

Peter Bosworth Kirkwood Gracey (12 December 1921 – 13 September 2006) was an English British Army officer and sportsman.

The son of Hugh Malcolm Kirkwood Gracey, a soldier in the British Indian Army, and Elsie Marian Bosworth, he was born in British India at Bannu in December 1921. He was educated in England at Wellington College. Gracey served in the Second World War with the Royal Engineers, being commissioned as a second lieutenant in June 1942. While serving in India, he made his debut in first-class cricket for the Europeans cricket team against the Indians at Madras in a 1945–46 Madras Presidency Match.

Returning to England after the war, he went up to Brasenose College, Oxford as a Heath Harrison Exhibitioner in 1946. While studying at Oxford, he was awarded blues in golf and hockey, and made four appearances in first-class cricket for Oxford University, playing three matches in 1947 and a single match in 1948. He scored 176 runs in first-class cricket, with his highest score of 61 coming for the Europeans. He was later a member of the Worshipful Company of Wax Chandlers. Gracey died at Rye in September 2006.
