= Ghazi Sial =

Pakistani poet (c.1933–2019)

- Born: c. 1933; Kotka Akundan, Mandan, Bannu District, Khyber Pakhtunkhwa, British India
- Died: 27 November 2019
- Occupations: Poet, folk songwriter
- Writing career
- Language: Pashto
- Notable works: Banzey, Kashmala, Mangarai, Zama Sandaray Sta Da Para
- Notable awards: Pride of Performance (2006)

Mohammad Ghazi (c. 1933 – 27 November 2019), known by his pen name Ghazi Sial and by an honorific title in Pashto literature as Baba Sandara, was a Pakistani poet and Pashto folk song writer. He wrote sixteen books in Pashto language.

== Awards and recognition ==
In 2006, the Government of Pakistan conferred Pride of Performance award upon him in recognition of his literary contribution to Pashto poetry.

== Biography ==
Mohammad Ghazi was born in 1933 at Kotka Akundan village of Bannu District, Khyber Pakhtunkhwa. He learned folk classics in Pashto, Arabic and Persian language from his father, Abdul Ghafoor Shah, who was a literary figure and a noted religious scholar. Mohammad Ghazi started composing Pashto folk songs in his late teens. Then he worked for Radio Pakistan at Peshawar for 30 years where he used to write Pashto folk songs. His books Banzey, Kashmala, Mangarai and Zama Sandaray Sta Da Para are among the popular Pashto poetic works he wrote during his literary career.

His folk songs were sung by popular Pashto-language vocalists including Zarsanga, Gulnar Begum, Kishwar Sultana among others. He also wrote scripts, storylines and dialogues for nearly 50 Pashto films.

He was recognized as a prominent poet both in Pakistan and in Afghanistan.
