= NARS =

Nars or NARS may refer to:

- Karl Nars (1874–1952), Finnish industrialist
- Natural Area Reserves System such as the Natural Area Reserves System Hawaii
- North Atlantic Radio System, a troposcatter communications system for the air defence of NATO's North-Eastern flank
- NARS Cosmetics
- NARS (gene) (Asparaginyl-tRNA synthetase, cytoplasmic), an enzyme in humans
- Nested Arrays Research System, an extension of the APL programming language such as NARS2000
- Northwest Amateur Radio Society, an amateur radio club

== See also ==
- Nar (disambiguation)
