= NA-39 Bannu =

Constituency of the National Assembly of Pakistan

- Constituency for the National Assembly of Pakistan
- Region: Bannu District
- Electorate: 723,459

Current constituency
- Party: Pakistan Tehreek-e-Insaf
- Member: Naseem Ali Shah
- Created from: NA-26 Bannu

NA-39 Bannu (این اے-39، بنوں) is a constituency for the National Assembly of Pakistan. It covers the whole of district Bannu. The constituency was formerly known as NA-26 Bannu from 1977 to 2018. The name changed to NA-35 Bannu after the delimitation in 2018.

== Members of Parliament ==
=== 1977–2002: NA-26 Bannu ===
Election	Member	Party
1977	Sahibzada Saifullah	PNA
1985	Sahibzada Fateh-ullah	Independent
1988	M. Hanif Khan	PPP
1990	Ahmed Hassan	IJI
1993	Malik Muzafar Khan	PPP
1997	Muhammad Khan	PML-N

=== 2002–present: NA-39 Bannu ===
Election	Member	Party
2002	Maulana Nasib Ali Shah	MMA
2008	Maulana Fazal ur Rehman	MMA
2013	Akram Khan Durrani	JUI (F)
2018	Imran Khan	PTI
By-election 2018	Zahid Akram Durrani	MMA
2024	Naseem Ali Shah	PTI

== Elections since 2002 ==
=== 2002 general election ===
2002 General Election: NA-26 Bannu
Party	Candidate	Votes	%	±%
MMA	Syed Nasib Ali Shah	78,886	70.12	
Independent	Muhammad Mustafa Khan	31,867	28.33	
National Alliance	Saifur Rehman	1,140	1.01	
MQM	Muhammad Roshan	603	0.54	
Majority		47,019	41.79	
Turnout		112,496	38.53	
MMA gain from PML (N)				

A total of 2,106 votes were rejected.

=== 2008 general election ===
2008 General Election: NA-26 Bannu
Party	Candidate	Votes	%	±%
MMA	Fazal-ur-Rehman	91,484	55.62	−14.50
Independent	Malik Nasir Khan	56,546	34.38	
Independent	Lt. Colonel Alhaj Inamullah Wazir	11,588	7.05	
Independent	Muhammad Mustafa Khan	3,633	2.21	
Independent	Abdul Hafeez	626	0.38	
MQM	Muhammad Roshan Khan	586	0.36	−0.18
Majority		34,938	21.24	
Turnout		164,463	43.42	+4.89

A total of 2,792 votes were rejected.

=== 2013 general election ===
2013 General Election: NA-26 Bannu
Party	Candidate	Votes	%	±%
JUI-F	Akram Khan Durrani	78,294	44.74	
Independent	Naseem Ali Shah	45,270	25.87	
PTI	Matiullah Khan	25,392	14.51	
JI	Muhammad Ibrahim Khan	12,831	7.33	
Independent	Alamgir Khan	4,594	2.63	
Independent	Malik Akhtar Ali Khan	3,260	1.86	
PPP	Anwar Saifullah Khan	2,320	1.33	
Independent	Doctor Raham Baz Khan	806	0.46	
Independent	Abdul Samad Khan	432	0.25	
TTP	Nek Daraz Khan	404	0.23	
PkMAP	Main Asmatullah Shah	348	0.20	
Independent	Zafar Jehangir Khan	323	0.18	
MQM	Imran Khan	260	0.15	−0.21
Independent	Muhammad Hayat Khan	251	0.14	
MDM	Faridullah	112	0.06	
Independent	Muqarab Khan Wazir	58	0.03	
APML	Hizbullah	52	0.03	
Majority		33,024	18.87	
Turnout		175,007	39.00	−4.42
JUI (F) gain from MMA				

A total of 5,300 votes were rejected.

=== 2018 general election ===
General elections were held on 25 July 2018. Imran Khan, the chairman of Pakistan Tehreek-e-Insaf, won the election but vacated this constituency in favor of NA-95 (Mianwali-I).

General election 2018: NA-35 Bannu
Party	Candidate	Votes	%	±%
PTI	Imran Khan	113,822	47.63	
MMA	Akram Khan Durrani	106,820	44.70	
Others	Others (ten candidates)	18,320	7.67	
Turnout		246,318	42.55	▲3.55
Total valid votes		238,962	97.01	
Rejected ballots		7,356	2.99	
Majority		7,002	2.93	
Registered electors		578,872		
PTI gain from JUI (F)				

=== By-election 2018 ===
By-elections were held in this constituency on 14 October 2018.

By-election 2018: NA-35 Bannu
Party	Candidate	Votes	%	±%
MMA	Zahid Akram Durrani	60,993	49.33	▲4.63
PTI	Naseem Ali Shah	37,622	30.43	▼17.20
Independent	Malik Nasir Khan	21,821	17.65	▲17.65
Others	Others (five candidates)	3,203	2.59	
Turnout		124,916	21.43	▼21.12
Total valid votes		123,639	98.98	▲1.97
Rejected ballots		1,281	1.02	▼1.97
Majority		23,371	18.90	▲21.83
Registered electors		582,785		
MMA gain from PTI		Swing	▲10.98	

=== 2024 general election ===
General elections were held on 8 February 2024. Naseem Ali Shah won with 146,667 votes.

General election 2024: NA-39 Bannu
Party	Candidate	Votes	%	±%
PTI	Nasim Ali Shah (Note: Filed nomination papers as PTI candidate but ECP allowed him to run as an Independent)	146,667	52.71	▲22.32
JUI (F)	Zahid Akram Durrani	111,293	40.00	▼9.41
Others	Others (seventeen candidates)	20,298	7.29	
Turnout		285,505	39.46	▲18.07
Total valid votes		278,258	97.46	
Rejected ballots		1,281	2.54	
Majority		35,374	12.71	
Registered electors		723,459		

== See also ==
- NA-38 Karak
- NA-40 North Waziristan
