= Mughal Khel =

Ethnic Pashtun tribe

Mughal Khel مغل خېل
- Yusufzai Tribe
- Ethnicity: Pashtun
- Location: Ghoriwala, Bannu
- Parent tribe: Yusufzais • Sarbani Pashtuns
- Branches: Qasim Khel, Jafar Khel, Hakim Khel, Madasm Khel
- Language: Banuchi dialect of Pashto
- Religion: Islam

The Mughal Khel (Pashto:مغل خېل) is a Pashtun clan of the Yusufzai tribe, primarily residing in the southern part of Bannu District, particularly in and around the city of Ghoriwala.

They are known for speaking the Central dialect of Pashto, while still maintaining their Yousafzai heritage. The tribe traces its lineage back to Hassan Khan Yousafzai, an adventurer from Yousafzai county, who initially settled in Kurram before his descendants migrated to Ghoriwala. Hassan Khan Yousafzai belonged to the Gadezai branch of the Ilyaszai Yousafzai clan. Presently, the population of the Mughal Khels is estimated to be in the tens of thousands.

== History ==
=== Yousafzai of Ghoriwala ===
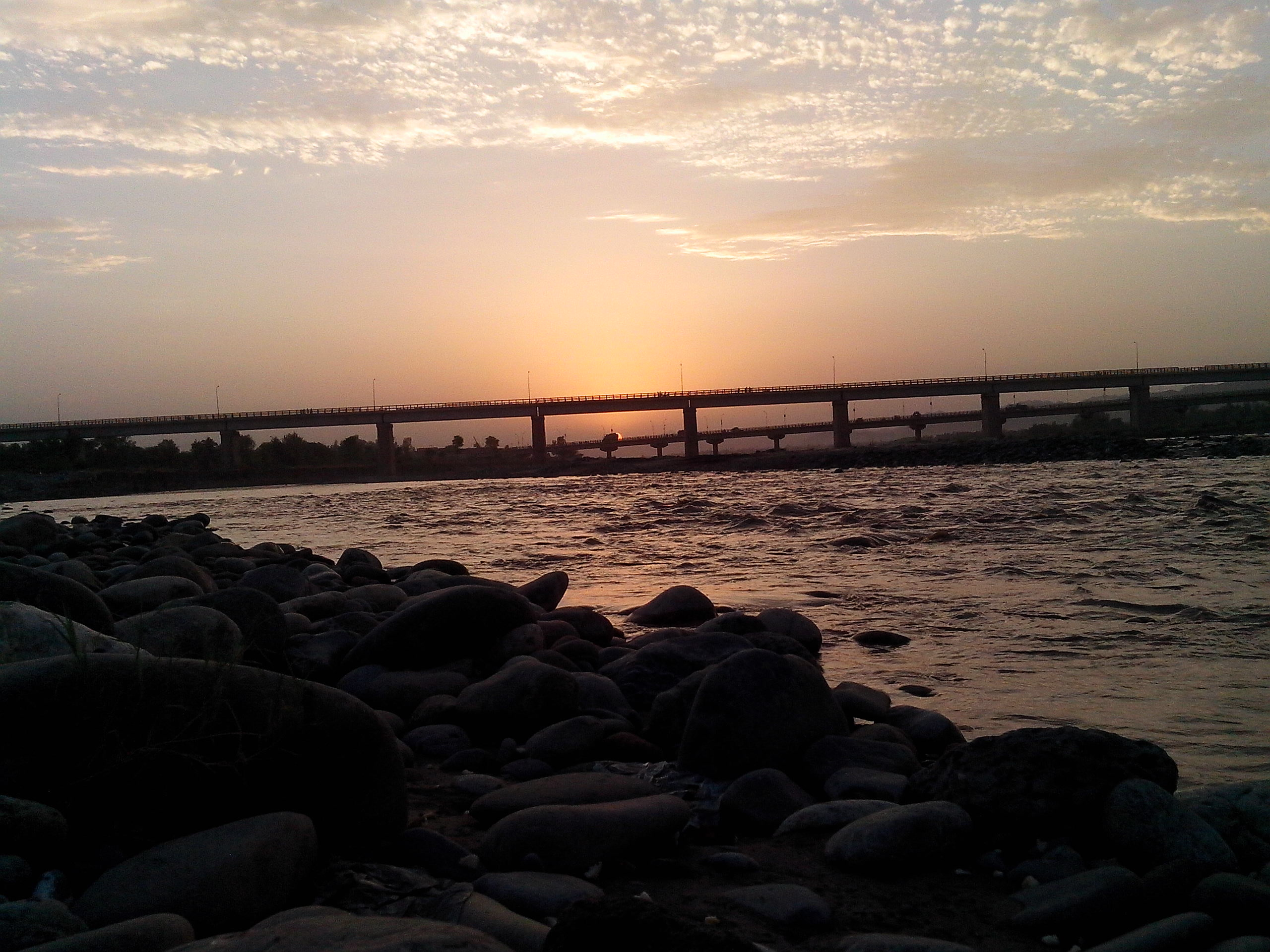
River Kuram Bridge, District Bannu

One of Iliaszai grandson through Taje, was a man named Gadezai, who had five sons: Hassan, Behram, Ali Sher, Hussain, and Ibrahim. The first four sons settled in present-day District Buner, while Ibrahim was separated from them during the massacre of Yousafzai by Ulugh Beg in Kabul. Initially settling in Kurram, Ibrahim's descendants eventually migrated to Ghoriwala in present-day District Bannu.

Ibrahim had only one son named Hassan Khan, and his family was known as Hassan Khel. However, after one of his descendant, Mughal Khan Yousafzai, his tribe came to be known as Mughal Khel. Mughal Khan's leadership and capabilities helped establish his tribe as one of the leading and honorable tribes of Bannu. Jaffar Khan Yousafzai, Mughal Khan's grandson, also earned a name and place for himself among the elders of the district. He also commissioned the construction of a mosque in Bannu Bazar in around the 1820s.

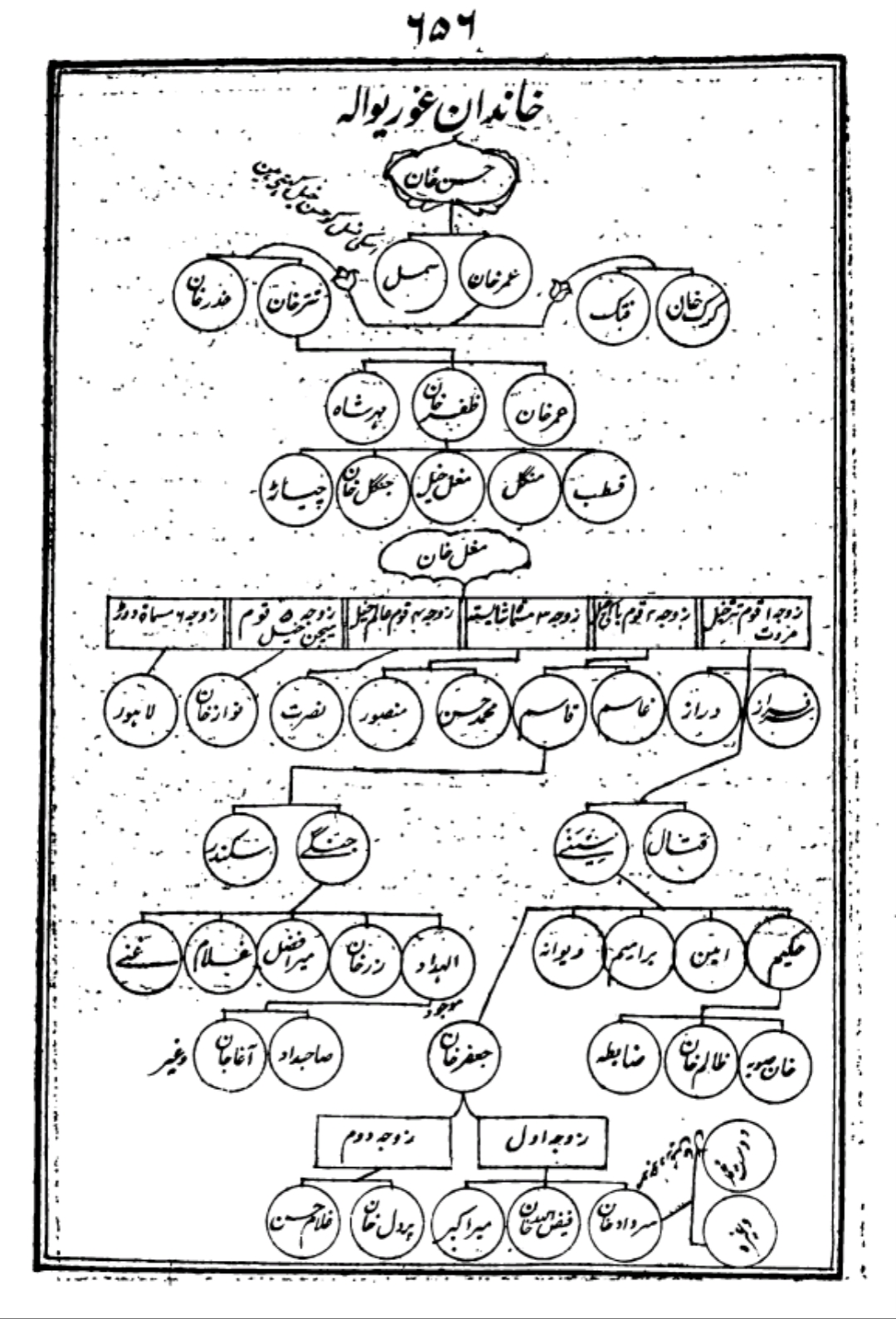
Tribal tree of Mughal Khel from Hayat-i Afghani

The Mughal Khel tribe has the following sub-tribes: Qasim Khel, Jaffar Khel, Hakim Khel, and Muhammad Hassan Khel. The Mughal Khel have ruled and held the position of maliks in Ghoriwala for more than 300 years. Due to centuries of living in a land far away from their brethren, the Mughal Khels gradually assimilated in the local society, adopting the local elements and thus have transitioned from the Hard Pashto pronunciations to Soft Pashto but still in their speech and appearance their long lost characters can be identified.

As the author of Bannu Gazetteer said:

The most notable case of the sort is that of the Mughal Khels of Ghoriwala, a Yousafzai group, who conquered territory for themselves seven generations ago and still preserve in speech and physiognomy proof of their origin.

— Herbert Benjamin Edwardes, Gazetteer of the Bannu District 1883
