= Nar Jaffar Khan =

Nar Jaffar Khan جوپار کله
- Location within Khyber Pakhtunkhwa Location within Pakistan
- Coordinates: 32°51′33″N 70°44′06″E
- Country: Pakistan
- Province: Khyber-Pakhtunkhwa
- District: Bannu District
- Named for: Jaffar Khan Mughal Khel

Government
  - Type: Union Council
- Time zone: UTC+5 (PST)
- Postal code: 28331

Nar Jaffar Khan is a town and union council in Bannu District of Khyber Pakhtunkhwa, Pakistan. It is located at an altitude of 290 metres (954 feet).
