= Syed Nasib Ali Shah =

Pakistani politician

- سیّد نصیب علی شاہ

Member of the National Assembly of Pakistan
- In office 10 October 2002 – 22 January 2007
- Constituency: NA-26 (Bannu)

Personal details
- Born: Ghoriwala, Bannu
- Died: 22 January 2007
- Party: Muttahida Majlis-e-Amal (MMA)
- Children: Naseem Ali Shah
- Occupation: Politician

Syed Nasib Ali Shah was a Pakistani Islamic scholar and politician who served as member of the 12th National Assembly of Pakistan from 16 November 2002 until his death on 22 January 2007.

== See also ==
- List of Deobandis
