= Akra, Bannu =

- آکرہ (Urdu)
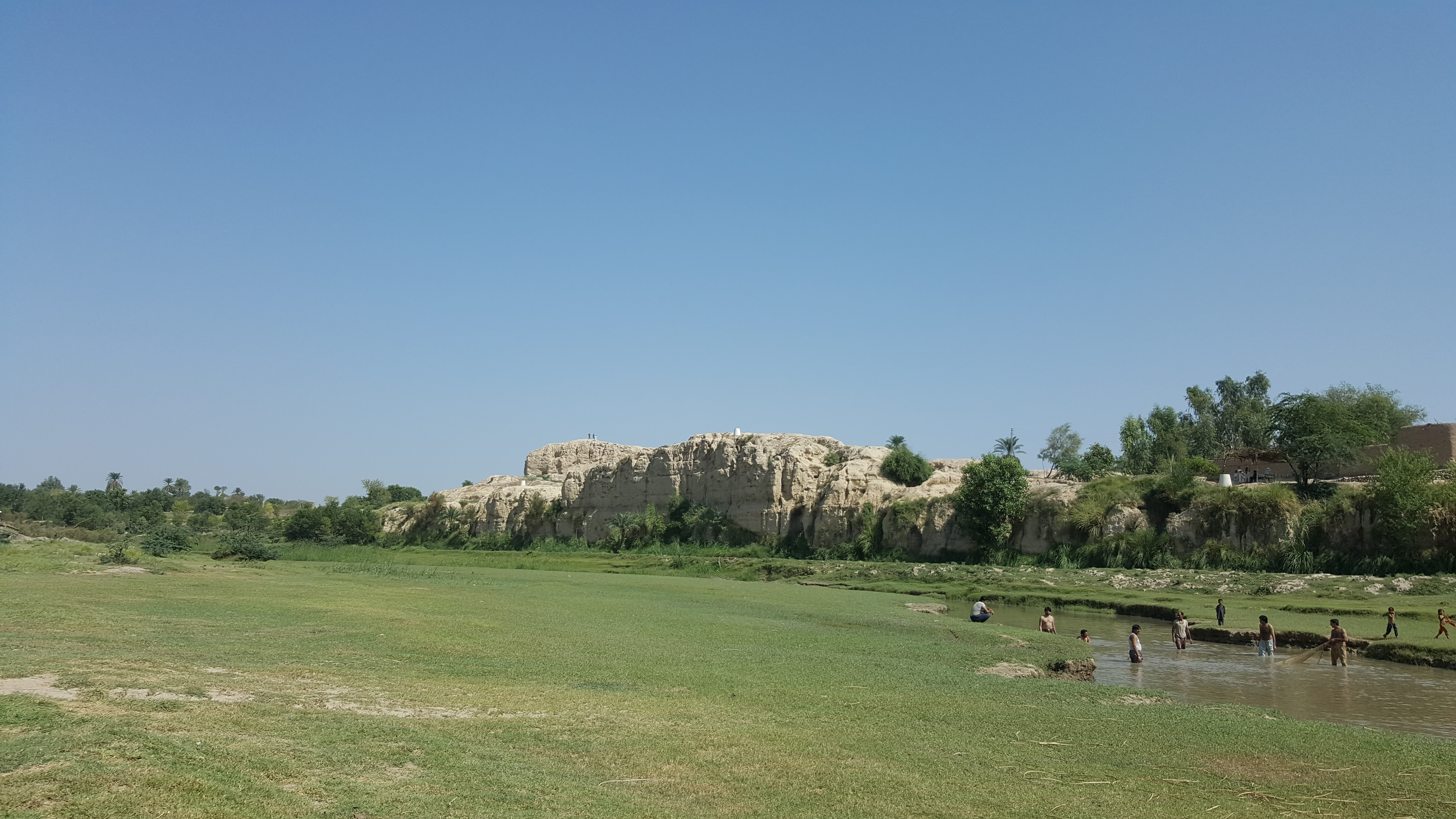
- Interactive map of Akra, Bannu
- 32°52′38.2530″N 70°38′4.6464″E
- Type: Settlement
- Location: Bannu, Pakistan

Site notes
- Area: 133 Kanal

Akra (آکرہ) is an archaeological site in Bannu, Khyber Pakhtunkhwa, Pakistan. It dates from the Early Historic Period.

Akra has been known to scholars, though not explored in any depth, since the middle of the last century, and untouched by the modem archaeologist until 1995. In 1995 the work of the Bannu Archaeological Project began at Akra.

A much earlier site in this area, Sheri Khan Tarakai was also explored by the Bannu Archaeological Project.

== Archeological history ==
Akra is the most important of all the sites of the Early Historic Period in Bannu and the most physically prominent of all ancient places in the Bunnu area.

Akra covers some 80 hectares, thus it is the largest archaeological site in the Bannu area. The site was first occupied around 2000 BC, and may have continued to be inhabited until the 11th century AD.

== Location ==
It is located in an idyllic rural landscape, with lush green fields, palm and poplar trees, and set to the tranquil sound of the Lohra (known locally as the ‘Lairra’) Nullah. which has recently been transformed into the cloaca maxima of liannu City with the opening of the municipal sewage works upstream.

Excavations at Akra began in March 1996 in the complex of mounds on the extensive area flanking the right hank of the Lohra Nullah (Area R), a pictures que small stream dividing the entire site complex conveniently in two. This work continued into the 1997 and 1998 field seasons, when excavation began in the lower-lying areas of the high. A major survey of the site using an EDM (Electronic Distance Measurer) was completed in 1998 resulting in a computer-generated image of the entire site so far for any site in the North West Frontier Province.

A large quantity of material from Akra, some recently acquired in the field both from the surface of the site and from excavation, has been examined, and is presented in combination with material from collections in the British Museum and the Ashmolcan Museum, Oxford.
