= Zahid Akram Durrani =

Pakistani politician

- زاہد اکرم درانی

20th Deputy Speaker of the National Assembly of Pakistan
- In office 21 April 2022 – 9 August 2023
- President: Arif Alvi
- Prime Minister: Shehbaz Sharif
- Preceded by: Qasim Suri
- Succeeded by: Ghulam Mustafa Shah

Member of the National Assembly of Pakistan
- In office 29 October 2018 – 10 August 2023
- Constituency: NA-35 (Bannu)

Personal details
- Party: PTI-P (2026-present)
- Other political affiliations: JUI (F) (2018-2025)
- Parent: Akram Khan Durrani (father)
- Education: Edwardes College Peshawar

Zahid Akram Durrani (Urdu: زاہد اکرم درانی; Pashto: زاهد اکرم دراني) is a Pakistani politician and a member of Muttahida Majlis-e-Amal who is currently serving as 20th Deputy Speaker of the National Assembly since 21 April 2022 to 9 August 2023. He had been a member of the National Assembly of Pakistan from October 2018 till August 2023, elected from NA-35 (Bannu).

He is the son of former Chief Minister of Khyber Pakhtunkhwa, Akram Khan Durrani.

== Political career ==
Durrani was elected to the National Assembly of Pakistan as a candidate of Muttahida Majlis-e-Amal (MMA) from Constituency NA-35 (Bannu) in the 2018 Pakistani by-elections held on 14 October 2018, getting 60,944 votes.
