= Bannu =

Bannu: باني; بنوں; Bani Gul
- City
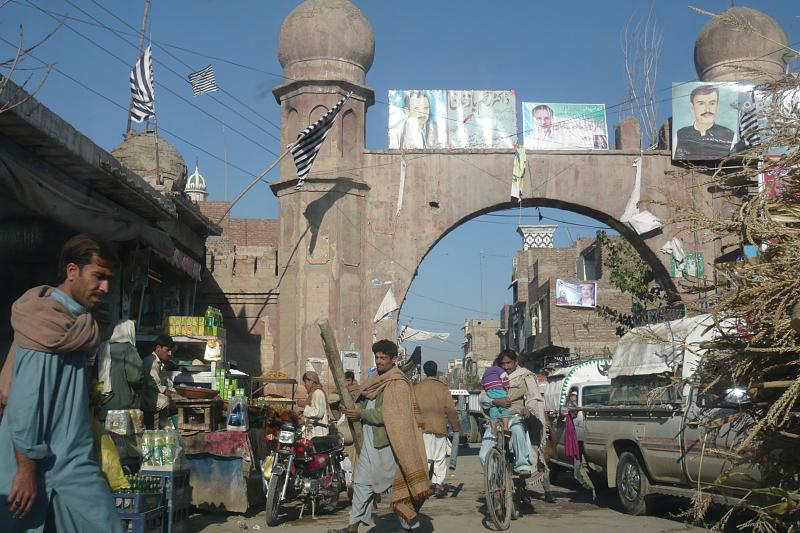
- A street in Bannu
- Nickname: بنی گل
- Location within Pakistan Bannu (Pakistan)
- Coordinates: 32°59′11″N 70°36′16″E
- Country: Pakistan
- Province: Khyber Pakhtunkhwa
- Division: Bannu
- District: Bannu
- Headquarters: Bannu

Government
  - Type: Mayor-council
  - Body: District Government
  - Mayor: Irfan Khan Durrani (JUI-F)
  - Deputy Commissioner: Shah Saud BPS-18(PAS)
  - District Police Officer: Dr. Muhammad Iqbal (BPS-18 PSP)

Area
  - Town: 1,972 km^{2} (761 sq mi)
- Elevation: 375.514 m (1,232.00 ft)

Population (2023)
  - Town: 41,015
  - Density: 20.80/km^{2} (53.87/sq mi)
- Time zone: UTC+5 (PST)
- Majority ethnicity: Pashtun
- Website: bannu.kp.gov.pk

Bannu (Urdu: بنوں, romanized: bannū̃, pronounced [bənːũː]), also called Bani Gul or Bani (Pashto: باني, romanized: bānī, pronounced [ˈbɑni]) is a city located on the Kurram River in southern Khyber Pakhtunkhwa, Pakistan. It is the capital of Bannu Division. Bannu's residents are primarily members of the Banuchi tribe and speak Banuchi (Baniswola), a dialect of Pashto which is similar to the distinct Waziristani dialect. The residents regardless of their tribes are commonly called Banusi, Banuchi or Banisi.

Bannu Valley From Space

The major industries of Bannu are cloth weaving, sugar mills and the manufacturing of cotton fabrics, machinery and equipment. It is famous for its weekly Jumma fair. The district forms a basin drained by the Kurram and Gambila (or Tochi) rivers.

== Etymology ==
According to the philologist Michael Witzel, the city was originally known in Avestan as Varəna (𐬬𐬀𐬭𐬆𐬥𐬀), from which its modern name derives. The ancient Sanskrit grammarian Pāṇini recorded its name as Varṇu (वर्णु).

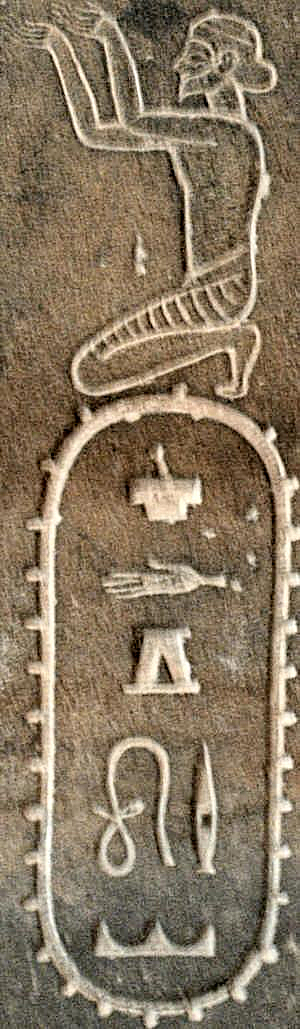
Sattagydia (𓐠𓂧𓎼𓍯𓍒𓈉, S-d-g-wꜣ-ḏꜣ), on the Egyptian Statue of Darius I.

During the 6th century BCE, the basin around Bannu was known as Sattagydia (Old Persian: 𐎰𐎫𐎦𐎢𐏁 Thataguš, country of the "hundred cows").

== History ==
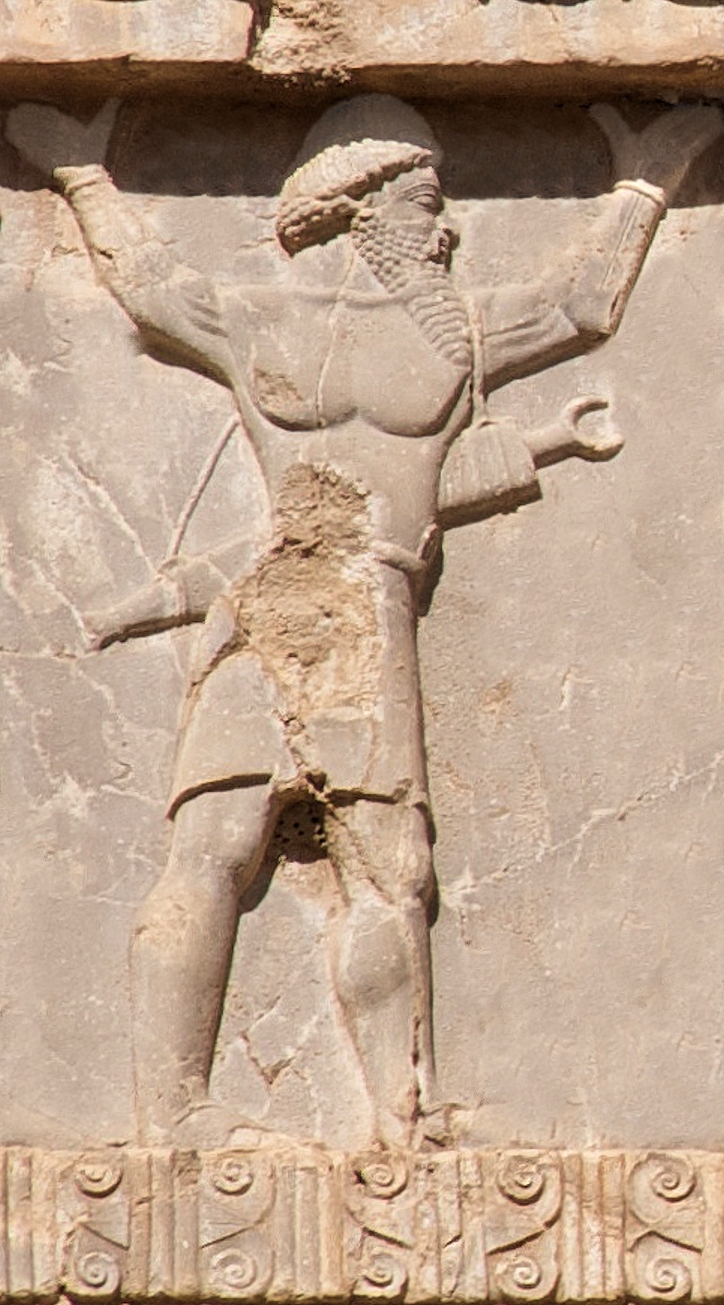
Tomb of Xerxes I, Sattagydian soldier of the Achaemenid army, c. 480 BCE

The history of Bannu goes back to prehistoric time, due to its strategic location along the Kurram and Tochi routes which lead into the Indus Valley. Sheri Khan Tarakai is an ancient settlement site located in the Bannu District with ruins of the oldest known village settlement in the Bannu region, which was occupied from the late fifth until the early third millennium BCE. Recent archaeological excavations at Akra, Bannu showed that it was a large urban site that existed throughout the Iron Age and had trade relations with Central Asia.

The sacred texts of Zend Avesta and Vendidad mentions Varəna, the Avestan predecessor of the name for Bannu, as the 14th in the list of the "16 perfect lands" created by Ahura Mazda. According to the Avesta, Varəna was the homeland and birthplace of the legendary King Fereydun (known in Avestan as Θraētaona, and also known as Āθβiiāni, "of the house of Abtin").

In the 6th century BCE, the region around Bannu was known as Sattagydia (lit. "country of 100 cows") and constituted the southern part of the greater region of Paropamisadae. Under the Persian Achaemenid Empire, Sattagydia became part of the Empire's 7th taxation district, which also included the Gandāra, Dadicae, and Aparytae regions. Sattagydia was mentioned in the Behistun inscription of Darius the Great as one of the satrapies in revolt while the king was in Babylon. The revolt was presumably suppressed in 515 BCE.

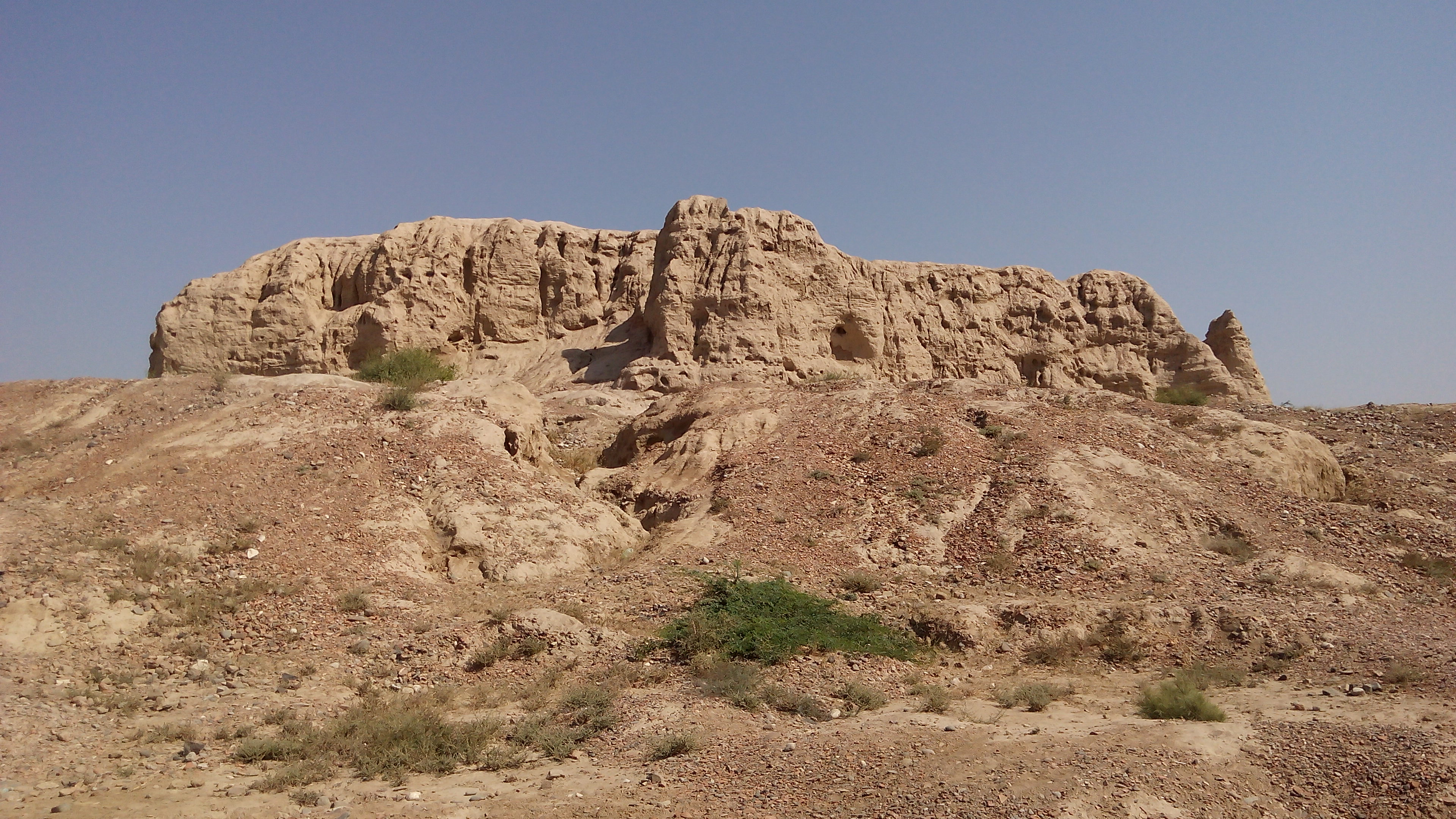
The Akra mound in Bannu, which dates back to 6th century BC during Achaemenid rule

After being conquered by Alexander in the 4th century BCE, the region became part of the Greek Seleucid Empire for a short while until the Mauryan Empire took control over the region around 305 BCE, as the entire region of North-West India constituting Paropamisadae, Arachosia and Gedrosia was transferred to Mauryan Empire by the Seleucids.

After the decline of Mauryan Empire, the region fell under the administrative and political control of Indo-Greeks, Indo-Scythian and Indo-Parthians successively. Kushan emperor Kujula Kadphises defeated the Indo-Parthians and incorporated the region under the Kushan Empire. In the Tochi Valley of North Waziristan near Bannu, Bactrian language inscriptions originally written in the 9th century have been discovered. This shows that after the collapse of the Kushan Empire, its official language continued in use for at least six more centuries.

After the decline of the Kushan Empire, the region subsequently came under the control of Gupta Empire. The Kidarites began invading the North-West regions of Gupta Empire during the reign of Emperor Kumaragupta. The Gupta Empire ended up losing its control over the region around the early 5th century CE.

The Kidarites then too came under the attack from Hephthalites who defeated the Kidarites and appointed sub-rulers and kings to rule over the region. Hūṇa King Mihirakula was the most famous ruler from the Alchon Hun dynasty.

Aulikara ruler, Yashodharman defeated the Hūṇa King Toramana and took control over most of North-West India. The remnants of the Hepthalite Empire continued to rule over the region until the 9th century CE when the Hindu Shahis came to power and established their rule over the region for over 150 years.

In the late 10th and early 11th century CE, the Ghaznavids conquered the area. Mahmud of Ghazni used the Bannu route for several of his raids deeper into Northern India.

=== British rule ===
The city was renamed in 1848 by Herbert Benjamin Edwardes, a lieutenant in the 1st Bengal European Fusiliers Regiment of the East India Company's private army. He ordered the construction of the fort – named Dhulipgarh (Dalipgarh) in honour of the Maharajah of Lahore – at the same time. At the time of its founding, the town was named Dhulipnagar (Dalipnagar). Its name was later changed to Edwardesabad in 1869. In 1903, it received its current name, Bannu.

Bannu was used as the base of operations for all punitive expeditions undertaken by detachments of the British Indian Army to the Tochi Valley and the Waziristan frontier. A military road led from the town of Bannu toward Dera Ismail Khan. This road was built by military engineers under the supervision of a Bannu engineer, Ram N. Mullick. Mullick graduated from Banaras Engineering College and had served in Iraq and Lahore as an expert in heavy earth-moving equipment before the independence of Pakistan in 1947.

According to the Imperial British Gazetteer, Bannu was described by the following:

[The population in 1901 was] 14,291, including cantonment and civil lines (4,349). It was founded in 1848 by Lieutenant (afterwards Sir Herbert) Edwardes, who selected the site for political reasons. The fort, erected at the same time, bore the name of Dhulipgarh (Dalipgarh), in honour of the Maharaja of Lahore; and the bazar was also known as Dhulipnagar (Dalipnagar). A town gradually grew up around the bazar, and many Hindko speaking Hindu traders moved there from Bazar Ahmad Khan, which had formed the commercial center of the Bannu valley prior to annexation. The Church Missionary Society supports a small church and a high school founded in 1865. The cantonment centers in the fort of Dhulipgarh. Its garrison consists of a mountain battery, a regiment of native cavalry, and two regiments of infantry. The municipality was constituted in 1867.

The municipal receipts and expenditure during the ten years ending 1903–1904 averaged Rs. 46,000. In 1903–1904 the income was Rs. 47,000 chiefly derived from octroi; and the expenditure was Rs. 55,000. The receipts and expenditure of cantonment funds during the ten years ending 1902–3 averaged Rs. 4,200 and Rs. 3,700. The profuse irrigation and insufficient drainage of the surrounding fields render Bannu an unhealthy station. The town has a considerable trade, including fish guts and butts. Also, embracing the whole traffic in local produce of the Bannu valley. The nearest railway station is at Kohat on the Khushalgarh-Thal branch of the North-Western Railway, 79 miles distant by road. A weekly fair collects an average number of 8,000 buyers and sellers. The chief articles of trade are cloth, live-stock, wool, cotton, tobacco and grain. Bannu possesses a dispensary and two high schools, a public library and a town hall known as the Nicholson Memorial.

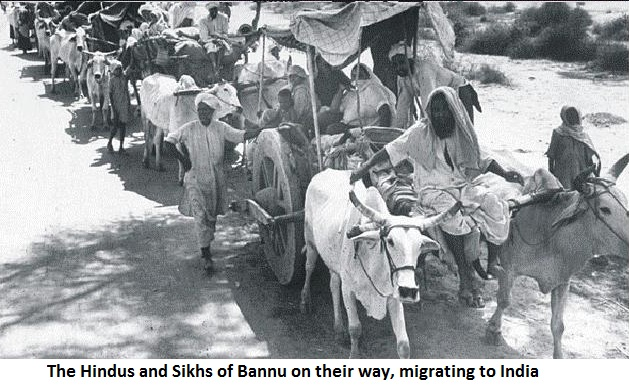
Hindus and Sikhs of Bannu migrating to India during the partition of 1947

=== 1947 Bannu Jirga ===
On 21 June 1947 in Bannu, a jirga was held by Pashtun leaders including Bacha Khan, his brother Chief Minister Dr Khan Sahib, the Khudai Khidmatgars, members of the Provincial Assembly, Mirzali Khan (Faqir of Ipi), and other tribal chiefs, just seven weeks before the Partition of India. The jirga declared the Bannu Resolution, which demanded that the Pashtuns be given a choice to have an independent state of Pashtunistan composing all Pashtun territories of British India, instead of being made to join either India or Pakistan. However, the British Raj refused to comply with the demand of this resolution, in response to which the Khudai Khidmatgars boycotted the 1947 North-West Frontier Province referendum for merging the province into Pakistan.

=== 2022 Pashtun National Jirga ===
On 11–14 March 2022, the Pashtun National Jirga was held at Mirakhel in Bannu in order to defend the rights of the Pashtun people in the country. The critical issues which were faced by the Pashtuns were discussed during the jirga in a bid to suggest solutions to them.

== Geography ==
=== Climate ===
Bannu has a hot semi-arid climate (Köppen BSh) featuring sweltering summers and mild winters. The average annual temperature is 22.3 °C or 72.1 °F, with the hottest month being June with an average high of 41.5 °C or 106.7 °F and the coolest January with an average low of 2.5 °C or 36.5 °F. The average annual rainfall is 435 millimetres or 17.1 inches, with the majority falling in the monsoon season of July and August, followed by a secondary maximum due to western disturbances from December to March.

Climate data for Bannu
Month	Jan	Feb	Mar	Apr	May	Jun	Jul	Aug	Sep	Oct	Nov	Dec	Year
Mean daily maximum °C (°F)	17.5 (63.5)	20.0 (68.0)	25.5 (77.9)	32.5 (90.5)	39.3 (102.7)	41.5 (106.7)	37.5 (99.5)	36.0 (96.8)	35.0 (95.0)	31.0 (87.8)	24.5 (76.1)	18.5 (65.3)	29.9 (85.8)
Daily mean °C (°F)	10.0 (50.0)	12.2 (54.0)	17.0 (62.6)	23.8 (74.8)	30.6 (87.1)	34.8 (94.6)	32.6 (90.7)	31.2 (88.2)	28.6 (83.5)	22.3 (72.1)	14.9 (58.8)	9.8 (49.6)	22.3 (72.2)
Mean daily minimum °C (°F)	2.5 (36.5)	4.5 (40.1)	8.5 (47.3)	15.0 (59.0)	22.0 (71.6)	27.5 (81.5)	25.5 (77.9)	24.5 (76.1)	19.5 (67.1)	12.0 (53.6)	5.5 (41.9)	2.0 (35.6)	14.1 (57.4)
Average rainfall mm (inches)	45 (1.8)	50 (2.0)	60 (2.4)	20 (0.8)	10 (0.4)	10 (0.4)	95 (3.7)	85 (3.3)	15 (0.6)	5 (0.2)	10 (0.4)	30 (1.2)	435 (17.2)
Source 1: Climate-Data.org
Source 2: World Weather Online

== Demographics ==
=== Population ===
Historical Population
Year	Pop.	±% p.a.
1881	8,960	—
1891	8,817	−0.16%
1901	14,291	+4.95%
1911	16,865	+1.67%
1921	22,261	+2.81%
1931	30,539	+3.21%
1941	38,504	+2.34%
1951	27,199	−3.42%
1961	31,623	+1.52%
1972	43,757	+3.00%
1981	43,210	−0.14%
1998	47,676	+0.58%
2017	49,965	+0.25%
2023	41,015	−3.24%

As of the 2023 census, Bannu had a population of 41,015.

=== Religion ===
Religious groups in Bannu City (1881−2023) (Note: 1881-1941: Data for the entirety of the town of Bannu, which included Bannu Municipality and Bannu Cantonment. 2017-2023: Urban population of Bannu Tehsil.)
Religious group	1881		1891		1901		1911		1921		1931		1941		2017		2023	
Religious group	Pop.	%	Pop.	%	Pop.	%	Pop.	%	Pop.	%	Pop.	%	Pop.	%	Pop.	%	Pop.	%
Hinduism (Note: 1931-1941: Including Ad-Dharmis)	4,284	47.81%	4,519	51.25%	7,080	49.54%	7,714	45.74%	13,222	59.4%	15,036	49.24%	22,175	57.59%	208	0.42%	116	0.24%
Islam	4,110	45.87%	3,720	42.19%	5,730	40.1%	6,340	37.59%	6,376	28.64%	10,607	34.73%	10,696	27.78%	48,434	96.97%	46,675	97.05%
Sikhism	503	5.61%	537	6.09%	1,354	9.47%	2,585	15.33%	2,421	10.88%	3,947	12.92%	4,894	12.71%	—N/a	—N/a	0	0%
Jainism	0	0%	8	0.09%	2	0.01%	0	0%	0	0%	0	0%	—N/a	—N/a	—N/a	—N/a	—N/a	—N/a
Christianity	—N/a	—N/a	33	0.37%	125	0.87%	226	1.34%	242	1.09%	949	3.11%	467	1.21%	1,264	2.53%	1,272	2.64%
Zoroastrianism	—N/a	—N/a	0	0%	0	0%	0	0%	0	0%	0	0%	0	0%	—N/a	—N/a	0	0%
Judaism	—N/a	—N/a	0	0%	0	0%	0	0%	0	0%	0	0%	0	0%	—N/a	—N/a	—N/a	—N/a
Buddhism	—N/a	—N/a	—N/a	—N/a	0	0%	0	0%	0	0%	0	0%	—N/a	—N/a	—N/a	—N/a	—N/a	—N/a
Ahmadiyya	—N/a	—N/a	—N/a	—N/a	—N/a	—N/a	—N/a	—N/a	—N/a	—N/a	—N/a	—N/a	—N/a	—N/a	27	0.05%	0	0%
Others	63	0.7%	0	0%	0	0%	0	0%	0	0%	0	0%	232	0.6%	15	0.03%	33	0.07%
Total population	8,960	100%	8,817	100%	14,291	100%	16,865	100%	22,261	100%	30,539	100%	38,504	100%	49,948	100%	48,096	100%

=== Language ===
Languages by number of speakers in the Bannu district, 2023
1. Pashto (99.1%)
2. Urdu (0.33%)
3. Punjabi (0.32%)
4. Other (0.25%)

=== Tribes ===
The following Pashtun and non-Pashtun tribes are settled in Bannu, with Banusi and Wazir being the major ones:

- Banusi (Shitak)
- Sulaimankhel
- Wazir
- Sayyed
- Bangash
- Mughal Khel
- Khattak
- Marwat, and various other small tribes

== Education ==
The first public sector university, University of Science and Technology, Bannu, opened in 2005. Bannu also has a medical college, Bannu Medical College, and a campus of University of Engineering and Technology, Peshawar. The oldest and most renowned public sector institution is Government Post-Graduate College Bannu, which started operating in 1951.

The following is a list of some of the public and private universities and colleges in Bannu:

- University of Science and Technology, Bannu
- Sarhad University Bannu Campus
- Kalam Bibi International Women Institute
- Bannu Medical College
- Government College of Nursing Bannu
- Akram Khan Durrani School and College
- Bannu Law College
- Government College of Management Sciences, Bannu
- FG Degree College for Women, Bannu Cantt
- Bannu Degree College No.1
- Bannu Polytechnic Institute
- Army Public School and College, Bannu
- Government Degree College No.2
- Government Post-Graduate College Bannu
- University of Engineering and Technology Peshawar, Bannu Campus

== Notable people ==
- Murad Jehan, International Volleyball Player, Current captain of Pakistan Volleyball Team
- Fereydun, Iranian mythical king and hero from the Pishdadian dynasty
- Zahid Akram Durrani, Deputy Speaker of the National Assembly of Pakistan
- Peter Gracey (1921–2006), English cricketer
- Abdul Hamid (field hockey), Former Olympian and Ex Secretary General Pakistan Hockey Federation
- Abdul Rashid (field hockey, born 1947), Former Olympian
- Ghulam Ishaq Khan, Former President of Islamic Republic of Pakistan
- Baitullah Mehsud, Founder and Prominent Leader of Tehreek-i-Taliban Pakistan
- Maria Toorpakai, International Female Squash Player
- Qazi Mohib, Former Olympian and Ex Captain Pakistan Hockey Team
- Akram Khan Durrani, Former Chief Minister of Khyber Pakhtunkhwa
- Dr. Qibla Ayaz, chairman, Pakistan Council of Islamic Ideology
- Harbans Kapoor, Former Member of the Uttarakhand Legislative Assembly
- Shah Muhammad Wazir, Member of Khyber Pakhtunkhwa Assembly
- Subhan Qureshi, Biologist, Founder and Chief Patron of Dairy Science Park
- Ayesha Gulalai Wazir, Former Member of the National Assembly of Pakistan
- Dost Muhammad Khan, Former Chief Justice of Supreme Court of Pakistan
- Zakir Khan, International Cricket Player
- Nasir Iqbal, International Squash Player
- Khushdil Shah, International Cricket Player
- Sadia Gul, International Female Squash Player
- Zartaj Gul Wazir, Former Minister of Climate Change of Pakistan
- Ghazi Sial, Renowned Poet and Pashto Folk Songs Writer
- Jaman Lal Sharma, Former Indian Field Hockey Player
- Baz Muhammad Khan, Ex Senator
- Muhammad Ibrahim Khan (Pakistani senator), Ex Senator

== See also ==
- Bannu District
- Bannu Division
- List of cities in Khyber Pakhtunkhwa by population
- Mirzali Khan
- Ghoriwala
- Waziristan
- Bannu Resolution
- Pashtun National Jirga
- Spin Tangi(Hathi Khel) Massacre
