= Akram Khan Durrani =

Pakistani politician

- اکرم خان درانی

Minister for Housing and Works
- In office 4 August 2017 – 31 May 2018
- President: Mamnoon Hussain
- Prime Minister: Shahid Khaqan Abbasi
- In office 19 June 2013 – 28 July 2017
- President: Mamnoon Hussain
- Prime Minister: Nawaz Sharif

23rd Chief Minister of the North-West Frontier Province
- In office 29 September 2002 – 11 October 2007
- Preceded by: Mehtab Ahmed Khan
- Succeeded by: Shamsul Mulk (caretaker)

Member of the National Assembly of Pakistan
- In office 1 June 2013 – 31 May 2018
- Constituency: NA-26 (Bannu)

Leader of Opposition in the Provincial Assembly of Khyber Pakhtunkhwa
- In office 2 October 2018 – 18 January 2023
- Preceded by: Maulana Lutfur Rehman
- Succeeded by: Ibadullah Khan

Member of the Provincial Assembly of Khyber Pakhtunkhwa
- In office 13 August 2018 – 18 January 2023
- Constituency: PK-90 (Bannu-IV)

Personal details
- Born: Akram Khan Durrani; 2 March 1960 (age 66) Bannu, Khyber Pakhtunkhwa, Pakistan
- Party: JUI (F) (2002-present)
- Relations: Ghulam Qadir Khan Durrani (father)
- Children: Zahid Akram Durrani (son) Ziad Durrani (son)

Akram Khan Durrani (Urdu: اکرم خان درانی, Pashto: اکرم خان دراني; born 2 March 1960) is a Pakistani politician who was the Leader of the Opposition in the Provincial Assembly of Khyber Pakhtunkhwa, in office from 2 October 2018 till 18 January 2023. He previously served as the Chief Minister of Khyber Pakhtunkhwa from 2002 to 2007. He served as Federal Minister for Housing and Works, in the Abbasi cabinet from August 2017 to May 2018 and as the Federal Minister for Housing and Works in the third Sharif ministry from June 2013 to July 2017. He was a member of the National Assembly of Pakistan from June 2013 to May 2018 from NA-26 (Bannu).

== Early life ==
Durrani was born on 2 March 1960. He belongs to Mewa Khel, a sub-tribe of the Durrani Pashtuns residing in Surrani, Bannu.

== Political career ==
Durrani was elected several times to the provincial assembly of Khyber Pakhtunkhwa from his home constituency of Bannu. In September 2002, he was elected by the Muttahida Majlis-e-Amal (MMA) as the Chief Minister of Khyber Pakhtunkhwa where he served until 2007. He survived an assassination attempt in 2007 when he was the chief minister.

In the 2013 Pakistani general election he was elected as the member of the National Assembly of Pakistan. He also won provincial assembly seat which he relinquished in order to retain his national assembly seat.

Durrani was appointed as Minister for Housing & Works by the President of Pakistan Mamnoon Hussain on the advice of Prime Minister Nawaz Sharif on 29 August 2013.

On 27 November 2015, Durrani survived an attempt on his life as his convoy came under a bomb attack in Narmikhail area of Bannu.

He had ceased to hold ministerial office in July 2017 when the federal cabinet was disbanded following the resignation of Prime Minister Nawaz Sharif after Panama Papers case decision. Following the election of Shahid Khaqan Abbasi as Prime Minister of Pakistan in August 2017, he was inducted into the federal cabinet of Abbasi. He was appointed as the Minister for Housing and Works for the second time. Upon the dissolution of the National Assembly on the expiration of its term on 31 May 2018, Durrani ceased to hold the office as Federal Minister for Housing and Works.

On 13 July 2018, Durrani remained safe despite a blast near his convoy that killed four people and injured 32 others.

He was re-elected to Provincial Assembly of Khyber Pakhtunkhwa as a candidate of MMA from Constituency PK-90 (Bannu-IV) in the 2018 Pakistani general election.

On 2 October 2018, he became leader of the opposition in the Provincial Assembly of Khyber Pakhtunkhwa.

== Chief Minister Khyber Pakhtunkhwa ==
Akram Khan Durrani remained Chief Minister of Khyber Pakhtunkhwa from 2002 to 2007. One of his work was that he declared the 'Girl campus of Khyber Medical College' as an independent medical college by name Khyber Girls Medical College.

Political offices
Preceded by Mehtab Ahmed Khan	Chief Minister of Khyber-Pakhtunkhwa; 2002 – 2007	Succeeded by Shamsul Mulk
