= Bannu District =

District in Pakistan

District Bannu ضلع بنوں بنو ولسوالۍ
- District
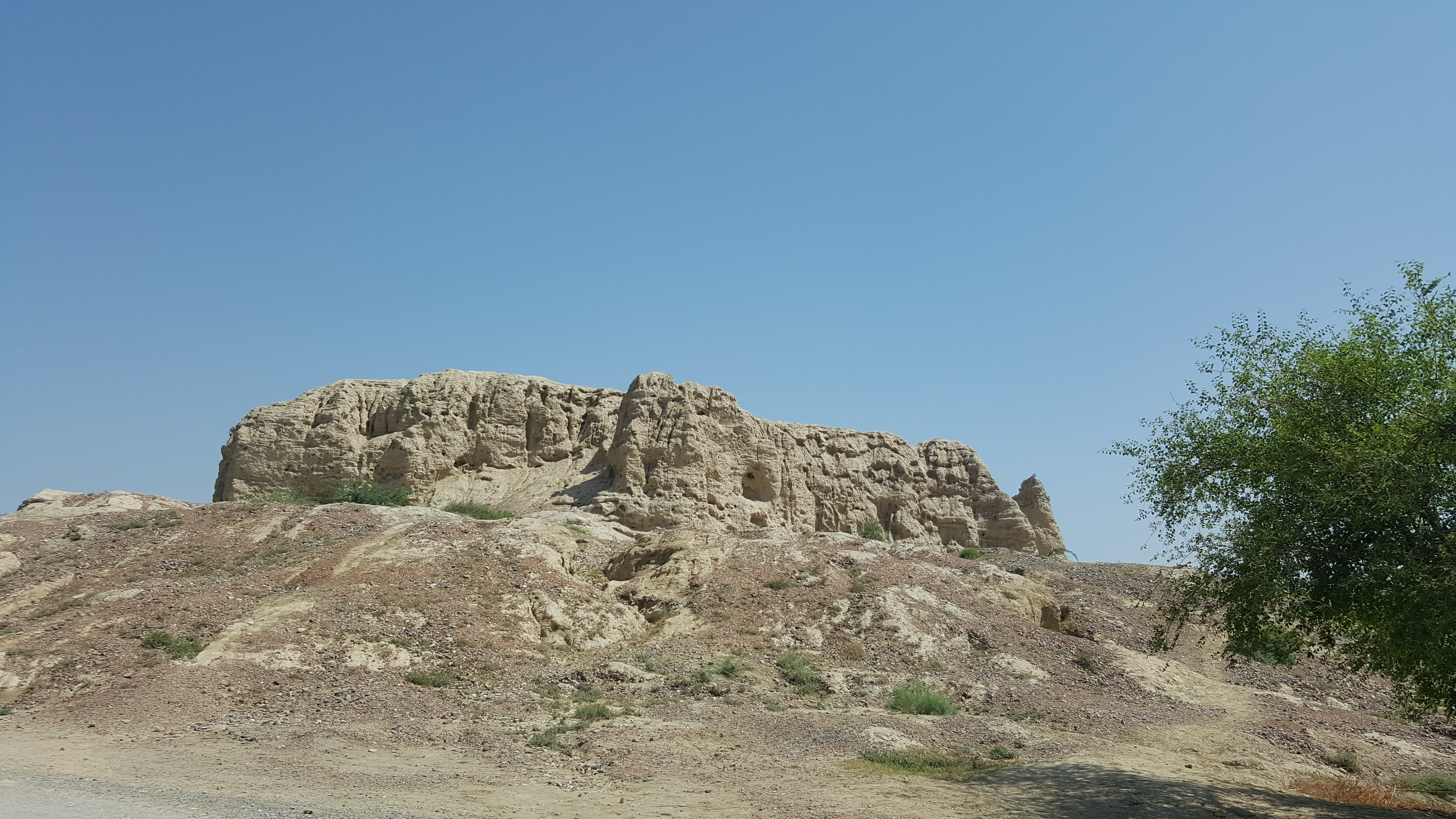
- Mound at Akra

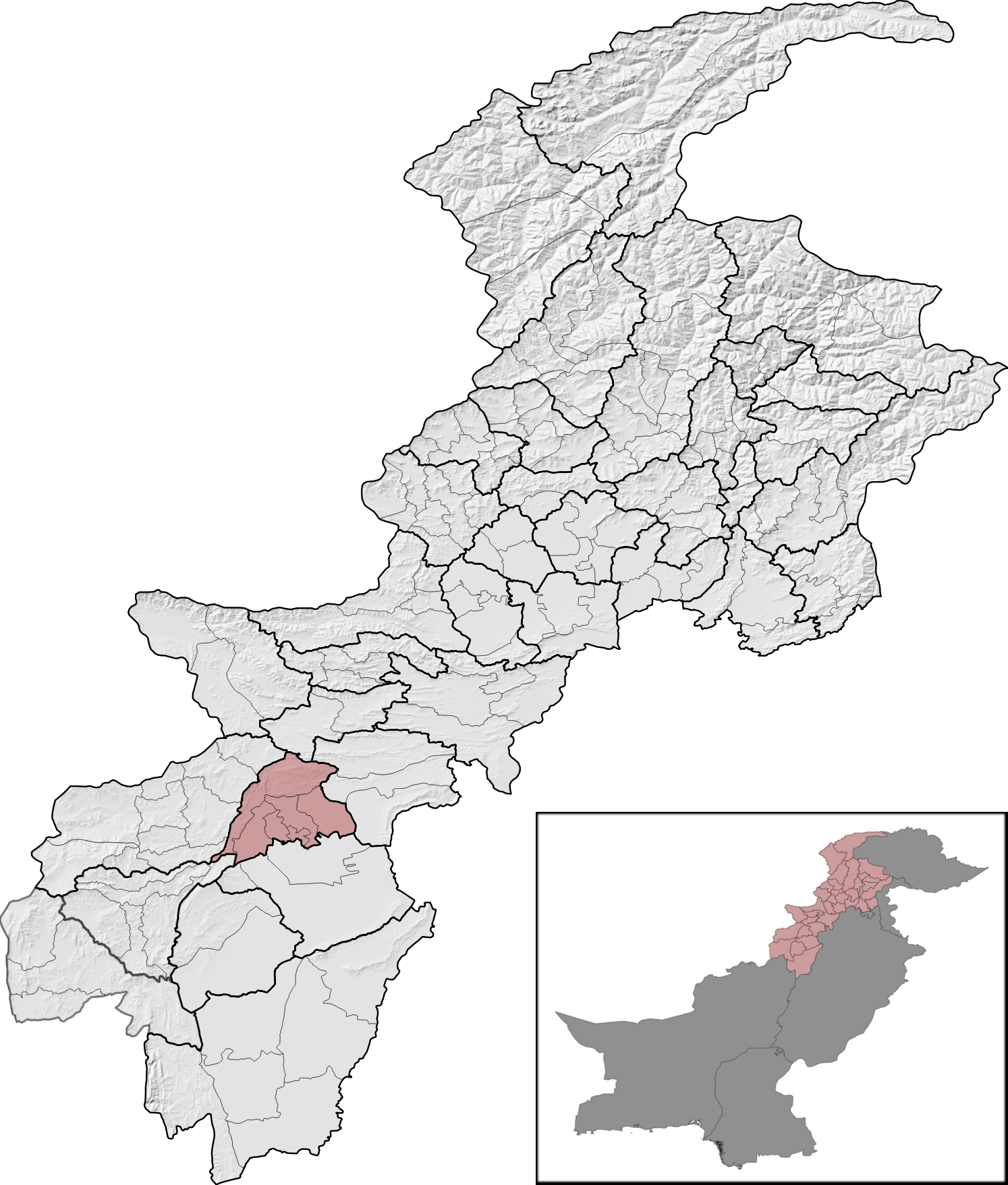
- Bannu District (red) in Khyber Pakhtunkhwa
- Country: Pakistan
- Province: Khyber Pakhtunkhwa
- Division: Bannu
- Headquarters: Bannu

Government
  - Type: District Administration
  - Deputy Commissioner: Mohammad Khan Bangash
  - Member of National Assambley: Mualana Nasim Ali Shah
  - District Health Officer: N/A

Area
  - Total: 1,972 km^{2} (761 sq mi)

Population (2023)
  - Total: 1,357,890
  - Density: 688.6/km^{2} (1,783/sq mi)
  - Urban: 48,398
  - Rural: 1,309,492

Literacy
  - Literacy rate: Total: 41.75%; Male: 58.47%; Female: 23.84%
- Time zone: UTC+5 (PST)
- Number of Tehsils: 5
- Website: bannu.kp.gov.pk

Bannu District (Pashto: بنو ولسوالۍ, Urdu: ضلع بنوں) is a district in the Bannu Division of Khyber Pakhtunkhwa, Pakistan. Its status as a district was formally recorded in 1861 during the British Raj.

Cloth weaving, sugar mills and the manufacturing of cotton fabrics, machinery and equipment are the major industries in Bannu. It is also known for its weekly Jumma fair.

== Geography ==
District borders North Waziristan to the northwest, Karak to the northeast, Lakki Marwat and Bettani to the southeast, and South Waziristan to the southwest. It is represented in the provincial assembly by four MPAs. It is surrounded by rugged and dry mountains, it is a fertile place, and early English visitors had been known to refer to it as a "paradise" – see the description by Edwardes quoted by Thornton.

The district forms a basin drained by the Kurram River, Gambila River and Tochi river which originate in the hills of Waziristan. Extending its reach to the base of the frontier hills, the Bannu Valley unfolds as an asymmetrical oval, spanning 60 miles (97 km) from north to south and 40 miles (64 km) from east to west.

== History ==
The history of Bannu goes back to prehistoric times due to its strategic location. Notably, Sheri Khan Tarakai is an ancient settlement site located in the Bannu District. Here, remnants bear witness to the presence of the most ancient village settlement within the Bannu region. This site witnessed occupation from the late fifth century to the early third millennium BC.

The sacred texts of Zend Avesta and Vendidad mentions Varəna, the Avestan predecessor of the name for Bannu, as one of the sixteen most beautiful and perfect lands created by Ahura Mazda. Bannu is the homeland and birthplace of Fereydun.

Malik Dilasa Khan had also fought a successful battle against the Sikh Empire. in which he killed one of the prominent Sikh Military commander Jai Singh Atariwala in the Battle of Bannu.

=== British era (1849–1947) ===
Bannu District was annexed by the British from its former Sikh rulers after the Second Anglo-Sikh War of 1848–1849. After the British annexation of Punjab, then including parts of the North-West Frontier Province (NWFP), the valley was administered by Herbert Edwardes. In 1857 revolt the valley was peaceful, it was subject to incursions from the Waziri tribes of the Tochi Valley and the neighbouring hills. The primary export of the region was wheat, Salt and alum were also quarried at Kalabagh.

As of 1911, the Indus had no bridges within the district, but was navigable for local boats throughout its course of 76 mi (122 km).

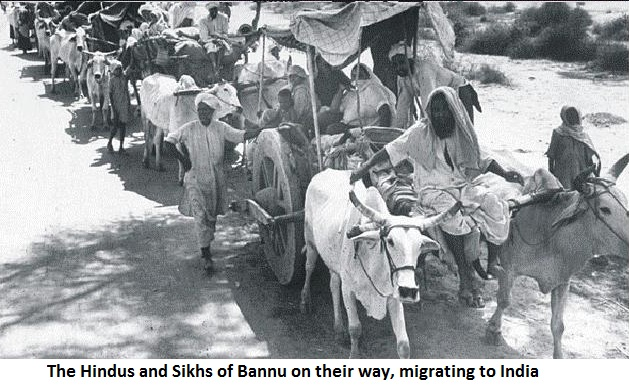
Hindus and Sikhs of Bannu migrating to India during the partition of 1947.

=== Jirga ===
==== Bannu Jirga (1947) ====
On 21 June 1947 in Bannu, a jirga was held by Pashtun leaders including Bacha Khan, his brother Chief Minister Dr Khan Sahib, the Khudai Khidmatgars, members of the Provincial Assembly, Mirzali Khan (Faqir of Ipi), and other tribal chiefs, just seven weeks before the Partition of India. The jirga declared the Bannu Resolution, which demanded that the Pashtuns be given a choice to have an independent state of Pashtunistan composing all Pashtun territories of British India, instead of being made to join either India or Pakistan. However, the British Raj refused to comply with the demand of this resolution, in response to which the Khudai Khidmatgars boycotted the 1947 North-West Frontier Province referendum for merging the province into Pakistan.

==== Pashtun National Jirga (2022) ====
On 11–14 March 2022, the Pashtun National Jirga was held at Mirakhel in Bannu District in order to defend the rights of the Pashtun people in the country. The critical issues which were faced by the Pashtuns were discussed during the jirga in a bid to suggest solutions to them.

== Administrative subdivisions ==
Bannu District is divided into 6 Tehsils and 46 union councils.

Tehsil	Name (Urdu)	Area (km²)	Pop. (2023)	Density (ppl/km²) (2023)	Literacy rate (2023)	Union Councils
Baka Khel Tehsil	(Urdu: تحصیل بکاخیل) (Pashto: بکاخېل تحصیل)	367	192,797	107.84	28.25%	
Bannu Tehsil	(Urdu: تحصیل بنوں) (Pashto: بنو تحصیل)	228	644,909	106.97	49.46%	
Domel Tehsil	(Urdu: تحصیل ڈومیل) (Pashto: ډومیل تحصیل)	425	224,428	115.54	41.38%	
Kakki Tehsil	(Urdu: تحصیل ککی) (Pashto: ککي تحصیل)	66	92,021	109.01	42.62%	
Miryan Tehsil	(Urdu: تحصیل میریان) (Pashto: میریان تحصیل)	141	166,473	1,180.66	31.77%	
Wazir Tehsil		745	37,262	50.02	16.33%	

== Provincial and National Assembly Seats ==
The district has 4 Provincial Seats in the Khyber-Pakhtunkhwa Assembly while it has 1 seat in National Assembly.

=== National Assembly ===
- NA-39 (Bannu)

Election	Member	Party
2002	Maulana Syed Nasib Ali Shah	MMA
2008	Maulana Fazal-ur-Rehman	MMA
2013	Akram Khan Durrani	JUI (F)
2018	Imran Khan	PTI
2018 (by-election)	Zahid Akram Durrani	MMA

=== Provincial Assembly ===
Member of Provincial Assembly	Party Affiliation	Constituency	Year
Sher Azam Khan	Pakistan Peoples Party Parliamentarians	Bannu-I	2018
Pakhtoon Yar Khan	Pakistan Tehreek-e-Insaf	Bannu-II	2018
Shah Muhammad Khan	Pakistan Tehreek-e-Insaf	Bannu-III	2018
Akram Khan Durrani	Muttahida Majlis-e-Amal	Bannu-IV	2018

== Demographics ==
Historical population
Year	Pop.	±% p.a.
1972	392,468	—
1981	485,240	+2.39%
1998	695,260	+2.14%
2017	1,210,183	+2.96%
2023	1,357,890	+1.94%

As of the 2023 census, Bannu district has 183,130 households and a population of 1,357,890. The district has a sex ratio of 108.33 males to 100 females and a literacy rate of 41.75%: 58.47% for males and 23.84% for females. 445,307 (32.87% of the surveyed population) are under 10 years of age. 48,398 (3.56%) live in urban areas.

=== Religion ===
Religion in contemporary Bannu District
Religious group	1941		2017		2023	
Religious group	Pop.	%	Pop.	%	Pop.	%
Islam	157,097	83.74%	1,208,054	99.82%	1,349,359	99.61%
Hinduism	24,517	13.07%	275	0.02%	279	0.02%
Sikhism	5,285	2.82%	—N/a	—N/a	22	~0%
Christianity	467	0.25%	1,494	0.12%	4,844	0.36%
Others	232	0.12%	360	0.04%	170	0.01%
Total Population	187,598	100%	1,210,183	100%	1,354,674 (Note: Different from official population figure since it excludes sensitive areas where religion was not asked)	100%
Note: 1941 census data is for Bannu tehsil of erstwhile Bannu district, which roughly corresponds to contemporary Bannu district sans the former Frontier Region of Bannu. District and tehsil borders have changed since 1941.

Religious groups in Bannu District (British North-West Frontier Province era)
Religious group	1881		1891		1901		1911		1921		1931		1941	
Religious group	Pop.	%	Pop.	%	Pop.	%	Pop.	%	Pop.	%	Pop.	%	Pop.	%
Islam	301,002	90.51%	337,269	90.6%	206,429	89.18%	225,374	90.12%	219,695	89.04%	237,674	87.93%	257,648	87.06%
Hinduism	30,643	9.21%	33,832	9.09%	22,178	9.58%	20,721	8.29%	23,509	9.53%	26,181	9.69%	31,471	10.63%
Sikhism	790	0.24%	1,062	0.29%	2,673	1.15%	3,746	1.5%	3,286	1.33%	5,482	2.03%	6,112	2.07%
Christianity	82	0.02%	58	0.02%	183	0.08%	245	0.1%	244	0.1%	964	0.36%	699	0.24%
Jainism	60	0.02%	55	0.01%	22	0.01%	0	0%	0	0%	0	0%	0	0%
Zoroastrianism	0	0%	0	0%	0	0%	0	0%	0	0%	0	0%	0	0%
Buddhism	0	0%	0	0%	0	0%	0	0%	0	0%	0	0%	0	0%
Judaism	—N/a	—N/a	0	0%	0	0%	0	0%	0	0%	0	0%	0	0%
Others	0	0%	0	0%	0	0%	0	0%	0	0%	0	0%	0	0%
Total population	332,577	100%	372,276	100%	231,485	100%	250,086	100%	246,734	100%	270,301	100%	295,930	100%
Note1: British North-West Frontier Province era district borders are not an exact match in the present-day due to various bifurcations to district borders — which since created new districts — throughout the region during the post-independence era that have taken into account population increases. Note2: Population decrease noted between 1891 census and 1901 census due to the creation of British North-West Frontier Province, bifurcating from British Punjab province. The trans-Indus tract of Bannu district was allotted to the newly formed North-West Frontier Province, the cis-Indus tract remaining in the Punjab jurisdiction. The cis-Indus portions of the Dera Ismail Khan and the Bannu districts would comprise the new Punjab district of Mianwali.

=== Language ===
Languages by number of speakers in the Bannu city, 1881
1. Pashto (52.8%)
2. Punjabi (46.7%)
3. Hindustani (0.33%)
4. Other (0.19%)

Pashto is the predominant language, spoken by 99.09% of the population.

== Universities in Bannu ==
District Bannu has two Universities with one i.e University of Science & Technology, Bannu (USTB), founded in 2005 by Mr. Akram Khan Durrani, the then Chief Minister, has a full degree awarding status and another one as a campus of the University of Engineering & Technology (UET), Peshawar. USTB offers a wide variety of courses in Science, Engineering and Arts subjects at Bachelors, Master and PhD level. These universities host students from District Bannu, the neighboring districts of Lakki Marwat, Karak, Waziristan as well as from all over Pakistan.

== See also ==
- Khyber Pakhtunkhwa
