= Bannu Division =

Bannu Division بنوں ڈویژن بنو څانګه
- Division
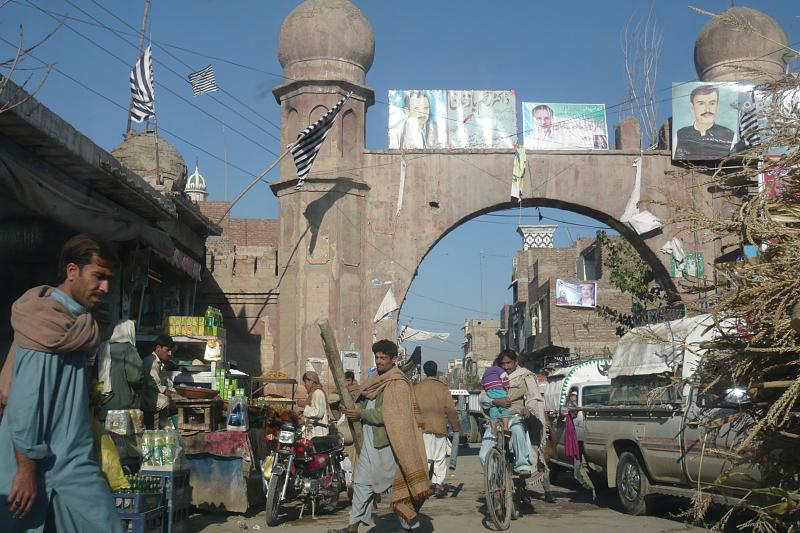
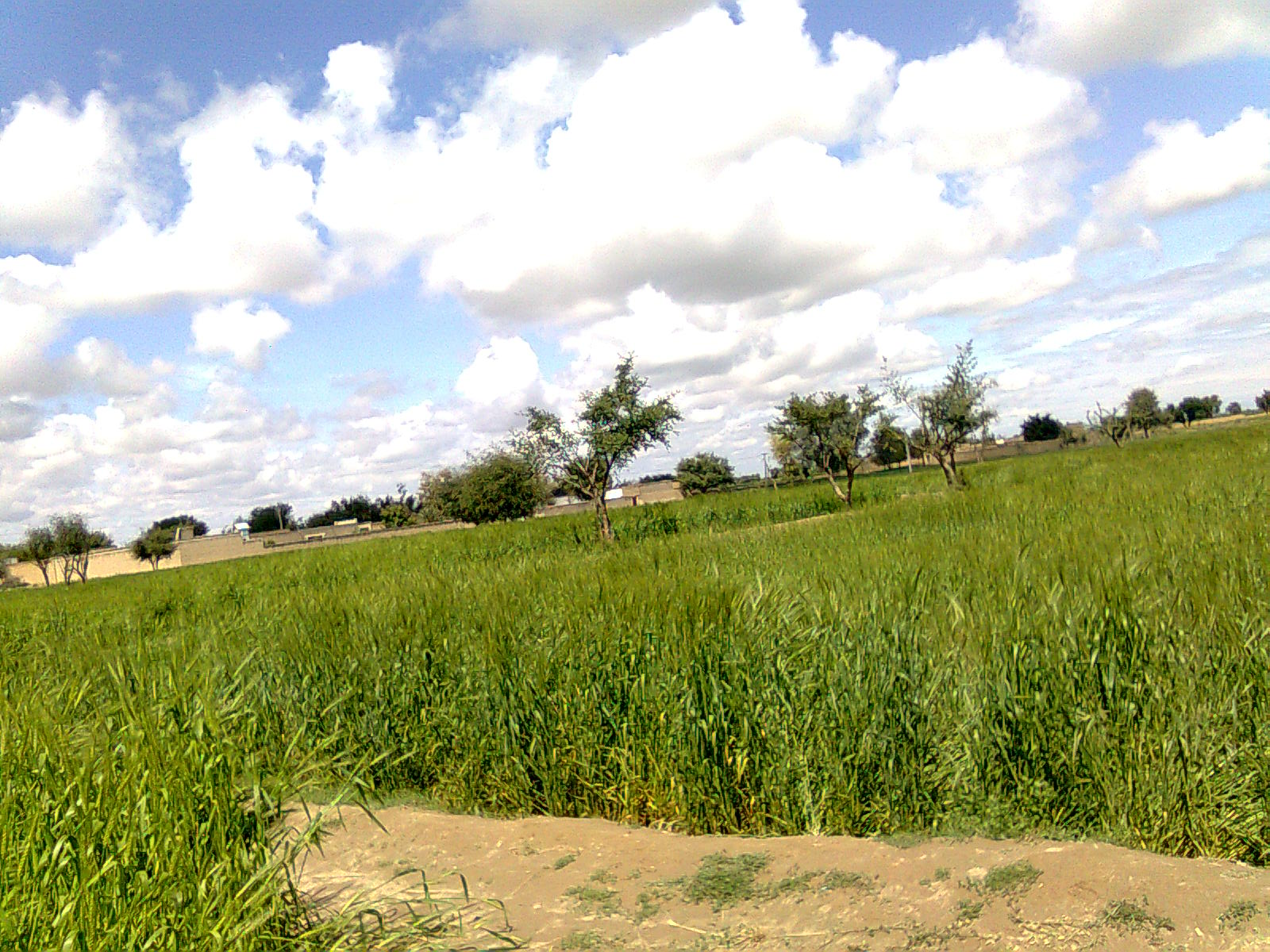
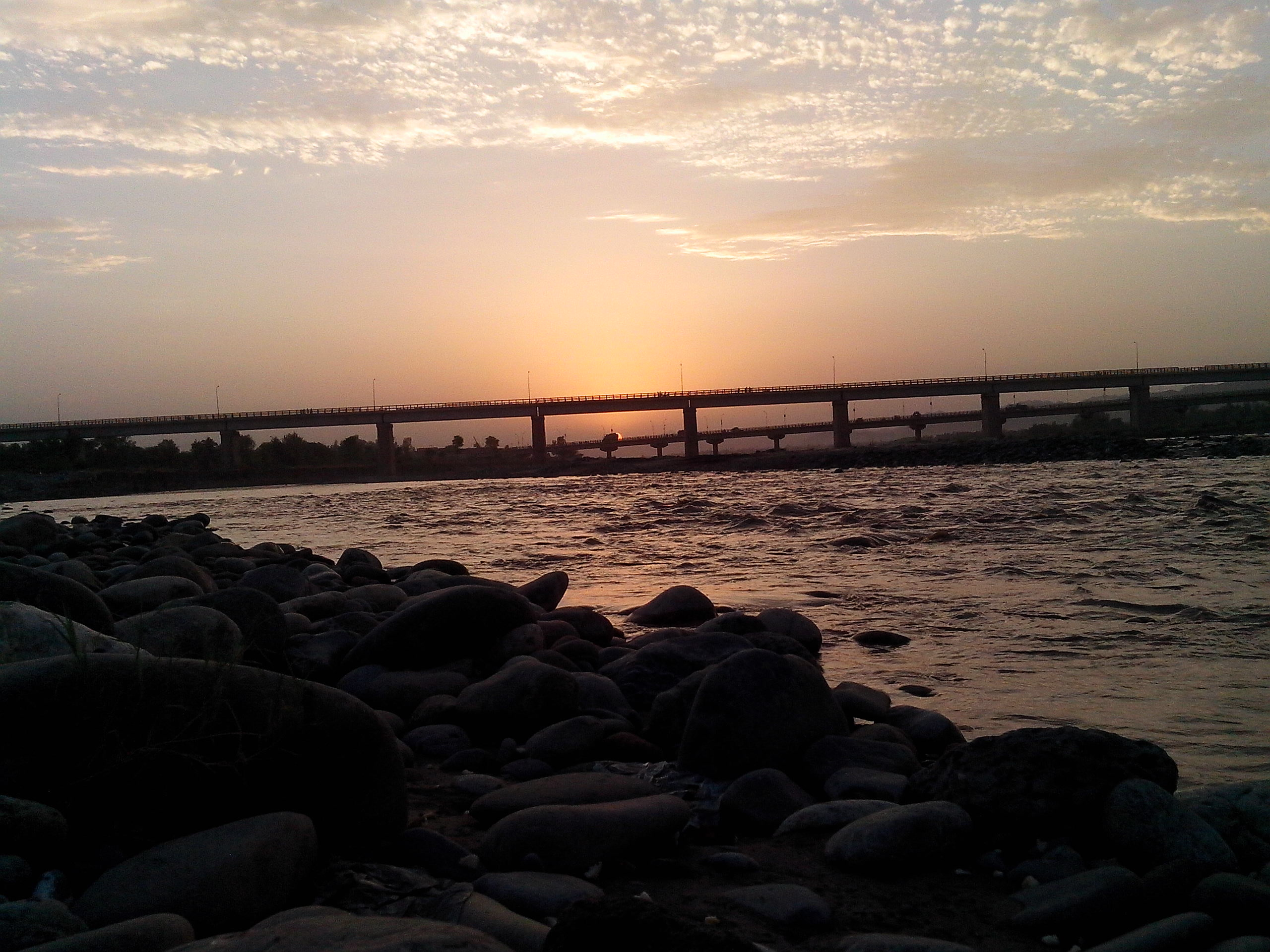
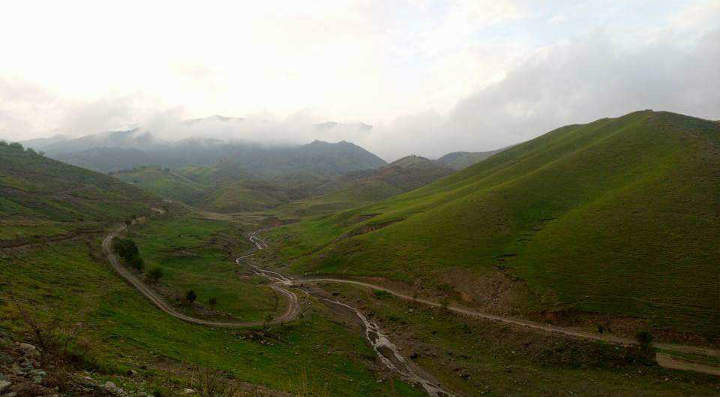
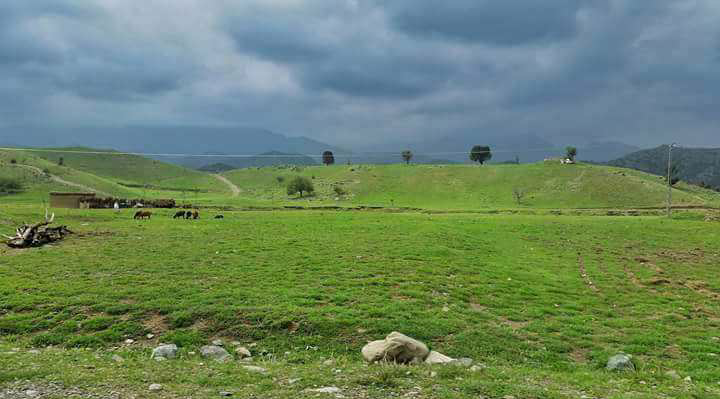
- Images, from top down, left to right: The city of Bannu; A village in Lakki Marwat District; The Kurram River at Bannu; A scene in North Waziristan; Another scene in North Waziristan

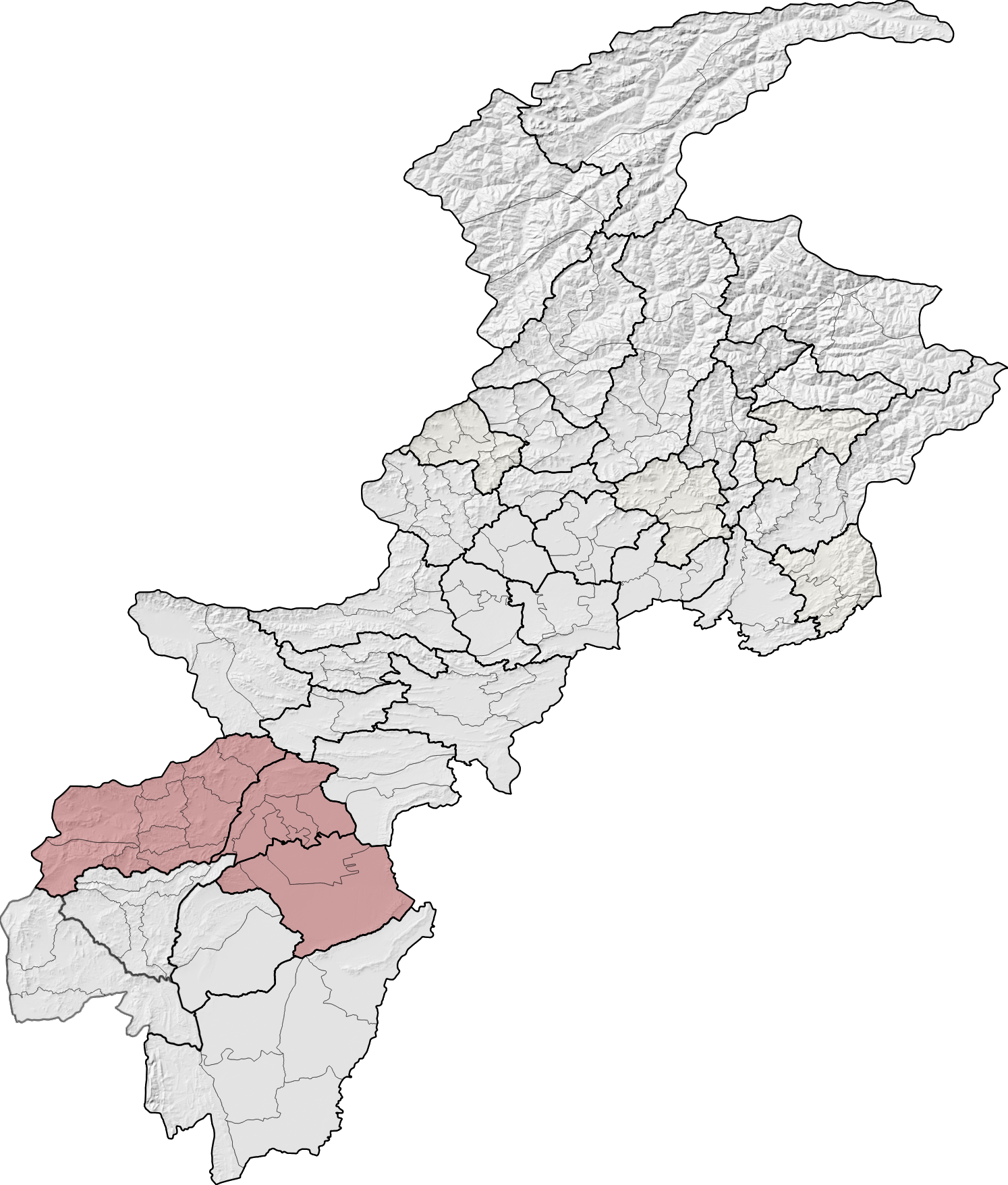
- Bannu Division (red) in Khyber Pakhtunkhwa
- Coordinates: 32°40′00″N 70°36′00″E
- Country: Pakistan
- Province: Khyber Pakhtunkhwa

Government
  - Type: Divisional Administration
  - Commissioner: Parwaiz Sabatkhel (BPS-20 PCS)
  - Regional Police Officer: Syed Ashfaq Anwar (BPS-20 PSP)

Area^{A}
  - Division: 9,975 km^{2} (3,851 sq mi)

Population (2023 Pakistani Census) ^{A}
  - Division: 3,092,078
  - Density: 310.0/km^{2} (802.9/sq mi)
  - Urban: 155,618 (5.03%)
  - Rural: 2,936,460

Native Speakers
  - Speakers: Largest: Pashto (99.41%); Others: Urdu (0.18%)

Literacy
  - Literacy rate: Total: (42.11%); Male: (58.98 %); Female: (24.34%)
- Time zone: UTC+5 (PST)
- National Assembly Seats (2018): Total (3) ^{B}: PTI (1); MMA (1); Indep. (1)
- Khyber Pakhtunkhwa Assembly Seats (2018): Total (9): PTI (4); MMA (3); PPP (1); Indep. (1)
- Website: cbd.kp.gov.pk

Bannu Division is one of seven divisions in Pakistan's Khyber Pakhtunkhwa province. It consists of three districts: Bannu, Lakki Marwat, and North Waziristan. The division borders Dera Ismail Khan Division to the south and west, Kohat Division to the north and east, and the province of Punjab, Pakistan to its east. CNIC code of Bannu Division is 11.

== List of the Districts ==
Districts are the administrative unit one level below divisions in the administrative hierarchy of Pakistan. Bannu Division consists of the following three districts: Bannu, Lakki Marwat, and North Waziristan.

#	District	Headquarter	Area (km^{2})	Pop. (2023)	Density (ppl/km^{2}) (2023)	Lit. rate (2023)
1	North Waziristan	Miranshah	4,707	693,332	147.3	32.82%
2	Bannu	Bannu	1,972	1,357,890	688.6	41.75%
3	Lakki Marwat	Lakki Marwat	3,296	1,040,856	315.8	48.47%

== List of the Tehsils ==
#	Tehsil	Area (km^{2})	Pop. (2023)	Density (ppl/km^{2}) (2023)	Lit. rate (2023)	Districts
1	Baka Khel Tehsil	367	192,797	107.84		Bannu District
2	Bannu Tehsil	228	644,909	106.97		Bannu District
3	Domel Tehsil	425	224,428	115.54		Bannu District
4	Kakki Tehsil	66	92,021	109.01		Bannu District
5	Miryan Tehsil	141	166,473	1,180.66		Bannu District
6	Wazir Tehsil	745	37,262	50.02		Bannu District
7	Bettani Tehsil	132	35,571	269.48		Lakki Marwat District
8	Ghazni Khel Tehsil	1,153	329,775	286.01		Lakki Marwat District
9	Lakki Marwat Tehsil	1,388	341,693	246.18		Lakki Marwat District
10	Sari Naurang Tehsil	623	333,817	535.82		Lakki Marwat District
11	Datta Khel Tehsil	1,807	92,196	100.53		North Waziristan District
12	Dossali Tehsil	250	50,524	100.29		North Waziristan District
13	Gharyum Tehsil	320	18,931	102.01		North Waziristan District
14	Ghulam Khan Tehsil	191	31,015	99.33		North Waziristan District
15	Mir Ali Tehsil	605	229,647	107.7		North Waziristan District
16	Miran Shah Tehsil	402	123,317	102.02		North Waziristan District
17	Razmak Tehsil	191	49,367	134.63		North Waziristan District
18	Shewa Tehsil	393	44,126	112.28		North Waziristan District
19	Spinwam Tehsil	548	54,209	99.82		North Waziristan District

== History ==
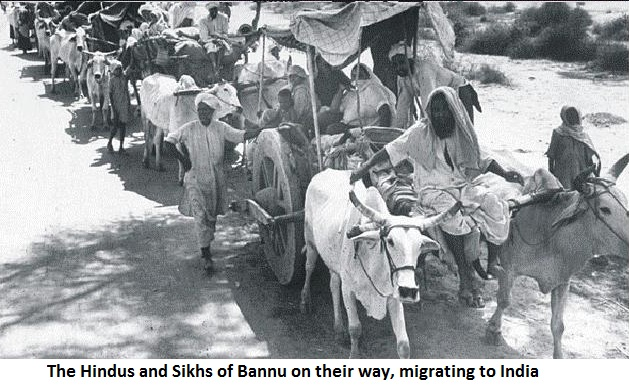
Hindus and Sikhs of Bannu migrating to India during the partition of 1947.

In 1941, the area which today covers the division (excluding North Waziristan), was known as Bannu District. The Bannu District was one of five trans Indus districts in the North West Frontier Province of British India, and it was split into the tehsils of Bannu and Marwat. Here is a description of the area given by the Imperial Gazetteer of India.

One of the four trans-Indus Districts of the North-West Frontier Province, lying between 32° 16'N and 33°5′N and between 70°23'E and 71°16′E, with an area of 1,670 square miles. The District forms a basin drained by two rivers from the hills of Waziristan, the Kurram River and the Gambila or Tochi, which unite at Lakki and flow into the Indus south of Kalabagh. It is shut in on every side by mountains: on the north by those in the Teri tahsil of Kohat District; on the east by the southern extremity of the Maidani Pahar or Khattak Niazi range and the northern spur of the Marwat range, which separate the District from the Isa Khel tahsil of Mianwali District in the Punjab; on the south-east and south the Marwat and Bhittanni ranges divide it from Dera Ismail Khan; and on the west and north-west lie Waziristan and independent territory inhabited by the Bhittanni tribe. These hills nowhere attain any great height. The highest point of the Maidani range at its centre, near the hamlet and valley of Maidan, has an altitude of only 4,256 feet. The Marwat range culminates in Sheikh Budin, the hill which rises abruptly from its south-west end to a height of 4,516 feet, and forms the summer retreat for this District and Dera Ismail Khan. From these ranges numerous spurs jut out into the Bannu plains, but no other hills break their level expanse. Of the rivers the larger is the Kurram, which, entering the District at its north-western corner close to Bannu town, runs at first south-east, then south, and finally winds eastward through the Darra Tang or 'narrow gorge' which lies between the extremities of the Maidani Pahar and Marwat ranges. The Tochi river enters the District about 6 miles south of the Kurram and flows in the same direction, gradually drawing closer to it until their streams unite about 6 or 7 miles west of the Darra Tang.

— Imperial Gazetteer of India, v. 6, p. 392.

North Waziristan, on the other hand, was an agency in the province bordering Bannu District. It is also described in the Gazetteer.

Political Agency in the North-West Frontier Province, lying between 32° 45' and 33° 15' N. and 69° 30' and 70° 40' E., with an area of about 2,310 square miles. It is bounded on the north and east by the Districts of Kohāt and Bannu, and on the south by the Shaktu stream, from the point where it enters the latter district Shuidār at its head. From Shuidār the boundary follows the eastern watershed of the Shawāl valley as far as Drenashtar Sar, and then runs north-east along the Durand Line to Kohisar in the country of the Kābul Khel Wazīrs and Biland Khel. The Agency thus comprises four large and fertile valleys: in the north, the Lower Kurram valley between the Kurram Agency on the upper reaches of that river and Bannu District; the Kaitu Valley; Daur in the valley of the Tochi, the most open and fertile of the four; and the Khaisora valley in the south. Between the Kaitu and Tochi lie the Sheratulla and, north of Miram Shāh, the Dande — two barren plains, each about 30 square miles in area. Another plateau, called the Spereghāra, similar to the Sheratulla but smaller, lies between the Kurram and the Kaity. With these exceptions, the valleys are separated by high barren hills. The loftiest peak is Shuidār (11,000 feet), at the western end of the Khaisora valley.

— Imperial Gazetteer of India, v. 24, p. 379.

After independence, Bannu District became a part of the then much larger Dera Ismail Khan Division.

The area received full-fledged division status between the Pakistani censuses of 1981 and 1998, and during the same time period, Lakki Marwat Tehsil (having been renamed from Marwat Tehsil) was also upgraded, to district status (becoming Lakki Marwat District).

In August 2000, Bannu Division was abolished along with every other division in the country, but was reinstated (with all the other divisions of Pakistan) eight years later after the elections of 2008.

In 2018, the 25th Amendment to the Constitution of Pakistan was passed by the Parliament of Pakistan and the Khyber Pakhtunkhwa Assembly. This entirely and fully merged the seven agencies of the Federally Administered Tribal Areas and the six Frontier Regions with the province of Khyber Pakhtunkhwa. With this merger, Bannu Division gained the agency of North Waziristan, which became a district, the Frontier Region Bannu (which was fully merged into Bannu District as Wazir Subdivision), and the Frontier Region Lakki Marwat (which was fully merged into Lakki Marwat District as Bettani Subdivision).

== Geography ==
Bannu Division has a total area of 9,975 km^{2} (3,851 sq mi). North Waziristan District is the largest district in the division, with 4,707 km^{2} (1,817 sq mi) of area, which means it takes up 47% of the area of the entire division! Lakki Marwat District is the second largest district of the division, and it takes up an area of 3,296 km^{2} (1,273 sq mi), or 33 % of the area of the division. Bannu District only has an area of 1,972 km^{2} (761 sq mi), which means it barely takes up a 5th of the division's area.

The important Kurram River (a major tributary of the Indus River) flows through the division, flowing through North Waziristan District, Bannu District (where it flows near the namesake of the division, Bannu), and Lakki Marwat District (where it flows near the largest city in the division, Lakki Marwat), before it exits the division through the border with Punjab, where it will join the Indus.

=== Surrounding areas ===
To Bannu Division's northwest, you will find Kohat Division, to the division's west and southwest, Dera Ismail Khan Division can be found. To the southeast of Bannu Division, is Sargodha Division in the province of Punjab can be found, and Bannu Division borders the country of Afghanistan to its west.

== Demographics ==
Historical Population
Year	Pop.	±% p.a.
1901	231,485	—
1911	394,465	+5.47%
1921	385,593	−0.23%
1931	363,871	−0.58%
1941	398,693	+0.92%
1951	458,194	+1.40%
1961	587,531	+2.52%
1972	881,764	+3.76%
1981	1,099,602	+2.48%
1998	1,553,518	+2.05%
2017	2,656,801	+2.86%

As of the 2023 Census of Pakistan, the division had a population of 3,092,078. roughly equal to the country of Qatar or the US state of Iowa.

Bannu Division had four urbanized areas in 2017, the lowest amount out of any division in the entire province, and its most populous city, Lakki Marwat, had a population of 59,465, and that made it the smallest city in the province that was classified as the largest city of its own division, and it only was the 20th largest city in the entire province. Bannu, the namesake of the division, in Bannu District, was the second-largest city in the division and the 25th largest in the province, with a population of 49,965. The city of Bannu, though, was the largest city in the division, in 1998, but its population stagnated throughout the period of time between 1998 and 2017, growing only 0.25% every year. The other two urbanized areas in the province are the town of Sarai Naurang of Lakki Marwat District, with a population of 29,955, and the only urbanized area in North Waziristan District (and the whole region of Waziristan), Miranshah, which had a population of 4,361 in 2017.

The division has one cantonment, the Bannu Cantonment, adjacent to the city of Bannu which had a population of 8,320, making up the division's entire military population. This made 0.31% of the entire population of the division active military personnel.

Religious groups in Bannu Division (British North-West Frontier Province era)
Religious group	1881		1891		1901		1911		1921		1931		1941	
Religious group	Pop.	%	Pop.	%	Pop.	%	Pop.	%	Pop.	%	Pop.	%	Pop.	%
Islam	301,002	90.51%	337,269	90.6%	206,429	89.18%	225,374	90.12%	219,695	89.04%	237,674	87.93%	257,648	87.06%
Hinduism	30,643	9.21%	33,832	9.09%	22,178	9.58%	20,721	8.29%	23,509	9.53%	26,181	9.69%	31,471	10.63%
Sikhism	790	0.24%	1,062	0.29%	2,673	1.15%	3,746	1.5%	3,286	1.33%	5,482	2.03%	6,112	2.07%
Christianity	82	0.02%	58	0.02%	183	0.08%	245	0.1%	244	0.1%	964	0.36%	699	0.24%
Jainism	60	0.02%	55	0.01%	22	0.01%	0	0%	0	0%	0	0%	0	0%
Zoroastrianism	0	0%	0	0%	0	0%	0	0%	0	0%	0	0%	0	0%
Buddhism	0	0%	0	0%	0	0%	0	0%	0	0%	0	0%	0	0%
Judaism	—N/a	—N/a	0	0%	0	0%	0	0%	0	0%	0	0%	0	0%
Others	0	0%	0	0%	0	0%	0	0%	0	0%	0	0%	0	0%
Total population	332,577	100%	372,276	100%	231,485	100%	250,086	100%	246,734	100%	270,301	100%	295,930	100%
Note: British North-West Frontier Province era figures are for Bannu District, which roughly corresponds to present-day Bannu Division.

== Constituencies ==
Provincial Assembly Constituency	National Assembly Constituency	District
PK-99 Bannu-I	NA-39 Bannu	Bannu
PK-100 Bannu-II	NA-39 Bannu	Bannu
PK-101 Bannu-III	NA-39 Bannu	Bannu
PK-102 Bannu-IV	NA-39 Bannu	Bannu
PK-103 North Waziristan-I	NA-40 North Waziristan	North Waziristan
PK-104 North Waziristan-II	NA-40 North Waziristan	North Waziristan
PK-105 Lakki Marwat-I	NA-41 Lakki Marwat	Lakki Marwat
PK-106 Lakki Marwat-II	NA-41 Lakki Marwat	Lakki Marwat
PK-107 Lakki Marwat-III	NA-41 Lakki Marwat	Lakki Marwat

== See also ==
- Divisions of Pakistan
- Divisions of Khyber Pakhtunkhwa
  - Dera Ismail Khan Division
  - Hazara Division
  - Kohat Division
  - Malakand Division
  - Mardan Division
  - Peshawar Division
- Bannu District
  - Bannu
  - Ghoriwala
  - Bazar Ahmad Khan
- Lakki Marwat District
  - Lakki Marwat
- North Waziristan District
  - Miranshah
  - Waziristan
- Administrative units of Pakistan
- Districts of Khyber Pakhtunkhwa

== Notes ==
A. Before 2018, the North Waziristan Agency (now North Waziristan District), the Frontier Region Bannu, and the Frontier Region Lakki Marwat were not a part of Bannu Division, but were a part of the Federally Administered Tribal Areas outside Khyber Pakhtunkhwa.

B. There were only three constituencies solely inside Bannu Division at the time of the 2018 Pakistani general election, but there was a fourth constituency, NA-51, that was made of regions from different divisions. NA-51 covered the Frontier Region Bannu and the Frontier Region Lakki Marwat in Bannu Division, but together those areas only make up 19.42% of the population of the constituency and 2.61% of the population of the division, so it is omitted in the infobox. That seat was won by Muttahida Majlis-e-Amal.

C. At the time of the 2018 Pakistani general election, Bannu District sent four representatives to the KPK Assembly and Lakki Marwat District sent three, but elections were held a year later (in 2019) in the areas of Khyber Pakhtunkhwa that were formerly part of the Federally Administered Tribal Areas. At the time of the 2019 elections, North Waziristan elected two representatives, which add up to nine for the entire division. Once again, though, there was another constituency, PK-115, that was made of regions from different divisions. PK-115 (just like NA-51) covered the Frontier Region Bannu and the Frontier Region Lakki Marwat in Bannu Division, but together those areas only make up 19.42% of the population of the constituency and 2.61% of the population of the division, so it is omitted in the infobox. That seat was won by Jamiat Ulema-e-Islam (F).
