= Marmandi Azim =

Nar Muhammad Khan Ghaznikhel
- Union council and town
- Ghazni khel
- Country: Pakistan
- Province: Khyber Pakhtunkhwa
- District: Lakki Marwat District
- Time zone: UTC+5 (PST)

Marmandi Azim is a town and union council of Lakki Marwat District in Khyber Pakhtunkhwa province of Pakistan. Azimkhan is the son of Arsalakhan Ghaznikhel.

Arsalakhan is the son of Daawraan Khan Dawrankhel.

Dawrankhan or kamalkhan kemalkhel is brother

In Right Side Village Nar Muhammad Khan Ghazni Khel
