= Samandi =

Coordinates: 32°45′15″N 71°4′28″E

- Union council and town
- Interactive map of Samandi
- Country: Pakistan
- Province: Khyber Pakhtunkhwa
- District: Lakki Marwat District
- Time zone: UTC+5 (PST)

Samandi is a town and union council of Lakki Marwat District in Khyber Pakhtunkhwa province of Pakistan. It is located at 32°45'15N 71°4'28E and has an altitude of 401 metres (1318 feet).
