= Shahab Khel =

Coordinates: 32°43′58″N 71°1′4″E

- Union council and town
- Interactive map of Shahab Khel
- Country: Pakistan
- Province: Khyber Pakhtunkhwa
- District: Lakki Marwat District
- Time zone: UTC+5 (PST)

Shahab Khel is a town and union council of Lakki Marwat District in Khyber Pakhtunkhwa province of Pakistan. It is located at 32°43'58N 71°1'4E and has an altitude of 328 metres (1079 feet).
