= Abdul Shakoor =

Pakistani politician (1968–2023)

Mufti Abdul Shakoor HI
- عبد الشکور

Minister for Religious Affairs and Inter-faith Harmony
- In office 19 April 2022 – 15 April 2023
- President: Arif Alvi
- Prime Minister: Shehbaz Sharif
- Preceded by: Noor-ul-Haq Qadri
- Succeeded by: Muhammad Talha Mahmood

Member of the National Assembly of Pakistan
- In office 13 August 2018 – 15 April 2023
- Preceded by: Qaiser Jamal
- Constituency: NA-51 (Tribal Area-XII)

Personal details
- Born: 1 January 1968 Lakki Marwat, Khyber Pakhtunkhwa, Pakistan
- Died: 15 April 2023 (aged 55) Islamabad, Pakistan
- Party: Jamiat Ulema-e-Islam (F)
- Other political affiliations: MMA
- Awards: Hilal-i-Imtiaz (2023; posthumously)

Abdul Shakoor (1 January 1968 – 15 April 2023) was a Pakistani Islamic scholar and politician, who served as the Minister for Religious Affairs and Interfaith Harmony from 2022 to 2023 and was also a member of the National Assembly of Pakistan from 2018 to 2023.

Abdul Shakoor died in a Traffic collision in the Red Zone of Islamabad on 15 April 2023.

== Early life ==
Abdul Shakoor was born on 1 January 1968, in a village of Lakki Marwat in Khyber Pakhtunkhwa.

Beginning his religious education at the Madrasah Dara Pizo, he later earned his Master's in Philosophy from Shah Waliullah University in Hyderabad in 1991 and his Master's in Islamic Studies from Darul Uloom Haqqania in 1993.

In 2002, he became a khatib or orator at a Jama Masjid located in Peshawar.

He was married twice, with two daughters from his first wife and a son from the second.

He was a teacher of different subjects such as philosophy, logic, jurisprudence, hadith, commentary, and fatwa at Peshawar's Darul Uloom for 20 years.

== Political career ==
Abdul Shakoor was elected as the President of Jamiat Talba-e-Islam (JTI), the Student wing of Jamiat Ulema-e-Islam (F) from Bannu and Lakki Marwat while in the fourth grade and later became JUI-F's ‘Ameer’ for tribal areas and special advisor to Fazal-ur-Rehman.

He was elected to the National Assembly of Pakistan as a candidate of Muttahida Majlis-e-Amal (MMA) from constituency NA-51 (Tribal Area-XII) in the 2018 Pakistani general election. He received 21,896 votes and defeated Qaiser Jamal.

== Death ==
Abdul Shakoor died in a Traffic collision in Islamabad on 15 April 2023.

According to Islamabad police, Abdul Shakoor was driving when another vehicle smashed into the driver's side of his vehicle.

He was rushed to Polyclinic Hospital where he died due to severe internal bleeding. The five people in the other vehicle were arrested.

== Awards and honours ==
- Hilal-i-Imtiaz (2023; posthumously)

== See also ==
- List of Deobandis
- List of members of the 15th National Assembly of Pakistan
