= Bakhmal Ahmed Zai =

Coordinates: 32°39′39″N 70°37′56″E

- Union council and town
- Interactive map of Bakhmal Ahmed Zai
- Country: Pakistan
- Province: Khyber Pakhtunkhwa
- District: Lakki Marwat District
- Time zone: UTC+5 (PST)

Bakhmal Amad Zai is a town and union council of Lakki Marwat District in Khyber Pakhtunkhwa province of Pakistan. It is located at 32°39'39N 70°37'56E and has an altitude of 301 metres (990 feet).
