= Tajori =

Coordinates: 32°37′34″N 70°34′55″E

- Union council and town
- Interactive map of Tajori
- Country: Pakistan
- Province: Khyber Pakhtunkhwa
- District: Lakki Marwat District
- Time zone: UTC+5 (PST)

Tajori is a town and union council of Lakki Marwat District in Khyber Pakhtunkhwa province of Pakistan. It is located at 32°37'34N 70°34'55E and has an altitude of 319 metres (1049 feet).
