= Ghandi Khan Khel =

Gandi Khan Khel It is called Khan khel cause of living of Brave People which is called Khan khel. Khan khel is prominent in Gandi khan khel. It is also famous for Ashab-e-Keram (r.a)
- Union council and town
- Gandi Khan Khel
- Country: Pakistan
- Province: Khyber Pakhtunkhwa
- District: Lakki Marwat District
- Time zone: UTC+5 (PST)

Gandi Khan Khel is a town and union council of Lakki Marwat District in Khyber Pakhtunkhwa province of Pakistan. It is situated between Gambila and Serai Naurang, a tehsil of Lakki Marwat District. It has their own Chowk named as Gandi Chowk. Which is the famous bus stop in Pakistan.

It has two union councils e.i. Gandi 1 & Gandi 2. Union Council Gandi 1 contains some of famous Kotka/Kalays e.i. Painda Khel, Amin Jabu Khel, Kotka Shadi Khan, Ayaz Wala, khali khel, Kotka Nar Jaffar, Amand Khan kala, Dray Plary, Shah Muhammad Kala, Kotka Shaslem, Lali Kala, and Gidharh Kala.

Gandi 2 is a Union Council which is famous for the respectable people on the district Level. Here is the list of some villages i.e. Khan Khel, (it has their own Chowk named as Khan Khel Chowk), Mohallah Saheban (Zakori sharif), Gandi Adda, Madi Khel, Gabarhi and Sikh Kala, and Kotka Sardar Khan. It has two Govt. high schools One is for boys and the other one is for girls. Islamabadian ( GM Gandi Khan Khel).
