= Pahar Khel Thal =

Coordinates: 32°38′51″N 70°52′34″E

- Union council and town
- Interactive map of Pahar Khel Thal
- Country: Pakistan
- Province: Khyber Pakhtunkhwa
- District: Lakki Marwat District
- Time zone: UTC+5 (PST)

Pahar Khel Thal is a town and union council of Lakki Marwat District in Khyber Pakhtunkhwa province of Pakistan. It is located at 32°38'51N 70°52'34E and has an altitude of 254 metres (836 feet). pahar khel thal have different muhalla like Muhammad Yar khel, Azam khel, patol khel, Yar Ahmad khel, awan, etc. Pahar khel thal is among advanced and educational leading villages of district lakki marwat with good public facilities and resources.
