= Ghazni Khel =

Coordinates: 32°33′30″N 70°44′22″E

- Union Council
- Interactive map of Ghazni Khel
- Country: Pakistan
- Province: Khyber Pakhtunkhwa
- District: Lakki Marwat District
- Tehsil: Ghazni Khel Tehsil

Government
  - Chairman: Zeeshan Muhammad Khan (IND)
- Time zone: UTC+5 (PST)
- Area code: 0969

Ghazni Khel is a town and union council of Lakki Marwat District in the Khyber Pakhtunkhwa province of Pakistan. Ghazni Khel have two famous football Club. One is Muslim CLUB and 2nd is Khan Club.It is located at 32°33'30N 70°44'22E and has an altitude of 287 metres (944 feet). It is located 20km from its district headquarters Lakki Muhammad Ghazni khel
