= Darra Tang =

Coordinates: 32°36′0″N 71°10′0″E

- Union council and town
- Interactive map of Darra Tang
- Country: Pakistan
- Province: Khyber Pakhtunkhwa
- District: Lakki Marwat District
- Time zone: UTC+5 (PST)

Darra Tang is a town and union council of Lakki Marwat District in Khyber Pakhtunkhwa province of Pakistan. It is located at 32°36'0N 71°10'0E and has an altitude of 220 metres (725 feet).
