= Shakh Quli Khel =

Shakh Qulli Khan
- Union council and town
- Country: Pakistan
- Province: Khyber Pakhtunkhwa
- District: Lakki Marwat District

Government
- Time zone: UTC+5 (PST)

Shakh Quli Khel is a Village and union council of Lakki Marwat District in Khyber Pakhtunkhwa province of Pakistan.
