= Mash Masti Khani =

Coordinates: 32.8241°N 70.9646°E

- Union council and town
- Interactive map of Mash Masti Khani
- Country: Pakistan
- Province: Khyber Pakhtunkhwa
- District: Lakki Marwat District
- Time zone: UTC+5 (PST)

Mash Masti Khani is a town and union council of Lakki Marwat District in Khyber Pakhtunkhwa province of Pakistan.
