= Behram Khel =

- Union council and town
- Interactive map of Behram Khel
- Country: Pakistan
- Province: Khyber Pakhtunkhwa
- Time zone: UTC+5 (PST)

Behram Khel is a town and union council of Lakki Marwat District in Khyber Pakhtunkhwa province of Pakistan. It is located at 32°34′16″N 70°34′27″E and has an altitude of 341 metres (1122 feet).
