= Zafar Beg Bhittani =

Pakistani politician

Zafar Baig Bhittani

Member of the National Assembly of Pakistan
- In office 2008–2013
- Constituency: NA-47 (Tribal Area-XII)

Zafar Beg Bhittani is a Pakistani politician who had been a member of the National Assembly of Pakistan from 2008 to 2013.

== Political career ==
He was elected to the National Assembly of Pakistan from Constituency NA-47 (Tribal Area-XII) as an independent candidate in the 2008 Pakistani general election. He received 21,426 votes and defeated an independent candidate, Nasim Afridi.

He ran for the seat of the National Assembly from Constituency NA-47 (Tribal Area-XII) as an independent candidate in the 2013 Pakistani general election but was unsuccessful. He received 28 votes and lost the seat to Qaiser Jamal.
