= Sherikhel =

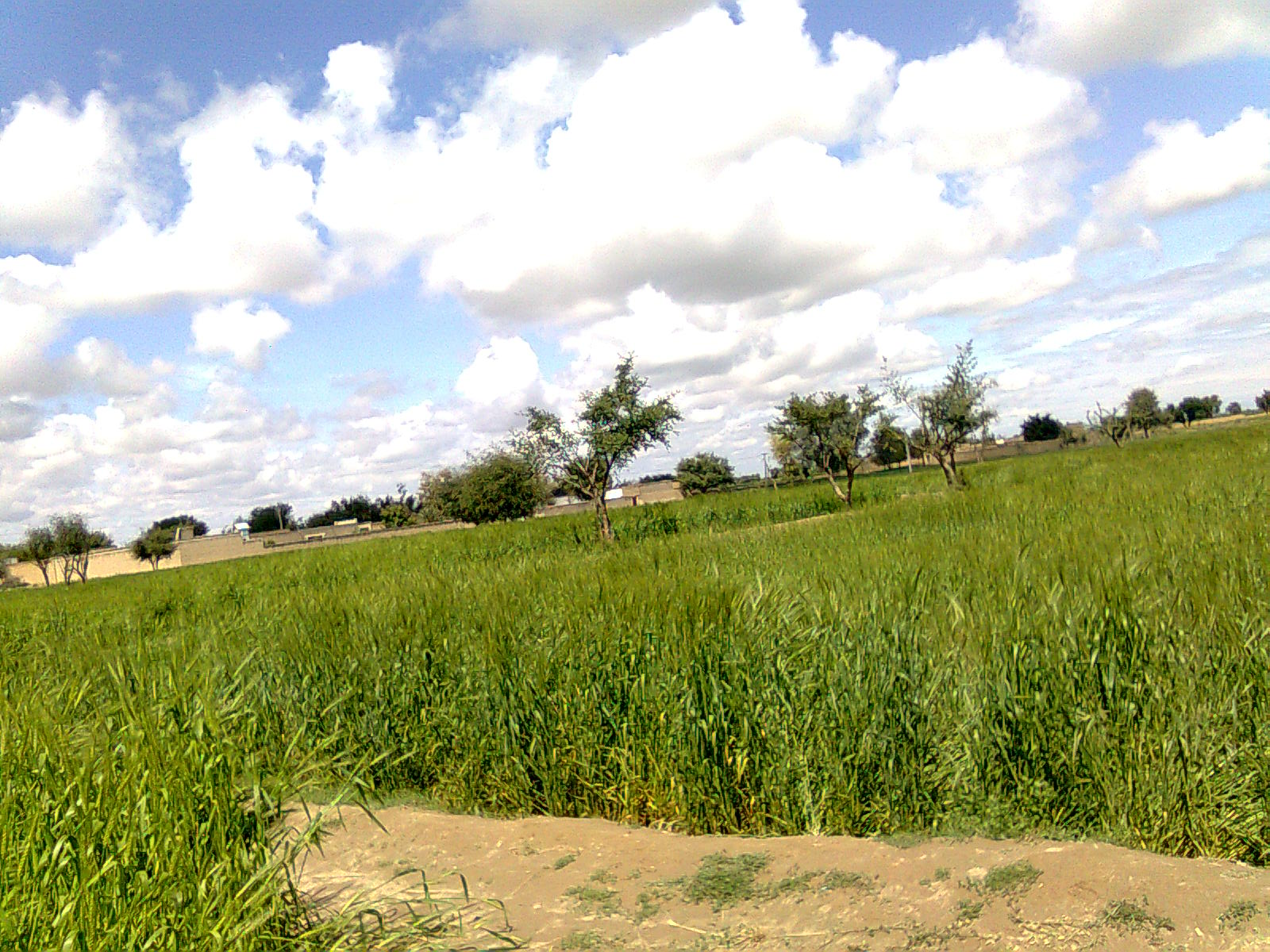
Sherikhel North side (Lajmirkhel)

Sherikhel is a village in Lakki Marwat District in Pakistan. It has about 250 houses and six mosques.

Sherikhel has four neighborhoods:

- Lajmirkhel
- Mangokhel
- Diwanikhel
- Zainokhel

Lajmirkhel contains the North Forest. The west side is also forested and contains a lake near Mangokhel and Lajmirkhel. Sherikhel's south hills have natural gas deposits.
