= Kot Kashmir =

Coordinates: 32°44′27″N 70°42′50″E

- Union council and town
- Interactive map of Kot Kashmir
- Country: Pakistan
- Province: Khyber Pakhtunkhwa
- District: Lakki Marwat District
- Time zone: UTC+5 (PST)

Kot Kashmir is a town and union council of Lakki Marwat District in Khyber Pakhtunkhwa province of Pakistan. It is located at 32°44'27N 70°42'50E and has an altitude of 284 metres (935 feet). Kot Kashmir has many small hamlets known as Kali or kotki. The well-known hamlets include Jangi Khan Kalai, Chandu Khel, Lali Kala, Machan Khel among others hindal khel kotkai.

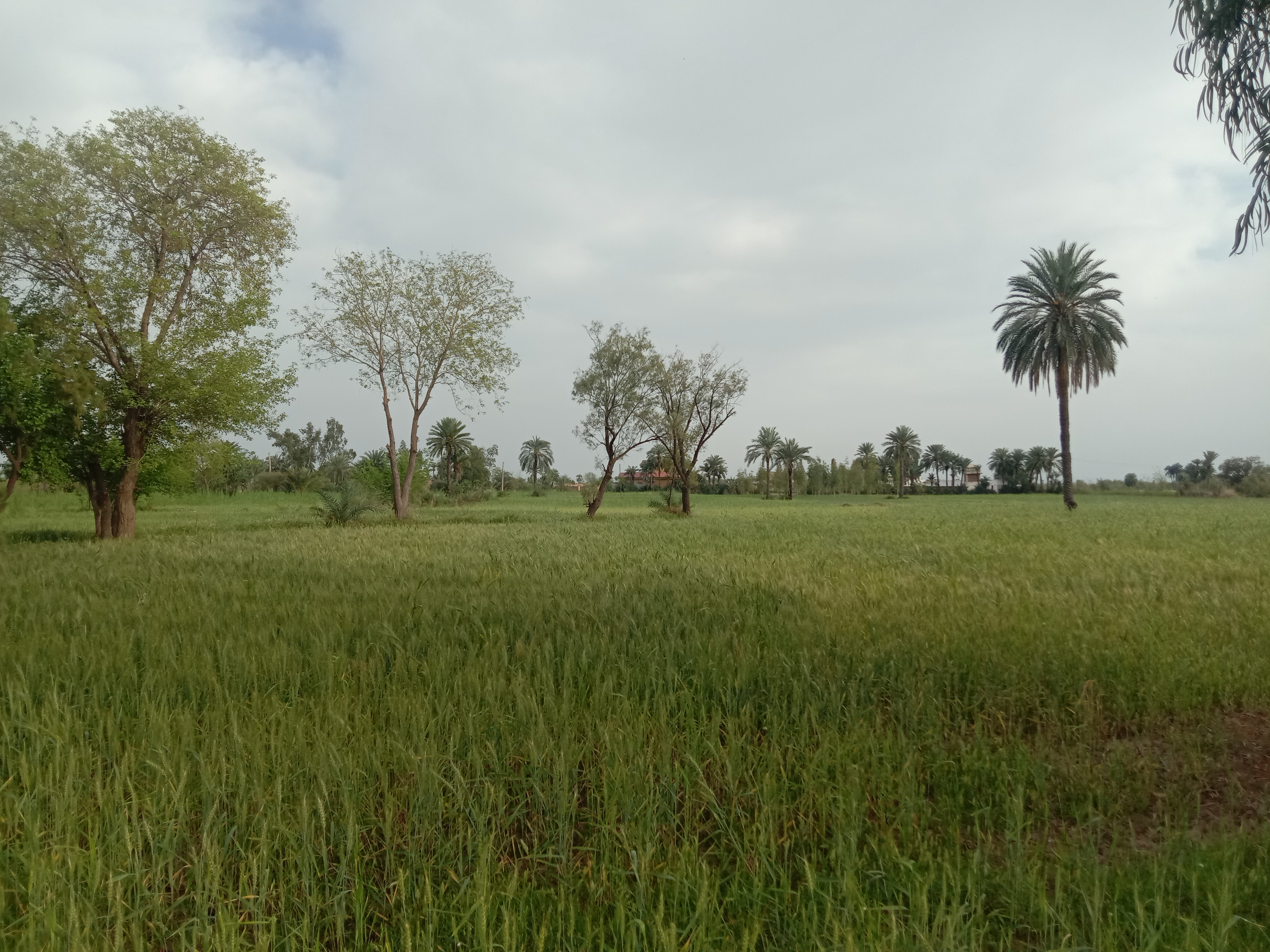
Wheat fields in Kot Kashmir village

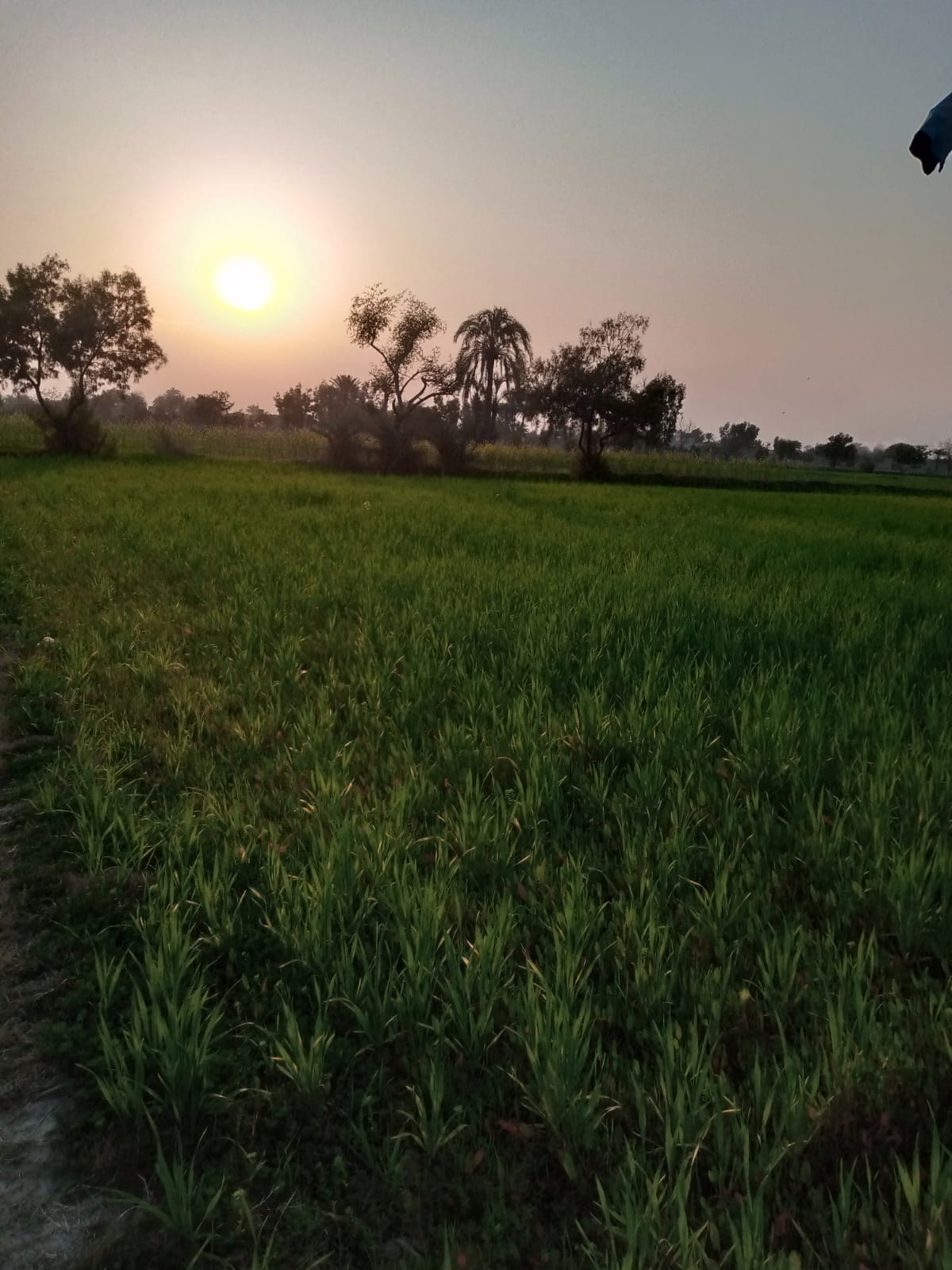
Sun set in Kot Kashmir

Tochi River, also known as Gambila river or Darya-e-Gambila(دریائے گمبیلا) or simply Gambila(گمبیلا) as it is known in Kot Kashmir originates in Khost province of Afghanistan and enters Pakistan which passes through, and is a source of irrigation in Waziristan, Bannu and Lakki Marwat. The river passes through Kot Kashmir.Kotka Jangi Khan and Kotkai of Kot Kashmir town lie on the bank of Gambila river.

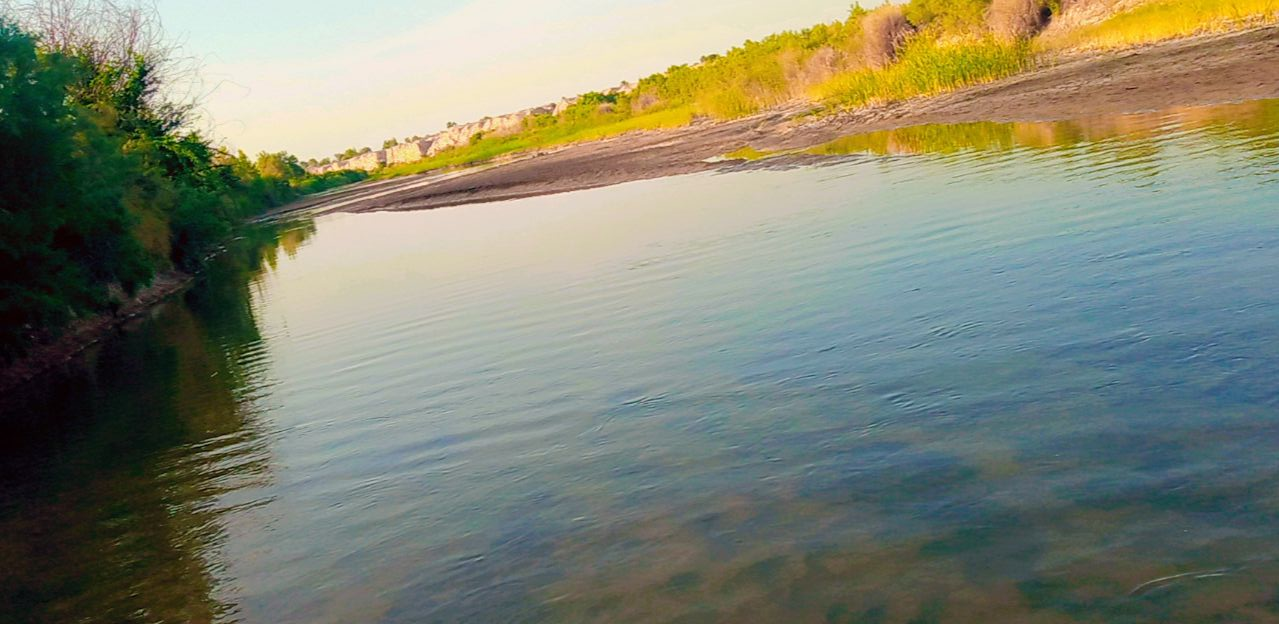
River Gambila, Kot Kashmir

Culture of the people

The people of the town are known as Marwat. Marwat people have their own culture. Their culture makes them beautiful. The dress code of Marwat people is simple like other pashtoon people. They wear Shalwar Kamiz. The elders of the Marwat tribes can be known from their unique turbans also known as “Patkai/Paktay” locally. The young and the elder both keep sheet known as Chadar in winter specifically to avoid cold and in summer to avoid sun but is also used as part of the culture in moderate weather. The people of the town are very hospitable, friendly and courageous. The women cover themselves with/in Burqas/Burkas when they go outside home.

Language and Dialect

The language of the people of Kot Kashmir like other parts of Lakki Marwat is Pashto.The dialect of the Marwat Pashto is different from that of Wazirs, Bannuchi, Peshawri people and others. They use Shin(ش) instead of Kha(خ) as used in the standard pashto and Zha/Xhe(ژ) instead of Gaf/Ga(گ).There are other differences as well. For example, Zaa kha Yam(زہ خہ یم) means I am fine in standard dialect and the Marwat dialect of the sentence is Zaa Sha Ya(زہ شہ یہ).
