= Isak Khel =

Coordinates: 32°40′3″N 70°51′47″E

Isak Khel zangi khel& nawar khel
- Union council and town
- Interactive map of Isak Khel
- Country: Pakistan
- Province: Khyber Pakhtunkhwa
- District: Lakki Marwat District

Government
  - Khan: Aslam Khan Marwat
  - Khan: Hidayat Ullah Khan
- Time zone: UTC+5 (PST)

Isak Khel is a town and union council of Lakki Marwat District in Khyber Pakhtunkhwa province of Pakistan. It is located at 32°40'3N 70°51'47E and has an altitude of 250 metres (823 feet).
