= NA-51 (Tribal Area-XII) =

Constituency of the National Assembly of Pakistan

- Former constituency for the National Assembly of Pakistan
- Region: Bannu Subdivision; Peshawar Subdivision; Lakki Marwat Subdivision; Dera Ismail Khan Subdivision; Tank Subdivision; Kohat Subdivision
- Electorate: 166,632

Former constituency
- Abolished: 2022
- Member: Vacant
- Created from: NA-47 (Tribal Area-XII)
- Replaced by: NA-30 Peshawar-III; NA-35 Kohat; NA-39 Bannu; NA-41 Lakki Marwat; NA-42 Tank; NA-45 Dera Ismail Khan-II

NA-51 (Tribal Area-XII) (این اے-۴۷، قباَئلی علاقہ-۱۲) was a constituency for the National Assembly of Pakistan comprising Bannu, Peshawar, Lakki Marwat, Dera Ismail Khan, Tank, and Kohat subdivisions.

== Members of Parliament ==
=== 1997–1999: NA-34 (Tribal Area-XII) ===
Election	Member	Party
1997	Haji Baz Gul Afridi	Independent

=== 2002–2018: NA-47 (Tribal Area-XII) ===
Election	Member	Party
2002	Naseem Afridi	Independent
2008	Zafar Beg Bhittani	Independent
2013	Qaiser Jamal	PTI

=== Since 2018-2023: NA-51 (Tribal Area-XII) ===
Election	Member	Party
2018	Mufti Abdul Shakoor	MMA

== Election 1997 ==
The national assembly elections were held on 03 Feb 1997. Haji Baz Gul Afridi an independent candidate won by a big majority in NA-34 Tribal Area-VIII.

== Election 2002 ==
General elections were held on 10 October 2002. Naseem Afridi, an independent candidate, won by 10,341 votes.

== Election 2008 ==
The result of general election 2008 in this constituency is given below.

=== Result ===
Zafar Beg Bhittani succeeded in the election 2008 and became the member of National Assembly.

General Election 2008: Tribal Area-XII
Party	Candidate	Votes	%
Independent candidate	Zafar Beg Bhittani	21,426	45
Independent candidate	Doctor Nasim Afridi	10,468	23
Independent candidate	Haji Baz Gul Afridi	9,213	20
Others	Others	6,599	12

== Election 2013 ==
General election 2013 were held on May 11, 2013. The election was won by Qaiser Jamal of Pakistan Tehreek-e-Insaf.

General election 2013: NA-47 (Tribal Area-XII)
Party	Candidate	Votes	%	±%
PTI	Qaiser Jamal	11,328	23.53	
JUI (F)	Mufti Abdul Shakoor	10,240	21.27	
Independent	Sher Azam Khan	5,028	10.45	
PML(N)	Baz Gul Afridi	4,310	8.95	
Independent	Abdullah Nangyal	4,131	8.58	
Others	Others (thirty-one candidates)	13,100	27.21	
Turnout		48,137	39.70	
Majority		1,088	2.26	
Registered electors		121,265		
PTI gain from Independent				

== Election 2018 ==
General elections were held on 25 July 2018.

General election 2018: NA-51 (Tribal Area-XIII)
Party	Candidate	Votes	%	±%
MMA	Abdul Shakoor	21,962	31.46	▲8.68^{†}
PTI	Qaiser Jamal	18,754	26.87	▲3.34
Independent	Haji Baz Gul Afridi	14,662	21.00	
Independent	Abdullah Nangyal	5,172	7.41	▼1.17
Others	Others (fifteen candidates)	8,494	12.17	
Turnout		69,803	41.89	▲2.19
Rejected ballots		1,023	1.47	
Majority		3,142	4.52	
Registered electors		166,632		
MMA gain from PTI				

^{†}JUI-F, and JI contested as part of MMA

== See also ==
- NA-50 (Tribal Area-XI)
- NA-52 (Islamabad-I)
