= Sarai Naurang Tehsil =

Sarai Naurang Tehsil سرای نورنګ
- Tehsil
- Country: Pakistan
- Region: Khyber Pakhtunkhwa
- District: Lakki Marwat District

Government
  - Chairman: Aziz Ullah Khan (JI)

Population (2017)
  - Tehsil: 296,908
  - Urban: 29,955
  - Rural: 266,953
- Time zone: UTC+5 (PST)
  - Summer (DST): UTC+6 (PDT)
- Area code: 0969

Sarai Naurang (Pashto: سرای نورنګ; Urdu: سرائے نورنگ) is a tehsil located in the Lakki Marwat District, Khyber Pakhtunkhwa, Pakistan. The population is 296,908 according to the 2017 census. It is a mostly rural area, but it does contain one urban area, the town of Naurang, which has a population of 29,955. Naurang is the second-largest tehsil in Lakki Marwat District and the third-largest in Bannu Division.

== See also ==
- Lakki Marwat
- Bannu
- Lakki Marwat District
- Bannu Division
- Ghoriwala
- List of tehsils of Khyber Pakhtunkhwa
