= Baz Gul Afridi =

Pakistani politician

Malik Haji Baz Gul Afridi
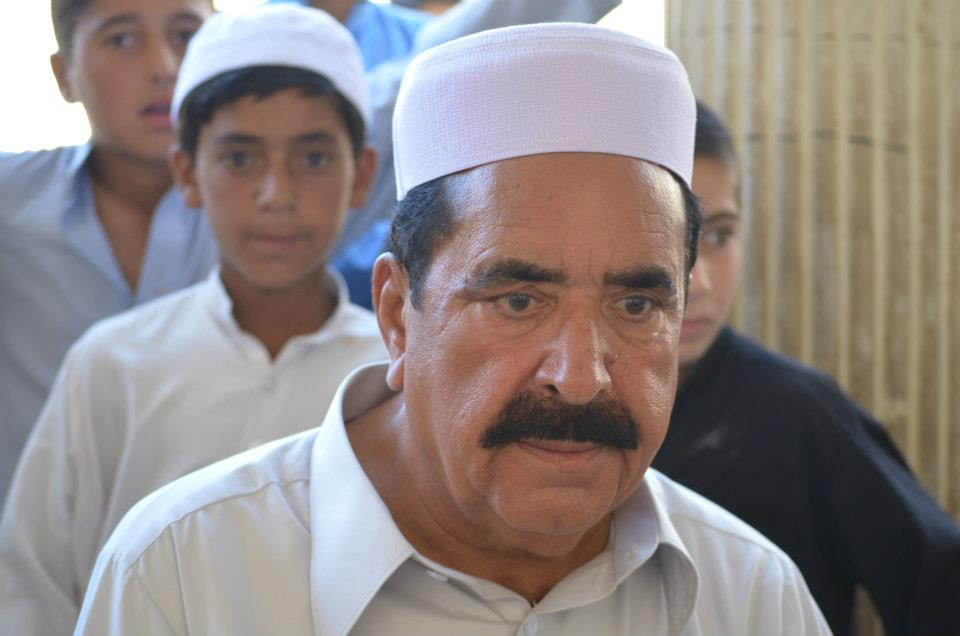

Member of the National Assembly of Pakistan
- In office 15 February 1997 – 12 October 1999
- Preceded by: Malik Muhammad Aslam Khan Afridi
- Succeeded by: Dr. Naseem Gul Afridi
- Constituency: NA-34 (Frontier Regions)

Personal details
- Born: Dara Adam Khel, Zarghun Khel
- Party: Independent Candidate
- Other political affiliations: PMLN
- Relations: Former Senator Haji Gul Afridi ( Brother )
- Occupation: Real Estate Businessman
- Profession: Politician, Businessman, Social Worker
- Nickname: Baz Gul Haji

Haji Baz Gul Afridi (Urdu: حاجی باز گل آفریدی) is a Pakistani politician and businessman from the Darra Adam Khel region of Pakistan. He served as the Member of National Assembly for the FATA region NA-34 from 1997 to 1999.

Haji Baz Gul comes from a Powerful Wealthy Karlani Afridi Pashtun family from the region of Darra Adam Khel in the federally administrated tribal areas of Pakistan. Baz Gul is the brother of former Pakistani Senator Haji Gul Afridi (Gul Haji). He is an entrepreneur by profession and prior to entering politics he was active in the Real Estate business throughout Pakistan. He also co-owned Peshawar's largest computer market Gul Haji Plaza.

Malik Haji Baz Gul Afridi was a prominent tribal elder from Dara Adam Khel, located in the former Federally Administered Tribal Areas (FATA). He was widely known for his strong leadership, political influence, and deep connection with his people.

Malik Haji Baz Gul Afridi played a significant role in maintaining order and unity in the region during challenging times. In an area where tribal traditions and local authority carried great importance, he used the power of politics wisely to strengthen stability. Through participation in jirgas (tribal councils) and close coordination with both tribal elders and government representatives, he ensured that the voice of his people was heard and respected.

What distinguished him most was not only his political strength but also his respectful and compassionate approach toward the community. He believed that true leadership comes from serving people with dignity, fairness, and love. He treated members of his tribe with equality, listened to their concerns, and worked to resolve disputes peacefully. His hospitality, generosity, and open-door policy earned him loyalty and admiration across the region.

By combining political strategy with respect for tribal values, Malik Haji Baz Gul Afridi was able to guide Dara Adam Khel with firmness and wisdom. His leadership reflected a balance of authority and kindness, making him a respected figure in the history of the area. he also promoted education, welfare and sports leading change in the FATA region.

== Political career ==
Baz Gul entered politics by running as an independent candidate for the National Assembly of Pakistan during the Pakistan General Elections 1997 and was elected as MNA from NA-34 region of FATA. He served as the MNA for NA-34 FATA until 1999.

Baz Gul was a candidate for National Assembly seat NA-47 in the 2008 General Election. He was third, with 20% of the vote. He contested the same seat in the 2013 General Election, this time as a candidate for the PML-N and was unsuccessful in his campaign.

Baz Gul Afridi announced his resignation from PML-N after parliament passed the FATA merger bill stating that he values the tribal tradition of self determination more than alliance with any party. He is to stand as an independent candidate for NA-51 for the 2018 Pakistan general election.

== See also ==
- Afridi Tribe
- Political
- Businessman
- FATA Region
