= Bazar Ahmed Khan =

Coordinates: 32°59′6″N 70°38′32″E

Bazar Ahmed Khan Kam Bazar
- Town and union council
- Interactive map of Bazar Ahmed Khan
- Country: Pakistan
- Region: Khyber Pakhtunkhwa
- District: Bannu District
- Time zone: UTC+5 (PST)

Bazar Ahmed Khan is a town and union council of Bannu District in Khyber Pakhtunkhwa province of Pakistan. It is located at 32°59'6N 70°38'32E and has an altitude of 344 metres (1131 feet).
