= Ghazni Khel Tehsil =

Pakistani administrative area

Ghazni Khel
- Tehsil
- Interactive map of Ghazni Khel
- Coordinates: 32°33′30″N 70°44′22″E
- Country: Pakistan
- Province: Khyber Pakhtunkhwa
- District: Lakki Marwat District
- Seat: Ghazni Khel

Government
  - Chairman: Zeeshan Muhammad Khan (IND)

Area
  - Total: 1,153 km^{2} (445 sq mi)
- Time zone: UTC+5 (PST)
- Area code: 0969

Ghazni Khel Tehsil is an administrative subdivision (tehsil) of Lakki Marwat District in the Khyber Pakhtunkhwa province of Pakistan. The tehsil covers an area of 1,153km2 and according to the 2023 census has a total population of 329,775 - of which 165,804 are male and 163,968 are female (the total population in 2017 was 295,984). The number of households in the tehsil is 43,615 of which 42,154 are owned and 809 are rented. The tehsil forms part of the PK-106 Lakki Marwat-ll electoral constituency.

== Demography ==
According to the 2023 census, the mother-tongue of residents are as follow: 96 Urdu, 311 Punjabi, 36 Sindhi, 326,571 Pushto, 285 Balochi, 1 Kashmiri, 261 Saraiki, 1 Hindko, 5 Kalasha and 17 others.

Mother tongues of residents
Language	Number of speakers	Percentage
Pushto	326,571	99.69%
Punjabi	311	0.09%
Balochi	285	0.09%
Saraiki	261	0.08%
Urdu	96	0.03%
Sindhi	36	0.01%
Others	17	0.01%
Kalasha	5	<0.01%
Kashmiri	1	<0.01%
Hindko	1	<0.01%

According to the 2023 census, the religious affiliation of residents are as follows: 327099 Muslims, 472 Christians, 4 Ahmadis, and 3 Sikhs.

Religious affiliation of residents
Religion	Number of adherents	Percentage
Muslims	327,099	99.85%
Christians	472	0.14%
Ahmadis	4	0.00%
Sikhs	3	0.00%
