= Bettani Tehsil =

Coordinates: 32.47°N 70.19°E

Bettani Tehsil تحصیل بیٹنی بېټني تحصیل Frontier Region Lakki Marwat سرحدی علاقہ لکی مروت لکي مروت سرحدي سیمه
- Tehsil
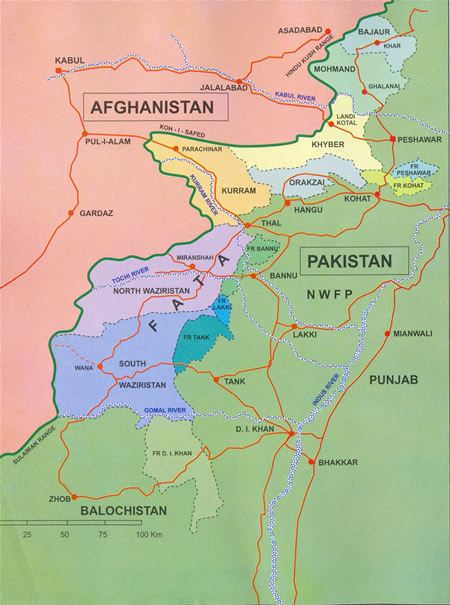
- Location of the former Frontier Regions in the former Federally Administered Tribal Areas
- Country: Pakistan
- Region: Khyber Pakhtunkhwa
- District: Lakki Marwat District
- Seat: Gabar Bagh

Population (2023)
  - Total: 60,000

Bettani Tehsil is an administrative subdivision (tehsil) of Lakki Marwat District in Khyber Pakhtunkhwa province of Pakistan. This subdivision shares its boundary on the north with Bannu Subdivision, on the west with Jandola Tehsil (Formerly Tank Frontier Region), to the west with North and South Waziristan and to the northeast with the district of Lakki Marwat. Its total area is 132 square kilometers.

Prior to 2018, this administrative subdivision was known as Lakki Marwat Subdivision, and formerly also known as Frontier Region Lakki Marwat. The region was named after Lakki Marwat District which lied to the northeast. With the dissolution of the Federally Administered Tribal Areas and its incorporation into Khyber Pakhtunkhwa, Frontier Region Lakki Marwat was reorganizd as Bettani Tehsil within Lakki Marwat District.

The main settlement of Bettani Tehsil is the locality of Gabar Bagh.

== Land Use ==
The total cultivated area is about 33,000 acres.

== Demographics ==
The 1998 census counted a population of 6,990, 98.5% of which have Pashto as a first language and 1.1% – Punjabi.

== Education ==
According to the Alif Ailaan Pakistan District Education Rankings 2015, FR Lakki Marwat is ranked 132 out of 148 districts in terms of education. For facilities and infrastructure, the district is ranked 79 out of 148.
