= Qaiser Jamal =

Pakistani politician

- قیصر جمال

Member of the National Assembly of Pakistan
- In office 1 June 2013 – 31 May 2018
- Constituency: NA-47 (Frontier Regions)

Personal details
- Born: 16 January 1982 (age 44)
- Party: PTI (2013-present)

Qaiser Jamal (Urdu: قیصر جمال; born 16 January 1982) is a Pakistani politician who was a member of the National Assembly of Pakistan from June 2013 to May 2018.

== Early life ==
He was born on 16 January 1982.

== Political career ==
He was elected to the National Assembly of Pakistan as a candidate of Pakistan Tehreek-e-Insaf from Constituency NA-47 (Tribal Area-XII) in the 2013 Pakistani general election. He received 11,328 votes and defeated Mufti Abdul Shakoor, a candidate of Jamiat Ulema-e-Islam (F).

In 2014, an election tribunal de-seated Jamal and ordered re-election in the constituency. The Supreme Court of Pakistan later reinstated the National Assembly membership of Jamal.
