= Lakki Marwat District =

District in Pakistan

Coordinates: 32.605278°N 70.914444°E

Lakki Marwat ضلع لکی مروت لکي مروت ولسوالۍ
- District
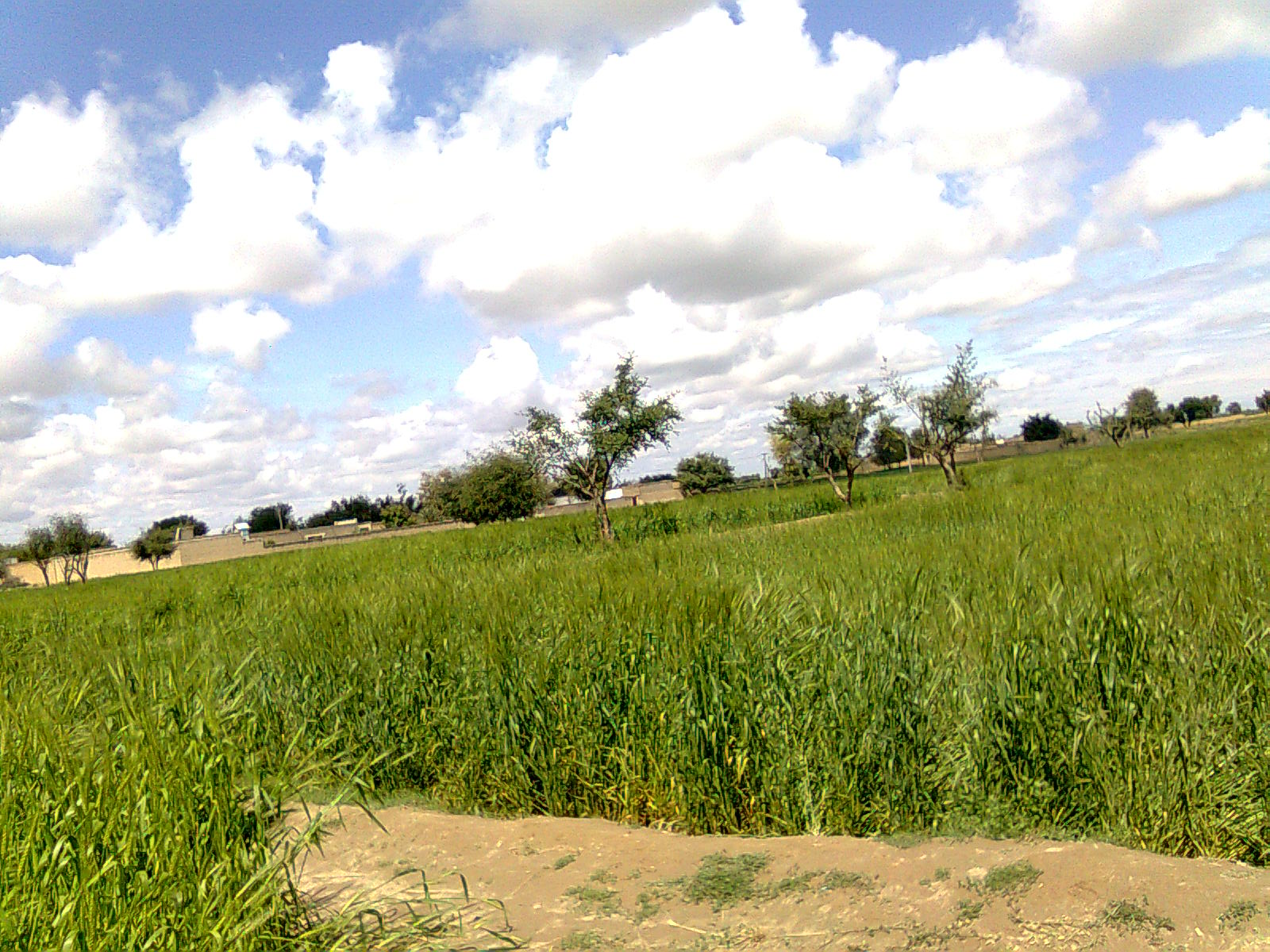
- Fields in Sherikhel village

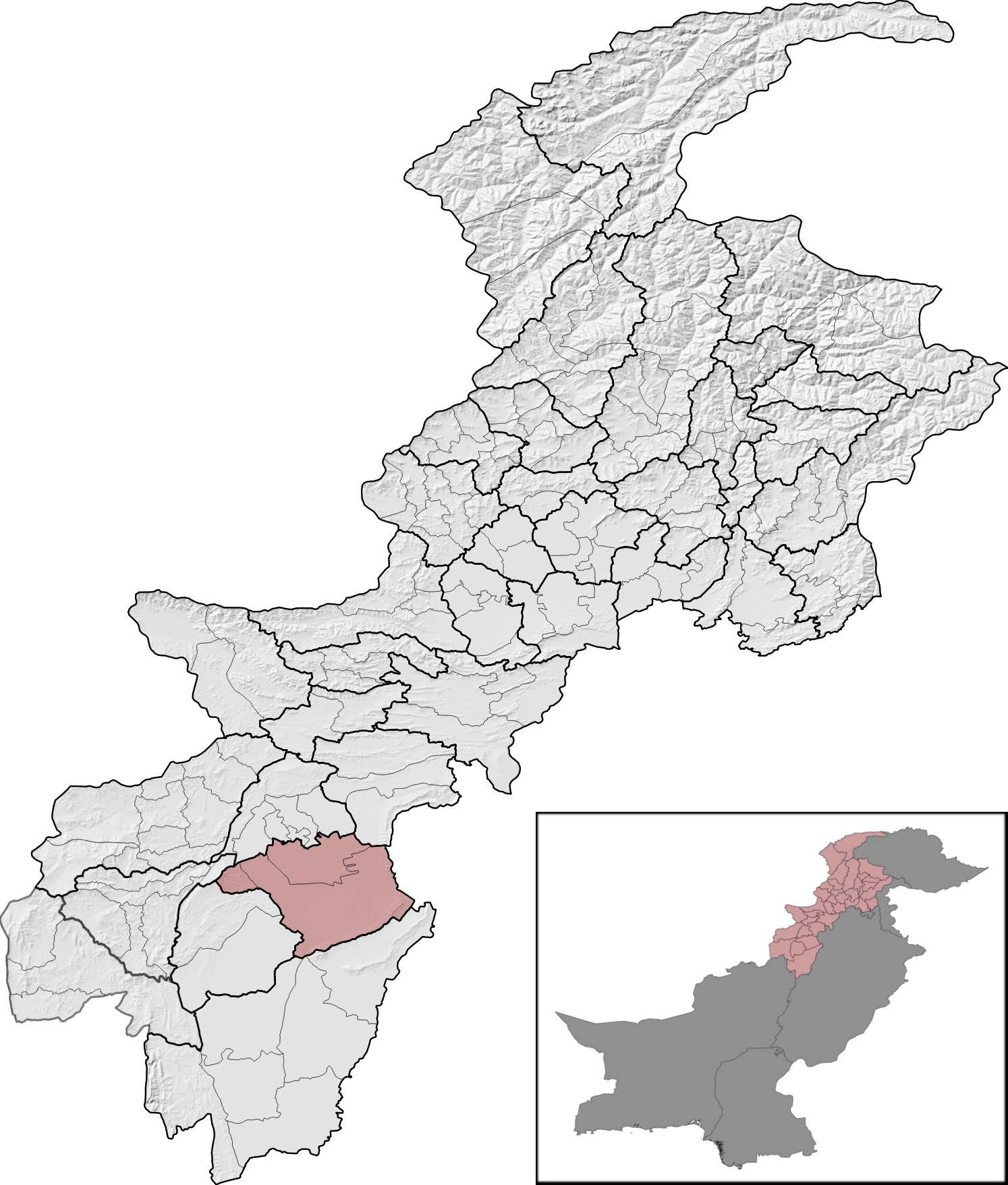
- Lakki Marwat District (red) in Khyber Pakhtunkhwa
- Country: Pakistan
- Province: Khyber Pakhtunkhwa
- Division: Bannu
- Established: 1 July 1992
- Headquarters: Lakki Marwat

Government
  - Type: District Administration
  - Deputy Commissioner: Iqbal Hussain
  - District Police Officer: N/A
  - District Health Officer: N/A

Area
  - Total: 3,296 km^{2} (1,273 sq mi)

Population (2023)
  - Total: 1,040,856
  - Density: 315.8/km^{2} (817.9/sq mi)
  - Urban: 103,045 (9.90%)
  - Rural: 927,403 (90.10%)

Demographics
  - Main language(s): Pashto • Urdu
  - HDI: 0.577

Literacy
  - Literacy rate: Total: 48.47%; Male: 67.36%; Female: 28.95%
- Time zone: UTC+5 (PST)
- Postal code: 28420
- Number of Tehsils: 3
- Website: lakkimarwat.kp.gov.pk

Lakki Marwat (Pashto: لکي مروت ولسوالۍ, Urdu: ضلع لکی مروت) is a district in the Bannu Division of the Khyber Pakhtunkhwa province of Pakistan. It was created as an administrative district on 1 July 1992, prior to which it was a tehsil of Bannu District.

== Geography ==
The district is located in a southern part of Khyber Paktunkhwa. It borders Karak and Bannu districts to the north, Tank district to the west, Dera Ismail Khan district to the south, and Mianwali district of Punjab to the east.

The district is a combination of mountains and sandy plains. The mountainous areas are along the boundaries of the district especially in the east, southeast, southwest and northwest. In the southeast, the Marwat range separates Lakki Marwat from the Dera Ismail Khan district while in the east the Karak Niazi range separates it from the Mianwali District. It is surrounded by Baittani range on the west and southwest, which separates it from Tank District and South Waziristan districts.The general elevation of these hills ranges from 500 to 1000 meters above the sea level. The Kurram river flows through the district from northwest to the southeast and joins the Indus River south of Isakhel town. One of its important tributary is Gambila river, also known as the Tochi. The major part of this basin is an alluvial plain. A northern portion of this plain is situated chiefly in the Kurram Gambila Doab and irrigated by the Kurram river. It is a flat sandy area. The southern part is made up of undulating dunes of sand, furrowed at regular intervals by deep torrent beds which carry the drainage of the Marwat and Baittani ranges to the Gambila. It is good for cultivation, water table is quite deep below the soil surface. In the western portion of the district, the soil is fairly stiff clay covered by a layer of stones at the foot of the hills. The whole district is intersected by numerous hill torrents and deep ravines. The general elevation of the plain area is about 200 to 300 meters above sea level.

== Administration ==
Lakki Marwat district is subdivided into four Tehsils:

Tehsil	Area (km^{2})	Pop. (2023)	Density (ppl/km^{2}) (2023)	Literacy rate (2023)	Union Councils
Bettani Tehsil	132	35,571	269.48	31.62%	
Ghazni Khel Tehsil	1,153	329,775	286.01	54.29%	
Lakki Marwat Tehsil	1,388	341,693	246.18	50.06%	
Sari Naurang Tehsil	623	333,817	535.82	42.66%	

The district has three municipal committees. There are 157 mauzas (the smallest revenue unit).

=== Provincial Assembly ===
Member of Provincial Assembly	Party Affiliation	Constituency	Year
Munawar Khan	Muttahida Majlis-e-Amal	Lakki Marwat-I	2018
Hisham Inamullah Khan	Pakistan Tehreek-e-Insaf	Lakki Marwat-II	2018
Anwar Hayat Khan	Muttahida Majlis-e-Amal	Lakki Marwat-III	2018

== Demographics ==
=== Population ===
Historical population
Year	Pop.	±% p.a.
1951	117,612	—
1961	153,126	+2.67%
1972	225,529	+3.58%
1981	288,759	+2.78%
1998	490,025	+3.16%
2017	902,541	+3.27%
2023	1,040,856	+2.40%

As of the 2023 census, Lakki Marwat district has 131,800 households and a population of 1,040,856. The district has a sex ratio of 102.61 males to 100 females and a literacy rate of 48.47%: 67.36% for males and 28.95% for females. 344,296 (33.22% of the surveyed population) are under 10 years of age. 103,089 (9.90%) live in urban areas. Pashto was the predominant language, spoken by 99.66% of the population.

=== Religion ===
Religion in contemporary Lakki Marwat District
Religious group	1941		2017		2023	
Religious group	Pop.	%	Pop.	%	Pop.	%
Islam	100,551	92.82%	901,932	99.98%	1,034,204	99.80%
Hinduism	6,954	6.42%	16	~0%	24	~0%
Sikhism	827	0.76%	—N/a	—N/a	12	~0%
Christianity	0	0.00%	43	~0%	2,040	0.20%
Others	0	0.00%	147	0.02%	20	~0%
Total Population	108,332	100%	902,138	100%	1,036,300 (Note: Different from official population figure since it excludes sensitive areas where religion was not asked)	100%
Note: 1941 census data is for Lakki Marwat tehsil of erstwhile Bannu district, which roughly corresponds to contemporary Lakki Marwat district excluding the former Frontier Region Lakki Marwat. District and tehsil borders have changed since 1941.

== Climate ==
The region has all the characteristics of a desert due to its sand dunes, scorching heat and dry weather. Summers are hot, while winters are moderately cool. The summer season begins from early May and continues till late September. June and July are the hottest months with a maximum temperature range of 42 to 45 degree Celsius and a minimum temperature range of about 29 to 35 degree Celsius. Periodic sand storms rage through the area during May and June due to the prevalent low humidity. The hot wind, locally known as Lu blows across the district in these months. The cool wave starts in October. Late November, December, January and February and early March are the winter months. Though the daytime temperature in winter is not that low, however there is always a sharp decrease in nights. The mean maximum and minimum temperatures during this period are 20 and 4 degree Celsius respectively. Rainfall is rare and sporadic and generally rains occur in July and August.

== Transport ==
Lakki Marwat was connected with Mari Indus through a narrow gauge railway line during the Raj. The city, a tehsil of Bannu then, was a railway junction. One line went to Bannu, its district, and the other to Tank. The extent of railways network has ever since defined the limits of the settled area bordering the tribal area to its west. The railway track has since been uprooted and the area now is connected through a network of roads. A detailed account of the rise and fall of this particular railway junction was published in the Daily Dawn .

== Notable people ==
- Abdul Shakoor, former Minister of Religious Affairs
- Sant Singh Maskeen, influential Sikh scholar and theologian

== Neighboring areas ==
- Mianwali District
- Tank District
- Waziristan
- Karak
- Dera Ismail Khan
- Bannu

== See also ==
- Marwat
- Districts of Pakistan
