= Insurgency in Khyber Pakhtunkhwa =

Armed conflict involving Pakistan and armed militant groups

- Part of the war on terror and the spillover of the war in Afghanistan (2001–2021)
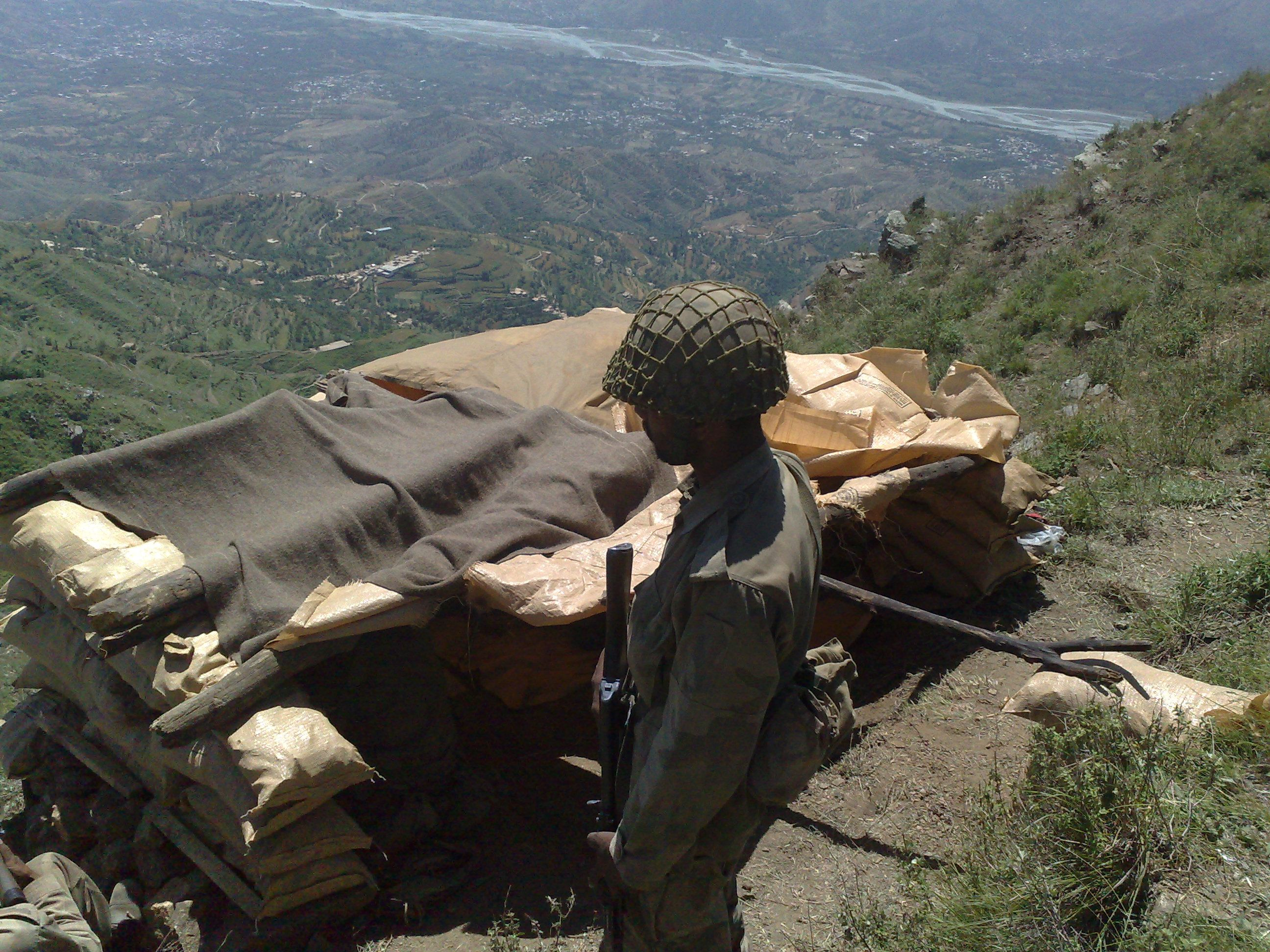
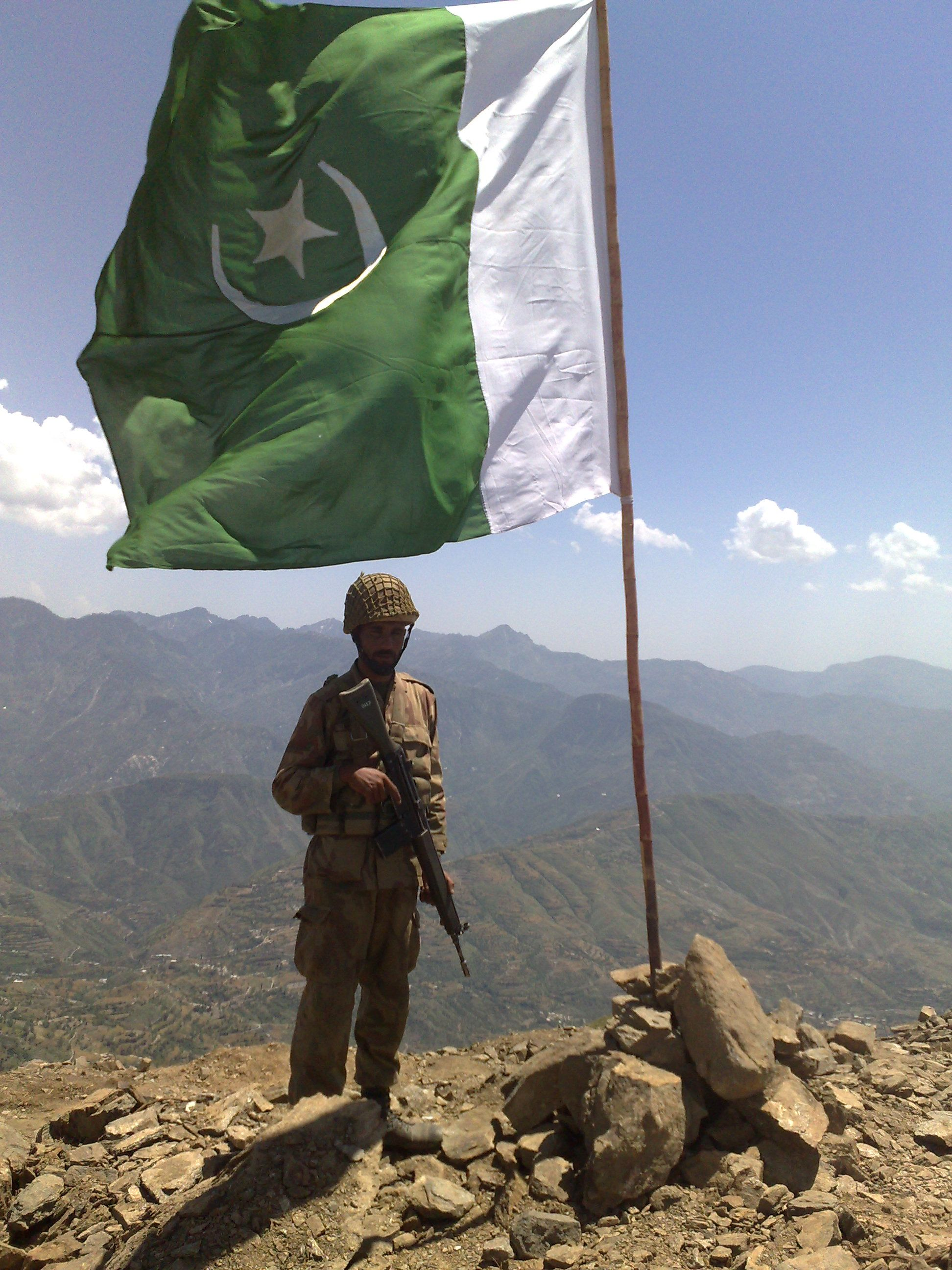
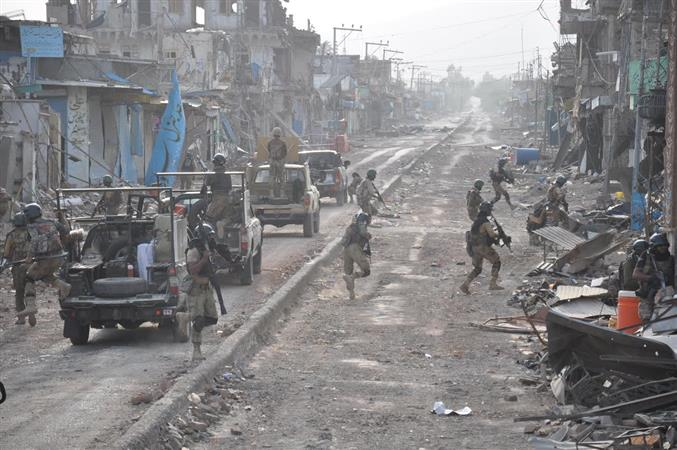
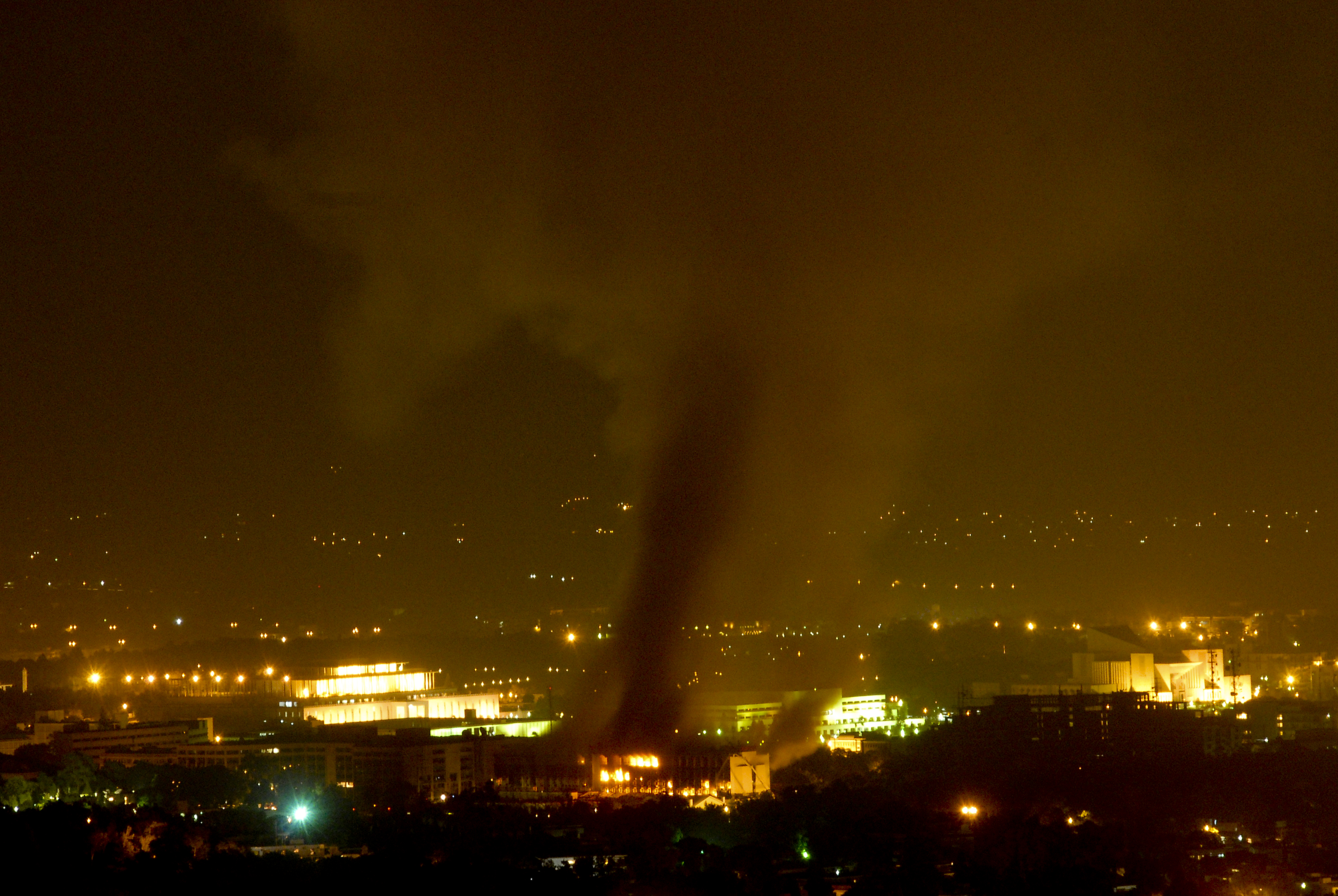
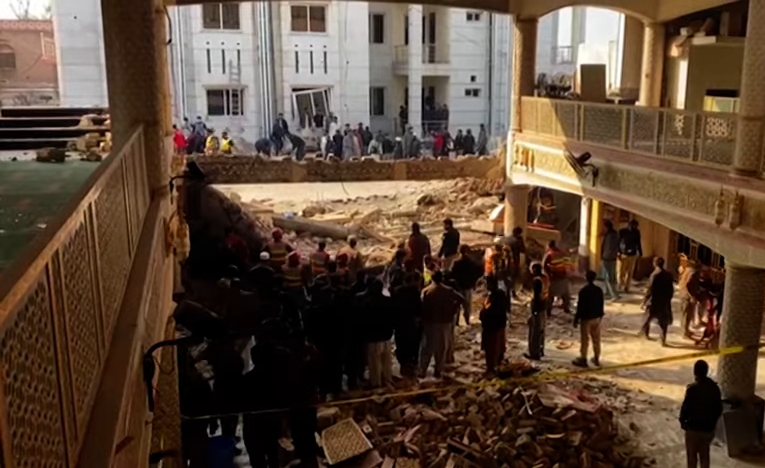
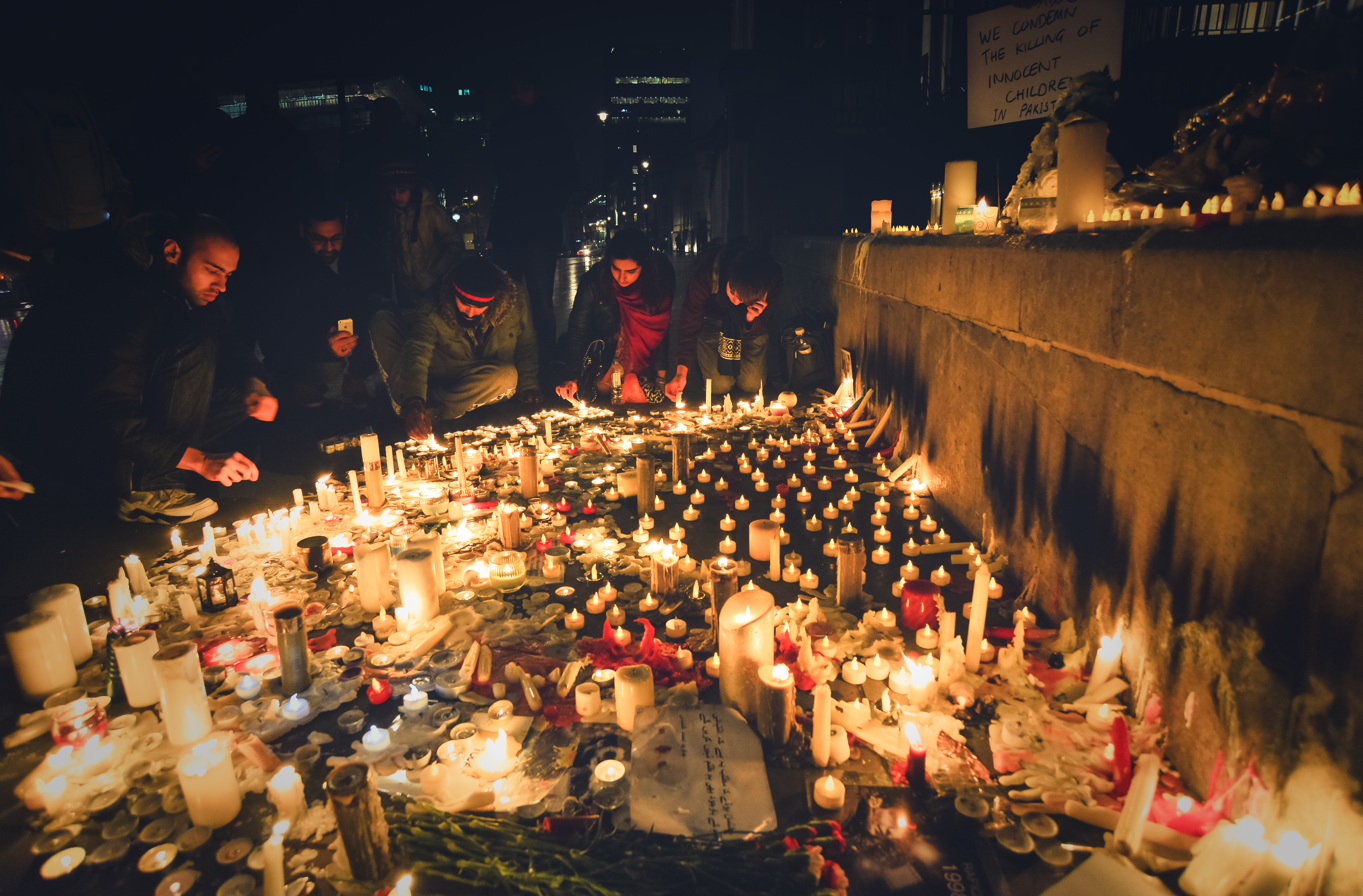
- From top, left to right: Pakistani soldier overlooks the Swat Valley during the Second Battle of Swat; Pakistani soldier at the highest point in the Swat Valley during Operation Black Thunderstorm; Pakistani forces during a clearance operation in Mir Ali, North Waziristan; View of the Islamabad Marriott Hotel after a bombing in September 2008; Interior view of the Police Lines mosque in Peshawar after a deadly bombing in January 2023; Candlelight vigil in London for the victims of the 2014 Peshawar school massacre
Date	16 March 2004 – present (22 years, 7 months, 2 weeks and 1 day) First phase: 16 March 2004 – 22 February 2017 (12 years, 11 months and 6 days); Second phase: 23 February 2017 – present (9 years, 8 months, 1 week and 1 day)
Location	Khyber Pakhtunkhwa, Pakistan
Status	Ongoing (low-level insurgency) First phase: First phase (War 2004–2017): (Beginning of war Order of Battle); Battle of Wanna; Operation al-Mizan; Battle of Mirali; Waziristan Accord (short-lived peace agreement in North Waziristan); Operation Sunrise; 2007 South Waziristan conflict; 2007 Kurram Agency conflict; Operation Rah-e-Haq (First Battle of Swat); Operation Zalzala; Angur Ada raid; Operation Sirat-e-Mustaqeem; Battle of Bajaur; Operation Black Thunderstorm; Operation Rah-e-Rast (Second Battle of Swat); Operation Rah-e-Nijat; 2009 Khyber Pass offensive; Operation Janbaz; Nizam-e-Adl Regulation 2009 (failed peace agreement); Mohmand Offensive; Orakzai and Kurram offensive; Killing of Osama bin Laden; 2011 Chitral cross-border attacks; Operation Koh-e-Sufaid; Operation Rah-e-Shahadat; Operation Khyber; Operation Zarb-e-Azb; Operation Ghazi; Second phase: Second phase (Insurgency 2017 – present): (Beginning of nationwide large scale operations against insurgency); Operation Ghazi; Operation Radd-ul-Fasaad; 2,600-kilometre Afghanistan–Pakistan border barrier fenced as of 2023; Large number of insurgents killed while some fled to Afghanistan; Heavy insurgent losses and substantial reduction in insurgent activity; Tribal areas merged into Pakistan, tribal law abolished and writ of constitution established as of 2018; End of drone strikes conducted by the United States in Pakistan; Jundallah, Tehreek-e-Khilafat, Jamaat-ul-Ahrar, and the Islamic Movement of Uzbekistan join ISIL; Jamaat-ul-Ahrar rejoins the TTP; 2022 Pakistani airstrikes in Afghanistan; Intermittent series of multilateral talks underway with groups specially with Tehrik-i-Taliban Pakistan; 2022 ceasefire ends; 2023 Chitral cross-border attacks; 2023 Kurram conflict; Deportation of 1.1 million foreigners illegally settling in Pakistan; 2024 Kurram conflict; Operation Azm-e-Istehkam launched in June 2024; Operation Sarbakaf launched on 29 July 2025; 2025 North Waziristan border clashes; Pakistan–Afghanistan clashes (2024–present); 2025 Pakistan–Afghanistan conflict; 2026 Afghanistan–Pakistan war
Territorial changes	Pakistan regains control of the Tribal Areas

Belligerents
Pakistan; Pakistan Armed Forces; Pakistan Army; Pakistan Air Force; Pakistan Navy; Frontier Corps; FC KPK (North); FC KPK (South); Federal Constabulary; Pakistan Police Service; Pakistan Levies; NATO; United States (drone strikes only, 2004–2018)	Pakistani Taliban; TNSM (Note: Merged with the TTP in 2007 following the Siege of Lal Masjid); Ittehad-ul-Mujahideen Pakistan; HGB Group; Harakat-e-Inqilab-e-Islami; Lashkar-e-Islam; Jamaat-ul-Ahrar (Note: operated independently from 2014-2020 before rejoining the TTP); Tehreek-e-Jihad Pakistan (allegedly); Al-Qaeda; AQIS; Turkistan Islamic Party (until 2017); Sipah-e-Sahaba (until 2018); Lashkar-e-Jhangvi (until 2024); Islamic State; Pakistan Province; Khorasan Province; Jundallah; IMU (Note: pro-Islamic State factions); JuA (until 2015)

Commanders and leaders
Pakistan: Pervez Musharraf #; Asif Ali Zardari; Benazir Bhutto †; Mamnoon Hussain #; Arif Alvi; Sanaullah Khan Niazi †; Yusuf Raza Gilani; Raja Pervez Ashraf; Nawaz Sharif; Shahid Khaqan Abbasi; Moin Haider †; Mushtaq Ahmed Baig †; Mustafa Kamal Barki †; Ameer Faisal Alavi †; Aslam Khan †; Haroon Bilour †; Bashir Ahmad Bilour †; Safwat Ghayur †; Imran Khan; Shehbaz Sharif; Ashfaq Pervez Kayani; Raheel Sharif; Qamar Javed Bajwa; Asim Munir; Kaleem Saadat; Tanvir Ahmed; Rao Qamar Suleman; Tahir Rafique Butt; Sohail Aman; Mujahid Anwar Khan; Zaheer Ahmad Babar; Afzal Tahir; Noman Bashir; Asif Sandila; Muhammad Zakaullah; Zafar Mahmood Abbasi; United States: George W. Bush; Barack Obama; Donald Trump; Donald Rumsfeld; Robert Gates; Leon Panetta; Chuck Hagel; Ash Carter; Jim Mattis	Pakistani Taliban: Noor Wali Mehsud; Maulana Fazlullah †; Khalid Mehsud †; Adnan Rashid; Mangal Bagh †; Hakimullah Mehsud †; Abdullah Mehsud †; Baitullah Mehsud †; Maulvi Nazir †; Hafiz Gul Bahadur; Chauhdry Muneeb ur Rehman Jatt; Omar Khalid †; Khalid Balti †; Azam Tariq †; Shahidullah Shahid †; Mullah Dadullah †; Wali-ur-Rehman †; Qari Hussain †; Faqir Mohammed (POW); Maulvi Omar (POW); Muslim Khan (POW); Hayatullah (POW); Shah Dauran †; Sher Muhammad Qusab †; Naik Muhammad Wazir †; Sufi Muhammad (POW); Al-Qaeda: Ayman al-Zawahiri †; Osama bin Laden †; Ilyas Kashmiri †; Abu Jihad al-Masri †; Atiyah Abd al-Rahman † Abu Laith al-Libi †; Abu Yahya al-Libi †; Abu-Zaid al Kuwaiti †; Saeed al-Masri †; Usama al-Kini †; Sheikh Swedan †; Sheikh Fateh †; Andan Shukrijumah †; Asim Umar †; Khalid Sheikh Mohammed (POW); Abu Faraj al-Libbi (POW) Ramzi bin al-Shibh (POW); Abu Zubaydah (POW); Islamic State: Abu Bakr al-Baghdadi †; Hafiz Saeed Khan †; Abdul Rahman Ghaleb † Abdul Rahim Muslim Dost (2014–2015); Usman Ghazi †; IMU Group: Usman Ghazi †; Tohir Yuldashev †; Najmiddin Jalolov †; ETIM Group: Emeti Yakov †; Memetimin Memet (WIA)

Strength
Pakistan; 200,000 Pakistani troops (est. 2010–2017); Unknown no. of air squadrons of Pakistan Air Force fighter jets, including JF-17, J-10c, and F-16 jets; ~20,000–40,000 Frontier Corpsmen; United States (Until 2018); UAV drones; CIA operatives; U.S. Special Operations Forces	~25,000 TTP militia (est. 2014); ~2,000 Lashkar-e-Islam militia (est. 2013); ~1,000 TNSM militia (est. 2012); 300–3,000 al-Qaeda militants (est. 2014); Jundallah: 12,000–20,000 (disputed); IMU: 500–1,000

Casualties and losses
Pakistan: 10,429 soldiers, paramilitary troops, and policemen killed (SATP; January 2026); 9,431 killed soldiers and LEAs and 14,583 wounded (CWP; August 2021); United States: 15 soldiers killed (2010)	37,391 militants killed (SATP; January 2026); 32,838 killed (CWP; August 2021)
- Total killed: 48,863 including 10,118 civilians (SATP; February 2025); 66,650 including 24,099 civilians (CWP; August 2021); 45,249 all over Pakistan (UCDP; 1989–2025) Over 3.44 million civilians displaced (2009); Over 6 million civilians displaced (2003–2019)

Since 2004, an insurgency (Note: Also known as the war in Northwest Pakistan) has been fought in the Pakistani province of Khyber Pakhtunkhwa by Islamist militant groups such as the Tehrik-i-Taliban Pakistan (TTP), Jundallah, Lashkar-e-Islam (LeI), the Tehreek-e-Nafaz-e-Shariat-e-Mohammadi (TNSM), Al-Qaeda, and their Central Asian allies such as the Islamic State – Khorasan Province (ISKP), Islamic Movement of Uzbekistan, East Turkistan Movement, Jamaat-ul-Ahrar, Ittihad-ul-Mujahideen Pakistan, and elements of organised crime. Before being transformed into an insurgency in 2017, the conflict was a war.

The armed conflict began in 2004 when tensions rooted in the Pakistan Army's search for Al-Qaeda fighters in its mountainous Waziristan region escalated into large-scale armed resistance. Pakistan's actions were presented as its contribution to the U.S. war on terror. The Al-Qaeda terrorists fled Afghanistan seeking refuge in the bordering Federally Administered Tribal Areas. Pakistan had already joined the US-led war on terror after the 9/11 attacks under Pervez Musharraf. However, after the U.S. invasion of Afghanistan in 2001, Al-Qaeda and Taliban fighters ventured across the Pakistan-Afghanistan border to seek refuge in the Federally Administered Tribal Areas (FATA). As a result, militants established a presence in several border districts in FATA. The insurgency turned into a critical issue for Pakistan when the Pakistan Army besieged Lal Masjid in Islamabad. The operation resulted in the TTP describing Pakistan as a "puppet of Western powers," amplifying its propaganda initiative and kickstarting its campaign of suicide bombings throughout the country.

Through several military campaigns, Pakistani forces pushed the TTP into neighbouring Afghanistan from where it continues to launch terrorist attacks on Pakistan. In particular, Operation Zarb-e-Azb resulted in the total loss of TTP territory in Pakistan, transitioning the conflict into an unconventional guerrilla campaign through sleeper cells.

In 2017, Pakistan began to fence the 2,600 km border it shares with Afghanistan, alongside constructing around 1,000 military installations in border regions to capitalise on gains made against militants. Moreover, FATA, under the 25th Amendment to the Constitution of Pakistan, was merged with Khyber Pakhtunkhwa province in 2018 to enhance administrative efficiency in the region.

Since the fall of Kabul in August 2021, Pakistan has been confronted with a renewed threat of terrorism as the TTP has amplified its attacks, relying on Taliban-led Afghanistan as a base for attacks and a reliable provider of support. Fresh recruits, easy access to abandoned US-made weapons, and a sanctuary under the Taliban have bolstered the TTP to continue its insurgency. In January 2026, the International Crisis Group stated that Pakistan was the country worst affected by the fall of Kabul.

== Background ==
In the aftermath of the Battle of Tora Bora in 2002, the Pakistan Army began formal troop deployment at the behest of the federal government. The conservative parties, most notably the Pakistan Muslim League, were very critical of such troop deployments in the region. The XI Corps, under its commander Lieutenant-General Jan Aurkzai, entered the Tirah Valley in the Khyber Agency for the first time since Pakistan's independence in 1947. The army troops later moved into the Shawal Valley of North Waziristan, eventually entering South Waziristan. A monitoring reconnaissance base was established by the Special Service Group [Navy] in 2003. Criticism of Musharraf and the United States grew in Peshawar by a massive communist party in 2003, demanding an end to the operations.

In 2003, the troubles mounted as the Tribes began to see military's deployment and repeated PAF's flights in the region as an act of subjugation. In 2003–04 public speeches, Musharraf repeatedly called for the eviction of the foreign fighters from the South Waziristan and justified the army deployments in the region despite the concerns. In December 2003, at least two assassination attempts against President Pervez Musharraf were traced to South Waziristan. The government responded by intensifying military pressure on the area. However, the fighting was costly: government forces sustained heavy casualties throughout 2004 and into early 2005, when the government switched to a tactic of negotiation instead of direct conflict.

== Outbreak of fighting ==
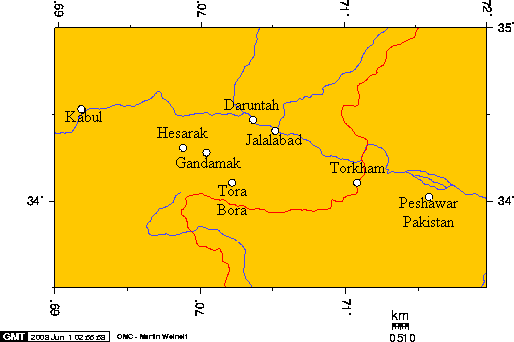
Military Intelligence map: In 2004, the military action took place to remove the terrorist elements when many foreign fighters found sanctuary after escaping from Tora Bora (lit. Black Caves) of Afghanistan, via Safed Koh range, to Wana of Pakistan.

On 16 March 2004, a bloody mountainous battle between the Pakistan Army troops and the foreign fighters of Al-Qaeda was fought in the White Mountains of South Waziristan. The Pakistani media speculated that Pakistan Army had surrounded a "high value target" in the mountainous region, possibly Al-Qaeda's then-second-in-command Ayman al-Zawahiri. According to the military intelligence in 2004, all militants were Chechens, Uzbeks, and Tajiks who were trying to flee Black Caves (Tora Bora of Afghanistan). After a week of the battle, the entire area was captured and as many as 400 Al-Qaeda operatives were apprehended by the Pakistan Army. The army did not capture Zawahiri. The ISPR later admitted that it was Soviet Uzbek Tohir Yo'ldosh who was surrounded, not Zawahiri.

By 2004, additional battalions were stationed by General Musharraf to help curb infiltration into Pakistan through its porous border. The Military Intelligence, Covert Action Division (CAD) and army troops found many caves and tunnels in White Mountain range used by the foreign fighters before the military action took place. The Military Intelligence accounts maintained that the tunnels were led into Afghanistan, possible Tora Bora region. Though it is difficult to know how effective the cordon was on the first night of the military suspension but the military intelligence accounts did confirm that many high-value foreign fighters might have escaped through these tunnels and caves back to Afghanistan.

On 7 October 2004, Musharraf approved the appointment of his close aide, General Ehsan ul Haq from ISI, who superseded seven colleagues; his appointment was brutally criticised by the media. After becoming the chairman joint chiefs, General Ehsan-ul-Haq oversaw the ground troops deployment of army only, while the air force and navy were kept out of the region.

=== Peace agreements ===
In April 2004, the Government of Pakistan signed the Shakai agreement, first of three peace agreements with militants in South Waziristan. It was signed by militia commander Naik Muhammad Wazir, but was immediately abrogated once Naik Muhammad was killed by an American Hellfire missile in June 2004.

The second one, Sararogha Peace Agreement, was signed in February 2005 with Nek's successor Baitullah Mehsud, which brought relative calm in the South Waziristan region. This deal would later, in September 2006, be mimicked in the neighbouring North Waziristan territory as the third and final truce, Miranshah Peace Accord, between the government and the militants. However, all of these truces would not have a substantial effect in reducing bloodshed. The latter two deals were officially broken in August 2007 with the start of Operation Silence which was initiated by Islamabad, and resulted in a tenfold increase in suicide attacks on Pakistan Armed Forces.

The strategy of keeping the air force and navy out from the conflict proved to be ineffective, as the violence spread out all over the country, and the army came under great pressure from the militants in 2004–07. In 2007, General Ehsan-ul-Haq admitted publicly that keeping the navy and the air force out of the conflict was a mistake.

== Conflict in the tribal areas (2005-2006) ==
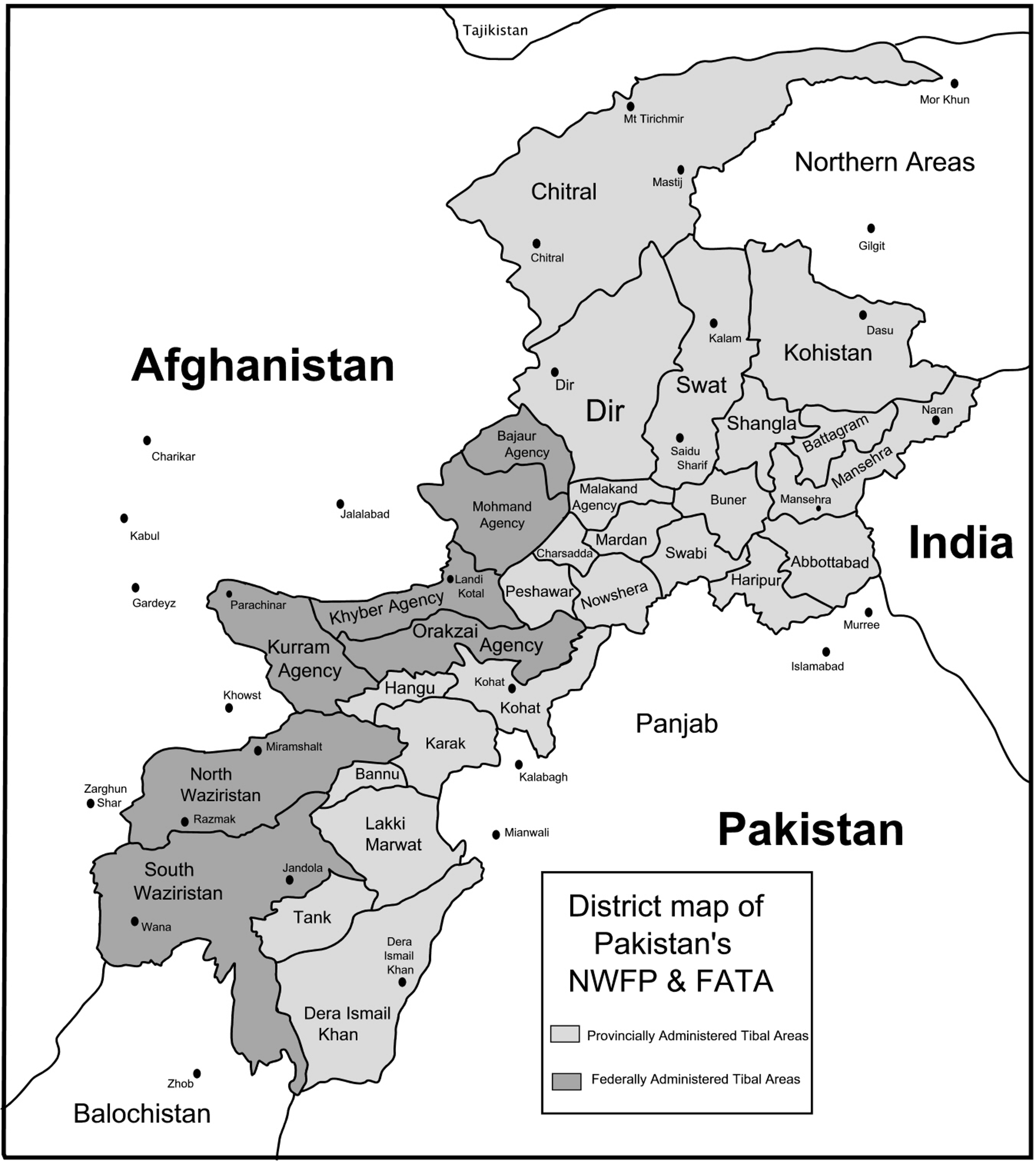
Air Intelligence map: Map showing the air domain of the districts of the Tribal areas (FATA) and the Khyber-Pakhtunkhwa province of Pakistan.

The ISI's Covert Action Division (CAD) and the Special Services Group (SSG) conducted a secret paramilitary operation to capture a high-ranking Al-Qaeda operative Abu Faraj al-Libbi on 4 May 2005, after a raid outside the town of Mardan, 50 kilometres (30 mi) northeast of Peshawar. His arrest was confirmed by the Government sources and noted as "al-Libbi was a high ranking Al-Qaeda official, rumored to be third after Osama bin Laden and Ayman al-Zawahiri." Al-Libbi replaced Khalid Shaikh Mohammed after his arrest in March 2003 in connection with the 11 September attacks. The Pakistan government arrested al-Libbi and held him on charges in relation to being a chief planner in two assassination attempts on the life of President Pervez Musharraf in December 2003.

On 13 January 2006, the United States Air Force launched an airstrike on the village of Damadola. The attack occurred in the Bajaur tribal area, about 7 km (4 1/2 mi) from the Afghan border, and killed at least 18 people, mostly children and women. The attack again targeted Ayman al-Zawahiri, but later evidence suggests he was not there.

=== Ceasefire ===
On 21 June 2006, pro-Tehrik-i-Taliban Pakistan militants in the Bannu region of North Waziristan stated they shot down a Bell military helicopter that was reported to have crashed. The government denied missile fire as the cause, stating it was due to technical faults. The helicopter had taken off from a base camp in Bannu at around 7 am for Miramshah and crashed 15 minutes later into the Baran Dam in the Mohmandkhel area on Wednesday morning. Four soldiers were killed while three others were rescued. On the same day, militants killed an inspector and two constables on a road connecting Bannu and the main town of Miranshah.

On 21 June 2006, Afghan Taliban leader Sirajuddin Haqqani issued a decree that it was not (Afghan) Taliban policy to fight the Pakistan Army. However, the Tehrik-i-Taliban Pakistan intentionally did not circulate the decree in North Waziristan thereby keeping pressure on the government.

=== Waziristan peace accord ===
In 2006, a peace deal between two tribes in Kurram Agency over the issue of distribution of irrigation water was implemented. Promptly, the government accepted the tribal recommendation to sign a peace deal with the militants in North Waziristan. Signed on 5 September 2006, the agreement was called the "Waziristan Accord"— an agreement among tribal leaders, militants, and the Pakistan government was signed in Miranshah, North Waziristan. to end all fighting. The agreement includes the following provisions:

- The Pakistan military will help reconstruct infrastructure in tribal areas of North and South Waziristan.
- The Pakistan military will not tolerate any assistance to intruders in North Waziristan, and will monitor actions in the region.
- The Pakistan government is to compensate tribal leaders for the loss of life and property of innocent tribesmen.
- "Foreigners" (informally understood to be foreign terrorists) are not allowed to use Pakistani territory for any terrorist activity anywhere in the world.
- 2,500 foreigners who were originally held on suspicion of having links to the Taliban were to be detained for necessary action against them.

The agreement, dubbed the Waziristan accord, has been viewed by some political commentators as a success for Pakistan. Even the military commander of the Pakistan Army, Lieutenant-General Ali Jan Aurakzai, also welcomed the peace agreement as "unprecedented in tribal history" and credited the intertribal jirga with amicably resolving a complicated issue within a few weeks.

Others were far more critical, seeing it as allowing militants to regroup and reorganise after military operations. However, in 2007, accord's chief architect and chairman joint chiefs General Ehsan-ul-Haq openly admitted to the media that the only ground troops deployment was wrong as the "Waziristan truce went wrong".

=== 2006 Madrassah air strike ===
On 30 October 2006, United States conducted a deadly missile airstrike on a madrassa in the Bajaur region bordering Afghanistan. The strike killed 82 seminary students. Long War Journal blamed U.S. for the air strike as only U.S. was able to conduct precision night strikes in the region.

Sahibzada Haroonur Rashid, MNA from Bajaur Agency, resigned from the National Assembly on Monday to protest against the bombing of a madrassah in his constituency.

In retaliation for the attack the militants fired a series of RPG rockets on the heavily fortified security camp of Governor and Lieutenant-General Ali Jan Aurakzai; his convey escaped unharmed on 8 November 2006. The same day, the militants coordinated a suicide bomb attack on a military base in Dargai, about 100 km north of Peshawar. The suicide attack killed nearly 42 Pakistani soldiers and wounding 20 others. Military intelligence investigators later testified in media that suicide bombing had a direct link with the air strike.

== Insurgency in the north, 2007 ==
As early as 2007, the northern region had been suffering with an insurgency and President Musharraf was increasingly under great pressure from the militants when several army operations outlined mixed results. In March, his government signed a peace treaty with Fakir Mohamad, the main militant leader in Bajaur. Militant groups then held three districts in the Federally Administered Tribal Areas: South Waziristan, North Waziristan and Bajaur Agency.

=== Waziri–Uzbek tensions ===
In South Waziristan, the Uzbek militancy had been growing as many former Soviet fighters-turned-militants were reportedly seen encircling in the area; many of the military intelligence reports indicated the movements of former Soviet fighters in the region, mostly Uzbeks and Chechens from the troubled areas of the Russian Federation.

In 2007, the fighting sparked between the Uzbek fighters and the native militant groups by the killing of Arab fighter Saiful Adil, an Al-Qaeda operative, blamed on the Uzbeks fighters by Maulvi Nazir, described as a top pro-Taliban militant commander in the region. According to the other version, the fighting started after Maulvi Nazir, whom the government claimed had come over to its side, ordered the Uzbek followers of former Soviet fighters, Tohir Abduhalilovich Yo'ldoshev and Kamolitdinich Jalolov, to disarm, both were formerly the close confidants of Osama bin Laden.

It was also preceded by clashes between Uzbek fighters and local militants, in which 19 people died.

=== Defeat of the Islamic Movement of Uzbekistan ===
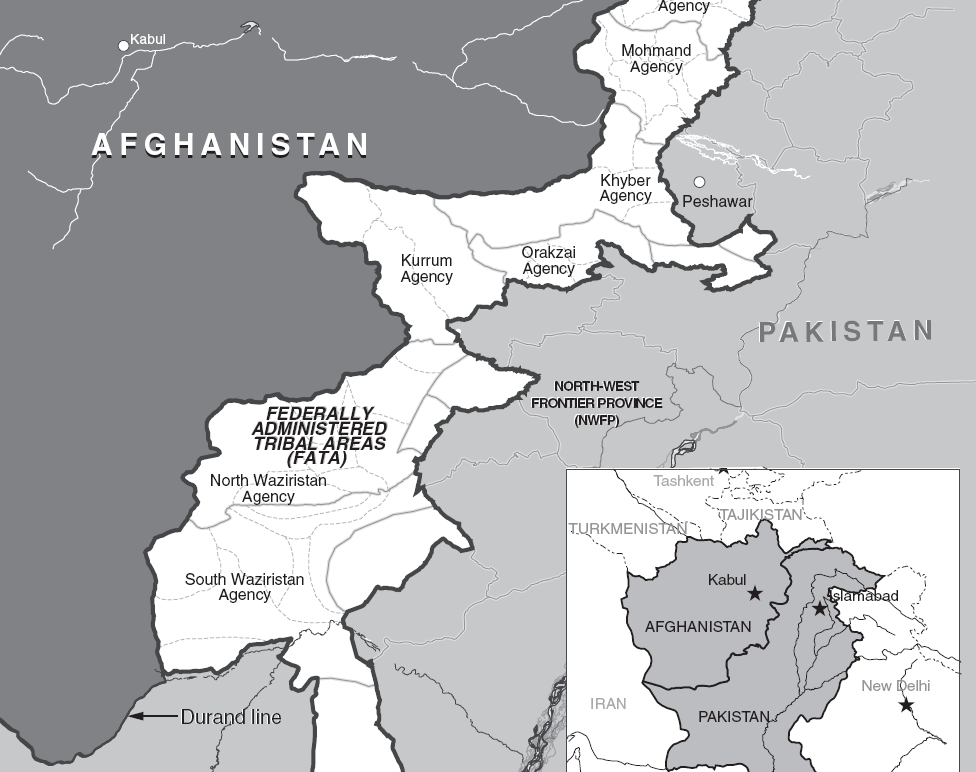
Military intelligence map: In 2007, the Uzbek IMU dominated the South Waziristan before forced out from the country by tribes and the armed forces in 2008.

According to the military intelligence officials in 2007, there were many key reasons why the Uzbeks had been dominating the area. Military intelligence reports testified that the locals were scared to mobilise the opposition against the Uzbek militants due to their reputations as fierce fighters with long memories and very strong military backgrounds. Some of these fighters used to be soldiers and officers in the Soviet Army during the Russian invasion of Afghanistan in the 1980s, and some of them had military training given by the CIA during the 1990s; hence they were experts in guerrilla warfare. The IMU fighters had little to lose and it was difficult for them to escape somewhere else. They could not go back to Uzbekistan, and after 2009, re-infiltration back to Afghanistan also started becoming more difficult. Thus, they made Waziristan their home. Local militants allied to the tribesmen were reported attacking and seizing the IMU's private jail in Azam Warsak. The Pakistan Army intelligence said it did not intend to step in, but witnesses say government artillery fired on the Uzbek fighters they set up to fight the tribesmen.

Heavy fighting resumed on 29 March 2007, ending a week-long ceasefire between tribal fighters and foreign militants. According to initial reports, tribesmen attacked a checkpoint manned by former Soviet Uzbek fighters and captured two of them. The clashes also left one tribal fighter dead and three wounded. The following day, a senior Pakistani official announced that 52 people were killed during the past two days; 45 of them were Uzbeks and the rest tribesmen. One of Maulvi Nazir's aides put the death toll at 35 Uzbeks fighters and ten tribal fighters. However, residents in the area said that the death toll on both sides was inflated.

The conflict further escalated on 2 April when a council of elders declared jihad against foreign militants and started to raise an army of tribesmen. According to Pakistani intelligence officials, heavy fighting concentrated in the village of Doza Ghundai left more than 60 people dead, including 50 foreigners, ten tribal fighters and one Pakistani soldier. Intelligence officials also said that "dozens of Uzbeks" had surrendered to tribal forces and that many bunkers used by militants were seized or destroyed.

On 12 April 2007, the army general in charge of South Waziristan said that tribal fighters had cleared the Soviet Uzbeks out of the valleys surrounding Wana and the foreign fighters had been pushed back into the mountains on the Afghan border. Four days later, the local tribesmen has urged Islamabad to resume control of law and order in the area.

=== Lal Masjid siege and truce broken ===
The siege of Lal Masjid was one of the serious breaches in the conflict and escalated the conflict in the summer of 2007. On 3 July 2007, the armed militia of Lal Masjid and its supporters inspired by the tribal fighters clashed with the Pakistan Police and Pakistan Rangers outside the mosque in Islamabad after the female students from the mosque affiliated Jamia Hafsa attacked and stoned the nearby MoE secretariat. Their resultant faceoff with the military escalated, despite the intervention of then-ruling PML(Q) leaders Shuja'at Hussain and Ijaz-ul-Haq. The Pakistan Rangers, aided by the Pakistan Army and the Special Service Group immediately put up a siege around the mosque and madrassah complex which lasted until 11 July and resulted in 108 deaths. This represented the main catalyst for the conflict and eventual breakdown of the truce that existed between Pakistan and the Taliban groups. Already during the siege, there were several attacks in Waziristan in retaliation for the siege.

As the siege in Islamabad ensued, several attacks on Pakistan army troops in Waziristan were reported. First attack was reported on 14 July 2007 when a suicide bomber attacked a Pakistan Army convoy killing 25 soldiers and wounding 54. Second attack was on 15 July 2007, two suicide bombers attacked another Pakistan Army convoy killing 16 soldiers and five civilians and wounding another 47 people. And in a separate incident, a fourth suicide bomber attacked a police headquarters killing 28 police officers and recruits and wounding 35 people. The assault on the Red Mosque prompted Islamic militants along the border with Afghanistan to scrap the controversial Waziristan Accord with Musharraf.

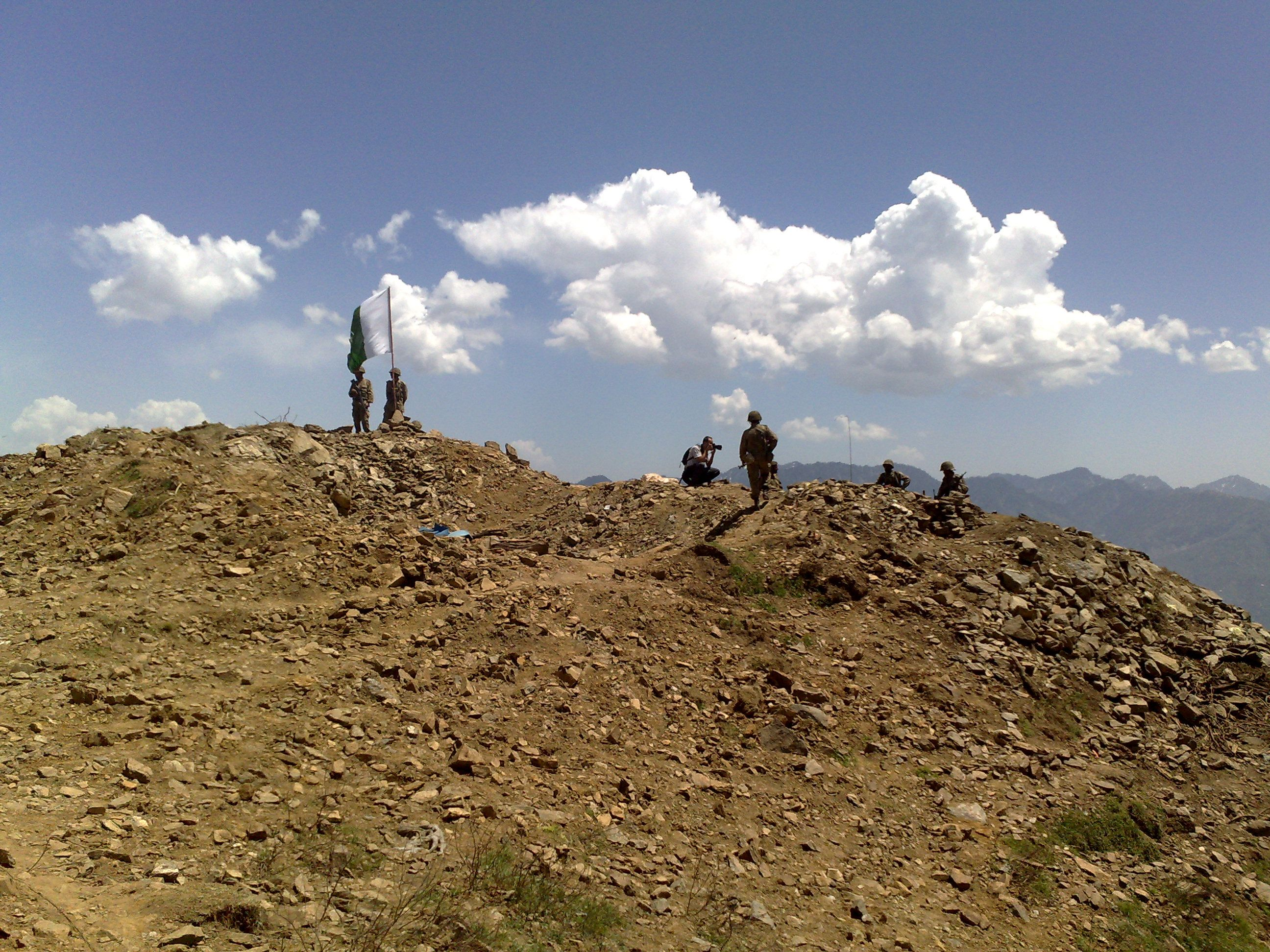
Pakistan airborne forces captured the highest point in Swat valley, 2009.

Under pressured, Musharraf moved the army in large concentration of troops into Waziristan and engaged in fierce clashes with militants in which at least 100 militants were killed, including wanted terrorist and former Guantanamo Bay detainee, Abdullah Mehsud. The militants also struck back by attacking Army convoys, security check points and sending suicide bombers killing dozens of soldiers and police and over 100 civilians. In one month of fighting during the period from 24 July to 24 August 2007, 250 militants and 60 soldiers were killed. On 2 September 2007, just a few dozen militants led by Baitullah Mehsud managed to ambush a 17-vehicle army convoy and captured an estimated 247 soldiers without a shot being fired, an event that shocked the nation. Several officers were among the captured, the public criticism grew hard on Musharraf.

After the army returned to Waziristan, they garrisoned the areas and set up check-points, but the militants hit hard. In mid-September, the TTP and other forces attacked a number of Pakistan army outposts all across North and South Waziristan. This resulted in some of the heaviest fighting of the war. Following the Lal Masjid Siege, the first outpost was attacked and overrun by the militants resulting in the capture of twelve Pakistani soldiers. The next day on 13 September 2007, a suicide bomber in Tarbela Ghazi attacked a Pakistan army base, destroying the main mess hall and killing 20 members of the Special Service Group's Zarrar Commando Unit; Pakistan's most elite army unit. A series of attacks ensued and by 20 September 2007, a total of five Pakistan Army military outposts had been overrun and more than 25 soldiers captured. More than 65 soldiers were either killed or captured and almost 100 wounded. A little over two weeks later, the Army responded with helicopter gunships and ground troops. They hit militant positions near the town of Mir Ali. In heavy fighting over four days, 257 people were killed, including 175 militants, 47 soldiers and 35 civilians.

=== Operation Rah-e-Haq ===
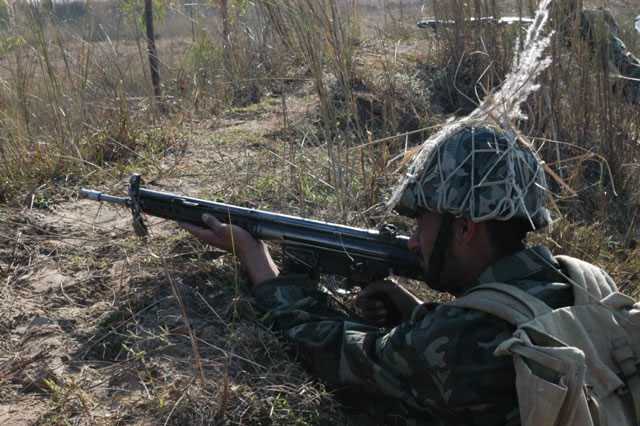
A soldier of Pakistan army in combat position.

By the end of October 2007, another heavy fighting erupted in the Swat district of the Khyber Pakhtunkhwa Province between the Frontier Police and the large portion of far right-wing TNSM organisation, under the command of Maulana Fazlullah who was trying to impose Sharia law. In a response, the military deployed a combat brigade under a local Brigadier-General to confront them. After week of heavy fighting with the brigade combat teams, the battle came to a standstill with both sides suffering heavy casualties. On 3 November 2007, around 220 paramilitary soldiers and policemen surrendered or deserted after a military position on a hill-top and two police stations were overrun. This left the TNSM in control of most of the Swat district.

The fighting in Swat is the first serious insurgent threat from terrorist groups in what is known as a settled area of Pakistan. Following this, foreign fighters of Al-Qaeda loyal to TNSM's Maulana Fazlullah tried to implement strict Islamic law in November 2007. In November 2007, another brigade combat team was deployed with the help of helicopter gunships to crush the uprising. By the beginning of December 2007, the fighting had ended and the military recaptured Swat. Almost 400 foreign fighters of Maulana Fazlullah were dead along with 15 Pakistani soldiers and 20 civilians in the military suspension. Despite the victory by the military, the foreign fighters of TNSM slowly re-entered Swat over the coming months and started engaging security forces in battles that lasted throughout 2008. By early February 2009, the whole district was in military control.

=== 2007 Rawalpindi bombings and state of emergency ===
On 3 September 2007, the two coordinated suicide bombers targeted an ISI bus and a line of cars carrying ISI officers. The bus attack killed a large number of Defence Ministry workers and the other attack killed an Army colonel. In all 31 people, 19 soldiers and 12 civilians, were killed.

Two months later on 24 November, another military intelligence (MI) bus was again attacked. Almost everyone on the bus was killed. Another bomber blew up at a military checkpoint. 35 people were killed, almost all military officials. Facing with an intense criticism from media regarding the Red Mosque siege, President Musharraf became involved in a confrontation with the country's judiciary who began taking suo motu actions against the directives issued by Musharraf and his Prime Minister Shaukat Aziz on issues involving the forming of the investigative commission on Red Mosque as well as hearings of victims of the siege, the findings of missing persons, issuing verdicts against the controversial NRO and privatisation, and issuing subpoena regarding the extrajudicial killing of Akbar Bugti, in 2006. Failing to reach a compromise and subdue the judiciary, Musharraf authorised the decree of sacking around 70 senior justices including, the Chief Justice Iftikhar Chaudhry, immediately and declared the state of emergency on 9 November 2007. Virtually suspending the supreme law of the land, the constitution of the country, the massive nationwide demonstration and anger erupted against President Musharraf.

Though, this action and its responses are generally related to the controversies surrounding the re-election of Musharraf during the presidential election that had occurred on 6 October 2007, and also was claimed by the government to be the reaction to the actions by militants in Waziristan.

=== 2008 general election ===
On 27 December 2007, Pakistani opposition leader and former Prime Minister Benazir Bhutto was assassinated upon leaving a political rally for the Pakistan People's Party (PPP) in Rawalpindi, Pakistan. A suicidal assassin reportedly fired shots in Bhutto's direction just prior to detonating an explosive pellet-laden vest, killing approximately 24 people and wounding many more.

Ultimately, President General Musharraf and his military establishment blamed the attack on Al-Qaeda, but this was contradicted following day, when Baitullah Mehsud sent a statement to the media saying that he and Al-Qaeda had "no involvement in the murder of the former Prime Minister", and that they believed that Musharraf was responsible. The violence spread all over the country and national media broadcast the wave of violence across the country that left 58 people dead, including four police officers. Most of the violence was directed at Musharraf and his political party, PML(Q). Opposition parties, notably the PPP, branded PML(Q) as "Qatil League" (lit. Murderer's League). Benazir Bhutto had previously survived an assassination attempt made on her life during her homecoming which left 139 people dead and hundreds wounded.

== Escalation of the conflict and Pakistan's military response ==
Military campaigns by Pakistan Armed Forces since 2002
#	Campaign	Date	location	Results
	Operation al-Mizan	2002–2006	North Waziristan	Stalemate between Islamic militants and Government of Pakistan.: Waziristan Accord signed between militants and Pakistan Army; Withdrawal of Pakistani forces from Waziristan; Waziristan fell out of writ of control Government of Pakistan for 12 years since 2002 till beginning of Operation Zarb-e-Azb in 2014.
	Operation Rah-e-Haq	25 October 2007– 8 December 2007	Swat Valley and Shangla	Pakistani victory: Led to the short-lived 2009 ceasefire; Sharia implemented in Swat; Ceasefire ended in the decisive Second Battle of Swat.
	Operation Zalzala	January 2008 – May 2008	Spinkai, South Waziristan	Pakistani victory: Following the operation, the Tehrik-i-Taliban Pakistan (TTP) offered a truce and peace negotiations resulting in a suspension of violence.; In spite of the victory in the operation, on 21 May 2008 Pakistan signed a peace agreement with the Tehrik-i-Taliban Pakistan (TTP).; Short-lived peace in South Waziristan
	Operation Sirat-e-Mustaqeem	28 June 2008 – 9 July 2008	Bara	Pakistani victory: Pakistan Army gained control of strategic town of Bara on the outskirts of Peshawar.; The Peshawar was secured from the threat of militant takeover.; Destruction of LeI command and training centers
	Operation Sherdil	7 August 2008 – 28 February 2009	Bajaur Agency	Decisive Pakistani victory: Bajaur fell back under Government control; Militant fled across border into Kunar Afghanistan; Enduring peace in Bajaur
	Operation Black Thunderstorm	26 April 2009 – 14 June 2009	Swat; Buner; Lower Dir; Shangla	Decisive Pakistani victory: Districts returned to Pakistani control; High-ranking TTP leadership taken as POW; TTP's control confined to four agencies of FATA, namely, North Waziristan, Kurram, Khyber and Orakzai.; Mainland Khyber Pakhtunkhwa secured; Enduring peace across Malakand division
	Operation Rah-e-Rast	16 May 2009 – 15 July 2009	Swat	Decisive Pakistani victory: Sub-Operation of Black Thunderstorm specifically targeted to flush out militants from Swat; Swat returned to government control; Multiple Tehrik-i-Taliban Pakistan commanders captured or killed; Ensured long-term peace in Swat
	Operation Rah-e-Nijat	19 June 2009 – 12 December 2009	South Waziristan Agency	Decisive Pakistani victory: The military occupied the town of Kaniguram, a stronghold of former Russians fighters and Uzbeks led by the Islamic Movement of Uzbekistan.; Senior Taliban, Uzbek, Russian, and Al-Qaeda leadership abandoned their posts and escaped to neighbouring Afghanistan; On 12 December 2009, the military took the control of the entire South Waziristan into the government control.; Pakistani forces established government writ in South Waziristan till Afghanistan-Pakistan border.; Enduring Peace in South Waziristan
	2009 Khyber Pass Offensive	1 September 2009 – 30 September 2009	Khyber Agency	Pakistani victory: NATO supply lines across Torkham border secured; Trade route between Afghanistan-Pakistan secured on National Highway 5.
	Operation Khwakh Ba De Sham	September 2009–21 January 2011	Kurram Agency; Orakzai Agency	Pakistani victory: 100% Orakzai and 90% of Kurram returned to Pakistani control; Militants fled to white mountains of Afghanistan Pakistan border; Sporadic militant attacks from white mountains continued in Kurram Agency
	Operation Brekhna	3 November 2009 – 20 December 2012	Mohmand Agency	Decisive Pakistani victory: Mohmand Agency fell back into the government control; Leadership of TTP fled to Afghanistan; Did not kill or capture Ayman al-Zawahiri; Enduring peace in Mohmand
	Operation Koh-e-Sufaid	4 July 2011 – 18 August 2011	Kurram Agency	Decisive Pakistani victory: Militants flushed out from white mountains of Koh-e-Sufaid on Afghanistan Pakistan border in Kurram Agency.; Thall-Parachinar transit route secured at Kharlachi border.; Militants fled across Afghanistan-Pakistan border; Kurram Agency effectively secured from militant attacks originating from Koh-e-Sufaid range.; Gains of Orakzai and Kurram offensive consolidated; Militants continued to maintain presence in mountains of strong presence in Tirah Valley
	Operation Rah-e-Shahadat	5 April 2013 – 30 June 2013	Tirah Valley	Decisive Pakistani victory: Militants flushed out from Tirah Valley; Headquarters of Lashkar-e-Islam destroyed; TTP and LeI leadership fled across Afghanistan; Militants continued to pose threat to Khyber Agency from across the border.
	Operation Zarb-e-Azb	12 June 2014 – 22 February 2017	North-Waziristan Agency	Decisive Pakistani victory: The last remaining agency of FATA, North Waziristan Agency descended back under Pakistani control.; The headquarters of TTP at Miranshah was destroyed.; Pakistani forces recaptured last remaining valley of Shawal on Pakistan–Afghanistan border by early 2016.; The civilians deaths from 3000 in 2012 to 600 in 2016.; War in North-West Pakistan was reduced to low-intensity insurgency; National Action Plan conceived to fight extremism
	Operation Khyber	7 October 2014 – 21 August 2017	Khyber Agency	Decisive Pakistani victory: extension of Operation Zarb-e-Azb; Area from Bara till the border of Tirah Valley returned to government control under Operation Khyber-1; Under Operation Khyber-2 the main Tirah Valley cleared and returned under government control by 15 June 2015, marking the first anniversary of Operation Zarb-e-Azb; Area beyond Tirah Valley returned to government control under Khyber-3 that ended in July 2017; The last valley in Tirah, Rajgal Valley, located on Pakistan-Afghanistan border, was recaptured and secured by 21 August 2017.; In Operation Khyber three agencies of FATA namely, Kurram, Khyber and Orakzai agencies were secured from all sides.; By mid-2017 more or less Government of Pakistan reestablished its authority over more or less 98% of the lost erstwhile FATA.; Fencing work began Afghanistan-Pakistan border.; Ensured long-term peace in Khyber, Kurram and Orakzai.
	Operation Radd-ul-Fasaad	22 February 2017– November 2022	Across Pakistan	Pakistani tactical victory Strategic failure: Unlike previous military campaigns operation was not aimed at regaining lost territory but to purge Pakistan of sleeper cells that escaped across country; 375,000 intelligence-based operations conducted as of 2021; Afghanistan-Pakistan border barrier erected with 1000 military forts to man the border.; According to Delhi-based South Asian Terrorism Portal (SATP) 2019 was post peaceful year for Pakistan since the time of start of insurgency in 2004, the suicide attacks in Pakistan in 2019 was decreased to eight from record high of 85 in 2009.; The seven tribal agencies of FATA merged into Khyber Pakhtunkhwa for effective governance in 2018.; Resurgence of New wave of terrorism since fall of Kabul in 2021
	Operation Azm-e-Istehkam	22 June 2024– Till date	Across Pakistan and Afghanistan	Ongoing

In January 2008, the foreign fighters overran Sararogha Fort, and may have overrun a fort in Ladah as well. Both forts are in South Waziristan, and were held by the Pakistan Army. After the general elections in 2008, the army's fighting capability was depleted under the command of President Musharraf and many in the media had scrutinised the role of the army in the national politics. On 25 February 2008, a suicide bomber struck in the garrison-town of Rawalpindi which targeted and killed top military medic and Medical Corps Surgeon-General, Lieutenant-General Mushtaq Baig, along with two more soldiers and five civilians.

In a secretive appointment by Musharraf personally, General Baig had been an operational commander of the army fighting in the region and was the highest-level military official to be assassinated since 1971 war. In 2008, General Musharraf was soon relieved off his command, succeeding General Ishfaq Pervez Kiani as chief of army staff. Events led by the Lawyers' Movement pushed Musharraf to downfall, followed by the consolidated impeachment movement led by Prime minister Yousaf Raza Gillani ousted Musharraf from the presidency in 2008. The new socialist government led by Prime minister Yousaf Raza Gillani of the PPP made critical decisions and appointment in the key combatant staff of the armed forces, including the new chief of naval staff (Admiral Noman Bashir) and endorsing air chief marshal Rao Soleman as chief of air staff; all in late 2008.

The upcoming and then-newly appointed Chairman Joint Chiefs General Tariq Majid formalised a plan and strategy to tackle the insurgency. Terming as "tri-services framework (TSW)", the chairman joint chiefs emphasised the role of inter-services to tackle the insurgency with full force, and joint army–navy–airforce "efforts that are synergized within a framework of jointness and inter-operability to meet present and future challenges". His plan was submitted to Prime minister Yousaf Raza Gillani who approved the new strategy, which followed the new order of battle and new deployments of combat units of joint army–navy–air force in the north-western region. In the meantime, military leadership under General Kayani vowed to take fight against militancy to its logical end. General Kayani initiated series of military campaigns in different regions of North-West fell in the hands of militants beginning with Operation Sherdil aimed to flush out militants from Bajaur Agency. Overall, Kayani's tenure witnessed nine major operations and recaptured almost 90% of the lost territories of the North-Western Frontier Province and FATA. The last remaining agency of North Waziristan and parts of Khyber Agency were recaptured by 2016 by Kayani's successors General Raheel Sharif and Qamar Javed Bajwa. Thus, General Ashfaq Pervez Kayani's tenure considered pivotal in Pakistan's fight against terrorism during which Pakistan swift its gear from defensive to the offensive mode.

=== Operation Zalzala ===
After a brief intense change in chain of command in the Pakistan Armed Forces, a full-fledged military operation called 'Zalzala (lit. earthquake) was undertaken by 14th Army Division in January with the goal of flushing out Baitullah Mehsud's TTP fighters from the area. The area had previously been a more or less safe zone for militants, with some villagers providing them support and shelter. The operation was a tactical success, and scores of militants were killed during the operation. Within three days, the armed forces were in control of the area. The army later captured a few other villages and small towns as part of their attempt to pressure Baitullah Mehsud.

However, the operation led to a huge displacement of local population and the local Emanzai Tribe. According to the GOC of the 14th Army Division's Major-General Tariq Khan, about 200,000 men, women and children, were displaced. Khalid Aziz, former chief secretary of Khyber Pakhtunkhwa and expert on tribal affairs, said the displacement was "one of the biggest in tribal history".

=== Bajaur offensive ===
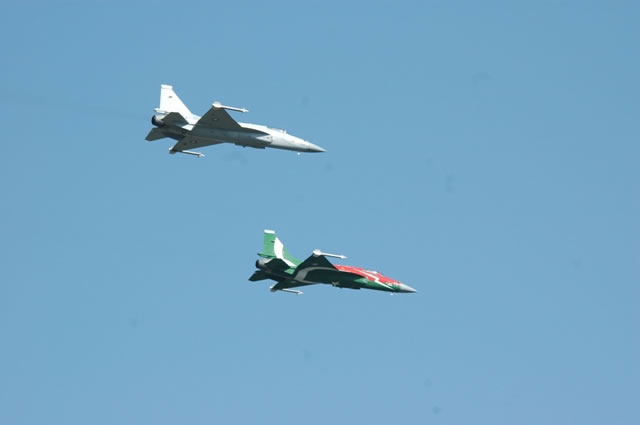
Locally built JF-17s were put on combat test in the South Waziristan offensive

Earlier on 7 February 2008, the TTP had offered a truce to Musharraf and peace negotiations resulting in a suspension of violence. On 21 May 2008, the Government signed a peace agreement with the Tehrik-i-Taliban Pakistan (TTP).

Despite the agreement sporadic fighting continued until late June and escalated with the takeover of the town of Jandola on 24 June, by the militants. Around 22 pro-government tribal fighters were captured and executed by the TTP at that time. On 28 June 2008, Pakistan Army started another offensive against militia fighters in Kyhber, codenamed Sirat-e-Mustaqeem (lit. Righteous Path). The military took control of a key town and demolished an insurgent group's building. In this offense, one militant was reportedly killed while two soldiers died in Swat valley. The operation was halted in early July. On 19 July 2008, clashes erupted between the TTP and a faction of pro-government Taliban militants. The fighting ended with 10–15 of the pro-government fighters were killed and another 120 were captured. Among the captured were two commanders who were tried under "Islamic" law by the Taliban and then executed.

On 21 July 2008, heavy fighting with another Militant group, the BLA in Baluchistan Province, killed 32 militants, 9 soldiers and 2 civilians. More than two dozen militants were captured and a large weapons cache was found. Between 28 July and 4 August 2008, heavy fighting flared up in the northwestern Swat valley leaving 94 militants, 28 civilians and 22 soldiers and policemen, were dead.

On 6 August 2008, the heavy ground fighting erupted in the Loisam area of the Bajaur District. The Loisam lies on the strategically important road leading towards the main northwestern city of Peshawar. The fighting started when hundreds of foreign fighters poured into the area and began attacking armed forces. After four days of fighting on 10 August 2008, the military was forced to withdraw from the area. It resulted in confirmed killing of 100 militants and 9 soldiers, and another 55 soldiers were missing, at least three dozen of them captured by the militants. While the fighting was going on in Bajaur, in the Buner area of Khyber Pakhtunkhwa Province, the militants killed at least nine policemen in an attack on a check post. The checkpoint was then abandoned, and the army troops withdrew to Khar, the main town of Bajaur Agency. There were reports that the town of Khar was then besieged by tribal militants.

On 21 August 2008, in response to the military offensive in Bajaur, two suicide bombers attacked the POF Laboratories in Wah while workers were changing shifts. The attack killed at least 70 people.

=== Tensions between tribal militias and the Pakistani Taliban ===
As military retreat from Bajaur Agency, the Pakistani tribal elders began organising a private army of approximately 30,000 tribesmen to fight the TTP, with the support of the Provincial government in September 2008. This local private military company, known as lashkar (lit. brigade), had composed of Pakistani tribesmen who began burning the houses of militant commanders in Bajaur and vowed to fight them until they are expelled. During this campaign, the Lashkar torched the house of local militant commander named Naimatullah, who had occupied several government schools and converted them into seminaries. A tribal elder named Malik Munsib Khan quoted in media that tribes would continue their struggle until the foreign fighters were expelled from the area, adding that anyone found sheltering militants would be fined one million rupees and their houses will be burned. The tribesmen also torched two important centres of local militant activity and gained control of tribal areas.

One of the main motivations for this activity was the operations that were taking place in the FATA that had displaced some 300,000 people while dozens of citizens had been killed in clashes between the militants and military. Since the start of operations against the foreign fighters, some 150,000 tribesmen have sided with them.

The American military proposals outlined an intensified effort to enlist tribal leaders in the frontier areas of Pakistan in the fight against Al-Qaeda. The proposal was modelled in part on a similar effort by American forces in Iraq that had been hailed as a success in fighting foreign insurgents there. But it raised the question of whether such partnerships can be forged without a significant American military presence in Pakistan. The American military raised great questions whether it is enough support can be found among the tribes. Small numbers of high-ranking officers of American military have served as advisers to the Pakistan Armed Forces in the tribal areas, giving planning advice and helping to integrate American intelligence. Under this new approach, the number of advisers had to increase.

The U.S. Government said these security improvements complemented a package of assistance from the U.S. AID for the seven districts of the tribal areas that amounted to $750 million over five years, and would involve work in education, health and other sectors. The BINLEA of the U.S. Government also assisted the Frontier Corps with financing for counter-narcotics work.

=== Islamabad Marriott Hotel bombing ===
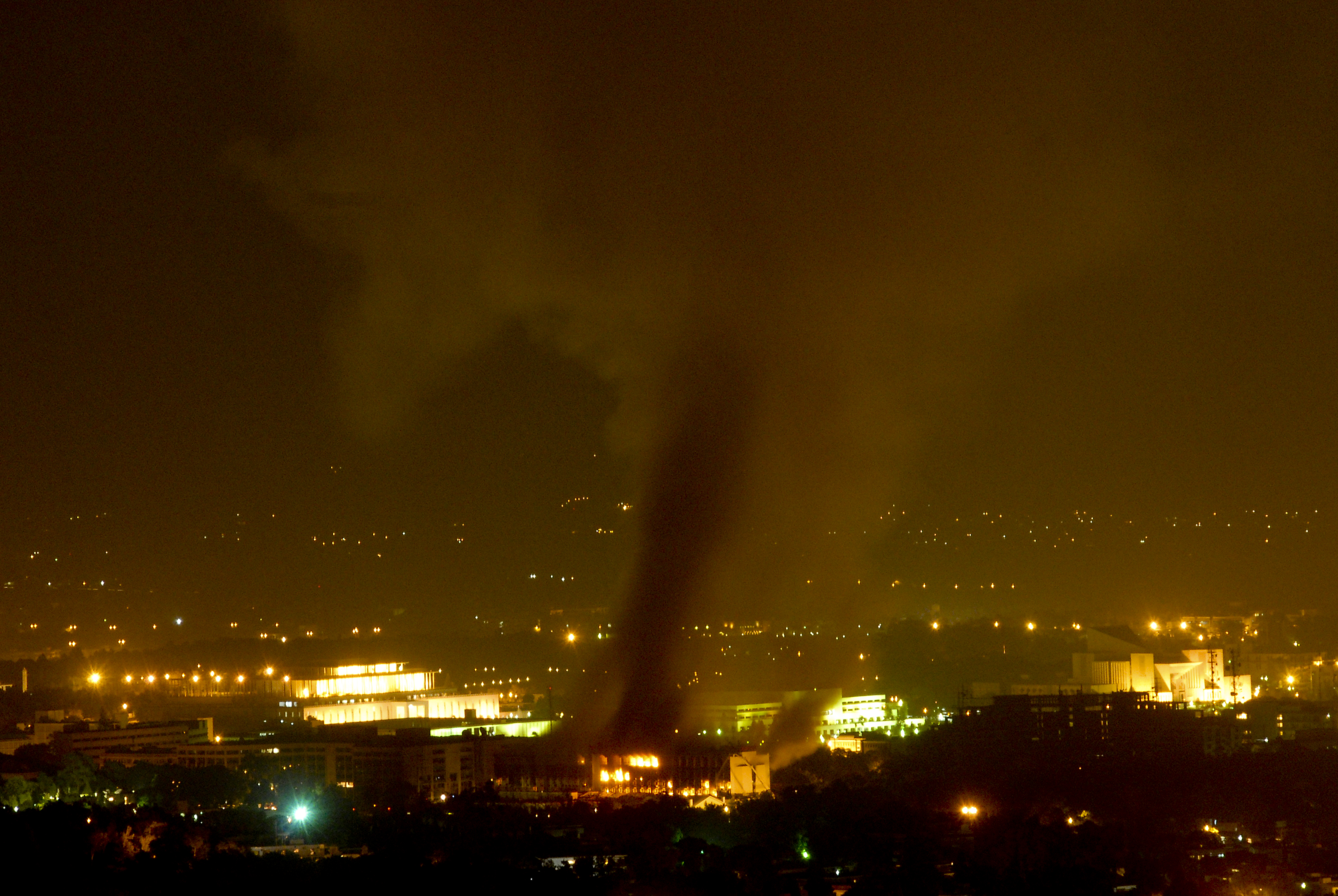
View of the Marriot hotel after the 2008 bombing.

In 2008, Al-Qaeda struck its largest terrorist attack in Islamabad when a truck bomb targeted the Marriott Hotel. This attack was a defining moment in the war; 54 people were killed and around 266 others injured. According to the testimonies, numbers of U.S. Marines and U.S. Navy personnel also died in the attack; many believed the Americans were the target of the terrorist attacks. In a response to attack on 23 September 2008, the PAF launched an aerial bombing mission. Military reports said that more than 60 insurgents were killed in northwest Pakistan. In the nearby Bajur tribal region, the air force strikes killed at least 10 militants, according to government officials. The Bajur operations, which the army said left more than 700 suspected militants dead, won praise from U.S. officials.

=== Renewed Bajaur offensive ===
They [Taliban militants] never see us on the ground. The only time they find out that an aircraft has struck is when the bomb explodes on them. It creates a great psychological impact....

— Chief of Air Staff Air chief marshal Rao Qamar Suleman

In a television emergency address, President Zardari and Prime Minister Gillani publicly vowed revenge in response to the Marriott Hotel bombing. By 26 September 2008, Pakistan air force and army had conducted and completed a major joint offensive in the Bajaur and the Tang Khata regions of the Federally Administered Tribal Areas, codenamed Operation Sherdil. This joint operation had killed over 1,000 militants in a huge offensive, a day after President Asif Ali Zardari lashed out at US forces over a clash on the Afghan border.

Major-General Tariq Khan, now Inspector General of the Frontier Corps, mentioned to journalists that since the beginning of the Bajaur operations, there were up to 2,000 militant fighters including hundreds of foreign fighters who were fighting with the soldiers and the armed forces. The overall death toll was over 1,000 militants and also adding that 27 Pakistani soldiers had also been killed with 111 soldiers seriously wounded.

In this major aerial offense, five of the most wanted Al-Qaeda operatives and Central Asian militant commanders were among those killed in a month-long operation in Bajaur. According to PAF reports, "out of the five militant commanders killed, four appeared to be foreigners: Egyptian abu Saeed Al-Masri; Abu Suleiman, also an Arab; an Uzbek fighter named Mullah Mansoor; and an Afghan commander called Manaras. The fifth was a Pakistani commander named only Abdullah, a son of aging hardline leader Maulvi Faqir Mohammad who is based in Bajaur and has close ties to Al-Qaeda second-in-command Ayman al-Zawahiri.

Between 22 and 24 October, the armed forces engaged in another hard-push against militants in the restive Bajaur and Khyber tribal regions. The army troops did not enter in the region until the PAF conducted its precision bombings. The PAF intense high-altitude air strikes missions were carried out in the Nawagai and Mamond sub-districts of Bajaur Agency. The advancing troops destroyed several centers of militants at Charmang, Chinar and Zorbandar and inflicted heavy losses on them. The army gunship helicopters shelled in Charming, Cheenar, Kohiand Babarha areas of Nawagai and Mamund Tehsil of Bajaur agency, destroying various underground hideouts and bunkers of militants. The armed forces also took control of different areas of Loisam, a militant headquarters, and advanced towards other areas for complete control.

=== Intensified drone strikes and border skirmishes with the United States ===
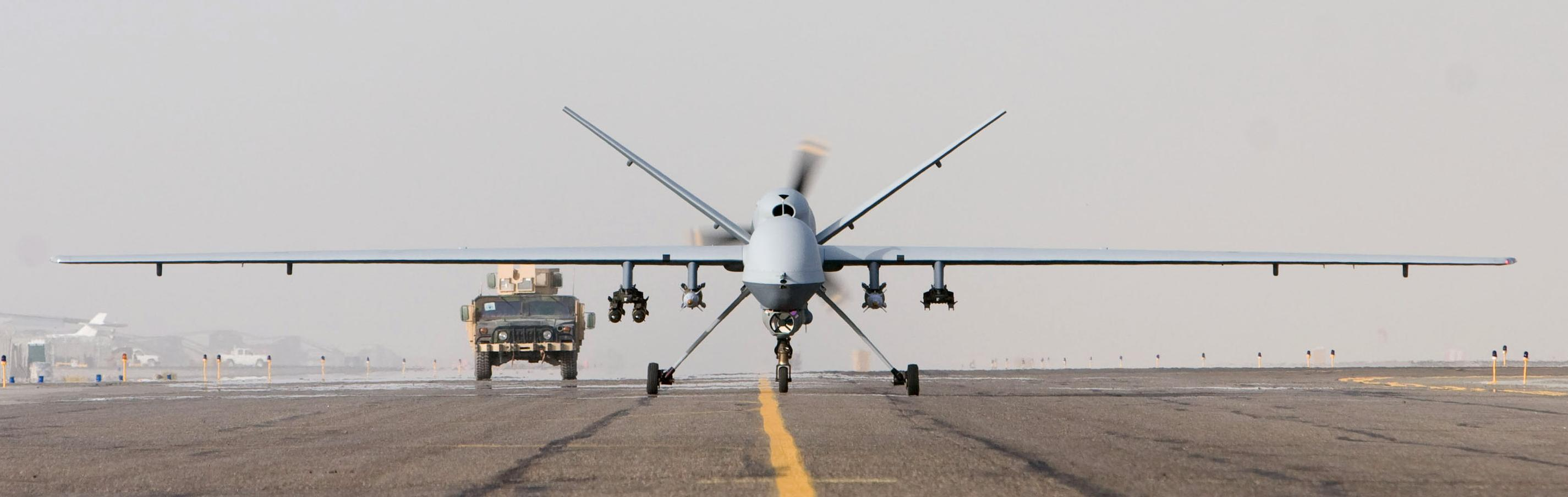
An MQ-9 Reaper taking off in Afghanistan.

At the end of August 2008, the USAF stepped up its air attacks in the Federally Administered Tribal Areas. On 3 September 2008, the United States Army Special Forces teams laid a commando attack in a village near the Afghan border in South Waziristan. Additional airstrikes from unmanned drones in North Waziristan culminating on 8 September 2008, when a United States Air Force drone aircraft fired a number of missiles at a "guest house for militants arriving in North Waziristan." Around ~23 people were killed, but the operation's target, Jalaluddin Haqqani, was not among them.

On 25 September 2008, the Pakistan military and the U.S. military became involved in heavy border fighting on the Frontier border. The incident happened after two US military helicopters came under fire from Pakistan army troops. A U.S. military spokesman insisted that they had been about 2.5 kilometres (1 1/2 miles) inside Afghanistan. Speaking at the United Nations, President Asif Zardari maintained that Pakistan would not tolerate violations of its sovereignty, even by its allies. President Zardari told the United Nations, "Just as we will not let Pakistani's territory to be used by terrorists for attacks against our people and our neighbours, we cannot allow our territory and our sovereignty to be violated by our friends", he said, without specifically citing the United States or the border flareup.

=== Militant targeting of tribes ===
On 10 October 2008, TTP militants beheaded four kidnapped pro-government tribal elders in the Charmang area of Bajaur.

On 11 October 2008, a suicide bomber struck an anti-militant gathering of tribal elders just as they had decided to form a lashkar (tribal militia). At least 110 anti-Taliban tribesmen were killed and a further 125 were wounded. The suicide bomber drove his car into the gathering itself and blew himself up. The attack on the tribal council took place in Orakzai, normally a relatively quiet corner of the nation's chaotic tribal areas.

=== Fighting for NATO supply lines ===
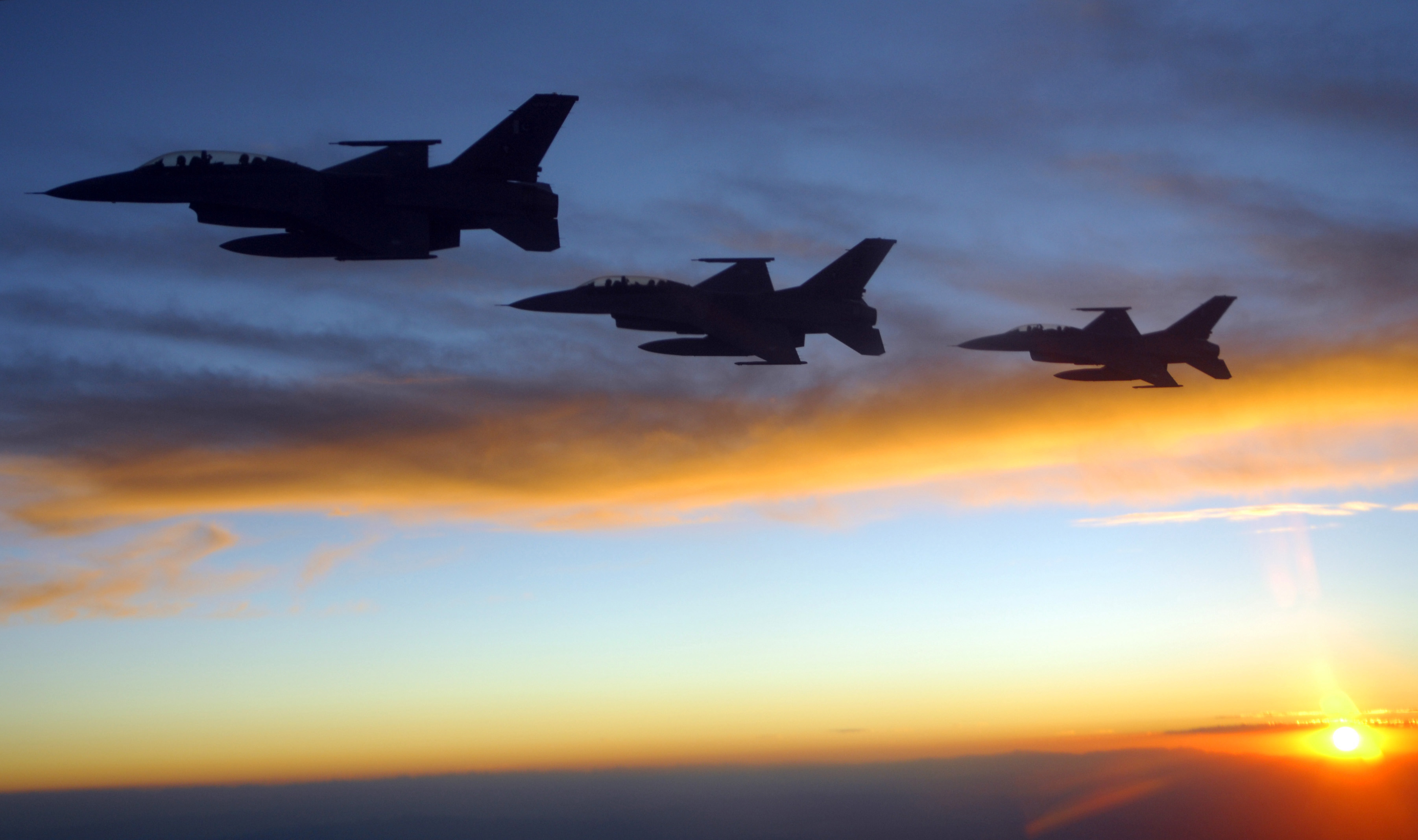
The Pakistan Air Force's F-16s took active participation in the combat aerial bombing missions against the TTP hideouts. Most Pakistan Air Force combat air operations were conducted at night.

On 19 October 2008, the news media began to broadcast the news of Pakistan Army troops, led by an army lieutenant, being locked in a fierce battle with foreign militants to keep open the line routes to NATO forces in Afghanistan. For several months, the foreign militants had been trying to either attack or seal off the supply routes. The army battle reports indicated that the local commander, Mohammad Tariq al-Fridi, had seized terrain around the 1.5-kilometre-long (1 mi) Kohat Tunnel. The military intelligence reports had held al-Fridi responsible for coordinated suicide bomb attacks and rocket strikes against convoys emerging from it. The TTP spokesman, Maulvi Omar, claimed that his foreign fighters would lay down their arms if the Pakistan Army ceased intense fighting. The military refused his offers and a tactical military operation was launched to secure the tunnel routes after TTP seized five trucks carrying weapons and ammunition. They held the tunnel for a week before they were driven out in fierce fighting with the military. Since then, Tariq and his men have returned several times to attack convoys, in a response, the army launched its latest onslaught after a suicide bomb attack at one of its bases near the tunnel six weeks ago. In a massive manhunt operation, Tariq was killed along with hundreds of militants while trying to flee the battle in a combat air operation. The operation ended with five civilians were killed and 45 were injured, including 35 soldiers, when a pickup truck packed with explosives was driven into a checkpoint.

On 11 November 2008, another group of militants attacked two convoys at the Khyber Pass capturing 13 trucks which were headed for Afghanistan. One convoy was from the United Nations World Food Programme and was carrying wheat. The second was intended for NATO troops and one of the captured trucks was carrying with it two U.S. military Humvees, which were also seized.

On 8 December 2008, the militants torched more than 160 vehicles destined for US-led troops in Afghanistan. The militants attacked the Portward Logistic Terminal (PTL) in the northern city of Peshawar at around 2:30 a.m., destroying its gate with a rocket-propelled grenade and shooting dead a guard. They then set fire to about 100 vehicles, including 70 Humvees, which shipping documents showed were being shipped to the U.S.-led coalition forces and the Afghan National Army. At the same time, militants torched about 60 more vehicles at the nearby Faisal depot, which like Portward is on the ring road around Peshawar, where convoys typically stop before heading for the Khyber Pass. On 3 February 2009, the militant group again blew up a bridge at the Khyber Pass, temporarily cutting a major supply line for Western troops in Afghanistan. After the attack supplies along the route had been halted "for the time being", according to NATO.

== Public support and unified military operations ==
=== Swat ceasefire ===
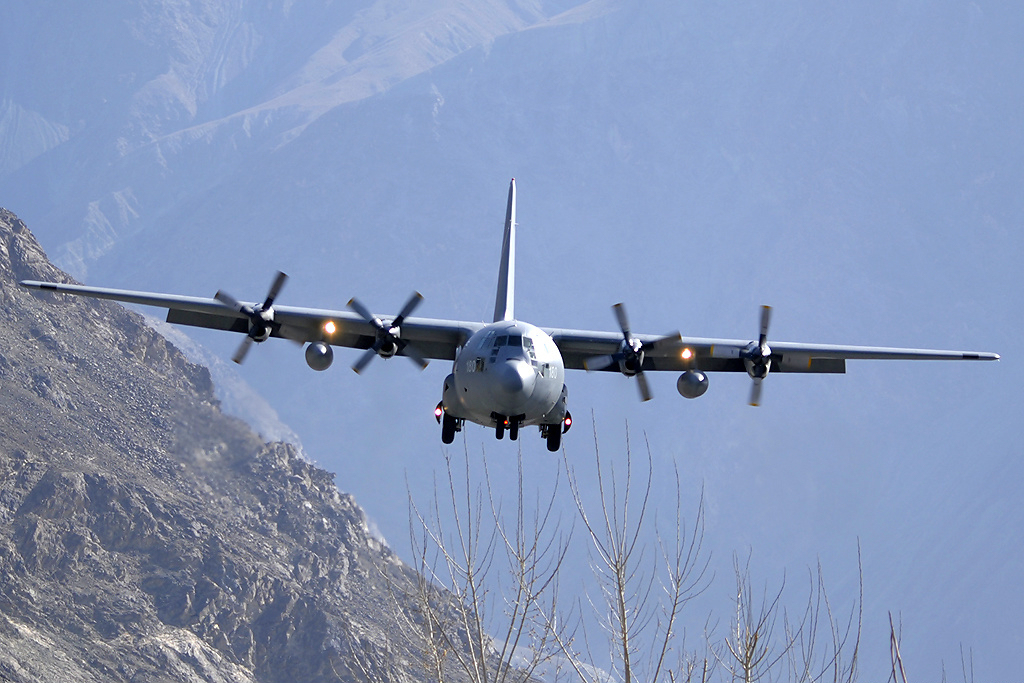
Pakistan's airborne troops performed combat jump operations from Pakistan Air Force's C-130 Hercules aircraft, 2010.

Since 2008–09, the Chairman joint chiefs General Tariq Majid, working with his JS HQ staffers, had been running several meetings of planning to conduct the joint warfare operations against the TTP militants. A new strategy of joint-military operations and studies were conducted under General Majid. During this time, the Government agreed to impose the Sharia ordnance law and temporarily suspended the military suspension in the Swat Valley in Khyber Pakhtunkhwa Province. This decision was troubling for the United States in Afghanistan, which believed that it would embolden militant groups fighting US military–led ISAF in Afghanistan.

The U.S. government also believed it would provide another safe haven for the militants within 130 kilometres (80 mi) of Islamabad, as well as a corridor between the North-Western border with Afghanistan and North–Eastern border with India.

The Pakistan Government officials rationalised that "such agreement was the only way to pacify a fierce insurgency and avoid more civilian casualties in Swat Valley – whose ski resort and mountain scenery once made it a popular tourist destination." The Khyber Pakhtunkhwa's Chief Minister, Amir Hoti, announced that the local authorities would impose Islamic law across Malakand Division, which includes Swat. The Government officials maintained that President Asif Zardari would sign off on the deal once peace had been restored. However, the agreement was never signed by President Zardari soon after the TTP militants violated the treaty.

The agreement came the day after the militants in Swat said that it would observe a ten-day ceasefire in support of the peace process. Pakistani officials say that the laws allow Muslim clerics to advise judges, but not to outlaw female education, music or other activities once banned by the Afghan Taliban in Afghanistan.

=== Defeat of the militants in Bajaur ===
On 1 March 2009, the Pakistan Army troops finally defeated the foreign fighters in Bajaur, which is a strategically important region on the Afghan border. The 40th Army Division commander, Major-General Tariq Khan reported that the army and the Frontier Corps had killed most militants in Bajaur, the smallest of the agencies but a major infiltration route into Afghanistan, after a six-month offensive. By the time the battle in Bajaur was over, the Pakistan Army killed over 1,500 militants while losing 97 of their own soldiers and 404 soldiers seriously injured.

In retaliation on 30 March, the militant groups attacked the Police Academy in Munawan town, killing and taking hostage police cadets. In an operation led by Punjab Police, the units of Elite Police had managed to retake the academy. Lasting about eight hours, the police suspension ended with 18 people killed in the attack, including eight policemen, eight militants and two civilians deaths. At least, ~95 policemen were wounded and four gunmen were captured by the Elite Police.

In a similar attack on 4 April 2009, another suicide bomber attacked a military camp in Islamabad killing eight soldiers; less than 24 hours later, two more suicide attacks occurred. One bomber targeted a market on the border with Afghanistan killing 17 people and the other attacked a mosque in Chakwal, in the Eastern Pakistan province of Punjab, killing 26 more civilians. The next day, the leader of the Tehrik-i-Taliban Pakistan, Baitullah Mehsud, promised that there were to be two suicide attacks per week in the country until the Pakistani army withdrew from the border region and the United States stopped its missile attacks by unmanned drones on militant bases.

=== Militant violation of Swat ceasefire ===
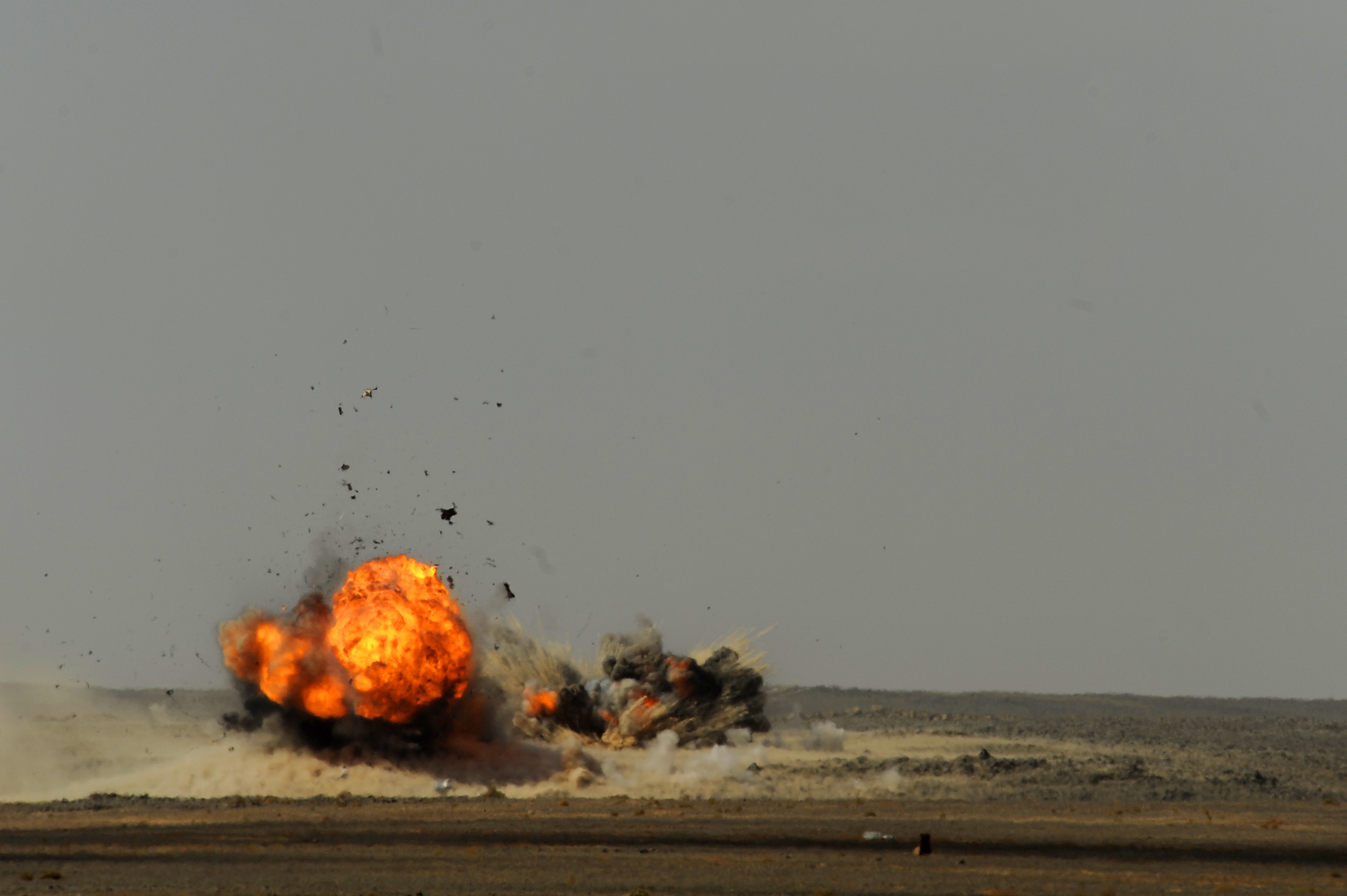
The PAF's precision bombing operations played a crucial role in defeat of the TTP in Swat, 2009

In March 2009, many Pakistanis were horrified when a videotape was broadcast in news channels that showed militant enforcers were publicly whipping a 17-year-old girl in Swat accused of having an affair. The girl had not committed fornication or adultery but was flogged simply because she refused her brother's demand to marry someone of his choosing. Protests against the TTP broke out all over the country to demonstrate against the flogging. Conservative thinker Raja Zafar ul Haq of Pakistan Muslim League, appearing in news channels, maintained that "this summary punishment of flogging simply for refusing a marriage proposal was totally un-Islamic and had nothing to do with Sharia." He went on to say that Muhammad had strictly forbidden the practice of forced marriages and in this case, the girl had not done anything wrong by refusing a marriage proposal.

Sensing the sensitivity of the issue, the Supreme Court of Pakistan appointed a five-member team appointed to investigate the video's origins, and concluded that it had been faked, raising questions at Pakistani intelligence services.

In Buner, the TTP continued their criminal activities when residents said TTP fighters had been stealing cattle for meat, stealing other livestock, berating men without beards and recruiting teenagers into their ranks. The TTP also began to steal vehicles belonging to government officials and ransacked the offices of some local non-government organisations for no apparent reason. 12 schoolchildren were killed by a bomb contained in a football.

=== Operation Black Thunderstorm ===
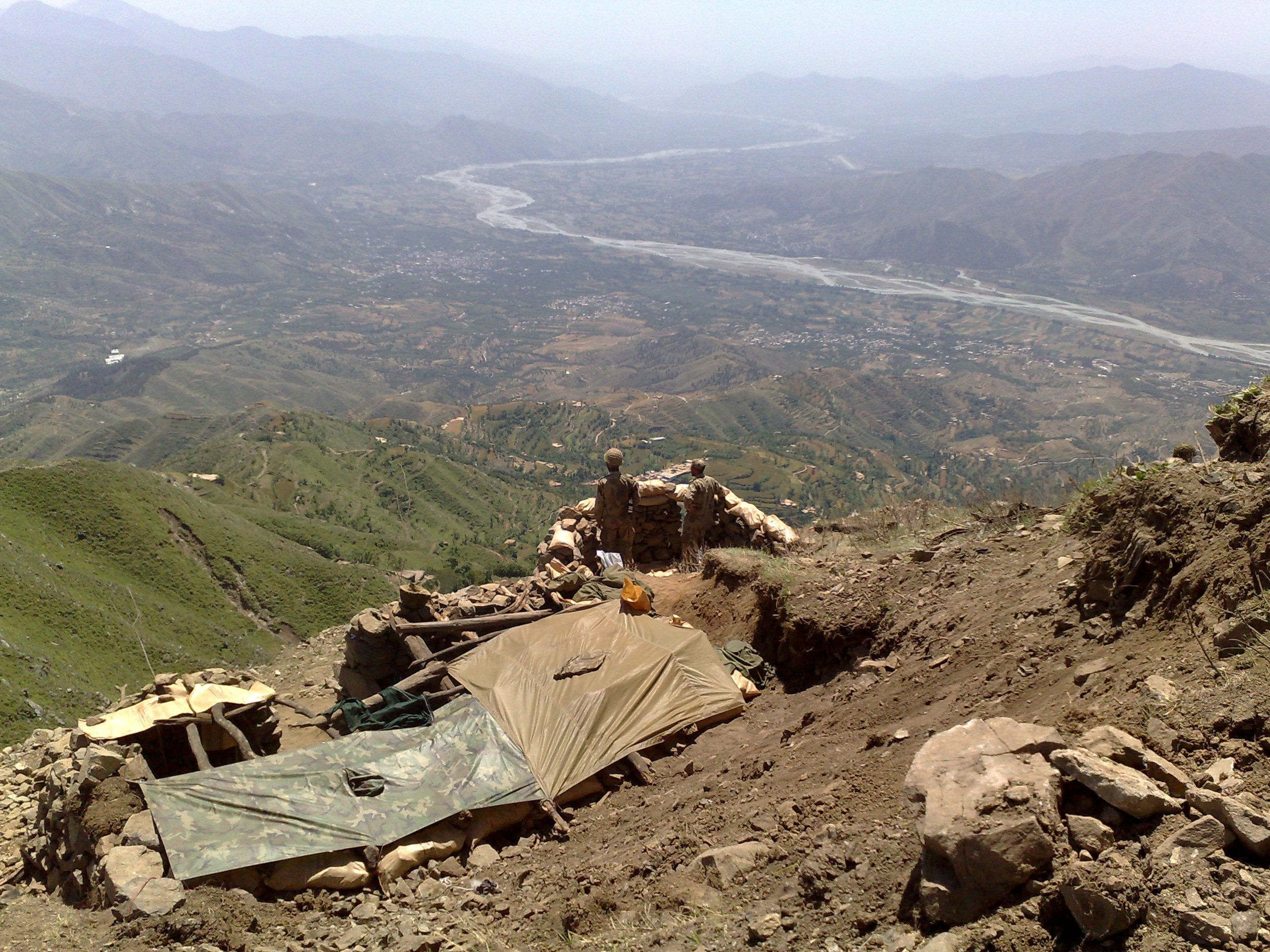
Pakistan airborne forces observing the Swat Valley at its highest point after defeating the Taliban, 2009

On 26 April 2009, the unified Pakistan Armed Forces started the strategic and tactical airborne attack, codename Black Thunderstorm, with the aim of retaking Buner, Lower Dir, Swat and Shangla districts from the TTP. This joint army–navy- air force unified operation was well rehearsed and prepared. The fighter jets of Navy and air force began pounding the militant hideouts while army kept advancing in the militant hideouts. The combat fighter pilots of the navy and air force flew their aerial bombing mission together in high altitude at continuous 24-hour period, to avoid being hit from the anti-aircraft guns. During the initial stages of the unified operations, the ground troops and paratroopers performed combat HALO/HAHO techniques to hold the control of high strategic mountains and hills surrounding the Taliban-controlled cities.

The operation largely cleared the Lower Dir district of militia forces by 28 April and Buner by 5 May 2009. The same day, the ground fighting in Swat was particularly fierce since the TTP threw away their insurgent tactics and the ground forces obtained the counter-insurgency tactics. By 14 May 2009, the military was only six kilometres south of Mingora, the militia-held capital city of Swat, and preparations for all-out street fighting were underway.

On 23 May 2009, the battle for Mingora started and by 27 May, approximately 70% of the city was cleared of militants. On 30 May, the Pakistan military had taken back the city of Mingora from the TTP, calling it a significant victory in its offensive against the militants. However, some sporadic fighting was still continuing on the city's outskirts.

In all, according to the military, 128 soldiers and more than 1,475 militants were killed and 317 soldiers were wounded during operation Black Thunderstorm. Approximately 95 soldiers and policemen were captured by the militants; all were rescued by the military. One hundred and fourteen foreign fighters were captured, including some local commanders. At least 23 of the militants killed were foreigners.

Sporadic fighting throughout Swat continued up until mid-June. On 14 June, the operation was declared over and the military had regained control of the region. Only small pockets of Taliban resistance remained and the military started mopping up operations. This led to a refugee crisis, and by 22 August, 1.6 million of 2.3 million have returned home according to UN estimates.

=== Blockade of South Waziristan ===
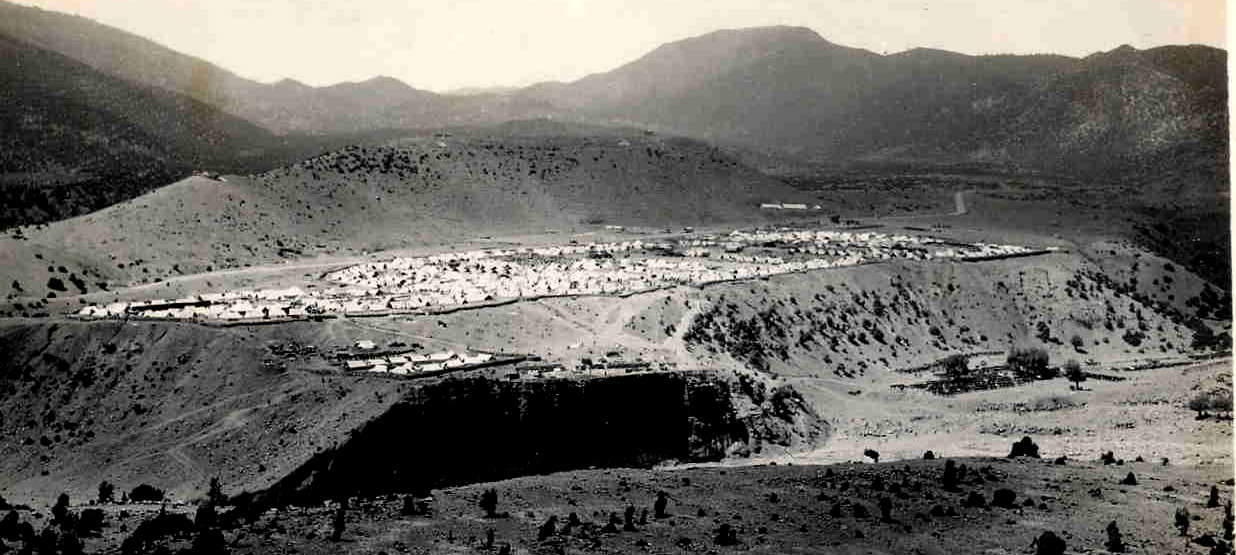
A vintage photo of South Wazristan's mountains, primary hideouts of the TTP before being pushed to Eastern Afghanistan by the military in 2009

In the aftermath of the recapture of the entire Swat valley, the Pakistan military began a massive army troop build-up along the southern and eastern borders of South Waziristan on 16 June 2009,. The military was now taking the fight to Mehsud's mountainous stronghold, ordering an expansion of its current offensive against TTP fighters in the Swat valley. On 17 June 2009, the Governor of Khyber Pakhtunkhwa, Owais Ghani, denounced Baitullah Mehsud as "the root cause of all evils", and quoted that the government has called on the military to launch a "full-fledged" operation to eliminate Mehsud and his estimated 20,000 men.

The Islamabad's decision to launch the offensive against Mehsud signalled a deepening of Pakistani resolve against the militants. The military had targeted the TTP leader on three separate occasions – in 2004, 2005 and 2008 – but walked away each time after signing peace deals with Mehsud. This time, the military also enjoyed the public support as a wave of terrorist attacks had swayed public sentiment against the Taliban.

On 17 October 2009, the military launched another offense, called Operation Rah-e-Nijat when the combat brigades and fighter jets launched a large-scale offensive in South Waziristan involving ~28,000 troops advancing across South Waziristan from three directions. Starting with air force strike and naval intelligence assessment on the TTP, the first town to fall to the military was Kotkai, the birthplace of the TTP leader, Hakimullah Mehsud, on 19 October 2009. However, the next day, the TTP re-took the town. Troops had thrust into Kotkai only to be hit by a determined counteroffensive that killed seven soldiers, including an army major, and wounded seven more. The military managed to take the town once again on 24 October, after days of bombardments.

On 29 October, the town of Kaniguram, which was under the control of Uzbek fighters from the Islamic Movement of Uzbekistan, was surrounded. And on 2 November, Kaniguram was taken.

On 1 November 2009, the towns of Sararogha and Makin were surrounded, and fighting for Sararogha started on 3 November. The fighting there lasted until 17 November, when the town finally fell to the military. The same day, the town of Laddah was also captured by the military and street fighting commenced in Makin. Both Sararogha and Laddah were devastated in the fighting.

By 21 November 2009, ISPR reports showed that more than 570 foreign fighters and 76 soldiers had been killed in the offensive.

On 12 December 2009, the Pakistan military declared victory in South Waziristan.

=== Death of Baitullah Mehsud and TTP counter-attacks ===
As early as August 2009, the TTP leader, Baitullah Mehsud, was killed in a drone attack. This was later confirmed by captured chief spokesman Maulvi Umar. He was replaced by Hakimullah Mehsud.

In early October 2009, the TTP started a string of bomb attacks in cities across Pakistan. The goal of the attacks was to show that the TTP militants were still a united fighting force following the death of their leader and to disrupt a planned military offensive into South Waziristan. Places targeted include the U.N. World Food Programme offices in Islamabad a food store in Peshawar; military headquarters in Rawalpindi; a market in Shangla; the intelligence establishments in Lahore; the police stations in Kohat and Peshawar; the Islamic center at the International Islamic University in Islamabad; and Air Science Laboratories (ASL) Complex in Kamra. November ended with a car bombing of Meena Bazaar, Peshawar killing 118 civilians. Additionally, November saw suicide bombings of the National Bank of Pakistan in Rawalpindi, a market in Charsadda, and six bombings in Peshawar including the regional headquarters of the ISI and the Judicial Complex. In 2013, the media reported that the mastermind of chain of attacks in 2009, Abdullah Umar, was brutalised and killed in a police encounter with Punjab Police in 2013. Media authorities identified Abdullah Umar as a law student of the International Islamic University and a son of army colonel.

== Military offensive (2010–2017) ==
=== Insurgency in West and defeat of Taliban: 2010–11 ===
In an offensive in Bajaur by Frontier Corps, a militants' stronghold village Damadola was captured and cleared by 6 February 2010. Bajaur was declared conflict free zone by 20 April.

On 23 March 2010, the Pakistan armed forces launched an offensive to clear Orakzai. Officials also announced a future offensive in North Waziristan. The week prior the Pakistan military killed approximately 150 militants in fighting in the region. It was expected that all tribal areas would be cleared by June 2010.

On 3 June, Pakistani authorities announced a victory over the insurgents in Orakzai and Kurram.

=== Death of Bin Laden and Navy offensive ===
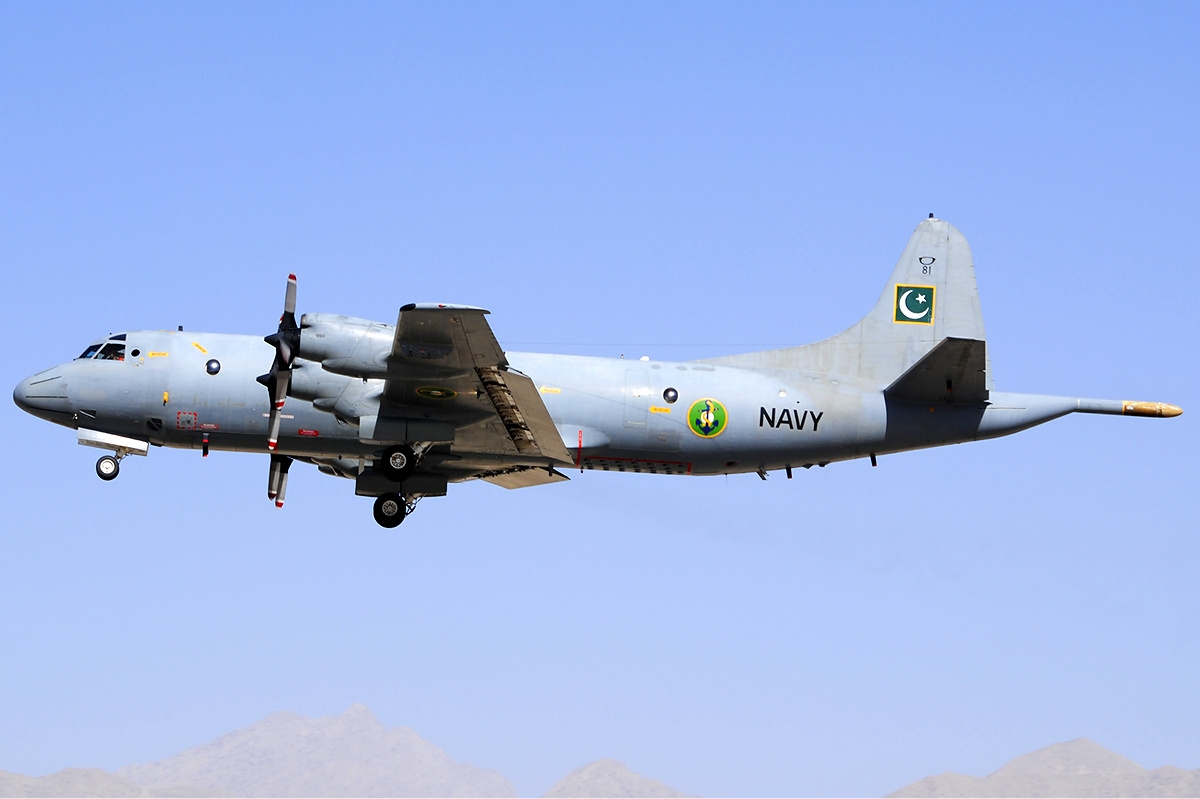
The Navy P-3C played significant role in managing signal intelligence operations against Taliban in the Waziristan war. Two of the nine aircraft were destroyed during the PNS Mehran attack.

As late as 2010, chief of naval staff Admiral Noman Bashir had coordinated many tactical ground operations against TTP hideouts, to support the army and air force pressure on militants. Many operations were executed by the navy, and its operational capability gained international prominence. By 2011, Pakistan's armed forces were stretched thin by natural disasters and deployments against extremist groups, with one third of the army deployed for the fight, another third along the Indian border and the rest engaged in preparing to deploy. On 1 May 2011, in a clandestine operation in Abbottabad, Al-Qaeda leader Osama bin Laden was located and killed by the U.S. Navy SEALs in his private compound. The groups affiliated with the armed TTP vowed, via media, to avenge Osama's death upon the Pakistan Armed Forces.

On 21 and 28 April, senior Al-Qaeda operative Ilyas Kashmiri conducted a series of coordinated terrorist attacks on the Pakistan Navy presence in Northern and Southern contingents. This included attacks on high naval officials of the Pakistan Navy in Karachi, first attacking their bus near the Navy bases. Finally on 22 May, TTP attacked the Mehran Naval Base, killing up to 10 naval officers, wounding 30 others, and destroying two naval reconnaissance aircraft, during the attack. In response, the navy's SSG(N) launched its largest offensive efforts since the 1971 operations, and managed to control and secure the base after a massive shootout. Operationally resulting in tactical success, the navy's counter offensive killed all the militants and ring leaders behind these operations. Kashmiri was widely suspected in the Mehran operation. On 4 June 2011, Ilyas Kashmiri was killed by a U.S. drone strike in South Waziristan.

In 2012, the north-west region of Pakistan experienced periodic bombings perpetrated by insurgents, resulting in thousands of deaths. On 22 December 2012, a suicide bomb attack carried out by the Pakistani Taliban killed Bashir Ahmed Bilour, a minister of Khyber Pakhtunkhwa, as well as 8 other people.

=== Tirah Valley clashes ===
In January 2013, at least 80 militants and civilians were killed in clashes between the Tehrik-e-Taliban / Lashkar-e-Islam and Ansar ul-Islam (a pro-government militant group) in Tirah Valley of Pakistan's Khyber Agency. Fighting between Ansar ul-Islam and the Pakistani Taliban continued till March and as a result, almost the entire Tirah Valley came under the control of Lashkar-e-Islam and TTP fighters. Over 250 militants and civilians were killed and 400 others wounded in the three-month-long clashes. The fighting also displaced about 200,000 to 300,000 people. This forced the Pakistan Army to start Operation Rah-e-Shahadat in order to root out insurgents and extremists from the strategically important region and restore peace and stability for the upcoming May elections.

=== Operation Rah-e-Shahadat ===
Operation: Rah-e-Shahadat-(English: Path to Martyrdom; Urdu:راه شهادث), was the codename of a joint military operation that was commenced on 5 April 2013 by the Pakistan Army, with assistance provided by the PAF and Navy for air support. In close coordination with Local Peace Committee (Aman Lashkar), the army troops and special operations forces, aided by Frontier Corps, to flush out TTP and LeI militants from the Tirah Valley of the Khyber Agency. At least four Pakistani soldiers and 14 insurgents were killed while 5 soldiers were also wounded. In a major aerial operation, the Pakistan Air Force and navy fighter jets pounded hideouts of banned group LeI in and according to military intelligence reports, many militants escaped from the areas taking with them their injured fighters.

On 7 April 2013, Pakistani military officials said that at least 30 Taliban-linked militants and 23 soldiers including commandos were killed during clashes in the Tirah Valley since 5 April. Several Aman Lashkar members were also reported to be killed and wounded. Scores of insurgents and Pakistani troops were injured in the operation.

On 8 April 2013, Pakistani military officials said that at least 30 Pakistani soldiers and 97 militants were killed during fierce fighting with Taliban linked-fighters in the Tirah Valley since 5 April, the day when the operation began.

On 9 April 2013, the ISPR confirmed that at least 23 soldiers and 110 insurgents were killed in the four-day fighting in the Tirah Valley of Khyber Agency.

On 11 April 2013, at least 15 militants and one Pakistani soldier were killed during fighting in southern sector of Tirah Valley. The areas of Mada Khel and Tut Sar were cleared from militants.

On 12 April 2013, nine Pakistani soldiers and seven insurgents were killed during clashes in Sipah area of Tirah Valley. The security forces took control of the areas of Sandana and Sheikhmal Khel in Sipah area. Three Lashkar-e-Islam militants were also arrested while a dozen others were injured. Two peace committee members were killed and 22 others were injured in a bomb blast in the same area.

On 13 April 2013, Pakistan Army's ISPR said that seven militants were killed in the Tirah Valley on 12 April. It did not confirm the casualties suffered by the security forces.

On 16 April 2013, a member of Zakhakhel peace committee (Tawheedul-ul-Islam) was killed in a bomb blast in Dari area of Tirah Valley.

On 2 May 2013, four Taliban-linked insurgents were killed and five others wounded after Pakistani fighter jets targeted TTP hideouts in the Tirah Valley.

On 5 May 2013, Pakistan Army's ISPR said that 16 insurgents and two soldiers were killed during heavy clashes in the Tirah Valley. Three soldiers were reported to be wounded. The military also claimed to have captured militant strongholds Kismat Sur and Sanghar and recovered huge cache of arms and ammunition from the militants fleeing the area.

=== Disengagement of militant groups ===
News reports and intelligence media news began airing the news that the TTP and other Central Asian militant groups, notably the IMU, have now set up camps and reinforced hundreds of fighters to Syria to fight alongside rebels opposed to Bashar al-Assad in continuity of cementation of ties with al Qaeda, starting of July 2013. According to Reuters, hundreds of fighters had gone to Syria to fight alongside their "Mujahedeen friends". Media reported the visit and setup of a TTP base in Syria to assess "the needs of the jihad". At least 12 experts in information technology and warfare were sent to Syria in the last two months to aid the Mujahideen. The Pakistani government has not commented on the allegations.

=== North Waziristan offensive ===
On 19 December 2013, the army launched a major offensive in the Mir Ali region of North Waziristan following a suicide bomb attack on a checkpoint in the area the previous day. Artillery and helicopter gunships were used in the operation. By 23 December, more than 30 militants and up to 70 civilians allegedly were killed.

=== Tehreek-e-Taliban Pakistan infighting ===
In March 2014 rival factions fought for control of Tehreek-e-Taliban Pakistan. Commander Khan Said Sajna and followers of the late TTP leader Hakimullah Mehsud now under command of Maulana Fazlullah clashed in Shaktoi area of South Waziristan and later in the same area in early April 2014. This began a bloody struggle for control of the organisation. After several minor skirmishes another major attack took place in the Shawal area of the troubled North Waziristan district on 6 May 2014.

=== Operation Zarb-e-Azb ===
Military situation in Pakistan in June 2014, prior to Operation Zarb-e-Azb Under control of the Government and Allies Taliban, Al-Qaeda and Allies influence

In response to the IMU's Jinnah Airport attack on 8 June 2014, the Pakistani military launched an operation on 15 June 2014 against the militants in North Waziristan including the Tehrik-i-Taliban Pakistan (TTP), Al-Qaeda, East Turkestan Islamic Movement (ETIM), the Islamic Movement of Uzbekistan (IMU) and the Haqqani network. Up to 30,000 soldiers were involved in the operation. It had been described as a "comprehensive operation" that aimed to flush out foreign and local militants hiding in North Waziristan.

In 2014, the Pakistan Army's Special Service Group had a manhunt operation after targeting and killing the Saudi citizen, Adnan Gulshair, who was the Global Operations Chief of Al-Qaeda.

By 2014, casualty rates in the country as a whole dropped by 40% as compared to 2011–13, with even greater drops noted in Khyber Pakhtunkhwa, despite the province being the site of a large massacre of school children by Tehrik-i-Taliban terrorists in December 2014.

By December 2015, some 3,400 Pakistani Taliban and their allied fighters were killed during the first 18 months of the operation, according to the ISPR. By June 2016, a total of 3,500 militants were killed, including 900 terrorists belonging to Lashkar-e-Islam, according to the Director General ISPR. Four hundred and ninety soldiers were also killed in the two-year operation. A kinetic military action was conducted and Shawal valley was cleared of militants.

On 21 May 2016, the Emir of Taliban Akhtar Mansour was killed in a US drone strike near Ahmad Wal town in Balochistan, which is roughly 35 kilometres (22 mi) from Afghan airspace.

== Continued insurgency ==
After Zarb-e-Azb militants were deprived of any territorial space and were scattered across length and breadth of the country in the form of sleeper cells. Despite substantial reduction in terrorism, sleeper cells continued to pose threat to Pakistan's security. The TTP and its affiliate Jamaat-ul-Ahrar launched Operation Ghazi to punish Pakistan of its military campaigns in the North-West. Pakistan Army responding to TTP's Operation Ghazi, launched Operation Radd-ul-Fasaad.

As of 2025, rise in TTP's activity threatened Pakistan’s attempts to position itself as a military powerhouse in South Asia. TTP has increasingly focused on direct attacks against security forces while largely sparing civilians, reducing the likelihood of local backlash. Despite the use of drone strikes and targeted operations, Pakistan’s military has suffered significant personnel losses, and the continued presence of Islamic State fighters in the region has further strained its control. According to Asfandyar Mir, a senior fellow at the Stimson Center, the TTP has been able to assert itself to the extent that the balance of power is beginning to shift against Pakistan’s security forces, raising concerns over the state’s ability to maintain authority and regional military influence.

In October 2025, KP Chief Minister Sohail Afridi blamed the federal government for the resurgence of militancy in the province, citing its flawed policies and failure to release essential war-on-terror funds and constitutional dues.

Between 2021 and 2025, the latter saw most activity with about 3,811 incidents. These accounted for 71% incidents across Pakistan. KP saw 16 suicide bombings in 2025. DG-ISPR Ahmed Sharif Chaudhry blamed "politically permissive environment" and PTI leaders Imran Khan and Sohail Afridi over the surge. About 8,500 TTP fighters were active by the end of the year according to Iftikhar Firdous, co-founder of Khorasan Diary research outlet. The year was also the deadliest in a decade since 2015 on account of increased violence and Pakistan's worsened ties with Taliban ruled Afghanistan.

=== Operation Radd-ul-Fasaad ===
In 2017, the insurgency slowed from a war to a low-intensity conflict, but high-death toll attacks continued, including a suicide bombing in Sehwan, Sindh, on 16 February which killed over 90 people. On 22 February, the Pakistan Army launched Operation Radd-ul-Fasaad which is aimed at eliminating terrorism and consolidating the gains of Zarb-e-Azb. The operation was initiated in response to militant Jamaat-ul-Ahrar's Operation Ghazi that saw several IED and suicide attacks across Pakistan during the same month. Islamist attacks against government and civilian targets continued, including a bombing at a market in Parachinar on 23 June 2017 which killed over 70 people and a suicide bombing in a mosque in Peshawar on 4 March 2022 which killed over 60 people.

Unlike previous military campaigns Radd-ul-Fasaad was not specific to a specific conflict zone but included Intelligence-Based Operations against sleeper cells, facilitators, abettors and militants scattered across length and breadth of the country. After 2016, the Pakistan Armed Forces largely squeezed territorial space on the militants which denied them space to operate freely in Pakistan. The strict vigilance by Pakistan Military forced them to operate in urban areas in the form of sleeper cells while taking scattered sanctuaries in the mountainous terrain of western provinces of Pakistan. The leadership of TTP fled across Afghanistan and established its base in the Eastern Afghanistan bordering with Pakistan from where it continued to launch cross border raids on Afghanistan-Pakistan border areas.

Radd-ul-Fasaad vowed to tackle cross border militancy, purge sleeper cells in Urban Pakistan, flush of remnants militants escaped across country, and pursuit National Action Plan. The operation entailed the conduct of Broad Spectrum Security (Counter Terrorism) operations by Rangers in Punjab and Sindh, and by Frontier Corps in Balochistan and Khyber Pakhtunkhwa and focus on more effective border security management. Countrywide disarmament and explosive control were also given as additional objectives of the operation. The National Action Plan was pursued as the hallmark of this operation.

As a result of Operation Radd-ul-Fasaad, TTP suffered huge losses and divided into various splinter groups that weakened its operational capabilities. According to Delhi-based South Asian Terrorism Portal (SATP) 2019 was the most peaceful year for Pakistan since the start of the insurgency in 2004. According to SATP, The suicide attacks in Pakistan in 2019 dropped to 8 from a record high of 85 in 2009. By 2021, More than 375,000 operations have been carried out against terrorists, including over 150,000 in Sindh, 3,4000 in Punjab, more than 80,000 in Balochistan and over 92,000 in Khyber Pakhtunkhwa.

Operation was a tactical victory for Pakistan as country saw consolidation of gains of Operation Zarb-e-Azb by further denting the terrorist capability to carry out activities against Pakistan which was visible in drastic drop in suicide and IED attacks. It has been deemed a strategic failure because it did not achieve the objectives of National Action Plan. The country did not foster durable peace, specially after Taliban's takeover of Afghanistan in August 2021. The political change in Afghanistan triggered new wave of terrorism in Pakistan. Since 2022 Pakistan has seen a visible uptick in terrorism-related incidents.

=== Afghanistan–Pakistan border barrier ===
To consolidate gains of military campaigns from 2002 to 2017, Pakistani military leadership started constructing a fence along the 2,611-kilometre (1,622 mi) border with Afghanistan in 2017 to prevent cross-border militant attacks. By August 2021, 90% of the border barrier between the two countries—consisting of four-metre-high (13 ft) chain-link double fences separated by a two-metre (6.6 ft) space filled with concertina wire coils—was completed.

=== 2023 Kurram Parachinar conflict ===
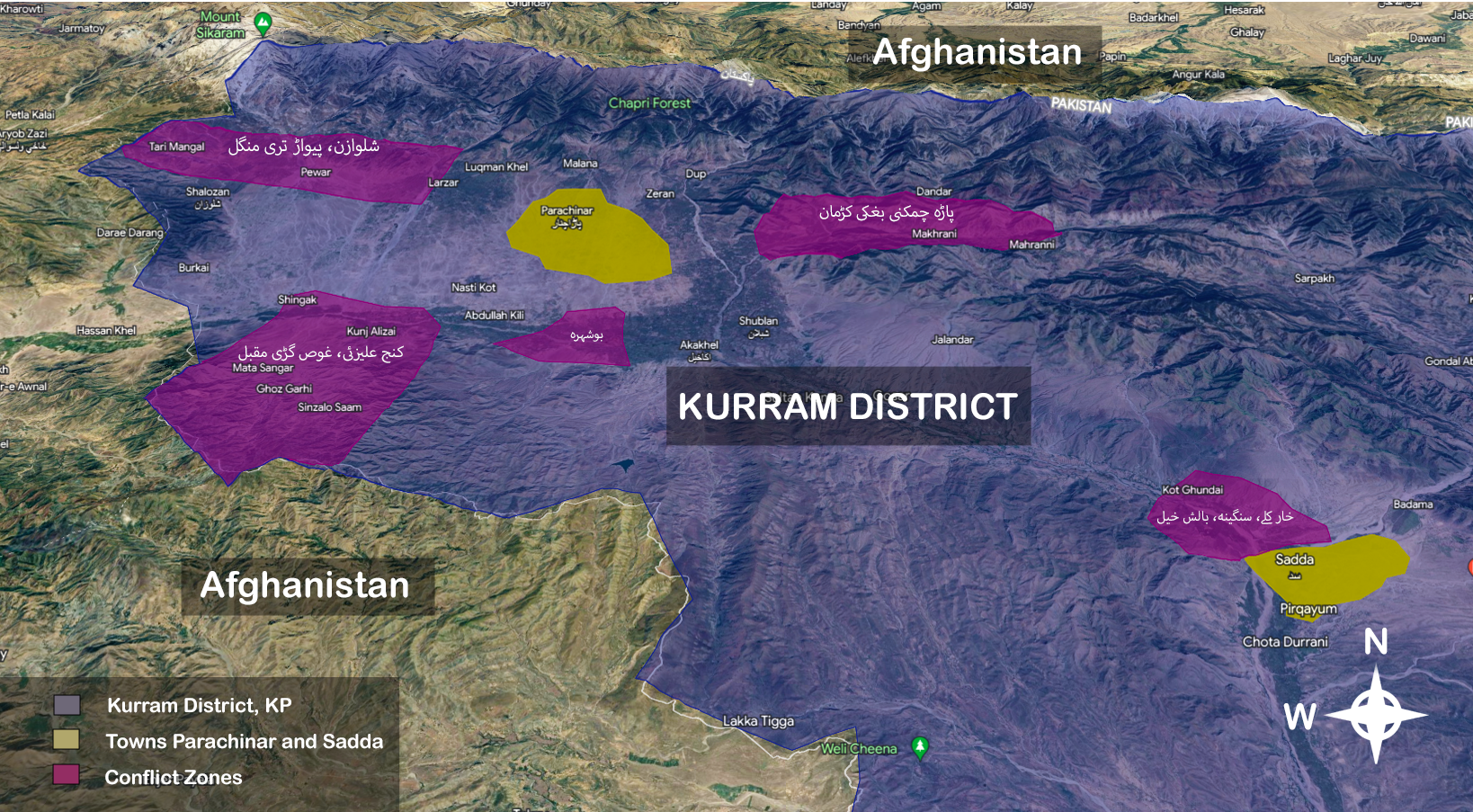
Map of 2023 Kurram District Conflict Zones

In May 2023, the 2023 Kurram Parachinar secretarian conflict broke on between local Sunni fighters, of Turi, and Bangash Shia Fighters in the Kurram District. After escalation in the conflict, the Government of Pakistan responding to the request of the Government of Khyber-Pakhtunkhwa for intervention by the armed forces, deployed Frontier Corps troops to the area to restore order. After deployment, all fighting in the area came to an end on July 13, 2023. The normalcy in region returned within days after the dialogue conducted by the Jirga with mediation from the officials of the paramilitary force and civil administration. The Pashtun Maliks (chieftains) of Turi and Bangash tribes, with aid of government led to a dialogue between two communities that bridged the gulf between two sects.

=== Operation Azm-e-Istehkam ===
==== Background ====
Operation Radd-ul-Fasaad was a counter-terrorist operation. It did not address roots of insurgency embedded in extremism. Pakistan's National Action Plan 2014 had strongly called for complementing counter-terrorism with counter-extremism measures to uproot insurgency in North-West Pakistan. Contrary to National Action Plan, Pakistan saw slow implementation on the National Action Plan since 2019 specially on its primary aim of combating extremism under Operation Radd-ul-Fasaad. Resultantly since fall of Kabul in August 2021, Pakistan is confronted with renewed threat of terrorism as TTP has been injected with fresh dose of strength due to the victory of Taliban in Afghanistan. The fresh recruits, easy access to US made weapons, and a sanctuary under the shadow of Afghan Taliban have once again bolstered the TTP to target Pakistan. In 2023, Pakistan saw an increase in terror incidents, especially in Balochistan and Khyber Pakhtunkhwa after the banned militant group Tehreek-i-Taliban Pakistan terminated its ceasefire with the government in November 2022.

==== Approval and Launch ====
On 7 April 2023, Pakistan's National Security Committee under leadership of Prime Minister Shehbaz Sharif decided to launch a new military operation to root out militants posing threats to its western regions. The meeting was also attended by the Pakistan's new military leadership COAS Asim Munir and CJCSC Sahir Shamshad Mirza.

After over a year on 22 June 2024, Pakistan's Apex Committee on National Action Plan approved a new operation that is meant to address slow implementation of National Action Plan specially by addressing its vow of healing extremism across Pakistan. The aim of operation said to eradicate extremism and terrorism in a comprehensive and decisive manner. The operation will not only include military action, but socio-economic uplift to deter extremism.

Pakistan Prime Minister Shehbaz Sharif clarified on 25 June 2024 that "Operation would not be large scale operation.Sharif said Operation Azm-e-Istehkam is being “misunderstood” and compared to previous military operations such as Operation Zarb-e-Azb and Operation Rah-e-Nijat. He said militants in these operations were killed for creating “no-go areas” in the country and for challenging the writ of the state, adding that they caused massive displacement of the population. There are currently no such no-go areas in the country as the ability of terrorist organisations to carry out large-scale organised operations inside Pakistan has been decisively defeated by past armed operations. Therefore, no large-scale military operation which would require population displacement is being contemplated.Its objective is to instill a new spirit and drive in the ongoing implementation of the revised National Action Plan, which was launched after a national consensus in the political arena. Operation Azm-e-Istekam is a multi-domain, multi-agency and national vision to bring about sustainable peace and stability in the country.

Pakistan's Defence Minister Khawaja Asif on 28 June 2024 added that Pakistan may carry out cross border strikes inside Afghanistan on terrorist bases enjoying safe havens on Afghan soil.

=== Operation Sarbakaf ===
Operation Sarbakaf was launched on 29 July 2025 in Bajaur District, Khyber Pakhtunkhwa. The operation began in Loi Mamund tehsil, supported by gunship helicopters and artillery, alongside a three-day curfew in 16 villages. Authorities aimed to eliminate militant hideouts amid a resurgence of Tehrik-i-Taliban Pakistan (TTP) activity. A curfew was later extended from 11 to 14 August in 27 areas of Mamund Tehsil. On 29 July 2025, authorities imposed a daily curfew in 16 areas of Lowi Mamund tehsil under Section 144. The next morning, on 30 July, security forces launched Operation Sarbakaf, supported by helicopters and artillery.

There have been reports of civilian casualties during the operations, including a 13 August mortar strike in Mamund that killed a woman and her two children, and a 22 September airstrike in Tirah Valley in which at least 30 civilians, including women and children, were killed. In June 2025, Amnesty International raised concern over rising drone strikes in Khyber Pakhtunkhwa, criticising Pakistani authorities for failing to protect civilians.

== Peace prospects and developments ==
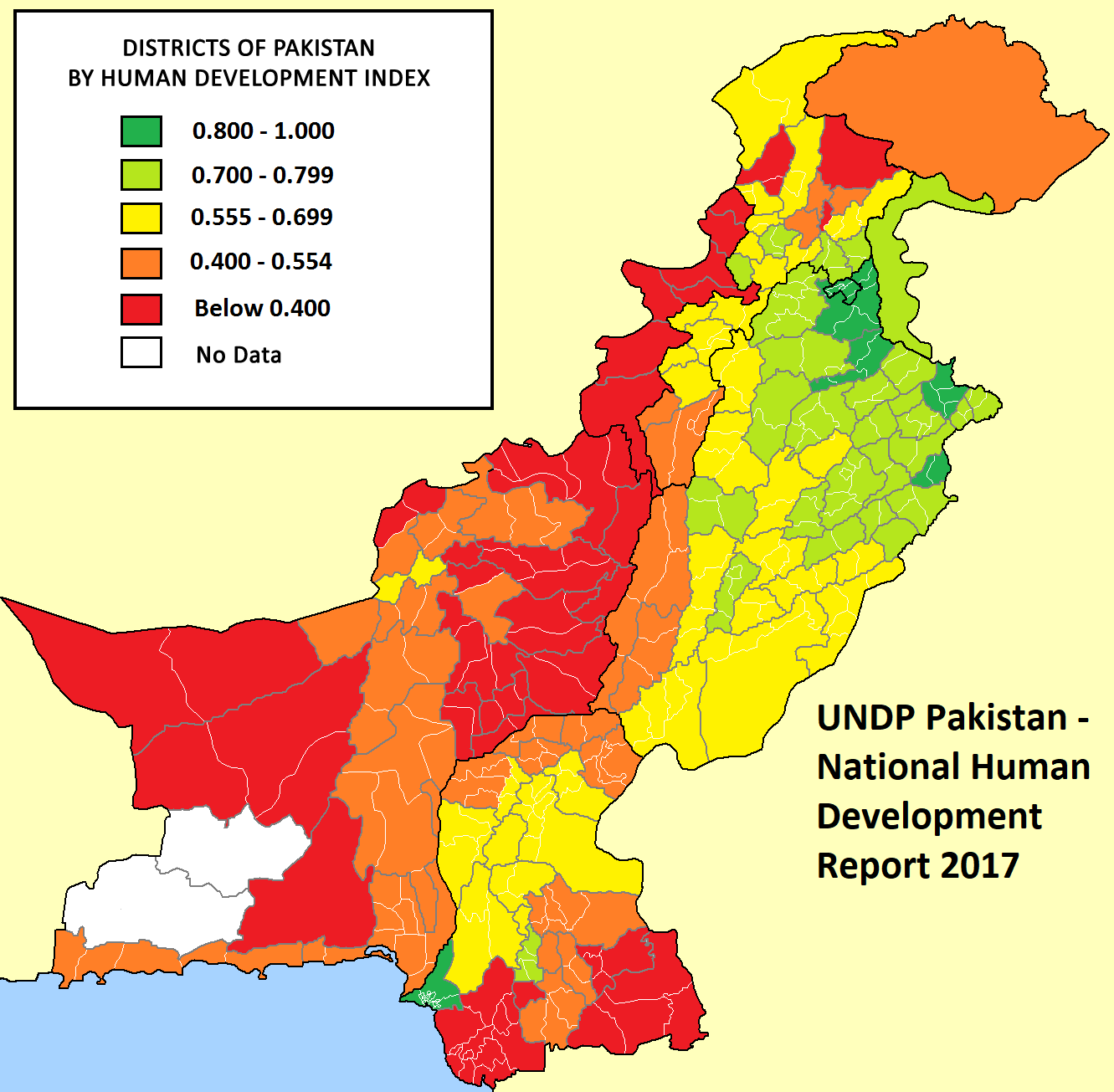
The HDI index of Pakistan, showing the major disparity in economic development in the country.

Since 2006, major initiatives have been taken out by the government to reconstruct and rehabilitate the war-torn areas of FATA and Khyber Pakhtunkhwa. The military administrator of the National Disaster Management Authority (NDMA), Lieutenant-General Nadeem Ahmad, supervised majority of the socioeconomic development in the areas that were badly affected by the military operations. The government took many initiatives, including the promotion of political activities under the Political Parties Act, the construction of the Peshawar-Torkham Road and the establishment of the Investment Bank of FATA, envisioned to bring prosperity and provide employment opportunities. Around 1 billion Pakistani rupees (PKR) were spent for the rehabilitation of the IDPs and 500 million PKR were immediately transferred into the account of the Khyber Pakhtunkhwa government for the economic development in the province.

Since 2006, there are numbers of notable and major international agencies and UN efforts to reconstruct the war-torn areas affected of fighting. As early as 2005, major government institutions were involved at the public level to lead the reconstruction, economic development and to bring quick economic recovery in the war-torn areas, as listed below:

- US Aid
- National Reconstruction Bureau (NRB)
- National Disaster Management Authority (NDMA)
- Earthquake Reconstruction and Rehabilitation Authority (ERRA)
- Special Support Group for IDPs (SSG)
- Federal Relief Commission (FRC)
- National Logistics Cell (NLC)
- Frontier Works Organisation (FWO)
- Navy Reconstruction Group (NRG)

Under the 2006–15 program, a nine-year project, over $2.06 billion would be spend for the economic reconstruction of the FATA region, with the U.S. Government has pledged to provide $750 million over a period of 5 years. Since 2010, the engineering units of army, the Frontier Works Organisation (FWO) and Corps of Engineers and Military Engineering Service, have been active in the area to reconstruct the war-torn areas. Major operations were carried out by the FWO to complete the wide canvas of works, including construction of over 400 km roads, dams, canals and hydroelectric works. The engineering units commenced the work on Gomal Zam Dam in Waziristan with the help of the local tribal people who were employed for this mega project. The Pakistan Army started the political and educational activities after rebuilding the damaged schools and colleges in Waziristan and gave admissions to as many as young tribal teenagers and young men and women in the army institutions since August 2011.

=== Khyber-Pakhtunkhwa-FATA Merger ===
Since the independence of Pakistan from the United Kingdom in 1947, the seven districts of the Federally Administered Tribal Areas (FATA) were governed by political officers appointed by the President of Pakistan. The PA had near absolute power over their tribal districts. However, Twenty-fifth Amendment to the Constitution of Pakistan merged FATA with Khyber-Pakhtunkhwa, turning seven agencies of FATA into the seven districts. The amendment replaced colonial era Frontier Crimes Regulation with the FATA Interim Governance Regulation, 2018, effectively enforcing Constitution of Pakistan on the territories of the erstwhile FATA.

Twenty-fifth Amendment has proven to be a game changer in the Insurgency of Khyber-Pakhtunkhwa as the area which were acting as fortress for the insurgency has been fallen under the local administration of Khyber-Pakhtunkhwa. The provincial and federal departments have established their presence and started to consolidate control of Pakistan over these areas which were out of Pakistani jurisdiction. Around 37,428 policemen were recruited and deployed in tribal districts after training to maintain law and order.

== Casualties ==
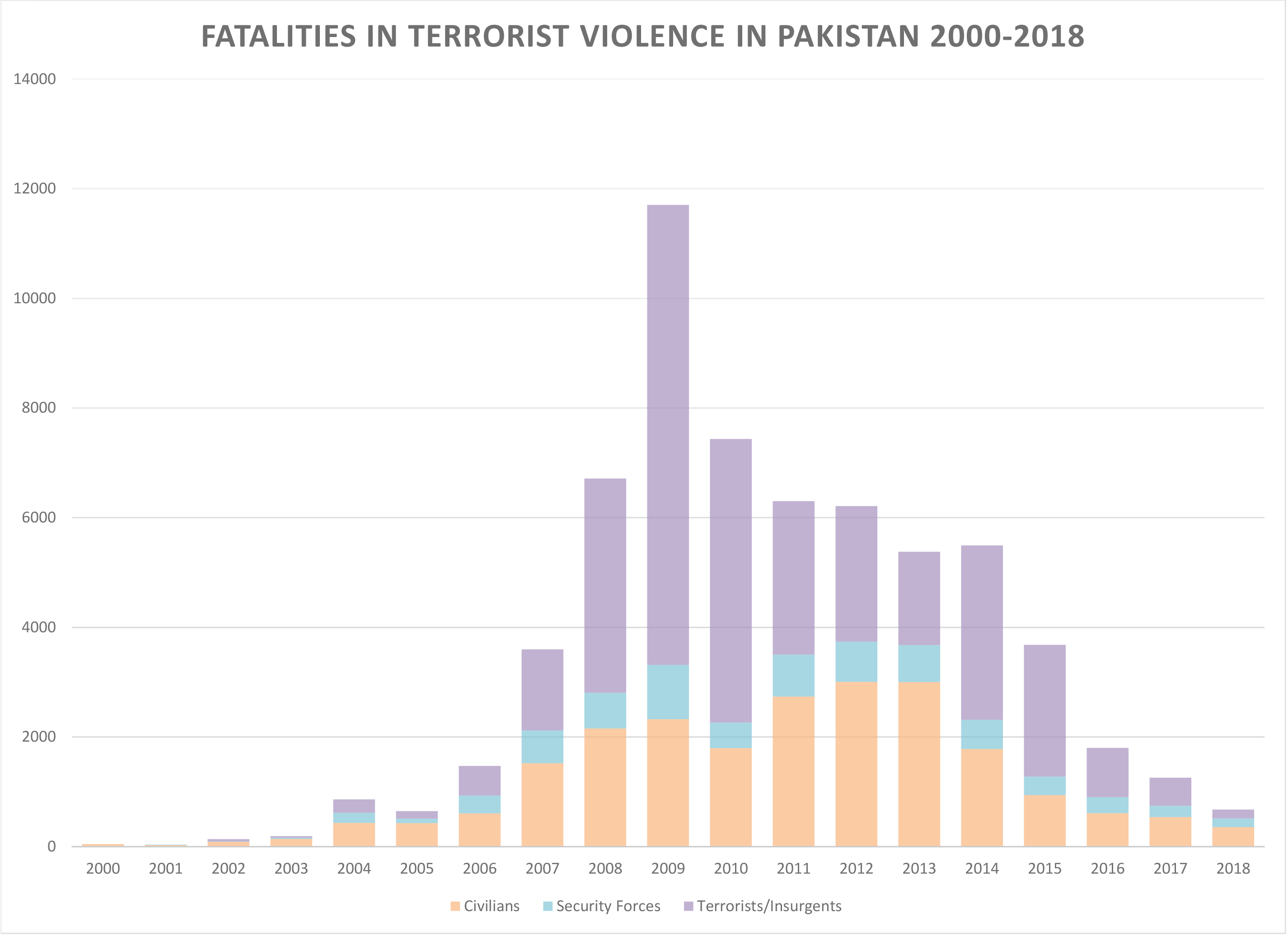
Fatalities in terrorist violence in Pakistan, (2000–2018)

In a debriefing to parliamentarians on 19 October 2011, the ISPR stated that approximately 3,097 soldiers and personnel were killed and 721 other were permanently disabled in the war on terror. The ISI lost 63 of its personnel owing to targeted assaults on ISI installations. In the same government report, it confirmed that since 2001 a total of around 40,309 Pakistanis, both military and civilian, had lost their lives in the conflict.

In addition, the TTP and central Asian militant groups suffered a staggering number of human casualties, and according to the reports around 20,742 militants had been killed or captured by February 2010. Among these, by November 2007, were 488 foreign fighters killed, 24 others arrested and 324 injured. 220 policemen were killed in fighting in 2007 and 2008. Before all-out fighting broke out in 2003, independent news sources reported only four incidents of deaths of Pakistani forces in 2001 and 2002, in which a total of 20 soldiers and policemen were killed.

The data compiled by the independent South Asia Terrorism Portal website shows that around 63,872 people were killed all across Pakistan including at least 34,106 terrorists, 7,118 security forces personnel and 22,648-plus civilians from 2000 to May 2019.

Naushad Ali Khan of Pakistan Government's Research and Analysis, Khyber-Pakhtunkhwa Police in his article Suicide and terrorist attacks and police actions in NWFP, Pakistan has provided details of different activities of the terrorists during 2008. Accordingly, 483 cases were registered with 533 deaths and 1,290 injured. Similarly, 29 suicidal attacks were recorded, resulting 247 deaths and 695 injuries. During the same period 83 attempts acts of terrorism were foiled by the Khyber-Pakhtunkhwa Police.

Between January and August 2025, Khyber Pakhtunkhwa's police recorded 605 security-related incidents, resulting in the deaths of at least 138 civilians and 79 police personnel; August alone saw 129 incidents, including the killing of six Pakistan Army and Federal Constabulary members.

== Issues with war veterans ==
Pakistan does not have its own equivalent to the United States Department of Veterans Affairs. There is also no federal ministry that looks after veteran affairs. Most of Pakistan's infantry come from lower income, poor families, mainly from the rural areas of the country. They remain unknown from the time of their recruitment, and for the most part, to the time of their leave or death. Because there is no network of support that goes out to veterans, some believe that Pakistan's veterans are facing similar issues like those faced by Vietnam veterans. Politicians hardly ever mention the veterans in speeches or statements. This is because civil society hardly ever inquires or hears about the physical and mental challenges facing Pakistan's veterans. How to re-integrate veterans in to society is an issue that has yet to be addressed.

== United States role ==
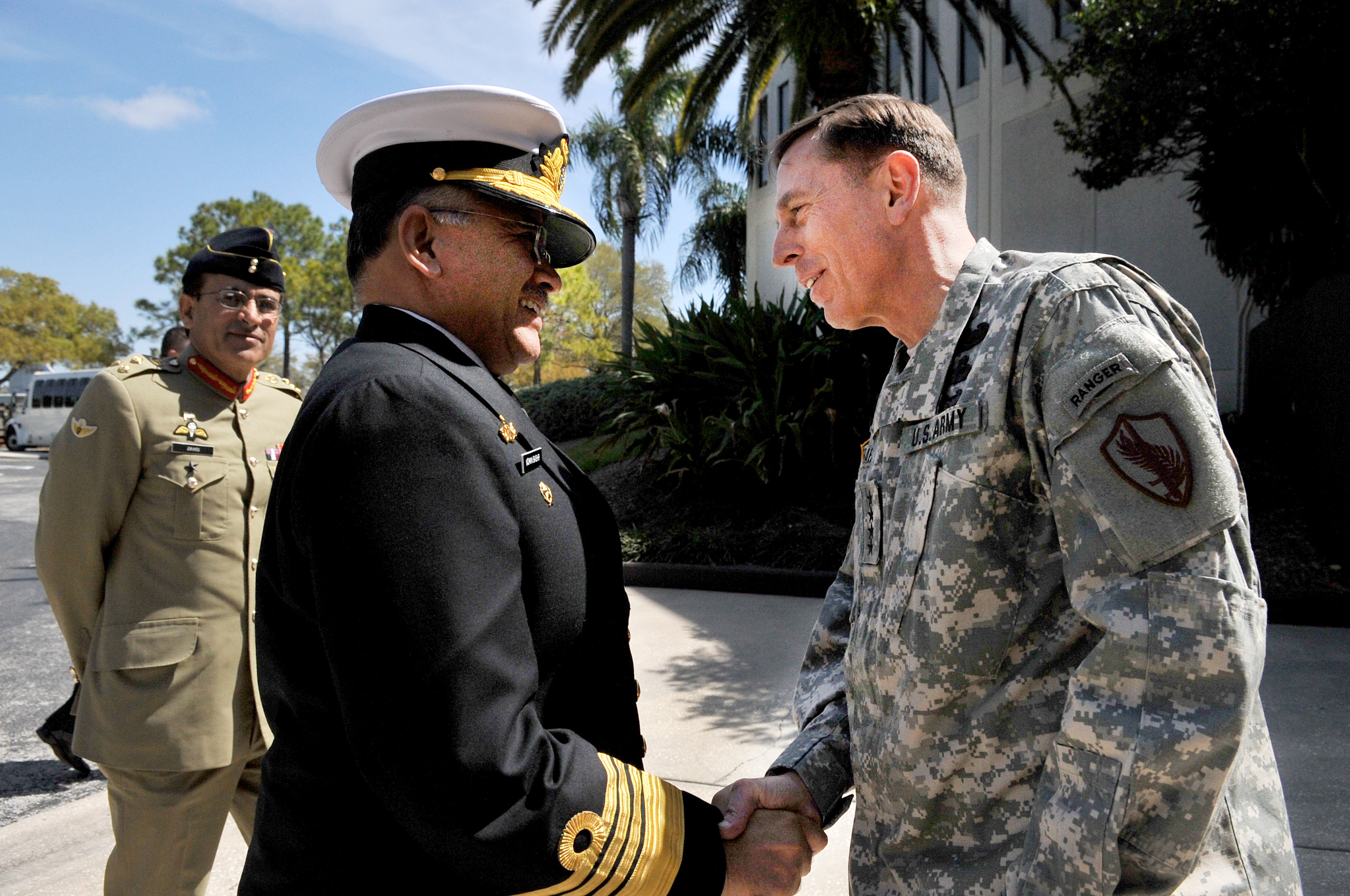
CNS Admiral Noman Bashir shakes hand with General David Petraeus to strengthen the partnership with the United States.

The U.S. Ambassador Cameron Munter found it difficult to counter the Anti-American sentiment in the country, especially after the Raymond Davis incident. The Anti-Americanism sentiment in Pakistan is one of the strongest in the world. The Anti-Americanism has risen as a result of U.S. military drone strikes introduced by President George W. Bush and continued by President Barack Obama as his counter-terrorism policy. As of 2010, almost 60%–80% of Pakistanis considered the United States as an enemy combatant state. The Anti-Americanism has been provoked mainly as a reaction from those who are critical of American CIA activities in Pakistan, such as the infamous break-out of the Raymond Allen Davis incident and American intrusions from Afghanistan border such as the 2011 NATO attack in Pakistan. The credibility of the Obama administration was undermined in the country and, furthermore, approximately 4 in 10 Pakistanis believe that U.S. military and economic aid is having a negative impact on their country; only 1 in 10 believes the impact has been positive. In 2010, Pakistan purchased 1,000 laser-guided bomb kits and 18 F-16 fighter jets from the U.S.

=== Economics and cost of war ===
Studies and research conducted by Pakistan's leading economists and the financial experts, the war hit Pakistan's national economy "very hard", and the outcomes produced by the war on country's national economy, were surprising and unexpected to Pakistan's military and economic planners. The Pakistani government's economic institutions referred to the conflict as "economic terrorism" and according to Pakistani officials, the indirect and direct cost of the war was around $2.67 billion in 2001–02, which reached up to $13.6 billion by 2009–10, was projected to rise to $17.8 billion in the 2010–11 financial year. The country's national investment-to-GDP ratio has nosedived from 22.5% in 2006–07 which went down to 13.4% in 2010–11 with serious consequences for job creating ability of the economy. The leading English language newspaper, The Nation gave great criticism to United States, and called U.S. role as "economic terrorism" in South Asia.

Economic decay during the time of conflict. Exponentially rising the GDP to 8.96% (2004), it decayed to 1.21% (2008–09).

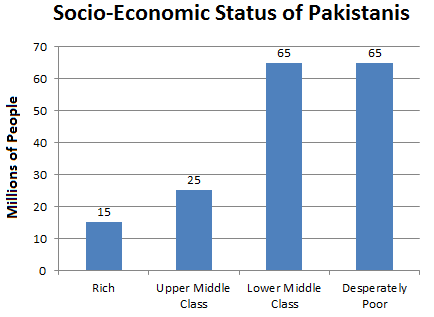
Socioeconomic graph: The war hit Pakistan's national economy very hard, generally affecting 65 million people.

Until November 2016 the conflict, as well as terrorism in Pakistan, had cost Pakistan $118.3 billion. According to US Congress and the Pakistani media, Pakistan has received about $18 billion from the United States for the logistical support it provided for the counter-terrorism operations from 2001 to 2010, and for its own military operation mainly in Waziristan and other tribal areas along the Durand Line. The Bush administration also offered an additional $3 billion five-year aid package to Pakistan for becoming a frontline ally in its "war on terror". Annual installments of $600 million each split evenly between military and economic aid, began in 2005.

In 2009, President Barack Obama pledged to continue supporting Pakistan and said that Pakistan would be provided economic aid of $1.5 billion each year for the next five years. Unfolding a new US strategy to defeat Taliban and Al-Qaeda, Obama said Pakistan must be a 'stronger partner' in destroying Al-Qaeda safe havens. In addition, President Obama has also planned to propose an extra $2.8 billion in aid for the Pakistani military to intensify the U.S.-led "war on terror" along the Pakistan-Afghanistan border. The military aid would be in addition to the civilian aid of $1.5 billion a year for the next five years from 2009 onwards.

In his autobiography, President Musharraf wrote that the United States had paid millions of dollars to the Pakistan government as bounty money for capturing Al-Qaeda operatives from tribal areas bordering Afghanistan. About 359 of them were handed over to the U.S. for prosecution.

== See also ==
- Aftermath of Soviet war in Afghanistan
- Terrorism in Pakistan
- Violence in Pakistan 2006–09
- Sectarian violence in Pakistan
- Civil Armed Forces
- Military history of the North-West Frontier
- Afghanistan–Pakistan relations
- Pakistan–United States relations
- India and state-sponsored terrorism
- MQM violence (1994–2016)
- MQM militancy
- Insurgency in Sindh
- Insurgency in Balochistan
- Separatist movements of Pakistan
