= Faqir Mohammed =

Taliban leader

- Born: 1970 (age 55–56); Sewai, North-West Frontier Province, Pakistan
- Organization(s): Tehrik-i-Taliban Pakistan; Haqqani network

Maulvi Faqir Mohammed (Pashto/Urdu: فقیر محمد; c. 1970) is an Islamist militant and, until March 2012, a deputy leader of the Pakistani Taliban umbrella group Tehrik-i-Taliban Pakistan. He was reported as killed on 5 March 2010 during a helicopter gunship attack on militants by the Pakistani military although he denied the reports as false. In July 2011, he resurfaced on the air broadcasting radio shows out of Afghanistan. He was captured in Afghanistan on 17 February 2013, and released by the Afghan Taliban when they captured Afghanistan in 2021.

== Early life and education ==
Mohammed was born in 1970 in Sewai, a village in Bajaur District's Mamund Subdivision, into a Pashtun family of the Mamund clan. Belonging to a religious family, he studied in a local madrasa under Maulana Abdus Salam, a Deobandi cleric under whom he achieved the Dars-i Nizami graduation in the 1990s, then studied the Quran in the Darul-Uloom Panjpir in the Swabi District, known to promote a local form of Wahhabism. In terms of political activities he was initially a local leader of the Jamaat-e-Islami Pakistan before joining Sufi Muhammad's Tehreek-e-Nafaz-e-Shariat-e-Mohammadi (TNSM) in 1993 or 1994. While in Afghanistan he also fought the Soviets in the 1980s and for the Taliban in the 1990s.

He has one wife in a tribal society where polygamy is not uncommon.

Mohammed was a staunch activist of TNSM, to the extent that he has been considered Sufi Mohammad's confidant and right hand man. He and his two sons were captured in Afghanistan after the fall of the Taliban in late 2001, and were held in Dera Ismail Khan jail in southern Pakistan. However, he successfully fled back to Pakistan, where his knowledge of the territory has been useful to Al-Qaeda operatives.

He has been sanctioned as a Specially Designated Global Terrorist under the Specially Designated Nationals and Blocked Persons List by the United States Department of the Treasury's Office of Foreign Assets Control; where he is listed as a member of the Haqqani network with a birth year of 1968, a place of birth in either North Waziristan Agency, Pakistan or Federally Administered Tribal Areas, Pakistan or Khowst Province, Afghanistan, and residential addresses in Bannu, Pakistan, or Lahore.

== Relationship with al-Qaeda ==
His house was raided by Pakistani security agencies hunting a "high-value" al-Qaeda target in 2005. Public sympathy raised him into a position of leadership in the Bajaur Agency. His house was raided again on 22 January 2006, and three of his relatives were arrested. He is a wanted man due to suspected contacts with Taliban and Al-Qaeda militants. Faqir has publicly stated that he has close ties to Ayman al-Zawahiri.

For his part, Faqir Mohammed strongly denies any presence of al-Qaeda or Taliban leadership in the area and says, "According to Pashtun tradition we will definitely exact revenge on America. Ayman al-Zawahiri never came here but if he wanted to come, we will welcome him, and it will be a great pleasure for us to be his host" (Daily Jang, 23 January 2006). President Pervez Musharraf, however, is insistent that "al-Qaeda fighters were probably killed in a suspected CIA air strike that killed 18 civilians in Bajaur Agency earlier this month...now that we have started investigating the reality on the ground, yes we have found that there are foreigners there, that is for sure." (The Nation, 25 January 2006).

He commented on the Chenagai airstrike which occurred in October 2006.

== Commander Faqir ==
Though not a tribal chief or elder, he has a security team and 15-20 followers. Faqir and his entourage travel in the Bajaur region with impunity.

However, his house was burnt down by tribal elders as is custom. He was warned in January 2006 that failure to surrender to authorities would result in his house being burnt down again.

He is third in command of the Pakistani Taliban umbrella group Tehrik-i-Taliban Pakistan (TTP), formed in December 2007 under the leadership of Baitullah Mehsud and prefers the title Commander Faqir.

== 2009 Ceasefire ==
On 23 February 2009 Faqir Mohammed declared in a 30-minute radio broadcast that his followers would begin a unilateral ceasefire. The speech came only a few hours after the Pakistani military announced a halt to operations in the nearby Swat valley, where it had been battling the Swati division of the TTP under the leadership of Maulana Fazlullah.

== TTP leadership changes ==
After Baituallah Mehsud's reported death in August 2009, Maulana Faqir Mohammed announced to the BBC that he would assume temporary leadership of the TTP and that Muslim Khan would serve as primary spokesperson. He also maintained that Baitullah had not been killed but rather was in ill health. Faqir further elaborated that decisions over leadership of the umbrella group would only be made in consultation and consensus with other TTP leaders. "The congregation of Taliban leaders has 32 members and no important decision can be taken without their consultation," he told the BBC. He reported to the AFP that both Hakimullah Mehsud and Wali-ur-Rehman had approved his appointment as temporary leader of the militant group. Neither militant had publicly confirmed Faqir's statement, and analysts cited by Dawn News believed the assumption of leadership actually indicated a power struggle.

Two days later Faqir Mohammed retracted his claims of temporary leadership and said that Hakimullah Mehsud had been selected leader of the TTP.

== Reported death ==
After the alleged death of Hakimullah Mehsud in mid-January, 2010, Faqir Mohammed was one of the highest level leaders. Malik Noor Jamal alias Maulana Toofan was reported to have been appointed as head of the TTP after Mehsud's death but his leadership may not have been entirely accepted as there were also reports of deadly clashes between Toofan's men and those of a TTP leader in Kurram. Pakistan launched an air attack on a building where it was thought that Faqir Mohammed was having a meeting with Taliban figures Fateh Mohammad and Qari Ziaur Rehman. Fateh Mohammed was quickly confirmed as dead but the death of the other two was not known immediately. Within days, Faqir Mohammed gave a telephone interview and claimed that he was not present at the attack and that all senior officials had survived.

== Cross-border raids ==
Faqir Mohammed launched attacks on Pakistani border posts from Afghanistan's eastern Kunar province, across the border with Pakistan's Bajaur Agency, and was hosted by Qari Zia-ur-Rahman. Mohammed claimed responsibility for a 4 July 2011, attack on a paramilitary checkpoint and for similar attacks in June 2011 on several border villages in Bajaur. During a radio broadcast Mohammed stated, "Our fighters carried out these two attacks from Afghanistan, and we will launch more such attacks inside Afghanistan and in Pakistan."

== TTP demotion ==
In early March 2012 the TTP announced that Faqir had been demoted from his role as naib amir and would be "considered a common fighter." The main TTP spokesman, Ehsanullah Ehsan, reported that Faqir Mohammed had been conducting peace talks with the Pakistani government without the approval of TTP leadership.

== Arrest ==
On 18 February 2013, Maulvi Faqir was arrested along with his four accomplices by Afghan Intelligence Officials while he was trying to enter Pakistan's Tirah Valley from Afghanistan's Nangarhar province.

== Release ==
Faqir was released by the Afghan Taliban in August 2021 when it freed thousands of prisoners as it overran Afghanistan.

== 2021 Kunar Strike ==
On 16 December 2021, reports of an attack of undetermined nature on a compound in the Kunar province targeting Faqir Mohammad emerged. BBC Pashto cited multiple Taliban officials with conflicting accounts; Bilal Karimi, deputy spokesman for the Afghan Taliban said there were 3 rocket strikes by Pakistan in the Kunar region but failed to report any targets or confirm injuries or casualties, the article further quoted un-named local Afghan Taliban sources from Kunar who corroborated that it was a drone strike, further adding the attack supposedly targeted Faqir Mohammad's compound.

A Reuters article later quoted Taliban sources that a drone strike targeting Faqir Mohammad's house in Kunar had failed to explode.

The drone strike came amidst ceasefire talks between the Pakistani Government and the TTP breaking down and on the 7th anniversary of APS Peshawar Massacre by TTP that left 148 dead including 132 students, the drone strike is yet to be claimed by a state, or a non-state actor.

== See also ==
- Khar (Pakistan)
- Kunar Province
- Nari district
- Dangam district
