= Nizam-e-Adl Regulation 2009 =

2009 Legislative Act in Pakistan

The Nizam-e-Adl Regulation (Urdu: نظام عدل ریگولیشن, lit. 'Order of Justice') was an act passed on April 13, 2009, by Government of Pakistan that formally established Sharia law in the Malakand division. Pakistan People's Party led government passed the bill after a coalition partner ANP government in Khyber Pakhtunkhwa negotiated the peace deal with outlawed Tehreek-e-Nafaz-e-Shariat-e-Mohammadi.

The measure was enacted in the context of the collapse of the Waziristan Accord and the onset of the War in North-West Pakistan, which was triggered by the Siege of Lal Masjid.

== Background ==
In the wake of the U.S. invasion of neighboring Afghanistan and the resurgence of the Taliban, regions surrounding the Afghan-Pakistani border suffered great destabilization. After the siege of Lal Masjid in 2007, Pakistani troops and Islamic militants vied for control of the Swat Valley.

Reports suggested that Maulana Fazlullah and his Taliban-aligned Tehreek-e-Nafaz-e-Shariat-e-Mohammadi (TNSM) had established control of 59 villages in the region and as much as 70 percent of the Swat.

In an effort to end the violence the Awami National Party-led provincial government of the North-West Frontier Province negotiated the release in 2008 of Sufi Muhammad, the founder of TNSM and father-in-law of Fazlullah, once he had renounced violence and agreed to work towards a political solution.

Muhammad took part in negotiations that led to the announcement of a temporary ceasefire in the Malakand region on February 16, 2009. The provincial government agreed to allow the implementation of Sharia in the region once violence had stopped. Muhammad traveled to Swat to discuss peace with Fazlullah and his followers, who agreed to observe the ceasefire.

On February 24, 2009 Muslim Khan, spokesperson of the Tehrik-i-Taliban Pakistan (TTP) publicly announced that his group would observe an indefinite ceasefire. The ANP sent the bill to President Asif Ali Zardari, who delayed signing it into law until "the writ of the government [had] been established."

The tentative ceasefire was threatened in early April 2009 when Sufi Muhammad, stating that the government was stalling the implementation of sharia courts in the Swat valley, ended support for peace negotiations. President Zardari refused to sign any agreement until peace had been restored in the valley but failed to elaborate on how those conditions would be achieved.

== Enactment ==
Facing increased political pressure to reach a settlement, President Zardari signed the regulation into law on April 13, 2009, after a National Assembly resolution approved of the measure. Although the Constitution of Pakistan allowed the president to enact laws for the Provincially Administered Tribal Areas without the approval of Parliament, Zardari used the non-binding resolution for moral support. Prime Minister Yousuf Raza Gilani stated, "We want consensus of the whole nation. We want to take the house into confidence. We don't want to bypass the parliament." The resolution was supported by Zardari's Pakistan Peoples Party, the Awami National Party, the Pakistan Muslim League-N, the Pakistan Muslim League-Q, the Jamiat Ulema-i-Islam and generally pro-government Fata officials. The Muttahida Qaumi Movement (MQM) opposed the motion but abstained from the vote.

=== Implementation ===
After becoming law, the Nizam-e-Adl was retroactively effective starting on March 15, 2009. The system has three tiers: ilaqa (local area) court, the zila (district) court and the Darul qaza, which acts as a supreme court. Contrary to Taliban demands, the courts refer to the Sharia interpretation of the sects involved in the dispute rather than that of the militant group.

Local Swatis expressed approval of the act citing much improved decision times and impartiality before the qazi.

On 3 May 2009, the TNSM and the TTP decried the government-appointed qazis and the fact that the government unilaterally selected the judges without consulting Sufi Mohammad.

== Reactions ==
=== Support for the regulation ===
Proponents of the measure believed that the current military strategy was failing to prevent further bloodshed and that passage of the regulation would allow for a peaceful resolution to the violence plaguing the Swat valley. They stated that the move towards sharia reflected the will of the people and that historical precedents existed for that type of governance in the region. Proponents portrayed this regulation as a modification of past agreements: the Nifaz-i-Nizam-i-Sharia Regulation of 1994 and the Sharia Regulation of 1999.

In May 2009 on the American television program The Daily Show, Pakistani Ambassador Husain Haqqani provided another reason for the peace deal to host Jon Stewart:

"President Zardari did something very smart. When he was with President Obama recently, he explained it. He actually told the American government that I’m going to do this deal to try and prove to those within Pakistan, and in Pakistan’s state apparatus, who think that these guys can be negotiated with — I will negotiate with them only to prove that you can’t negotiate with them, because they will break the deal, and as soon as they broke the deal, the army is back in, the fighting is going on, and you can see the results."

=== Opposition to the regulation ===
Opponents characterized the regulation's enactment as capitulation to the militants' demands. Farooq Sattar of the MQM told the AP, "We can't accept Islamic law at gunpoint." Critics also maintained that the agreement would lead to "Talibanization" of the region.

In an interview with USA Today, Nawaz Sharif of the Pakistan Muslim League (N) expressed concerns that militants would attempt to export their system of Sharia to other regions of Pakistan. "They are now threatening to get out of Swat and take other areas into their custody. So we've got to avoid that situation."

=== International ===
PM Gilani downplayed outside concerns of the regulation. "This is our country. We know the ground realities better... We know much better what kind of strategy should be evolved," he said in a television interview on April 20, 2009. He also stressed that the deal was contingent upon peace and stability returning to the region.

==== Afghanistan ====
The Islamic Republic of Afghanistan expressed concerns that the regulation would strengthen militants along its shared border with Pakistan. A spokesperson for then-President of Afghanistan Hamid Karzai said, "Since any deal with terrorist groups can have effects on the security of our own country and people, we ask the country of Pakistan to take into consideration the issue of security and its side-effects on relations between the two countries."

==== United States ====
U.S. Secretary of State Hillary Clinton told the House Foreign Affairs Committee that "the Pakistani government is basically abdicating to the Taliban and to the extremists," and that the situation in Pakistan "poses a mortal threat to the security and safety of our country and the world." An article in the New York Times published April 23, 2009 quoted several military and government officials who expressed doubts about Pakistani efforts against the Taliban. Senator Jack Reed said, "It illustrates there is a lack of political will in the Pakistan civilian leadership to confront these Pakistan Taliban... The Taliban sense this huge vacuum that they can pour into." In the same article, a United States Defense Department official told the newspaper, "The government is too worried about its own political survival to take on the militants."

==== Non-governmental organizations ====
Amnesty International expressed concern that the ceasefire agreement would legitimize human rights abuses in the region.

== Outcomes ==
BBC News reported that Taliban in the Swat District began to expand into the neighboring district of Buner after the peace deal was finalized. Muslim Khan of the TTP declared that the group would not lay down its arms until full implementation of Sharia in the region had been achieved. After militants began to withdraw from Buner, violence erupted in the Lower Dir district that threatened to further unravel the peace accord. On April 27, 2009, Sufi Mohammad announced that he was pulling out of peace negotiations due to the military operation, which the Army referred to as a "retaliatory strike," in Lower Dir. According to the military, the strike was a response to the killings of a police officer and a local administrator and to Taliban expansion outside of Swat. Although TTP spokesman Muslim Khan referred to the agreement as "worthless," Sufi's spokesperson, Amir Izzat, told media that negotiations would resume once the actions in Lower Dir came to an end.

== See also ==
- War in North-West Pakistan
- Operation Black Thunderstorm
