= Shah Dauran (militant) =

Pakistani Talban commander (died 2009)

Maulana Shah Dauran (died 17 December 2009) was an Islamist militant from Swat, Pakistan. He was a deputy of Fazlullah, the chief of the Pakistani Taliban, in Swat. He was one of the most wanted militants and a close aide of Swat Taliban chief Maulana Fazlullah. He was known for his hawkish views against opponents. The government of Khyber Pakhtunkhwa had a 10 million rupees bounty on Dauran.

== Early life ==
Shah Dauran, the son of a watchman at a local fuel station, was a resident of Qambar (a village of Swat close to Mingora), where he ran a madrasah. Dauran sold bakery products. He gave up selling bakery products and began challenging the writ of the government on radio with threats to people opposing the Taliban.

== Tehreek-e-Nafaz-e-Shariat-e-Mohammadi ==
He joined the Taliban group in 2007 and soon became a member of its shura (consultative body). His leader, Maulana Fazlullah, was broadcasting his show on an FM radio channel heard in upper parts of Swat, while Dauran used to run his FM channel in lower Swat. Unlike Fazlullah's polite tone, Shah Dauran was said to have a harsh in his broadcasts. He went to Afghanistan several times and participated in Afghan jihad.

== FM radio or Mullah radio ==
Shah Dauran often used his FM channel to warn government employees to back the Taliban or leave their service.

He also used the radio to claim responsibility for Taliban attacks. On 28 December, he claimed responsibility for the suicide bombing killing 44 people at a polling station in Shalbandai village in Buner district. On another occasion, he announced that Taliban had killed a female dancer, Shabana, in Mingora. It was Dauran who announced a ban on girls' education in Swat. In his later days, when Fazlullah was hiding from the Pakistani Army, he led the Taliban in Swat.

== Death ==
Dauran died on 17 December 2009 in Bajaur after a prolonged illness. Sources said that he was hiding somewhere in Bajaur, suffering from kidney disease and the injuries he received during the fighting in Swat becoming gangrenous. His condition deteriorated due to lack of proper medication in the remote tribal region. He was buried in Damadola, Bajur Agency.

== See also ==
- Fazlullah (Militant leader)
- Second Battle of Swat
- Tehreek-e-Nafaz-e-Shariat-e-Mohammadi
