= Salim Medical Centre, Dherai =

Geography
- Location: Derai, Swat, Khyber Pakhtunkhwa, Pakistan
- Coordinates: 34.811188°N 72.351725°E (approximate)

Organisation
- Type: General

History
- Opened: 27 September 1995

Links
- Lists: Hospitals in Pakistan

Salim Medical Centre Derai is one of the main welfare medical centres run by qualified doctors and nursing staff for the welfare of the people of Derai . Salim Medical Centre Derai was established on 27 September 1995.

== Address ==
Salim Medical Centre, Derai, near Saidu Sharif Airport postcode 19200, Swat Khyber Pakhtunkhwa, Pakistan.

== See also ==
- Saidu Teaching Hospital
- Kuzcham Dherai
