= Malakand insurrection (1994–1995) =

Insurrection

- Part of Terrorism in Pakistan and the spillover of the Afghan conflict, Afghan Civil War (1992–1996) and the prelude to Insurgency in Khyber Pakhtunkhwa
| Date | 1 November 1994 – 19 June 1995 |
| Location | Malakand Division |
| Result | Pakistani victory: Suppression of rebellion |

Belligerents
| Pakistan | TNSM |

Commanders and leaders
| Unknown | Sufi Muhammad |

Units involved
| Pakistan Armed Forces; Pakistan Army; XI Corps; Artillery Regiment Corps; Aviation Corps; Civil Armed Forces; Frontier Corps; Northern KPK Corps; Pakistan Levies; Malakand Levies | Tehreek-e-Nafaz-e-Shariat-e-Mohammadi; Black Turbans; Afghan jihadists |

Strength
| Unknown | 10,000+ |

Casualties and losses
| ~Heavy casualties | ~28 killed |
- 26+ wounded

Malakand revolt was a Islamist Jihadist insurrection in Pakistan's Khyber Pakhtunkhwa region by Tehreek-e-Nafaz-e-Shariat-e-Mohammadi under the command of Sufi Muhammad in Malakand Division on the basis of a demand for Sharia law. Multiple areas were captured by the TNSM militants. The uprising was quashed by the Pakistan government and armed forces resulting in militant-occupied areas being captured and a peace deal being signed.

It is regarded as the first ever jihadist uprising in Pakistan with the sole purpose being the establishment of TNSM's interpretation of Islamic Sharia.

== Background ==
In northwest Pakistan, three princely states Dir, Swat and Chitral were abolished and reorganized to form the Malakand Division in 1970. This also abolished the laws of princely state especially the Sharia implementation in Swat. During the Soviet Afghan war, many militants from this area went to Afghanistan for Jihad. Upon returning they started campaigning for Sharia law and established an organisation named as Tehreek-e-Nafaz-e-Shariat-e-Mohammadi.

== Rebellion ==
=== November 1994 insurrection ===
In November 1994, Tehreek-e-Nafaz-e-Shariat-e-Mohammadi under Sufi Muhammad led a revolt for the implementation of Sharia law in the Malakand Division. (Note: Sources) A large number of Afghan Mujahideen from the nearby areas also came to aid the rebellion. Timergara, the headquarters of Lower Dir, was besieged by government, artillery Shelling was carried out and fighting erupted in Swat. The Saidu Sharif Airport, roads multiple police stations and judicial courts in the area were occupied by the militants. The Sharia law was implemented in the occupied areas. They imposed driving on the right side of the road as a symbol of discontinuing British traditions. The militants established check points on mountain peaks to prevent military from entering. Approximately 700 persons, including 530 security force personnel, were killed in a week of combat before the Government quelled the rebellion. Pakistan army deployed combat and reconnaissance helicopters to the area. The Frontier Corps was deployed to regain control of the area.

=== December 1994 clashes ===
On December 4, 1994, 10,000 members of the TNSM started rally for the release of 85 captured militants but security forces responded with tear gas shelling.

=== June 1995 clashes ===
On June 19, 1995, the TNSM Chief Sufi Muhammad and 20 senior militants were arrested following an attack on security forces. In response hundreds of TNSM cadres attacked and occupied Government offices in the Swat district wounding 26 people.

== Aftermath ==
=== Reforms ===
After the introduction of the PATA Regulation, the provincial government of KPK recommended the introduction of the Shariah law. The Nizam-e-Adl Ordinance was passed by Pakistani government which made it compulsory for the civil courts to seek advice of a Qazi, who was a religious cleric learned in Islamic law. It is also alleged that while under TNSM control, drivers were forced to switch to driving on the right side of the road, which resulted in many accidents.

=== Continued insurgent presence ===
However, militant presence in the area continued especially after the 2001 Invasion of Afghanistan, which later on led to the First Battle of Swat.
