= Operation Black Thunderstorm =

Military operation conducted by Pakistan against militants

- Part of the Insurgency in Khyber Pakhtunkhwa
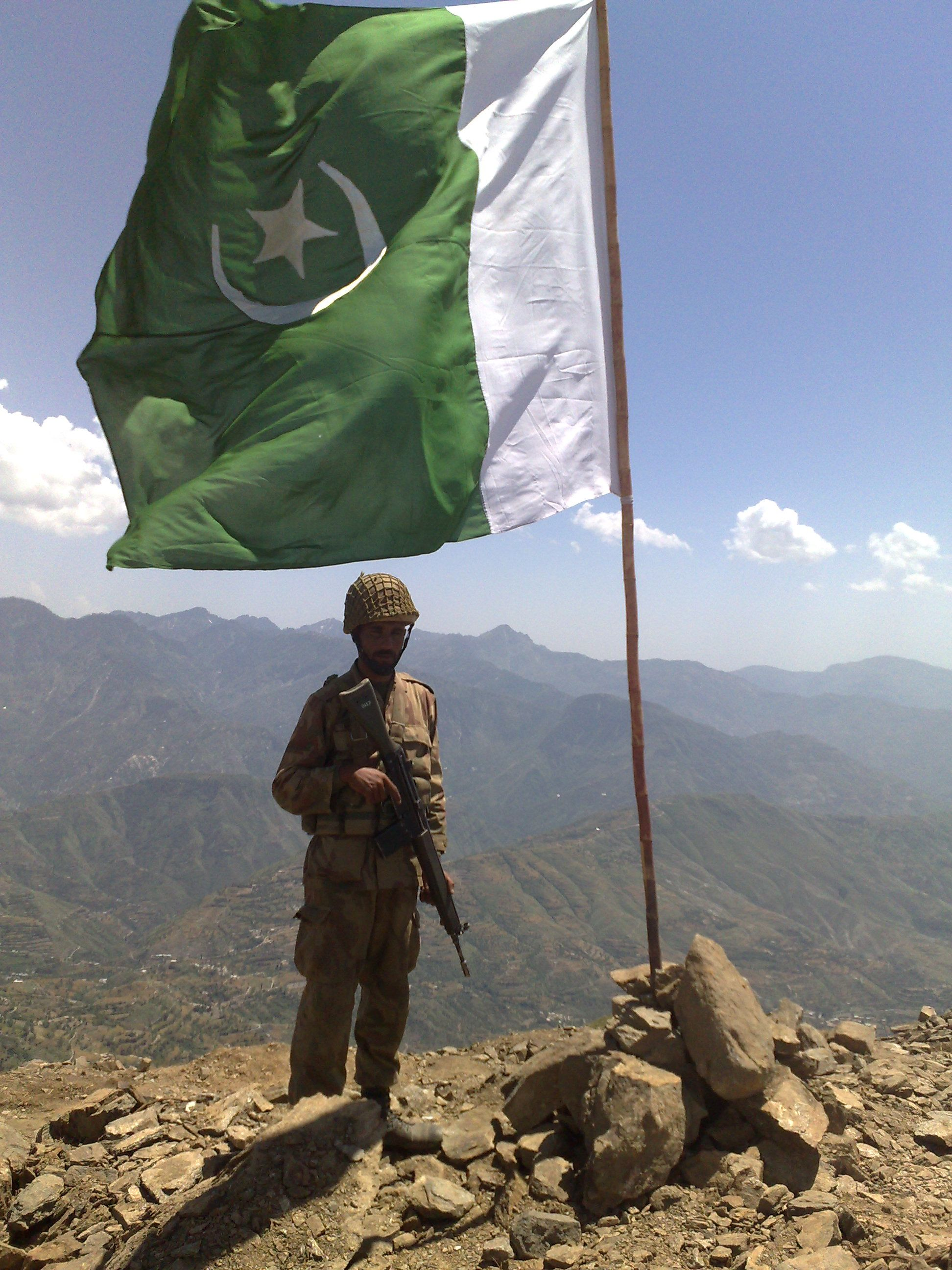
- Pakistani forces hoist the flag of Pakistan at the highest point of the Valley after the operation
| Date | 26 April 2009 – 14 June 2009 (1 month, 2 weeks and 5 days) |
| Location | Swat, Buner, Lower Dir, Shangla District, Khyber-Pakhtunkhwa Province |
| Result | Pakistani victory: Districts returned to government control, writ of the state established; Many Pakistani Taliban militants and commanders killed or captured, remaining fled to Afghanistan |

Belligerents
| Pakistan | TTP; TNSM |

Commanders and leaders
| Asif Ali Zardari (President); Tariq Majid (Chairman Joint Chiefs of Staff); Ashfaq Pervez Kayani (Chief of Army Staff); Tanvir Mahmood Ahmed (Chief of Air Staff); Operation commanders: Masood Aslam; Hifazat Khan; Ijaz Awan; Haroon Aslam; Sajjad Ghani; Tariq Khan | Maulana Fazlullah; Sufi Muhammad (POW); Maulana Ameer Izzat (POW) †; Syed Wahab (POW); Maulana Muhammad Alam (POW) † |

Units involved
| Pakistan Armed Forces; Pakistan Army; 9th Infantry Division; 50th Airborne Division; SSG Division; Pakistan Air Force; No. 25 Squadron; Civil Armed Forces; Frontier Corps; FC KPK (North); Pakistan Rangers; Punjab Rangers; Pro-government tribes | TTP; TNSM |

Strength
| 30,000 – 45,000 Regular and Airborne Forces; 500+ SSG Division | 5,000 |

Casualties and losses
| 50 killed 100 wounded | 1,475 killed (23 foreign militants); 114 captured |
- 3.4 million civilians displaced

Operation Black Thunderstorm was a military operation that commenced on 26 April 2009, conducted by the Pakistan Army, with the aim of retaking Buner, Lower Dir, Swat and Shangla districts from the Tehrik-i-Taliban Pakistan after the militants took control of them since the start of the year.

== Background ==
A temporary ceasefire was called in the Malakand region on 16 February 2009. The provincial government agreed to allow the implementation of Sharia in the region once violence had stopped. Sufi Muhammad traveled to Swat to discuss peace with Fazlullah and his followers, who agreed to observe the ceasefire. On 24 February 2009 Muslim Khan, spokesperson of the Tehrik-i-Taliban Pakistan (TTP) publicly announced that his group would observe an indefinite ceasefire. The ANP, the governing party of the Khyber Pakhtunkhwa sent the bill to President Asif Ali Zardari, who delayed signing it into law until "the writ of the government [had] been established." Soon after that the militants expanded their territory into other districts and by mid-April they took Buner, Lower Dir and Shangla. With the Taliban takeover the militants came within 60 miles (97 km) of the capital of Pakistan, Islamabad. It was the closest that Taliban forces ever got to capturing the Pakistan capital, Islamabad. This raised the alarm among western countries, particularly the United States, that a collapse of the country and a Taliban takeover was playing out. The government was highly criticized for making peace deals with the militants. Therefore, the Pakistani government launched an operation in late April to retake all territory lost in the previous months.

== Operation ==
=== Attack on Lower Dir ===
Operation Toar Tander-I (Black Thunderstorm-I) began in Lower Dir as the Frontier Corps (FC) killed 26 Taliban, including key commanders Maulana Shahid and Qari Quraish.

The operation was launched on 26 April, after the Taliban, in violation of the peace agreement, attacked security forces and government officials and closed roads for the movement of government and FC convoys. In some villages, the Taliban had looted shops and tortured villagers to gain their support, adding that a jirga had also been forced to back them.

Officials said the forces were gaining ground against the Taliban and their hideouts in Kalkot, Islam Dara and Hoshyari Dara were targeted. Paramilitary troops and helicopter gunships bombed suspected Taliban bases during the operation. Eight soldiers and around 50 militants were killed in two days of fighting. The operation mostly cleared the Lower Dir district of Taliban forces by 28 April. However, the military was still fighting with pockets of militant resistance in the coming weeks.

=== Buner Assault ===
The second phase of the operation started the same day as fighting in Lower Dir was dying down. The Pakistani Taliban had entered the town of Buner that was outside the Swat region and closer to the capital of Islamabad, had closed a local shrine and captured local policemen in defiance of the state and a prior peace agreement with the government. The Pakistan Army's push to retake control of Buner, which was only 100 kilometres (62 mi) away from the capital city Islamabad, started. Special Forces members belonging to Pakistan Army's 50th Airborne Division and the Pakistan Army's Special Services Group swarmed down ropes from helicopters to enter the town of Daggar, which lies in the strategically important Buna valley to the northwest of Islamabad, killing nearly 50 militants. Pakistan Army leaders hoped to trap about 500 militants in between the 50th Airborne forces and SSG Division's teams that were advancing on the ground towards Taliban positions at the valley's entrance. The fate of 75 police officers taken hostage by the Taliban in Buner the previous night remained unclear. 18 were rescued the next day but the others were still prisoners. The troops belonging to 50th Airborne Division jumped first on 30 April in Buner City between 00:48 and 01:40. The Pakistan Air Force's SS Wing's 1st SOS Squadron flew the No. 6 Squadron Globe Trotters transport aircraft where hundreds of additional members of 50th Airborne Division, Special Services Group - Navy, 4th SOS Squadron, 140th Expeditionary Marines Battalion and the 1st Commando Yildiram Battalion, SSG jumped off in the dark night of 31 April, and landed in different areas of Buner where they had taken the strategic positions. The battle between the Pakistani Air Force and Taliban forces ended when the Taliban had lost a large number of their men and suffered heavy human casualties caused by the Airborne Forces of Pakistan Armed Forces.

The operation in Daggar came on the third day of the Army's offensive to roll back the Taliban advance that had caused concern not just in Islamabad – which is just 65 miles away – but also in Washington. Major General Athar Abbas, a military spokesman, told reporters in Rawalpindi that the Army and Frontier Corps paramilitary units launched the operation in Buner district, building on a several-day offensive in the region. Abbas said an estimated 450 to 500 Taliban are believed active in Buner, many believed to be engaged in "criminal activities."

The US had been repeatedly pressing the Pakistan government to take action, fearful that the militants were gaining too much ground and might even use Buner as a bridgehead for an attack on Islamabad.

On 2 May, another 10 soldiers were captured in Buner. The military confirmed that some 87 militants and four soldiers had been killed in fighting in the district between 28 April and 4 May. The military also stated that its troops were confronted during the fighting with wave attacks of suicide car-bombers. At least 27 suicide bombers were killed in the fighting. By 5 May, troops started to push back the Taliban militants in Buner.

=== Operation Rah-e-Rast ===
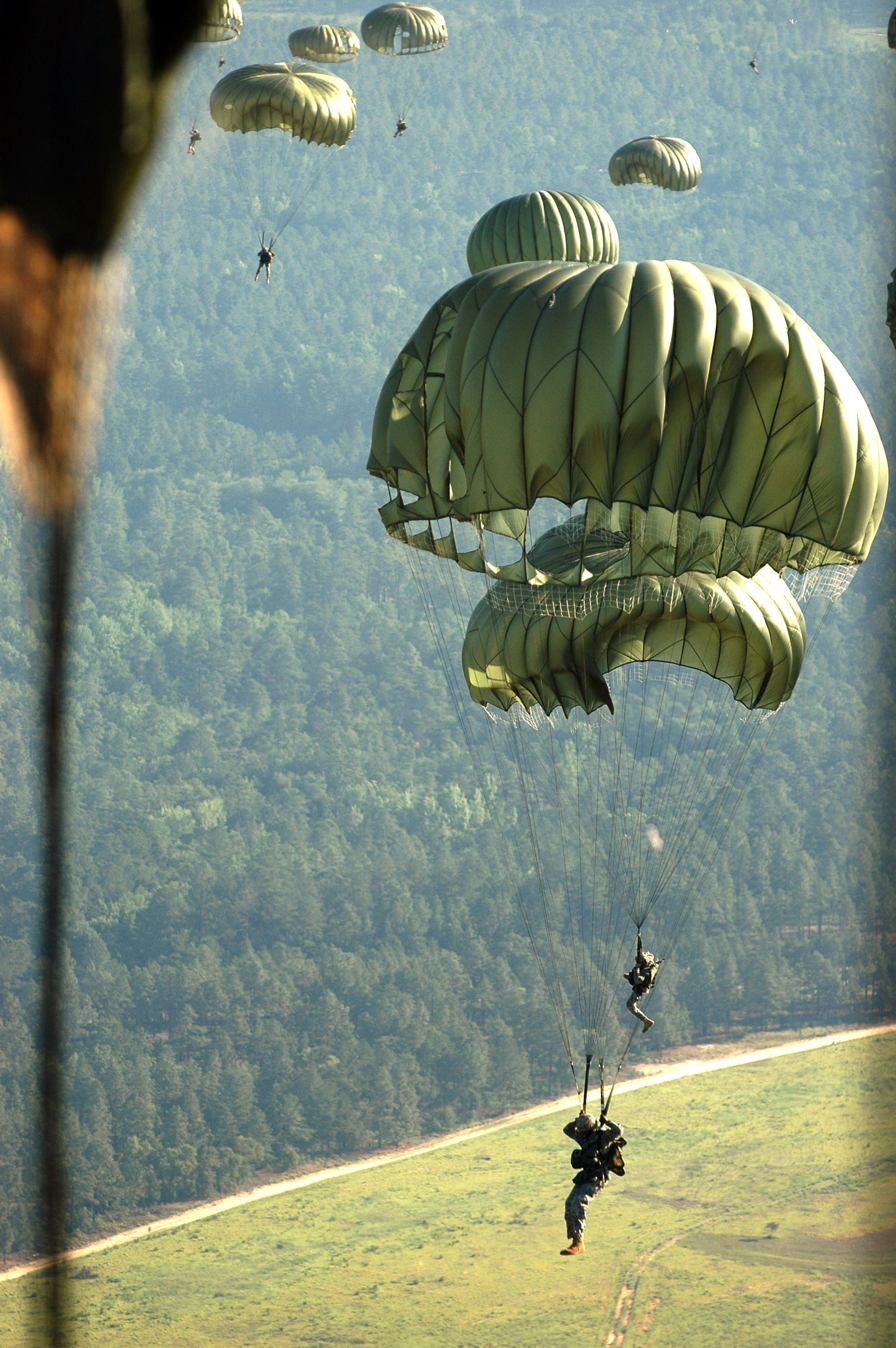
Airborne paratroopers took active participation in the war and pushed Taliban back to areas adjacent to Afghanistan.

On 5 May, the third phase of the operation started as airborne troops boarded on C-130 transport aircraft, jumped off and stormed the militant-held valley of Swat. The name of this sub-operation of Black Thunderstorm has been referred to as Operation Rah-e-Rast in Urdu. In more than a month of fighting, by 15, 30 June soldiers and 1,040 militants were killed. Militant fighters were holed up in the emerald mines and in the main town of Swat district, Mingora. The emerald mines were secured by the Army's 50th Airborne division by 7 May, but the militants were still holding their positions in Mingora and on a strategic hilltop overlooking the town. Meanwhile, on 7 May, in Lower Dir, which was previously declared clear of the Taliban by the military, militants overran a paramilitary fort, killing three paramilitary soldiers and capturing 10 policemen. On the midnight of 10 May, additional airborne troops with small teams of Pakistan Navy SEALs jumped off from C-130 transport aircraft, and attacked a Taliban hidden training camp at Banai Baba in Shangla district, which is just east from Swat. In the fighting at Banai Baba the military reported killing 150 militants for the loss of two soldiers. At the same time as the fighting in Shangla, some sporadic fighting was still continuing in Lower Dir where, over four days, 109 more militants were killed. Also, further west, in the Mohmand agency, a group of 300 militants attacked a military outpost; in the fighting that ensued 26 militants were killed and 14 soldiers were wounded. On 12 May, Pakistani SSG commandos were inserted by helicopters into the Piochar area, a rear-support base for the militants in the northern part of the Swat valley, to conduct search-and-destroy operations.

By 15 May, the Army claimed that Buner was finally completely cleared of Taliban forces, however artillery bombardment of Taliban positions in the hills was still ongoing. And it was reported that the Taliban were more dug in and in larger numbers in Buner than the military previously assumed. Meanwhile, the Pakistani military continued with their push up the Swat valley. As the military approached Mingora, the Taliban were digging in for a "bloody urban battle" against the Pakistani army's airborne forces in a hotly disputed city in the north-western part of the country. The Taliban began concentrating forces in Mingora - digging trenches, laying mines and taking positions on rooftops.

Stratfor, a private firm that describes itself as a global intelligence company, mentioned that it is not clear if the Pakistani military is trained and even equipped to go into a situation like that, adding that even the United States military "would have to think twice" about such an offensive. Pakistani military spokesman Major General Athar Abbas, who is the spokesman for Pakistan's military said "the military intends to drive the Taliban out of the contested area, even if the kind of fighting resembles that of the Battle of Stalingrad". He said that the whole resolve of the government and the military is to once and for all finish the Taliban from the Swat valley. The army has about 15,000 troops on the ground and is estimated that there are still over 5,000 Taliban fighters in the area.

On 17 May, heavy street fighting started in the towns of Kanju and Matta and the Army was slowly advancing towards Mingora. Also, a few days later fighting started in the area of the Takhtaband bridge for control of this crossing point. On 20 May, a key town in Buner was captured by the Army. The Army captured Sultanwas in fighting which, according to the military, killed one soldier and 80 militants, another nine soldiers were wounded. By 23 May, Kanju, Matta and the Takhtaband bridge had been secured by the military, but fighting was still going on in Takhtaband itself and the Buner and Dir districts, where nine more militants were killed. Meanwhile, the military was surrounding the main militant base in the Peochar Valley.

=== Battle for Mingora ===
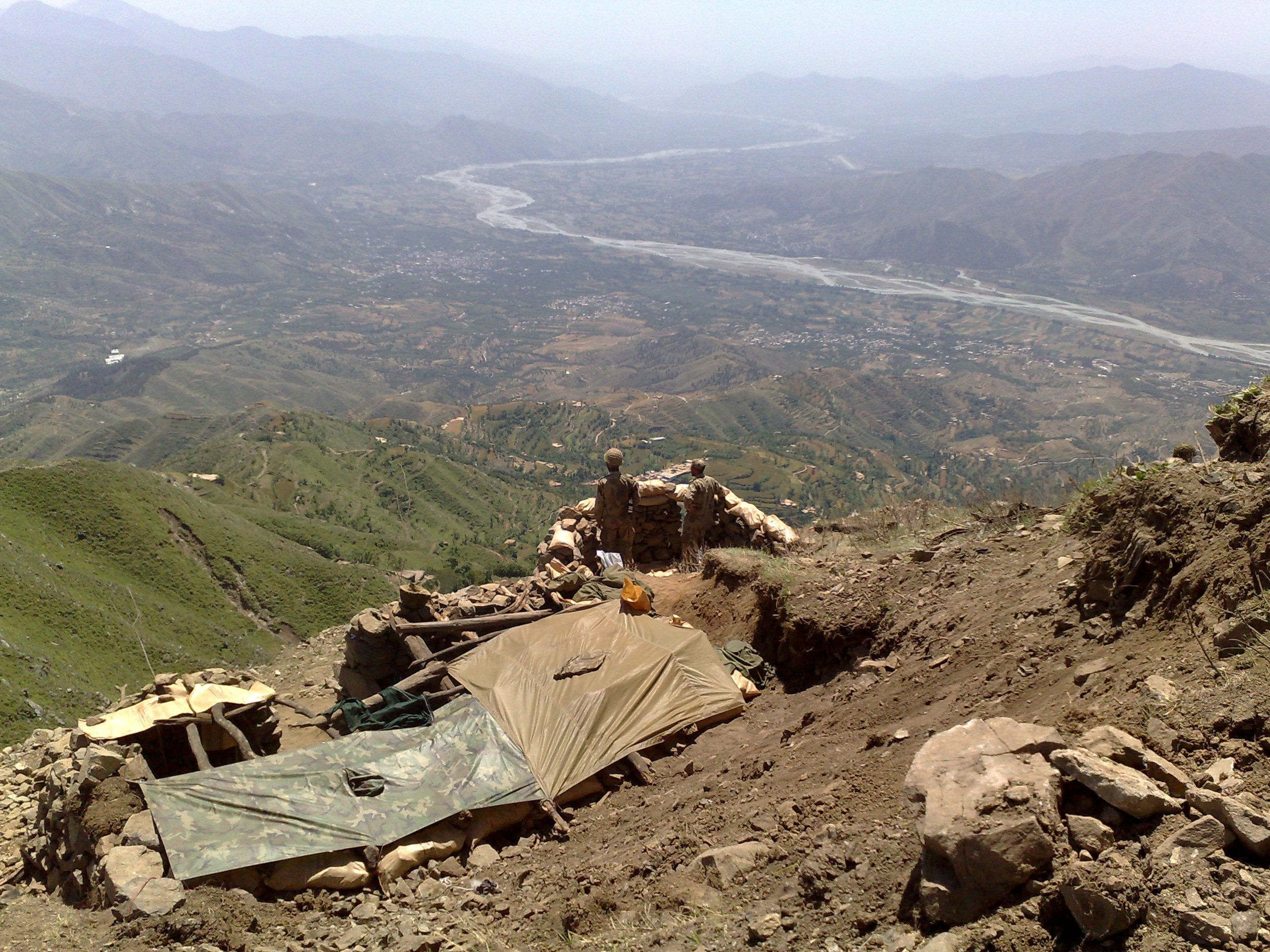
Military personnel observing the city and the valley of Swat after the successful capture.

On 23 May, the battle for the capital of Swat, Mingora, started as the small teams belonging to SSG Division accompanied with Army Rangers stormed the city. The Ranger and SSG Division's teams entered in the city from two different phases. The SSG Division's team at first entered the city from the air as they were parachuted. At the same time, the Army Rangers and additional SSG Division's teams entered the city as they were boarded on M113C and the APC Talha-B. Combat here was heavy, intense, and occurred in the streets. Taliban Fighters had dug themselves into bunkers built into hotels and government buildings. Pakistan's SSG and Army Rangers had fought the Taliban fighters hand-to-hand inside the buildings and hotels. On the first day of the tiring and long battle, fighting was mainly in the center of the city, at the central bus terminal and along the main road near the city's primary gateway. By the next day's early morning, the military captured several intersections and three squares; including Green Square, which had been known as "Bloody Intersection", because the Taliban were dumping bodies of people who they executed at that location. Intense fighting was going on in the Nawa Kilay neighbourhood and the western suburb of Qambar.

By 27 May, the military took control of 70 percent of the city, including the city's airport, and Taliban forces across Swat were in retreat, but fighting was still continuing. At the same time, in continuing battles in Lower Dir and Shangla, three more soldiers and eight militants were killed.

On 29 May, the Army cleared Aman Kot and the Technical Institute College on the Mingora-Kokarai road in Mingora. On the same day, the village of Peochar in the Peochar Valley, as well as the town of Bahrain in the north of Swat, had been taken by the military.

On 30 May, the Pakistani military had taken back the city of Mingora from the Taliban, calling it a significant victory in its offensive against the Taliban. However, some sporadic fighting was still continuing on the city's outskirts. Also, sporadic fighting was continuing in the rest of Swat and in the Shangla district where on 2 June, two soldiers and five militants were killed.

In the battle for Mingora 286 militants were killed.

=== Alleged capture of Sufi Muhammad and other leaders ===
On 4 June, it was reported that Sufi Muhammad, the founder of Tehreek-e-Nafaz-e-Shariat-e-Mohammadi or TNSM, was arrested in Amandarra along with other militant leaders. In the coming days there was confusion over this claim since the Taliban themselves said that Muhammad was missing. However, several days later it was confirmed that Muhammad was not captured and was in hiding, while two of his aides were captured by the Army. Those two aides, Muhammad Maulana Alam and Ameer Izzat Khan, were killed when militants attacked the prison transport they were in on 7 June. On 26 July 2009, the government confirmed the arrest of Sufi Mohammad for encouraging violence and terrorism.

=== Sporadic fighting ===
By this point, the Pakistan Military was in control of much of Swat, however sporadic fighting still continued, especially in the Upper Dir District. After a bomb explosion in Hayagai Sharki village's masjid in Dir, which killed 38 civilians, local tribesmen, between 1,000 and 1,500, formed a lashkar (citizen's militia) and retaliated against the Taliban and TNSM by taking up arms and surrounding almost 300 militants. In support of the Lashkars, the Pakistan Military sent its helicopter gunships to the villages of Shatkas and Ghazi Gai where the heaviest fighting was ongoing. Paramilitary soldiers also set up mortars on high ground above the villages.

On 12 June, troops captured the town of Chuprial in Swat in a major battle that left 39 militants and 10 soldiers dead. This was the last major battle, and one of the most bloody, of the operation.

On 14 June, the operation ended with Pakistani troops consolidating their positions in the four districts and going after the remaining pockets of resistance, primarily in the Swat valley.

== Casualties ==
In all, according to the military, 50 soldiers and at least 1,475 militants were killed and 100 soldiers were wounded during operation Black Thunderstorm. 114 militants were captured, including some local commanders.

== Later revelations about the Swat deal ==
On 13 May 2009, Pakistan's ambassador to the United States Husain Haqqani revealed on The Daily Show to Jon Stewart that Pakistan's decision to strike a peace deal with Taliban militants earlier, which effectively ceded control of large swathes of the country's northwest, was all part of a cunning plan to fool the Taliban, which is now coming to fruition with the commencement of Operation Black Thunderstorm. The ambassador mentioned to Jon Stewart that President Asif Ali Zardari's signing of the Nizam-e-Adl Regulation, which was the Swat peace deal, was nothing more than a trick to lure the Taliban from the mountains and countryside to the main towns where it would be much easier for the Pakistani military to kill or capture them.

"[President Zardari] did something very smart. When he was with President Obama recently, he explained it. He actually told the American government that I'm going to do this deal to try and prove to those within Pakistan, and in Pakistan's state apparatus, who think that these guys can be negotiated with — I will negotiate with them only to prove that you can't negotiate with them, because they will break the deal. And as soon as they broke the deal, the army is back in, the fighting is going on, and you can see the results."

The Swat peace-deal was heavily criticised by Hillary Clinton when she accused Pakistan's government of abdicating to the Taliban in agreeing to impose Islamic law in the Swat valley. However, according to the Pakistani Government, it was simply using "reverse psychology," as Jon Stewart phrased it, on the Taliban.

== Foreign involvement and aftermath ==
Pakistan's foreign office spokesman had confirmed that there was a heavy influx of foreigners aiding the Taliban and that weapons were coming from the adjacent country of Afghanistan. Many Pakistani defence analysts and experts had publicly accused India and Afghanistan of aiding the Taliban to destabilize Pakistan. On 19 May 2009, the Pakistan Army captured three foreign fighters from Mingora District. According to the Pakistani Army, all these foreign fighters were Libyan nationals. The Pakistani Army also captured five Saudi nationals during the search operation.

In Khybar Pass, a police raid on a local house resulted in the arrest of 20 Tajik nationals. In heavy fighting in Malakand Division, Pakistani commandos killed five Uzbek fighters. Many Pakistani political parties, such as PML-N, accused India, of providing economic and financial support to the Taliban. According to a White house press release, the United States and NATO were working with Pakistan to find out who's providing the financial support and what routes were they using to smuggle the weapons. According to the Daily Jang's investigative report, a large amount of Afghan National Army's weapons was stolen by the Taliban, and also the report claimed that there is no formal security for their weapons depots. Daily Jang also cited that a large number of Uzbeks and Tajiks were freely crossing Afghanistan's border into Pakistan to fight against Pakistan.

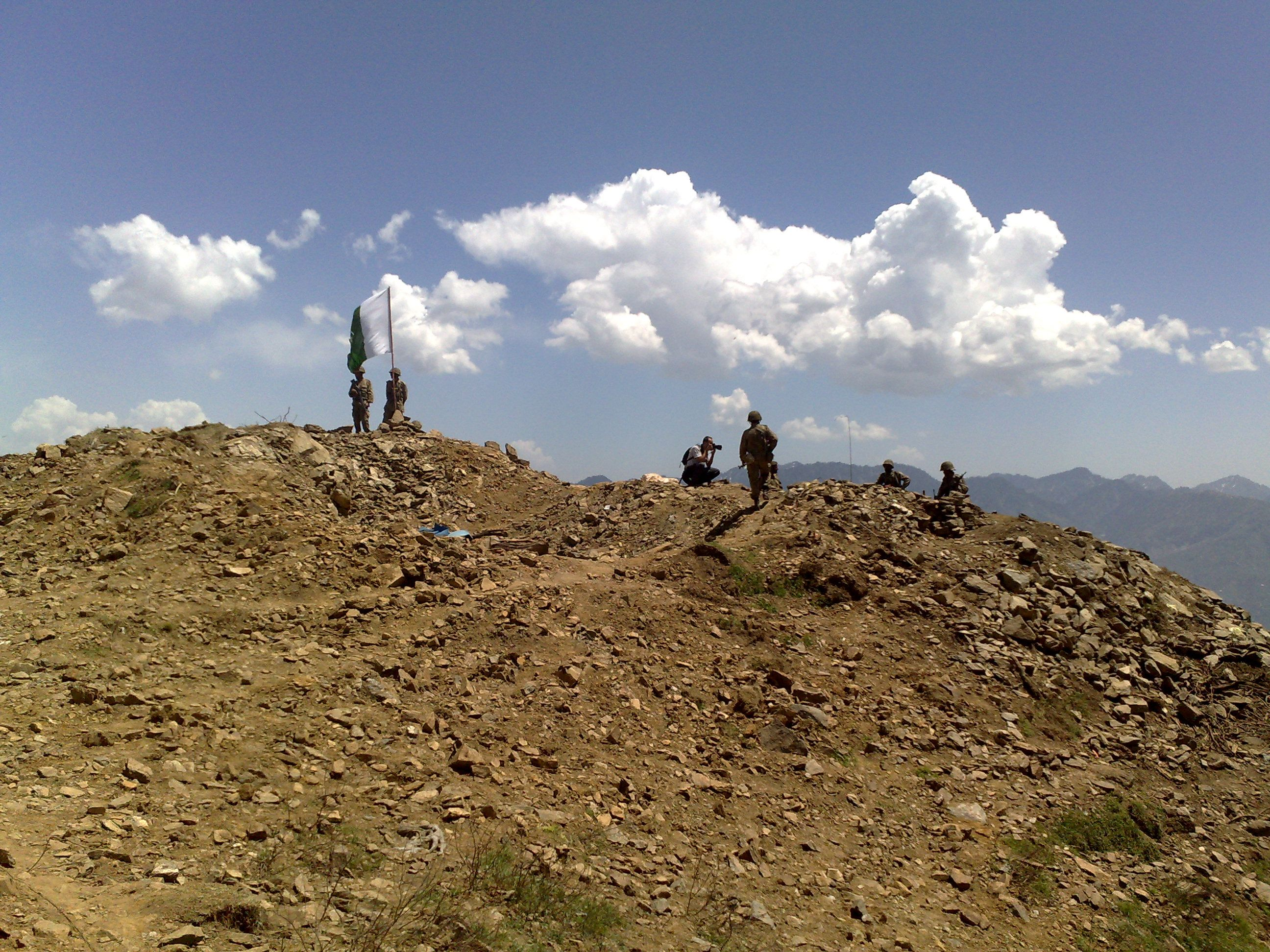
The airborne troops standing at the end of the valley.

Parliamentarian Khawaja Muhammad Asif of Pakistan Muslim League-N held a press conference in the Parliament media lounge, where he warned Afghan President Hamid Karzai. He said that "Karzai became President with the support of Pakistan". He also warned him that Afghanistan should not play with Pakistan's security. After the convincing evidence, Pakistan, along with United States and NATO, found out the significant routes that were using to supply heavy weaponry to Talibans. Pakistan blocked the routes successfully. On 17 May, M.I. learnt that a large numbers of Taliban fighters with a number of foreign fighters, were presented in Khyber Pass, and possibly, were planning to re-take the Swat from the Army.

On 20 May 2009, in Khyber Pass, Pakistan Army sent small teams of Special Service Group (SSG) Commandos, along with small teams of Army Rangers's Ninth Wing Company. As the teams progressed, the Pakistani commandos had confronted a large numbers of foreign fighters with a full-backing support of Taliban militant fighters. The battle was day long and intense fighting ensued. The Black Storks Commandos (Special Service Group) and Ranger's Ninth Wing Company, killed a large number of Taliban and foreign fighters and Taliban leadership had repeatedly suffered heavy human casualties as well as losing a large number of their fighters.

The various media reports stated that foreign fighters were Uzbek and Tajik nationals. Pakistani Commandos also recovered a large amount of weaponry in trucks. During the battle, Pakistani special forces also successfully secured NATO's supply-line trucks that were constantly targeted by the Taliban fighters. After a day long battle, Taliban began to flee from the area at night, but while trying to escape, the SSG and the Ranger teams had intercepted their hiding locations. An ambush led by the Pakistani special forces, the SSG and Ranger's Ninth Wing Company, killed large number of the remaining Taliban fighters. After weeks of heavy fighting, the Taliban had suffered heavy losses and lost many key leaders and territories in Swat and Khyber Pass. The final battle concluded as Pakistan Army as victorious and eliminating the major Taliban leadership from the war theater.

== See also ==
- Insurgency in Khyber Pakhtunkhwa
- Operation Zarb-e-Azb
- Operation Rah-e-Nijat
- Operation Rah-e-Rast
- Operation Swift Retort
- War on terror
