= Masood Aslam =

Pakistani general (born 1952)

Lieutenant General Muhammad Masood Aslam
- محمد مسعود اسلم

Ambassador of Pakistan to Mexico
- In office June 2011 – July 2013

Colonel Commandant Punjab Regiment
- In office 16 March 2008 – April 2010

Corps Commander Peshawar
- In office 15 April 2007 – April 2010
Preceding Commands
IG Training & Evaluation
In office
2005 – 14 April 2007
Director General
National Accountability Bureau (Punjab)
In office
2003–2005
GOC 23rd Infantry Division, Jhelum
In office
2001–2003

Personal details
- Born: 1 September 1952 (age 73) Mujahidabad, Jhelum District, Dominion of Pakistan
- Children: 3, (including Hashim Masood)
- Education: Presentation Convent School, Jhelum; Government High School Jhelum; Pakistan Military Academy; Cadet College Hasan Abdal; Quaid-i-Azam University (MA); National Defence University, Pakistan; United Nations peacekeeping course in Sweden; Command and Staff College Quetta; Pakistan Naval War College; Asia-Pacific Center for Security Studies

Military service
- Allegiance: Pakistan
- Branch/service: Pakistan Army
- Years of service: 1971–2010
- Rank: Lieutenant General
- Unit: 4, 39 & 54 Punjab Regiment
- Commands: Punjab Regiment (Pakistan); XI Corps; Training & Evaluation; NAB Punjab; 23rd Infantry Division
- Battles/wars: Indo-Pakistani War of 1971; Siachen War; Kargil War; War in North-West Pakistan; First Battle of Swat; Battle of Mirali; Battle of Bajaur; Operation Zalzala; Operation Black Thunderstorm; Operation Rah-e-Rast; Mohmand Offensive; Operation Rah-e-Nijat
- Awards: Hilal-e-Imtiaz (Civilian); Hilal-e-Imtiaz (Military); Sitara-e-Jurat; Imtiazi Sanad

Muhammad Masood Aslam HI (C) HI (M) SJ Imtiazi Sanad AFWC PSC (Urdu: محمد مسعود اسلم; born 1 September 1952) is a retired three-star general who served in the Pakistan Army for 39 years. His last post in the Army was serving as the commander of the XI Corps, fighting TTP forces in the North-West Pakistan region from 2007 to 2010. He also held the post of Colonel commandant of the Punjab Regiment from March 2008 to April 2010. Masood played a key role in the management of crucial operations against the Tehrik-i-Taliban, including directing and commanding the First Battle of Swat, operations Zalzala, Sherdil, Rah-e-Rast and Rah-e-Nijat.

== Early life ==
Muhammad Masood Aslam was born on 1 September 1952 in Mujahidabad, Jhelum in Northern Punjab (Pakistan).

=== Education ===
He received his early education from Presentation Convent School, Jhelum and Government High School Jhelum. By the year 1965, he joined Cadet College Hasan Abdal and did his intermediate in pre engineering in 1970 with honours from the same college. However instead of pursuing a career in engineering, he decided to enlist as an Army officer and joined the Pakistan Military Academy in 1970.

== Personal life ==
Masood is married having a family consisting of two daughters and one son. On 4 December 2009 his only son, 20 year old Hashim Masood Aslam, a student at the College of Electrical and Mechanical Engineering in Rawalpindi was a victim of the 2009 Parade Lane Mosque attack which happened during Friday prayer.

== Military career ==
He was selected into the 47th course of the Pakistan Military Academy which was completed early due to the Indo-Pak War of 1971 and was commissioned in the 4th Battalion of the Punjab Regiment on 14 November 1971.

=== 1971 War ===
Within a few weeks of commission, he was seriously wounded fighting on the front lines at the Chumb-Jaurian sector. He was awarded the Imtiazi Sanad (mentioned in despatches) and the 'Gold Wound Stripe' for his efforts and gallantry.

He was among the pioneers who established the computer branch at the GHQ in the early 1970s.

=== Military schooling ===
He has a Master's degree in War studies from Quaid-i-Azam University, attended the Pakistan Naval War College, completed the Command and Staff College (Quetta) Course, Armed Forces War Course from the National Defence College, UN Peace Keeping Course in Sweden, and a Security studies course at the Asia-Pacific Center for Security Studies in Hawaii.

=== Military and Command Assignments ===
During the 1987-88 Siachen Conflict he was stationed at a towering elevation of 20,000 feet, establishing military posts. He later commanded an infantry battalion in Okara, Pakistan as a Lieutenant Colonel and then commanded two infantry brigades as a Brigadier one of which was in Minimarg, Gilgit-Baltistan. During the 1999 Kargil War, he was awarded the Sitara-i-Jurat for his efforts and bravery by President Rafiq Tarar.

From 2001 to 2002, he commanded the 23rd Infantry Division in Jhelum, then served as the Director General of National Accountability Bureau (Punjab Division).

He was promoted to LTG in 2005 and was appointed as Inspector General Training and Evaluation.

== Corps Commander Peshawar ==
Masood took over as Commander in 2007, replacing LTG Muhammad Hamid Khan. During his tenure, the Pakistan Army launched the military operation against the vigilantes of Lal Masjid in Islamabad, that followed a rise in terrorist attacks across the country, mostly from Waziristan and the surrounding FATA regions. Under Masood's leadership, the Corps defeated militants in the Malakand Division and inflicted heavy losses on TTP fighters in the Bajaur, Mohmand, and Khyber tribal agencies and Frontier Regions.

He led the First Battle of Swat and the Battle of Bajaur against the TTP, Operation Zalzala in South Waziristan, Operation Black Thunderstorm in Buner, Lower Dir, Swat, and Shangla districts, Operation Rah-e-Rast in Swat, Mohmand Offensive in Mohmand District, and Operation Rah-e-Nijat in South Waziristan against TTP and its allies.

=== Extension ===
He was scheduled to retire in October 2009 but was the first of three generals given an extension in tenure by Chief of Army Staff Ashfaq Parvez Kayani.

=== Other honors ===
He became the President of the Frontier Golf Association in October 2008.

Masood was awarded Imtiazi Sanad for gallantry in the 1971 War against India in the Chamb Sector and a Golden Wound Stripe when he was critically wounded while leading an attack as a platoon commander across Tawi River near Pallanwala.

In 1999, as a Brigade Commander in the Kargil Crisis, he was awarded Sitara-e-Jurat (SJ) for exceptional leadership and Gallantry.

In 2005, He was awarded Hilal-e-Imtiaz (Military) for his meritorious services.

And in 2010, Lt Gen Masood was awarded Hilal-e-Imtiaz (Civilian) for his contribution towards bringing peace in Swat Region.

== Later work ==
=== Memorial trust established ===
In January 2010, Masood established the Shaheed Hashim Masood Memorial Trust, in honour of his son who was a victim of the 2009 Parade Lane Mosque attack. The trust registered with the Government of Pakistan in the same month.

The first donor gathering for the trust was held on 12 December 2010, wherein Masood stated that the goals of the trust are to provide employment, education, entrepreneurial opportunities, and humanitarian assistance for the 2010 Pakistan Flood affected people in Khyber Pakhtunkhwa.

=== Diplomatic career ===
He was posted as Pakistan Ambassador to Mexico in June 2011 until July 2013.

== TV appearances ==
On 9 December 2021, he gave an interview to Arshad Sharif about the Indo-Pakistani War of 1971.

== Dates of promotion ==
| Insignia | Rank | Date |
|---|---|---|
| | Lieutenant General | November 2005 |
| | Major General | January 2000 |
| | Brigadier | July 1995 |
| | Colonel | Promoted to Brigadier |
| | Lieutenant Colonel | August 1988 |
| | Major | July 1977 |
| | Captain | June 1973 |
| | Lieutenant | January 1972 |
| | Second Lieutenant | November 1971 |

== Awards and decorations ==
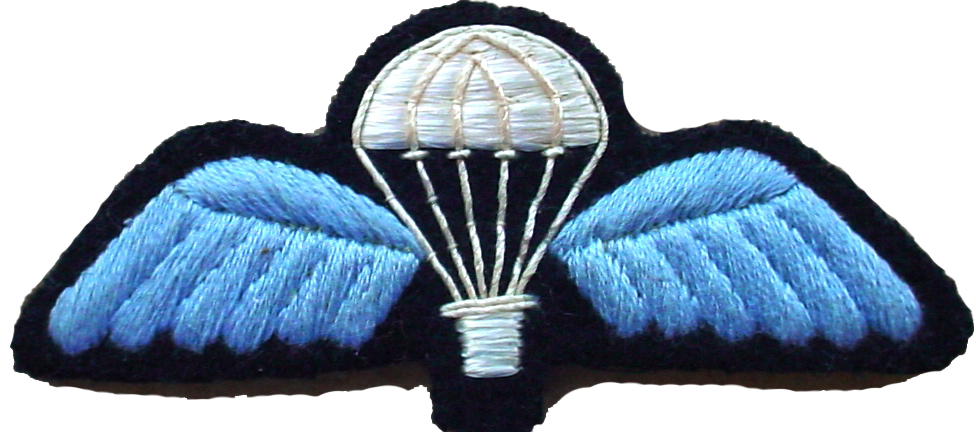

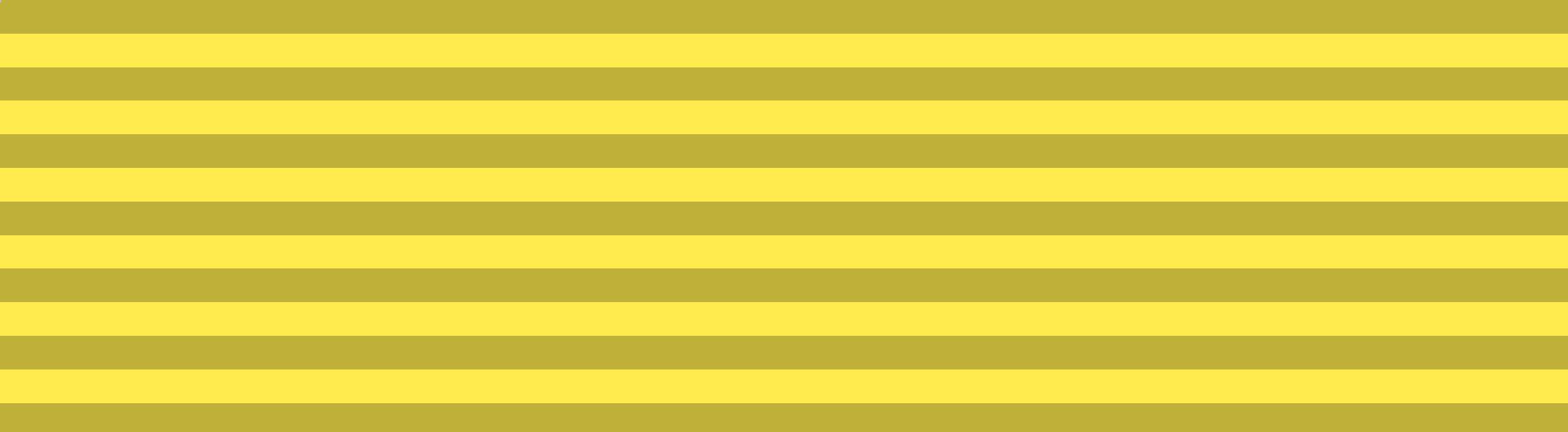

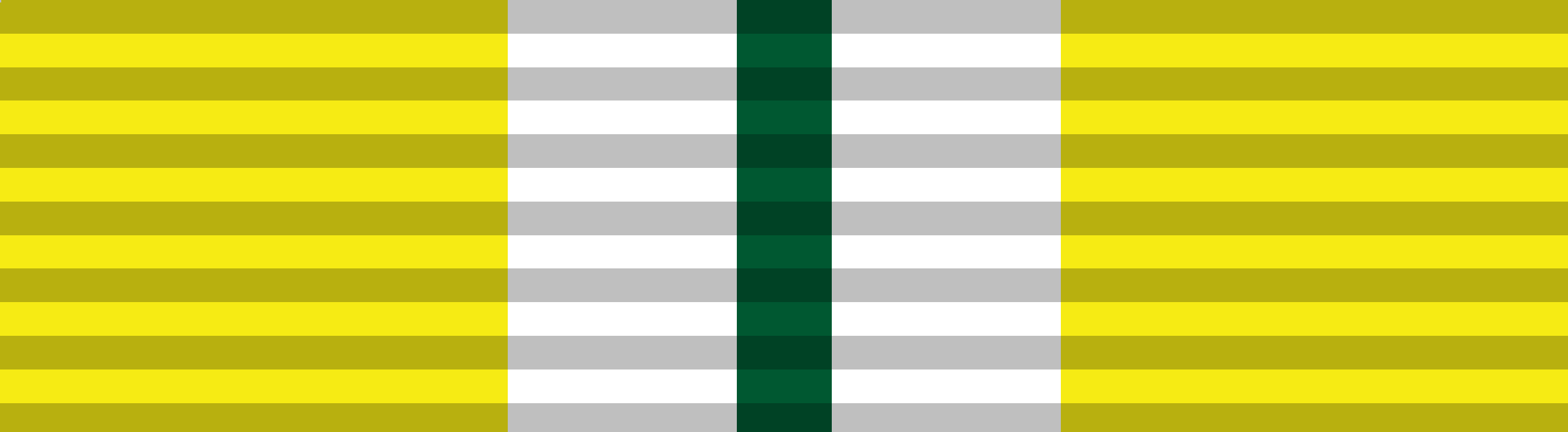
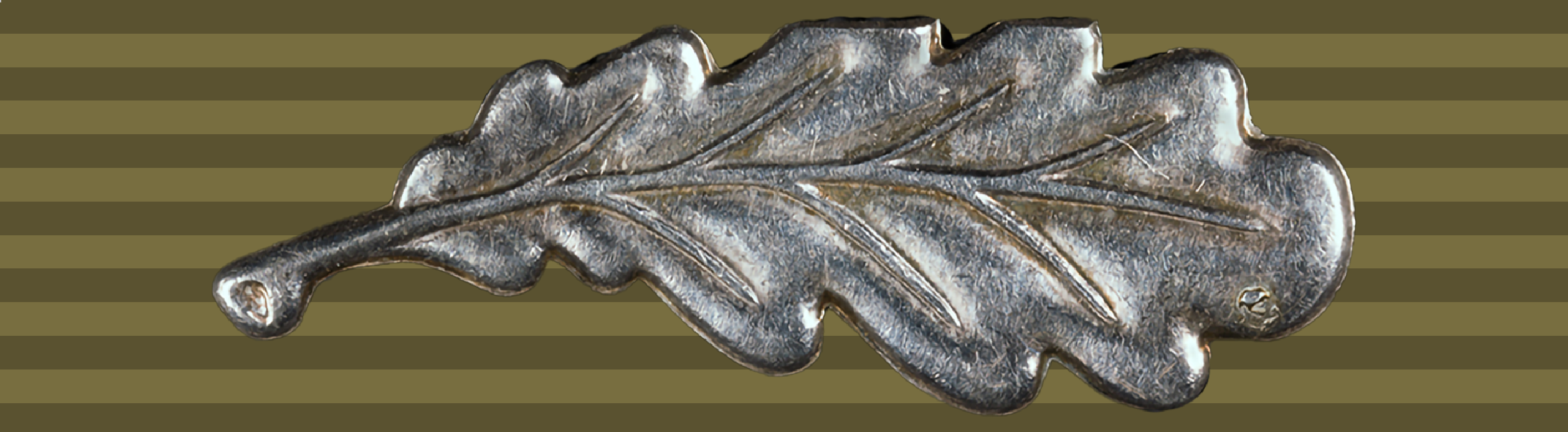

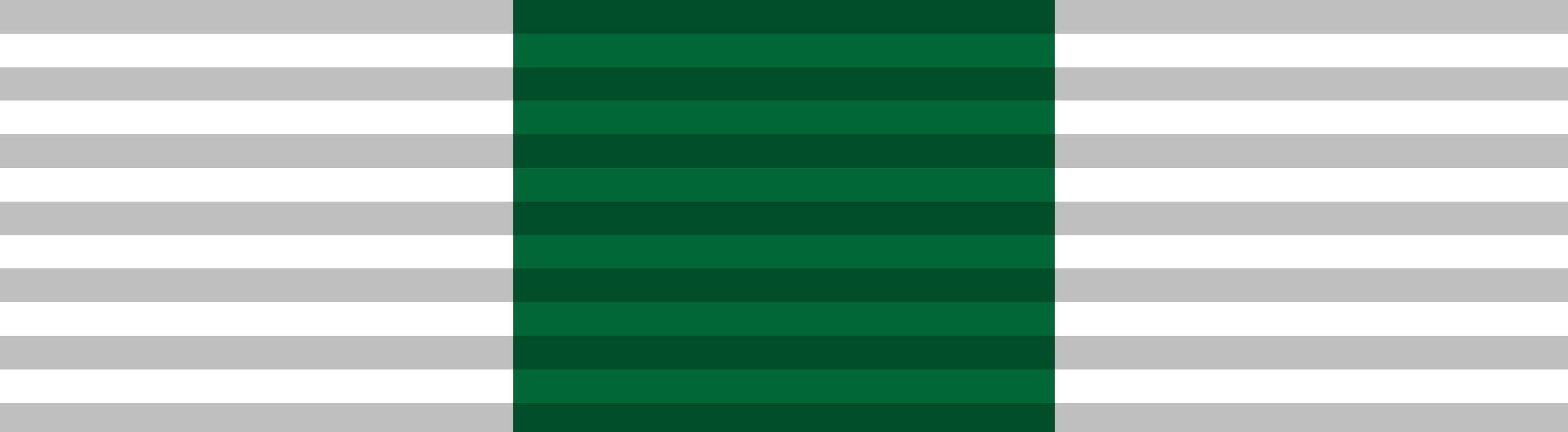

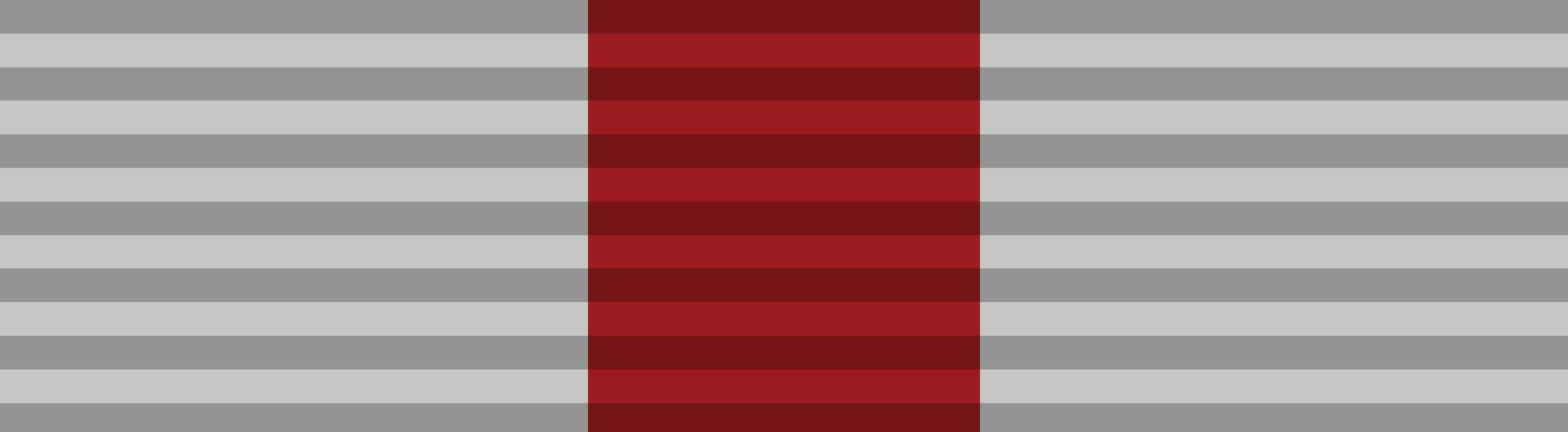

Parachutist Badge
Gold Wound Stripe
| Hilal-e-Imtiaz (Civilian) (Crescent of Excellence) 2010 | Hilal-e-Imtiaz (Military) (Crescent of Excellence) 2005 | | Imtiazi Sanad |
| Sitara-e-Jurat (Star of Courage) 1999 | Tamgha-e-Diffa (General Service Medal) Siachen Glacier Clasp | Sitara-e-Harb 1971 War (War Star 1971) | Tamgha-e-Jang 1971 War (War Medal 1971) |
| Tamgha-e-Baqa (Nuclear Test Medal) 1998 | Tamgha-e-Istaqlal Pakistan (Escalation with India Medal) 2002 | 10 Years Service Medal | 20 Years Service Medal |
| 30 Years Service Medal | 35 Years Service Medal | Tamgha-e-Sad Saala Jashan-e- Wiladat-e-Quaid-e-Azam (100th Birth Anniversary of Muhammad Ali Jinnah) 1976 | Hijri Tamgha (Hijri Medal) 1979 |
| Jamhuriat Tamgha (Democracy Medal) 1988 | Qarardad-e-Pakistan Tamgha (Resolution Day Golden Jubilee Medal) 1990 | Tamgha-e-Salgirah Pakistan (Independence Day Golden Jubilee Medal) 1997 | Command and Staff College Quetta Centenary Student's Medal (2007) |

Military offices
| Preceded by Mohammad Hamid Khan | Corps Commander Peshawar | Succeeded by Asif Yasin Malik |
