= 2009 internal displacement crisis in Pakistan =

The 2009 refugee crisis in Pakistan was the massive displacement of civilians in the Khyber Pakhtunkhwa of Pakistan that was caused by Operation Black Thunderstorm.

Since the beginning of Operation Black Thunderstorm against the Taliban, over 1.2 million people have been displaced in across Pakistan's Khyber Pakhtunkhwa, joined by a further 555,000 Pakistanis uprooted by fighting since August 2008. The refugees are known in Pakistan as Internally Displaced Persons (IDPs).

Most of the 1.2 million people who have escaped the violence were staying with relatives or friends, placing tremendous strain on the country, while over 300,000 others are seeking refuge in UNHCR-supported camps.

By 22, August 1.6 million of 2.2 million returned home, as per UN estimates.

== Background ==
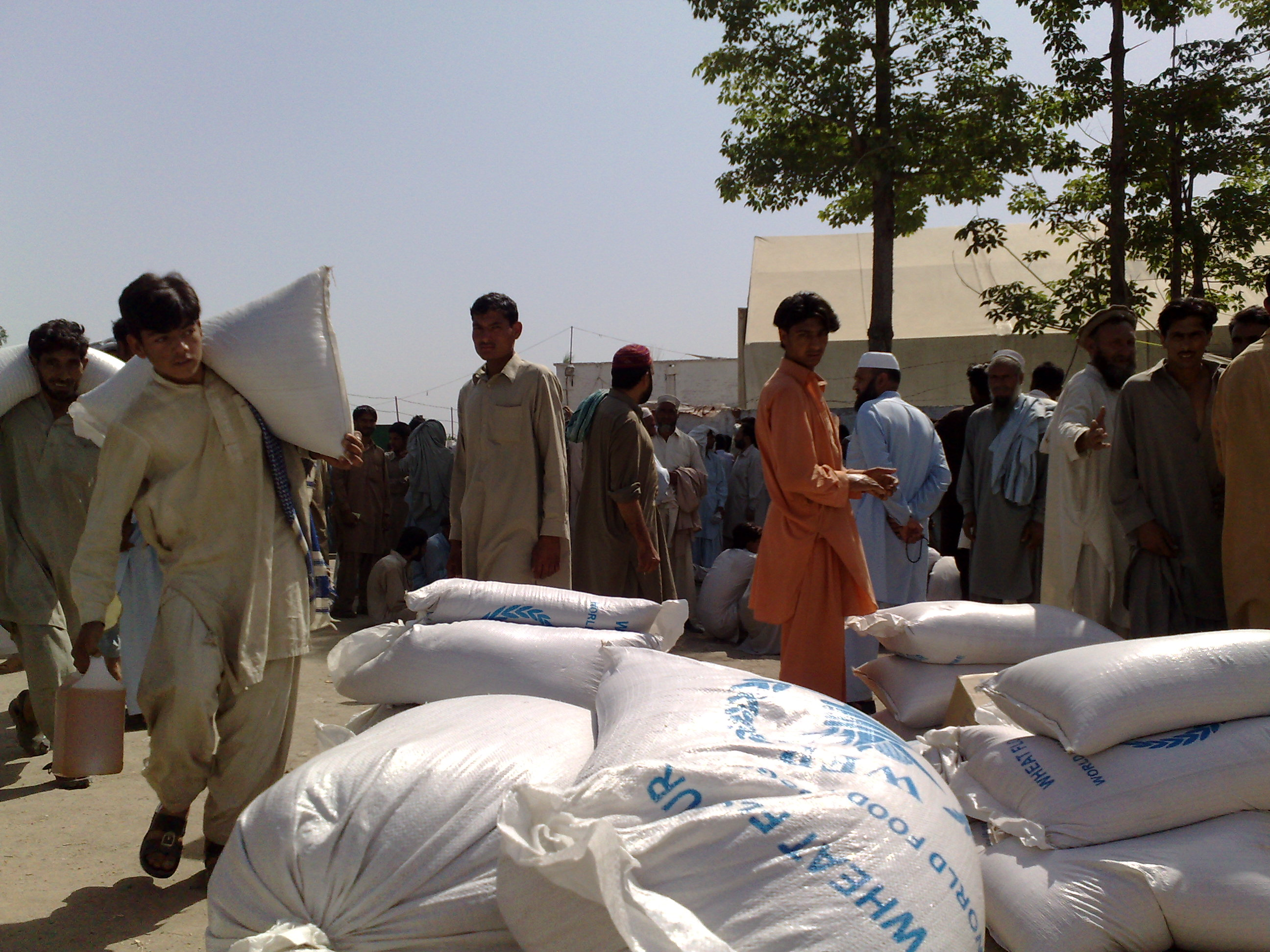
Ration distribution point

UNICEF was responsible to provide WASH facilities at camp level. In this regard they have selected IDP's to fulfill their works in camps e.g., SSD, IRSP, HRDS, HDOD, RID and many other.

== Special Support Group (IDPs) ==
In order to give full support to the government of Khyber Pakhtunkhwa to manage and arrange all the matters pertaining to Internally Displaced Persons (IDPs), Special Support Group (IDPs) was formed at the federal level. Special Support Group (IDPs) has been helping the provincial government to arrange:

- Registration
- Medical Cover
- Camp Management
- Distribution of relief goods

For more information Special Support Group (IDPs)

== International response ==
Country	Response
China	People's Republic of China's Ambassador to Pakistan Luo Zhao Hui had called on Prime Minister Yousuf Raza Gilani in Islamabad on Saturday and presented him a cheque of $1 million for refugees. Pakistan's Ambassador to China Masood Khan said that China's total contribution for assistance to the IDPs had now reached $5.4 million.

=== Non-state entities ===
Organization	Response
United Nations	The United Nations made an international appeal for Pakistan IDPs and has so far received one-third of the $150 million it has sought. The UN agencies have provided for 780,000 IDPs as they expand their relief operations.

== Effects ==
The fighting since August has so far left up to 2 million displaced.

=== Weather conditions ===
The federal government was considering shifting the internally displaced persons (IDPs) from the refugee camps set up in Mardan, Nowshera, Swabi and other hot areas of NWFP to Abbottabad and Mansehra districts, as they are reportedly not acclimatised to hot weather. but due to negligence of federal government, it wasn't made a reality.

Managing Director Zumurrad Khan of the Pakistan Baitul Maal said that scorching heat in Mardan and other areas of Khyber Pakhtunkhwa was unbearable for the IDPs of Swat and Malakand Division.

== See also ==
- Operation Black Thunderstorm
- Operation Rah-e-Rast
- Insurgency in Khyber Pakhtunkhwa
