= Kanju =

Village in Khyber Pakhtunkhwa, Pakistan

- village
- Interactive map of Kanju
- Coordinates: 34°48′0″N 72°21′0″E
- Country PAKISTAN: Pakistan
- Province: Khyber Pakhtunkhwa
- District: Swat District

Kanju is a village situated on the bank of the River Swat in Swat District, Khyber Pakhtunkhwa, Pakistan.

== Location ==
It is 3 kilometres away from Mingora, the main city of Swat District, and about 5 kilometres from Saidu Sharif, the district's capital. It is situated on the bank of the River Swat. It is the first entry point to Nekpekhail (Nek Bi Khel) area.

== Agriculture ==
The major source of earning is agriculture and fruit farming. The peaches of Kanju and overall Swat are known all over Pakistan. Kanju contributes heavily in farming by producing a large amount of local rice called "Begamai". A considerable number of people own small and large businesses in various places of Khyber Pakhtunkhwa.

== Education ==
Kanju is home to a number of government colleges, including Government High School for boys, Government Middle School for girls and several Government Primary Schools for boys and girls. There are a number of public and private schools and colleges: Al-Razi Public School and College, Hira School and College, Iqra School and College, Shah Public School and College Muslim Hands Public School, Islamia Public School, Continental Public School, Bolan Education Academy, Town Public School, Kanju public School and several modern schools like Eurasian, Al-Qalam and Nexus schools. There is also a technical college Indus Polytechnic Institute.

== Saidu Sharif Airport ==
Saidu Sharif Airport is situated between Kanju and Dherai.

== Tourist attractions ==
There are views of the River Swat from Ayub Bridge in Kanju. The township and sham baba [the son of mahmood ghaznavi) is a famous martyr, his date of martyring is 413 hijri. Saidu Sharif Airport is a small airport mainly used for domestic flights. There are many travel agencies here.

== Residential scheme ==
Kanju Township is a residential scheme undertaken by the SDDA. It consists of two phases. Phase one is ready while phase two is in the making. Phase one consists of sectors from A to E. Plots in sector one are more costly.
