= Sher Muhammad Qusab =

Pakistani militant leader (died 2009)

Sher Muhammad Qusab (died 20 September 2009), also called "the Official Butcher of Swat", was a leader of the Tehrik-i-Taliban Pakistan during the War in North-West Pakistan. He had a bounty of 10 million rupees ($120,000) on his head, and was known for killing civilians and policemen on video. He was captured during the Second Battle of Swat but died of his wounds.

According to leading columnist Nadeem F. Paracha, he may or may not be related to the Mumbai bomber Ajmal Qusab. He claimed that "...there have been three (in) famous Kasabs in Pakistan - and all of them religious crackpots!" and believed that it was a meaningful concurrent that they shared the same last name (although it has yet to be dismissed as a coincidence).
