= Haroon Aslam =

Pakistani general

Lieutenant General Muhammad Haroon Aslam HI(M) SBt
- محمد هارون اسلم
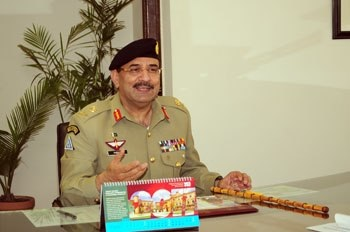
- Military career
- Allegiance: Pakistan
- Branch: Pakistan Army
- Service years: 1975-2013
- Rank: Lieutenant General
- Unit: 35 Azad Kashmir Regiment
- Commands: Special Services Group; Pakistan Rangers; Chief of Logistics Staff (CLS); Commander XXXI Corps; Managing Director Fauji Foundation
- Conflicts: Operation Rah-e-Rast; Operation Black Thunderstorm
- Awards: Hilal-i-Imtiaz; Sitara-i-Basalat

Muhammad Haroon Aslam HI(M) SBt (Urdu: محمد ہارون اسلم) is a retired 3-Star general of Pakistan Army. He was the Chief of Logistics Staff (CLS), of Pakistan Army.

== Education ==
He holds master's degrees in Defence Studies and Political Science. Haroon Aslam is a graduate of Command and Staff College Quetta, Defence Services Command and Staff College (Bangladesh) and National Defence University Islamabad.

== Commands held ==
In the past he served as Director Military Operations, commanded Pakistan Army's (Special Service Group). He also served as Corps Commander Bahawalpur from Mar 2011 to Jan 2013.

In Swat he led Operation Rah-e-Rast. Under his command the SSG, during Operation Black Thunderstorm, liberated the Piochar Valley in Swat, which was occupied by terrorists. He was due to retire on 9 April 2014 but he retired on 27 November 2013 when Lt Gen Raheel Sharif was appointed as COAS.

Later he served as chairman Board Human Resource & Remuneration Committee & Board of Director (Askari Bank), managing director of Fauji Foundation, CE & MD of Fauji Fertilizer Bin Qasim Limited Fauji Foods Ltd (formerly Noon Pakistan Ltd), Fauji Meat Ltd, FFBL Coal Power Company Ltd.

== Awards and decorations ==

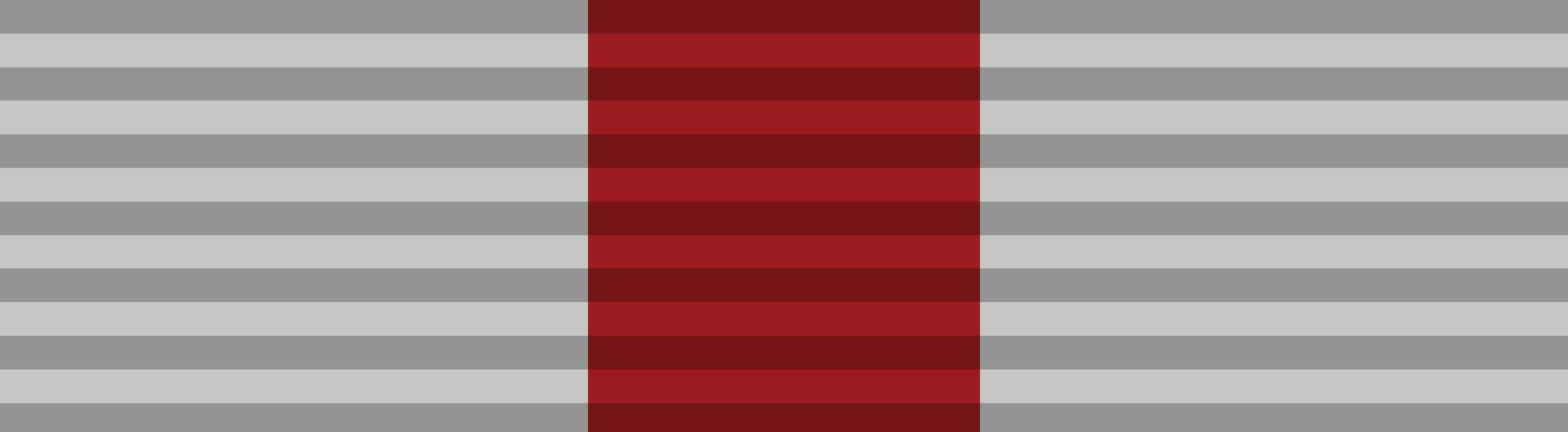

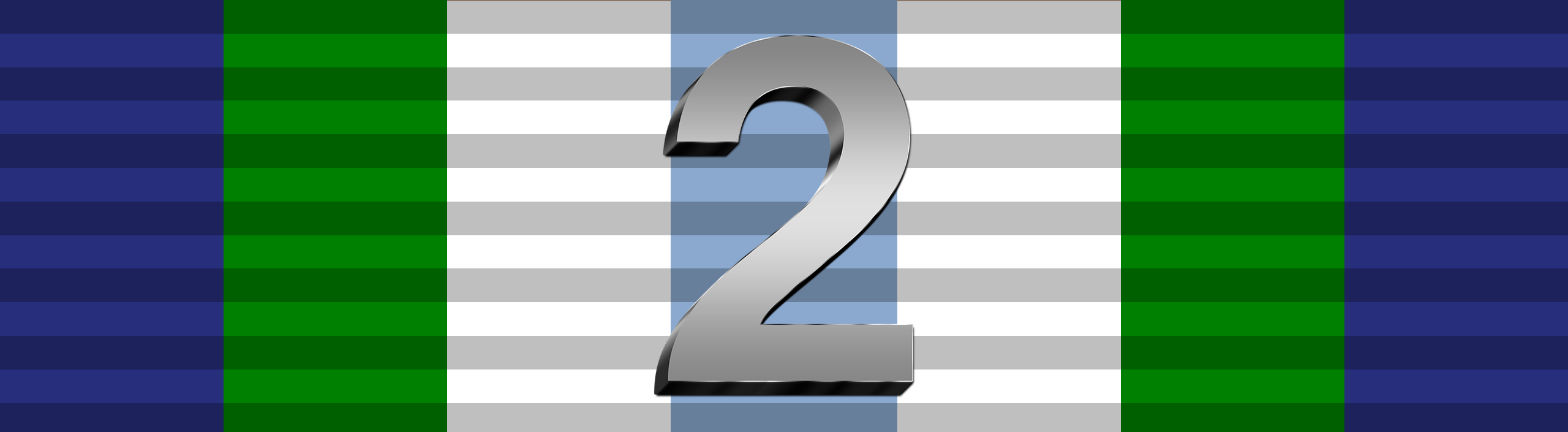

Hilal-e-Imtiaz (Military) (Crescent of Excellence)	Sitara-e-Basalat (Star of Good Conduct)	Tamgha-e-Diffa (General Service Medal) Siachen Glacier Clasp	Tamgha-e-Baqa (Nuclear Test Medal) 1998
Tamgha-e-Istaqlal Pakistan (Escalation with India Medal) 2002	10 Years Service Medal	20 Years Service Medal	30 Years Service Medal
35 Years Service Medal	Tamgha-e-Sad Saala Jashan-e- Wiladat-e-Quaid-e-Azam (100th Birth Anniversary of Muhammad Ali Jinnah) 1976	Hijri Tamgha (Hijri Medal) 1979	Jamhuriat Tamgha (Democracy Medal) 1988
Qarardad-e-Pakistan Tamgha (Resolution Day Golden Jubilee Medal) 1990	Tamgha-e-Salgirah Pakistan (Independence Day Golden Jubilee Medal) 1997	Command and Staff College Quetta Student's Medal	United Nations UNOMIG Medal (2 Deployments)

=== Foreign decorations ===
Foreign Awards
United Nations	UNOMIG Medal
