= Government High School Jhelum =

Secondary school in Pakistan

Government High School Jhelum is an education institute of Jhelum District, Punjab, Pakistan.

== History ==
School is one of oldest educational institution in the Jhelum District as it was established in early 1930s. School has honor to produce many renowned student. Former Indian Prime Minister Inder Kumar Gujral had also studied at the school for sometime. Lt Gen Masood Aslam, Former Corps Commander Peshawar and now Ambassador of Pakistan in Mexico and Rear Admiral Muhammad Shafique, Former Deputy President National Defence University Islamabad (2021-2023); and the maiden Naval & Air Attache of Pakistan in Berlin Germany (2008-2011) are also Alumni of the school. The school is owned by the Education Department Government of the Punjab, and also affiliated with Rawalpindi Board of Intermediate and Secondary Education.

== Notable alumni ==
- Inder Kumar Gujral
- Lt Gen Masood Aslam
- Rear Admiral Muhammad Shafique
