= Hayatullah (Tehreek-e-Taliban leader) =

Pakistani Tehreek-e-Taliban leader

- Other names: Humayun; Hayatullah Hamyo
- Known for: Commanded Tehreek-e-Taliban forces in the Swat Valley

Hayatullah is a citizen of Pakistan who has been reported to be a leader of the militant group Tehreek-e-Taliban. According to Pakistan's Daily Times he was reported to have been the group's commander for the Swat valley. He was reported to have been tied to Maulvi Fazlullah. The Sindh police's Special Investigations unit reported he had been captured in a raid in Balong Goth in Orangi Town on 12 January 2010.

United Press International reports he works in the telecommunications sector.
