= Saidu Sharif Airport =

Airport in Pakistan

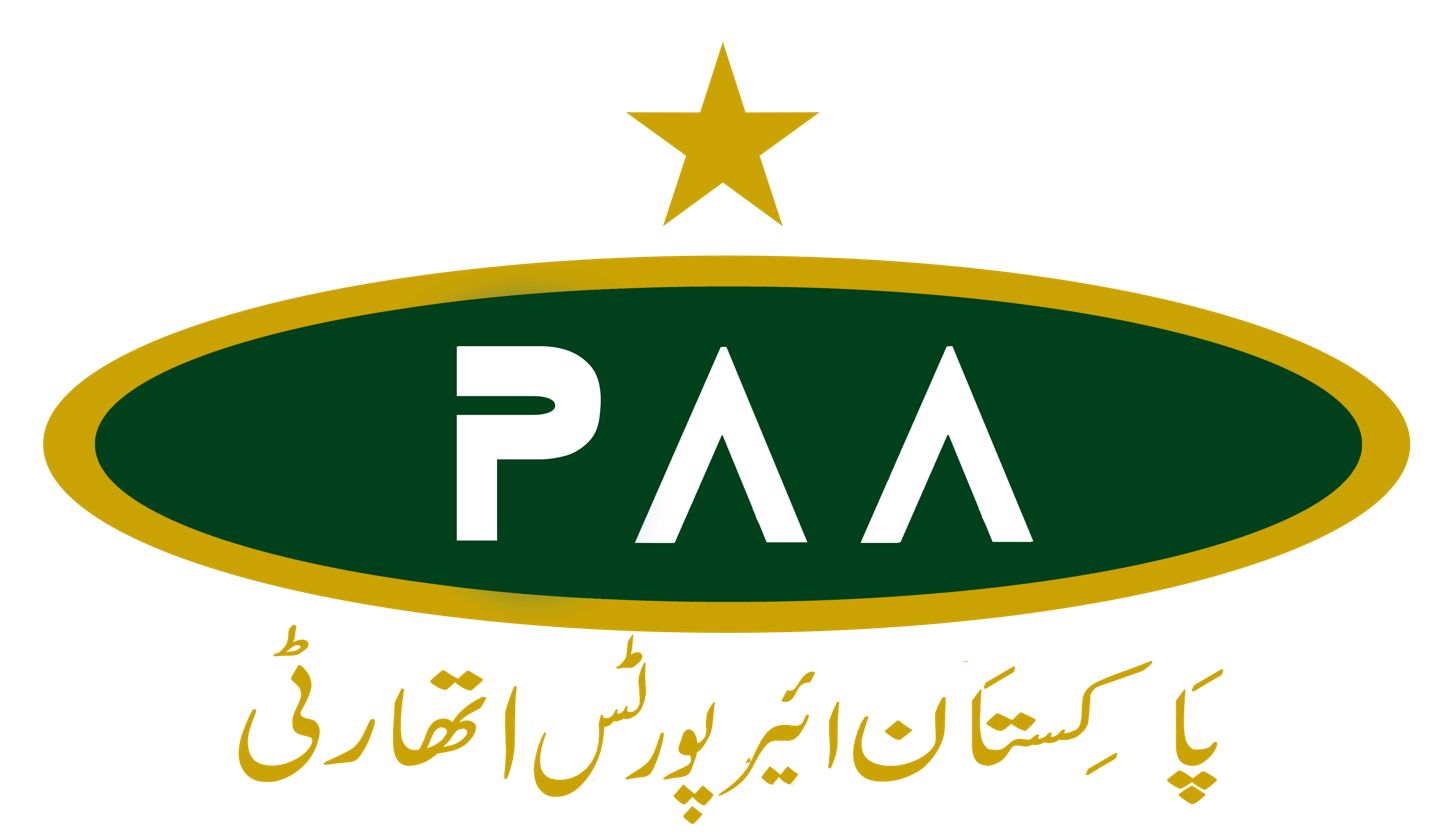
Saidu Sharif Airport سیدو شریف ہوائی اڈہ
- IATA: SDT; ICAO: OPSS

Summary
- Airport type: Joint-use airport
- Owner: GoP Aviation Division
- Operator: Pakistan Airports Authority
- Serves: Saidu Sharif
- Location: Kabal, Swat District, Khyber Pakhtunkhwa, Pakistan
- Built: 1978
- Elevation AMSL: 3,183 ft / 970 m
- Coordinates: 34°48′47″N 72°21′07″E
- Website: paa.gov.pk
- Interactive map of Saidu Sharif Airport

Runways
Direction	Length		Surface
Direction	ft	m	Surface
05/23	6,000	1,829	Bitumen
- Sources: PAA AIP

Saidu Sharif Airport (IATA: SDT, ICAO: OPSS) in Pakistan is situated near the Swat River and between the villages of Dherai and Kanju in Khyber Pakhtunkhwa.

== History ==
The airport was built in 1978, and two daily flights were available to Peshawar and Islamabad before the airport was shut down during the First Battle of Swat in 2007. There were hopes of reopening the airport in 2012. However, this reopening was repeatedly delayed due to the security situation. Nevertheless, after a hiatus of 17 years, the flight operation at the airport resumed in March 2021.

Visitors traveling to Swat Valley and the Malam Jabba ski resort during the summer season use this airport to reach Swat District.

=== 2025 India-Pakistan conflict ===
During the 2025 India-Pakistan conflict, the Pakistan Air Force activated the Saidu Sharif Airport as an FOB.

== See also ==
- Airlines of Pakistan
- List of airports in Pakistan
- Malam Jabba
- Pakistan Civil Aviation Authority
- Swat
- Transport in Pakistan
