= Kuzcham Dherai =

Administrative unit

Dherai is a village and union council of Kabal Tehsil, Swat District, Khyber Pakhtunkhwa, Pakistan.

Dherai is located near Saidu Sharif Airport. Dherai is divided into two parts: Barcham and Kuzcham. People of Dherai largely belong Yousafzai tribe, one of the largest Pashtun tribe.

== Business ==
The majority of the population is engaged in agriculture. Other people own businesses in downtown Dherai, which is called Dherai Chawak.
