= Muslim Khan (Taliban spokesman) =

Muslim Khan مسلم خان
- Born: 1954; Kabal NWFP, Pakistan
- Died: 2017 (aged 70-71)
- Allegiance: Tehrik-i-Taliban Pakistan
- Conflicts: War in North-West Pakistan; Battle of Swat; First Battle of Swat; Second Battle of Swat (POW) (executed)

Muslim Khan (1954 - 2017) was a captured Pakistani militant and former spokesman for the Tehrik-i-Taliban Pakistan chapter based in Swat and became the chief spokesman of the Swat Taliban in 2007.

== Early life and education ==
Born in Kabal Tehsil, Swat, in 1954 Khan started out as a student activist of a left-wing secular party in the 1960s, but became a religious extremist in the early 1990s, becoming a part of Tehreek-e-Nafaz-e-Shariat-e-Mohammadi's leadership in 1994.

In an interview with New England Foundation for the Arts, when asked about his usage of American-styled English and pronunciation, he revealed that he had lived for some time in Boston, Massachusetts. He had spent 4 years in the USA and worked as a painter in Boston. The BBC reported that Khan spoke Pashto, Urdu, English, Arabic and Persian, and had lived in or travelled across more than a dozen countries in the Middle East, Europe, the US and Asia.

== Militant activities ==
In April 2009 he denounced any Pakistanis who disagreed with his interpretation of Islam calling them non-Muslims. It was also revealed due to a telephone intercept that Khan had urged attacks on the families of soldiers. "Strikes should be carried out on their homes so their kids get killed and then they'll realise". Before the start of the Army offensive against the Taliban, Khan claimed that his fighters controlled "more than 90 per cent" of Swat.

After the 2009 operation in Swat he was still at large, vowing that his men will step up attacks.

== Arrest ==
He was arrested on 10 September by the security forces of Pakistan in the suburbs of Mingora.

He was one of eight men sentenced to death by a military court on 28 December 2016 for terrorism and other offences. Khan's appeal before the Peshawar High Court was weakened following the Supreme Court's decision in Said Zaman Khan v. Federation of Pakistan. His sentence was briefly stayed by the High Court on 24 May 2017, on the basis of a petition filed by his wife, but he was eventually executed.
