= Sufi Muhammad =

Pakistani cleric and leader of the Islamist TNSM (1933–2019)

Sufi Muhammad صوفی محمد

Founder and 1st Emir of Tehreek-e-Nafaz-e-Shariat-e-Mohammadi
- In office 1992–2002
- Succeeded by: Fazlullah (militant leader)

Personal life
- Born: 1933 Maidan, Dir, British India
- Died: 11 July 2019 (aged 86) Swat, Khyber Pakhtunkhwa, Pakistan
- Children: At least one daughter
- Known for: Being a cleric, and militant

Religious life
- Religion: Islam
- Denomination: Sunni
- Creed: Atharī
- Movement: Salafism; Wahhabism
- Military career
- Allegiance: Jamaat (1980s–1992); TNSM (1992–2002)
- Service years: 1980s–2002
- Rank: Emir (TNSM)
- Conflicts: Malakand Division Revolt; War in Afghanistan; Waziristan War (POW)

Sufi Muhammad bin Alhazrat Hassan (Urdu: صوفی محمد بن الحضرت حسن; born 1933 – 11 July 2019) was a Pakistani Sunni Salafi Wahhabi cleric and militant, and the founder of Tehreek-e-Nafaz-e-Shariat-e-Mohammadi (TNSM), a militant group (declared a terrorist outfit and banned in 2002) vying for implementation of his version of Sharia in Pakistan. It operated mainly in the Dir, Swat, and Malakand districts of Khyber Pakhtunkhwa.

Sufi Muhammad was jailed for sending thousands of volunteers to Afghanistan to fight the U.S. intervention in 2001. However, he was freed in 2008 after he renounced violence.

He was the father-in-law of Fazlullah, another militant, who assumed the leadership of TNSM during Sufi's imprisonment.

He was described by BBC as a "follower" of Saudi Arabia's Wahhabi Salafist Islamic school of thought, and by the Jamestown Foundation as one of the "active leaders" of Jamaat-e-Islami in the 1980s.

== Early life ==
Sufi Muhammad, born in 1933 in Maidan, Lower Dir District, and received religious education at Panjpir, Swabi.

His son, Matiul Haq, would become an influential ideologue of Pakistani terrorist group Tehreek-e-Taliban, which would at one time be led by his son-in-law Mullah Fazlullah.

== Career ==
=== Early activities ===
During the 1980s, Sufi Muhammad actively participated in Jamaat-e-Islami, an Islamist political party of Pakistan. In 1992 he split from the group to form TNSM. From its stronghold of Malakand Division districts in northwestern Pakistan, Sufi Muhammad and his group engaged in violent agitation for the enforcement of Sharia law.

=== After 9/11 ===
In October 2001, following the September 11 attacks, Sufi Muhammad crossed into Afghanistan with thousands of his followers to help the Taliban fight the US-led forces. In 2001 he issued an edict, or fatwa, for holy war against U.S.-led forces in Afghanistan. After the Taliban was ousted from power in 2001, he returned to Pakistan, and was arrested.

Sufi Muhammad remained in prison until 2008, when he agreed in talks with the Government of Khyber-Pakhtunkhwa to use his influence to work towards peace in the region.

=== Ceasefire ===
Maulana Sufi Muhammad took part in negotiations with the government that led to the announcement of a temporary ceasefire in the Malakand region on 16 February 2009. The Pakistani government agreed to allow the implementation of Sharia in the region once violence had stopped. He agreed to travel to Swat to discuss peace with Fazlullah and his followers. He told reporters, "We will soon open dialogue with the Taliban. We will ask them to lay down their weapons. We are hopeful that they will not let us down. We will stay here in the [Swat] valley until peace is restored."

In early April 2009, Sufi Muhammad ended support for peace negotiations stating that the government was stalling the implementation of sharia courts in the Swat valley. President Asif Ali Zardari refused to sign any agreement until peace had been restored in the valley but failed to elaborate on how those conditions would be achieved.

However, the president signed the Nizam-e-Adl-Regulation law for Swat, after it was hurriedly pushed through the national Parliament a few hours earlier on 13 April 2009.

On 19 April 2009, Sufi Muhammad declared that "democracy was un-Islamic" and that decisions made in the qazi courts could not be appealed in Pakistan's central judicial system. According to the cleric, Western-style democracy had led to divides among Pakistanis and the judicial system had contributed to the factionalism. He ordered the central government to withdraw all judges from Malakand within four days and to set up a Darul Qaza, an Islamic supreme court, to hear appeals from local Sharia courts.

=== Arrest ===
On 3 June 2009, while engaging in Operation Black Thunderstorm against the Taliban, the Pakistani Army arrested senior aides to Sufi Muhammad in the Amandara region in Lower Dir. Among those aides arrested were Muhammad's deputy, Mohammad Alam, and his spokesperson, Ameer Izzat Khan. Initial reports indicated that Sufi Muhammad himself and possibly two of his sons had also been detained, though government sources would not confirm and would only say they knew of his whereabouts. TNSM sources confirmed that Sufi Muhammad and his sons were missing, but suggested that he had gone into hiding.

On 26 July 2009, the government announced the arrest of the cleric for encouraging violence and terrorism. On 2 August 2009, police announced that he had been charged with sedition, aiding terrorism and conspiracy.

In January 2011, Sufi Muhammad denied to an anti-terrorism court that he had any links to the anti-state Tehreek-i-Taliban Pakistan (TTP) and that he only sought enforcement of sharia in Malakand. He was indicted on sedition charges by an anti-terrorism court on 7 February 2015. He was released on bail on medical grounds in January 2018 by the Peshawar High Court.

== Death ==
Muhammad bin Hassan died from kidney failure and diabetes on 11 July 2019 at the age of 86.

== Writings ==
Some of his writings include:

=== Urdu ===
Haakimiyat Allah Taala Shariat-e Muhammadi kay Aayaynah mayn, 1998.

=== Pashto ===
Wajuhat-e-Arbaa Ashrah li Marifat-e Haqiqat-e al-Shariat-e al-Muhammadiah; Yani Swaarlas Wajuhaat da Pijandalu da Shariat-e-Muhammadi, 2008.
