= Fazlullah Hayat =

Pakistani Taliban leader (1974–2018)

Fazlullah Hayat فضل اللہ حیات

2nd Emir of Tehreek-e-Nafaz-e-Shariat-e-Mohammadi
- In office 12 January 2002 – 14 June 2018
- Preceded by: Sufi Muhammad

3rd Emir of Tehreek-e-Taliban Pakistan
- In office 7 November 2013 – 14 June 2018
- Preceded by: Hakimullah Mehsud
- Succeeded by: Noor Wali Mehsud

Personal details
- Born: c. 1974 Swat District, Khyber Pakhtunkhwa, Pakistan
- Died: 14 June 2018 (aged 43–44) Marawara District, Kunar Province, Afghanistan (present-day Taliban regime)
- Children: Muhammad Hakim, Abdul Basit (deceased)
- Military career
- Allegiance: Tehreek-e-Nafaz-e-Shariat-e-Mohammadi (1992–2018); Tehrik-i-Taliban Pakistan (2007–2018)
- Service years: 1992–2018
- Rank: Emir of the Tehrik-e-Taliban Pakistan and Tehreek-e-Nafaz-e-Shariat-e-Mohammadi
- Conflicts: War in North-West Pakistan; First Battle of Swat; Operation Black Thunderstorm; Operation Zarb-e-Azb; Operation Radd-ul-Fasaad; War in Afghanistan †

Fazlullah Hayat (Note: Pashto: فضل اللہ حیات) (1974 – 15 June 2018) was an Islamist jihadist militant who served as the third emir of Tehreek-e-Taliban Pakistan (TTP) from 2013 until his death in 2018. He was also the leader of the Tehreek-e-Nafaz-e-Shariat-e-Mohammadi. He became the emir of the TTP in 2013, and presided over the descent of the group into factions who are often at conflict with each other.

Fazlullah was designated by the Al-Qaida and Taliban Sanctions Committee of the UN Security Council in 2015, and was added to the U.S. State Department's Rewards for Justice wanted list on 7 March 2018. Fazlullah was killed in June 2018 by a U.S. drone strike in Kunar, Afghanistan.

== Birth and Marriage ==
Fazlullah Hayat was born in 1974 into a Pashtun family in the Swat District of Khyber Pakhtunkhwa, Pakistan. He belonged to the Babakarkhail branch of the Yusufzai clan of Pashtuns.

He married the daughter of Sufi Muhammad, the founder of Tehreek-e-Nafaz-e-Shariat-e-Mohammadi. It is rumoured that Fazlullah kidnapped Sufi Muhammad's daughter as a student in Sufi Muhammad Madrassa. MSNBC, a news channel in the United States, obtained a photo of Fazlullah in January 2008.

== Militant activity ==
=== Operations in Pakistan ===
==== TNSM in Swat ====
On 12 January 2002, Fazlullah became the leader of Tehreek-e-Nafaz-e-Shariat-e-Mohammadi (TNSM) due to the enforcement of a ban by Pervez Musharraf, former President of Pakistan. The ban led to the arrest and capture of Sufi Muhammad, which placed Fazlullah into the leadership role. Sufi Muhammad was freed in 2008 after he renounced violence. Fazlullah managed to restore the organization, bootstrapping on the relief efforts by Islamist extremist groups following the 8 October 2005-earthquake. New cadres then began moving into the Swat Valley.

==== Alliance with Tehrik-e-Taliban Pakistan ====
In the aftermath of the 2007 siege of Lal Masjid, Fazlullah's forces and Baitullah Mehsud's Tehrik-e-Taliban Pakistan (TTP) formed an alliance. Fazlullah and his army henceforth reportedly received orders from Mehsud. A temporary cease-fire from May to September 2007 allowed Fazlullah to consolidate his political forces in Swat.

==== Parallel government ====
With the support of more than 4,500 militants, by late October 2007 Fazlullah had established a "parallel government" in 59 villages in Swat Valley by starting Islamic courts to enforce sharia law.

==== Reports of wounding ====
On 10 July 2009, BBC reported that Fazlullah was near death after being critically wounded, corroborating statements made by senior government and security officials in Pakistan. This was a day after the army announced it had wounded the Taliban chief in the Swat valley. The Taliban have denied that Fazlullah was critically injured. The Pakistan army, however, refuted this claim and insisted that a man impersonated Fazlullah when he allegedly denied that he was critically injured.

=== Madrassa ===
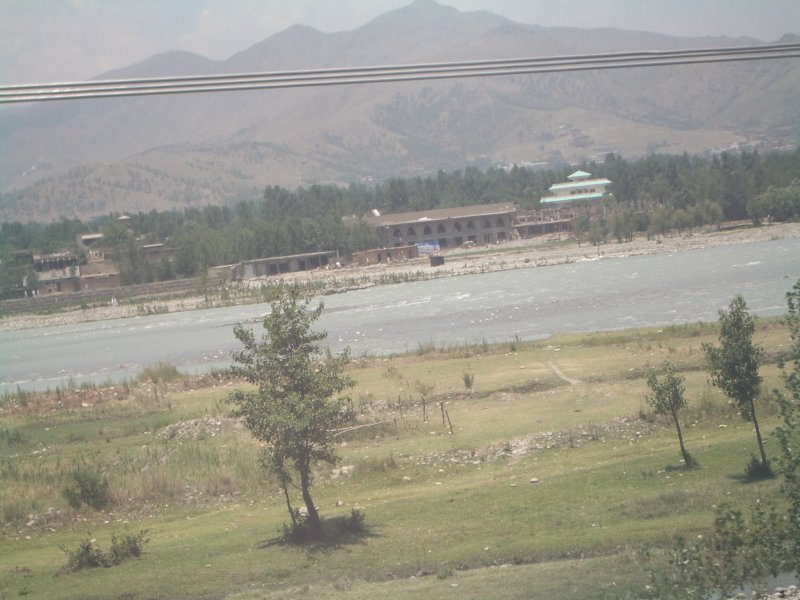
Fazlullah's madrasa at Imam Dherai, Swat. Pakistani security forces bombed and destroyed the compound in early June 2009.

Fazlullah developed a $US2.5 million madrassa with assistance from the Taliban which was used as his base of operations. It was funded by the JEI faction led by Maulana Sami-ul-haq.

=== Operations from Afghanistan ===
On 29 November 2007, Pakistani security forces captured Fazlullah's headquarters and arrested his brother. Fazlullah himself had already fled to another village. Security Forces have now retaken most of the Swat region. In 2007, Fazlullah was allegedly hiding in the Konar province in Afghanistan. On 26 January 2008, it was reported that Maulvi Abdul Raziq, a close aide of Fazlullah, was arrested in the Kot area of Charbagh. In November 2009, Fazlullah told the BBC's Urdu Service that he had escaped from Pakistan to Afghanistan and warned that he would continue to attack Pakistani forces in Swat.

In October 2011, Maj Gen Athar Abbas complained to Reuters that Pakistan had urged Afghanistan and the US to take action against Fazlullah in response to cross-border raids in Dir, Bajaur and Mohmand from April 2011 to August 2011 but that no efforts had been made. Abbas elaborated, "Fazlullah and his group are trying to re-enter Swat through Dir."

In June 2012, a TTP spokesman claimed that Fazlullah was leading attacks on Pakistan from Afghanistan's border provinces. Reuters indicated that he controlled a 20-km stretch of area in Nuristan province along the Pakistani border.

On 3 December 2013, it was revealed to the media by TTP spokesperson that Fazlullah has crossed the Pak-Afghan border into Pakistan's tribal areas, he was expected to end the squabbling among the Taliban leadership relating to his appointment as new TTP Chief.

=== Tehrik-e-Taliban Pakistan leadership ===
After the death of Hakimullah Mehsud in a drone attack, Fazlullah was appointed the new "Emir" (Chief) of the Tehrik-e-Taliban Pakistan on 7 November 2013. According to Ehsanullah Ehsan, the former spokesperson for TTP, Mullah Fazlullah became the leader via lucky draw.

=== Army Public School attack in Peshawar ===
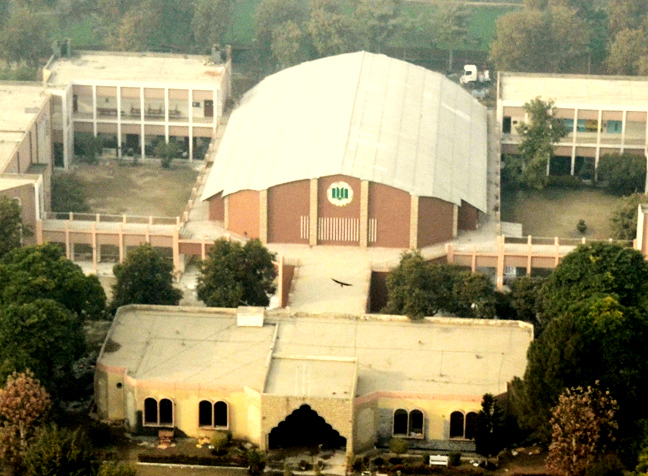
Army Public School Auditorium

On 16 December 2014, six militants reportedly dressed as Pakistani Army soldiers entered the school through the graveyard situated on the backside of school and killed around 141 people including 132 students and the principal. In reaction to this massacre, Pakistan intensified its ongoing operation Zarb-e-Azab against the militants. Some Pakistani officials claim that Fazlullah masterminded the attack and subsequently hid on the Afghan side of the Durand Line. He narrowly escaped a U.S. drone strike on 25 November 2014.

== Views and opposition to female education ==
In 2001, many seats reserved for women in northern Pakistan went unfilled due in large part to the actions of the TNSM. In 2005, Fazlullah was quoted as saying: We have our tradition that bans women from taking part in the elections and violators will be punished.

Fazlullah started an illegal local FM channel in Khyber-Pakhtunkhwa's Swat Valley in 2006. He preached forcing vice and virtue and had an anti-Western Jihadi stance. He was considered pro-Taliban and was a very powerful figure in the area. He considered most communication-based electronics as "major sources of spreading Jihad" and transmitted broadcasts of his sermons on an illegal local FM radio channel, hence the nickname "Radio Mullah" or "Maulana Radio".

FM signals were relayed from mobile transmitters mounted on motorcycles and trucks. During nightly broadcasts, prohibited activities were routinely declared and violators' names announced for assassination, which often included beheading.

With Swat under Fazlullah's control, he and his followers quickly moved to set up the Sharia Courts as primary judicial courts instead of when he was running them parallel to the Pakistani National Judicial Courts.

He led a drive of eradicating vices such as music, dancing, and of what he calls "major sources of sin" such as TVs, CDs, computers and other video equipment by burning the electronics or the shops in which they are housed. Fazlullah threatened barbers who shaved their customers' beards and warned against girls attending schools.

He opposed a polio vaccination drive in Khyber-Pakhtunkhwa claiming that aid workers were seeking to proselytise in the region, as well as spy for foreign forces. In some sermons he had also considered it against Islamic norms. He considered Hepatitis C as a more important health issue than polio and questioned the West's intentions. The propaganda had hindered the drive immensely as the local people saw volunteers and workers for the World Health Organization vaccination program as a threat and in some cases the immunization teams were physically beaten.

On 9 October 2012, an assassin instructed by Fazlullah shot Malala Yousafzai. Although the attack was meant to kill Yousafzai, it made her a very respected and prominent leader.

== Death ==
On 23 March 2015, Pakistani military forces and the Pakistani media reported that Fazlullah was killed on the border between Pakistan and Afghanistan. This claim was denied by Tehrik-i-Taliban Pakistan. On 14 June 2018, Fazlullah was killed in an American drone strike in Kunar Province, Afghanistan. The TTP confirmed his death and announced Mufti Noor Wali Mehsud alias Abu Mansoor Asim as their new leader.

== See also ==
- Adnan Rashid
- Baitullah Mehsud
- Malala Yousafzai

== Notes ==
Military offices
Preceded by Hakimullah Mehsud	Leader of Pakistani Taliban; 2013–2018	Succeeded by Noor Wali Mehsud
