= Tehreek-e-Nafaz-e-Shariat-e-Mohammadi =

Islamist militant group in Pakistan

Tehreek Nafaz Shariat Mohammadi تحریک نفاذ شریعت محمدی Movement for the Enforcement of Islamic Law
- Founder: Muhammad bin Alhazrat Hassan (POW)
- Leaders: Sufi Muhammad (POW) (1992–2002); Fazal Hayat † (2002–2018)
- Dates active: 1992–present
- Split from: Jamaat-e-Islami Pakistan
- Active regions: Pakistan
- Ideology: Pan-Islamism; Deobandism; Deobandi Jihadism; Islamism
- Part of: Tehrik-i-Taliban Pakistan (since 2007)

Tehreek-e-Nafaz-e-Shariat-e-Mohammadi (TNSM, Urdu: تحریک نفاذ شریعت محمدی, lit. 'Movement for the Enforcement of Islamic Law') is a Sunni Islamist militant group. The group swore an oath of loyalty to Pakistani Taliban and became a part of it in 2007 following the aftermath of the siege of Lal Masjid. The group's stated objective is to overthrow the Pakistani government and enforce Sharia law in Pakistan.

The group took over much of Swat in 2007. It was founded by Sufi Muhammad in 1992, and was banned by President Pervez Musharraf on January 12, 2002.

The organization is based in the areas along the Pakistan-Afghanistan border, especially Dir, Swat, Thana and Malakand but including Dargai and Chenagai. It supports the Afghan Taliban, Pakistani Taliban and al-Qaeda based militants in neighbouring Afghanistan. It has been described as "one of the most dangerous religious militant groups in Pakistan." The head of the organisation, Sufi Muhammad (1933-2019), was freed in 2008 after he renounced violence.

== Characteristics ==
The members of TNSM are "identified by their shoulder-length hair and camouflage vests over traditional shalwar kameez clothing", according to a 2007 Associated Press report. Numerous non-native militants have been recruited to work with the group from elsewhere in North Waziristan, many of them originally from outside Pakistan, including Afghans and Arabs.

== Enforcement of Sharia ==
As part of what it sees as enforcement of Sharia law, the group has bombed girls schools and blown up video and CD shops. Fazlullah has also used his FM broadcasts to urge schoolgirls to wear all-covering burqas and has forced the closure of some development organizations, accusing them of spreading immorality by employing female staff.

== History ==
=== Origins ===
It was founded by Sufi Muhammad who was a Salafi religious cleric and a senior member of Jamaat-e-Islami Pakistan (JIP), an Islamist political party of Pakistan during 1980s he was the most influential leader of JIP in Malakand Division Districts. In 1992 Sufi with his followers separated from JIP and the formed Tehreek-e-Nafaz-e-Shariat-e-Mohammadi (TNSM), an Islamic extremist militant group with an objective to enforce Sharia law in his stronghold Malakand Division Districts through force. Sufi and his group established correspondence with Al-Qaeda and engaged in violent agitation for the enforcement of Sharia law.

== Activities ==
=== 1994 Malakand Division Revolt ===
Sufi Muhammad fomented an insurrection in Malakand Division (Dir, Swat, Bajaur, Chitral) on the basis of a demand for Sharia law. The uprising was quashed by the Pakistan military, but not before TNSM had brought the Dir and Swat under its control. Timergara was besieged by government/military artillery and fighting was particularly intense in Swat

It is alleged that while under TNSM control, drivers were forced to switch to driving on the right side of the road, which resulted in many accidents.

=== 2001–2002 ===
Sufi Muhammad was jailed in November for sending thousands of volunteers to Afghanistan to fight the U.S.-led invasion in 2001. During his imprisonment, Muhammad's son-in-law Maulana Fazlullah, known as "Mullah Radio" for his pirate FM station broadcasts, led TNSM.

President Pervez Musharraf banned the group on January 12, 2002.

=== 2005 ===
After a brief decline, the group experienced a revival in the aftermath of the October 2005 earthquake. Radio broadcasts reinforced local beliefs that the earthquake was a punishment for sins, and local inhabitants of the region destroyed electronic equipment, such as televisions and computers, in response.

=== 2007 ===
In July 2007, the group took over much of the Swat District and held on to it as late as November, when Pakistani forces ousted Maulana Fazlullah and his followers from a large base in the village of Imam Dheri.

The stronghold, eight kilometres from the valley's main town of Mingora in Kabal Union Council of northwestern Swat, was guarded by about 200 rebel fighters.

An Associated Press reporter who visited the base in October 2007 described it as a concrete complex near the village. "Inside is a mosque and a maze of dozens of rooms, many still under construction. A shop sells audio cassettes of speeches by Fazlullah." Although the seminary hadn't opened for students, it was drawing thousands of worshippers for Friday prayers, residents told the Associated Press. Fazlullah's spokesman, Sirajuddin, then based at the seminary, is a gray-bearded militant who goes by only one name.

About 250 militants died in two weeks of fighting in late November, during which the two-square-kilometer base was bombarded by artillery, according to Pakistani authorities. People in a number of towns destroyed the fortified bunkers the rebels, including Fazlullah and Sirajuddin, had left behind as the militants retreated into the mountains.

==== Attacks on Buddhist sculptures ====
On October 8, 2007, members of the TNSM group used dynamite to obliterate the face of the 23 foot high colossal image of a seated Buddha carved in c. 7th century CE into a reddish rock face on a hillside to the southwest of the village of Jehanabad (Shakhorai) near Manglawar in Swat district. According to Aqleem Khan, an archaeology department official of North Western Frontier Province who spoke to Reuters, the members of this group drilled holes into the rock, filled them with dynamite, then set off the explosion on October 9, 2007, morning.

=== 2008 ===
Sufi Muhammad was released after he renounced violence in discussion with the provincial government. Eight leaders of TNSM signed a peace agreement that recognized the provincial government's sovereignty, urged an end to violence and declared attacks against police, military and government targets "un-Islamic."

=== 2009 ===
As of January 2009 Tehreek-e-Nafaz-e-Shariat-e-Mohammadi had established Shariah courts, that "openly administer punishment to people who dared to violate their strict code of conduct" in a region extending "from Matta sub-division in upper Swat valley to Kabal sub-division close the main Mingora town."

==== Campaign against female education ====
A January 21, 2009 issue of the Pakistan daily newspaper The News, reported Taliban enforcement of a complete ban on female education in the Swat district. Some 400 private schools enrolling 40,000 girls were forced to close. At least 10 girls schools that tried to open after the January 15, 2009 deadline by the Fazlullah-led Taliban were destroyed by the militants in the town of Mingora, the headquarters of the Swat district. Over the past 14 months "more than 170 schools have been bombed or torched, along with other government-owned buildings."

Maulvi Omar, a spokesman for the Tehrik-i-Taliban Pakistan (TTP), urged the Fazlullah-led Swati Taliban to rethink the ban on female education. Muslim Khan, a spokesman for the Swati Taliban responded that the TTP had not formally requested an overturn of the ban and that his group would continue as planned. However, Khan announced in a phone call to the Gulf News on January 28, 2009, that his group would reconsider the ban on education for women in consultation with religious scholars once conflict had ended in the area. He stated, "We are not against education, but we insist that our new generation should be imparted with religious and then scientific and technology education. The Taliban need doctors, engineers and scientists to strengthen our cause." This is also being noticed now that taliban have begun to target Pakistani scientists and engineers of the strategic organizations.

==== Sharia Nizam-i-Adl Regulation 2009 ====
The Pakistani government announced on February 16, 2009, that it would allow Sharia law in the Malakand region. In return, Fazlullah's followers agreed to observe a ceasefire negotiated by Sufi Muhammad. On February 24, 2009, Muslim Khan publicly announced that the Swati Taliban would observe an indefinite ceasefire.

===== Reactions to ceasefire =====
- NATO feared that the agreement would only serve to allow militants to regroup and to create a safe haven for cross-border attacks into Afghanistan.
- Amnesty International expressed concern that the agreement would legitimize human rights abuses in the region.

===== End of negotiations =====
In early April 2009 Sufi Muhammad ended support for peace negotiations stating that the government had stalled the implementation of sharia courts in the Swat valley. President Asif Ali Zardari refused to sign any agreement until peace had been restored in the valley but failed to elaborate on how those conditions would be achieved. At the strong recommendation of the National Assembly President Zardari signed the agreement, the Sharia Nizam-i-Adl Regulation 2009, on April 13, 2009. A spokesman for Sufi Muhammad, Amir Izzat Khan, stated that the law would allow for peace in the Swat region and that the Taliban was in the process of disarmament. Muslim Khan added that an "Islamic syllabus" would be instituted in schools and that women would not be allowed to go to jobs or to markets so as not to become "show-pieces."

== Collaboration with the Pakistani Taliban ==
In 2007 Tehreek-e-Nafaz-e-Shariat-e-Mohammadi (TNSM) is an important member of the Pakistani Taliban coalition. In the aftermath of the 2007 siege of Lal Masjid by the Government of Pakistan against extremists, The Fazlullah's Tehreek-e-Nafaz-e-Shariat-e-Mohammadi (TNSM) forces and Baitullah Mehsud's Tehrik-i-Taliban Pakistan (TTP) formed an alliance against the government. The TNSM leader Fazal Hayat aka Mullah Fazlullah and his loyal followers and fighters reportedly received orders from TTP chiefs Baitullah Mehsud and Hakimullah Mehsud as it becomes the main member of TTP,s coalition against the regime TNSM,s Mullah Fazullah played a main crucial role in partnership by increasing the influence of TNSM on leadership of TTP that after the killing of both Mehsuds in a drone strike the TTP appointed him as the new chief of the organization he also served as the leader of TNSM until his killing in 2018 he was designated as the most feared and dangerous militant of Pakistan's history under his leadership TTP had conducted deadliest attacks in the country.

== Destruction of headquarters ==
In June 2009, Pakistani security forces bombed and destroyed the Imam Dheri compound that served as Fazlullah's headquarters. The compound had contained residences, a mosque, court and prison.

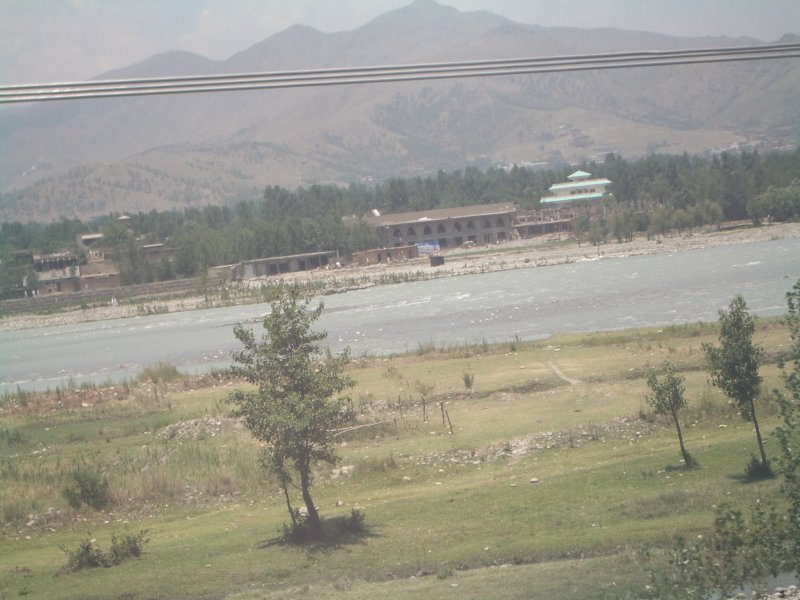
Fazlullah's madrasa at Imam Dherai, Swat. Pakistani security forces bombed and destroyed the compound in early June 2009.
