= Noor Wali Mehsud =

Emir of the Pakistani Taliban since 2018

Mufti Noor Wali Mehsud
- نور ولی محسود
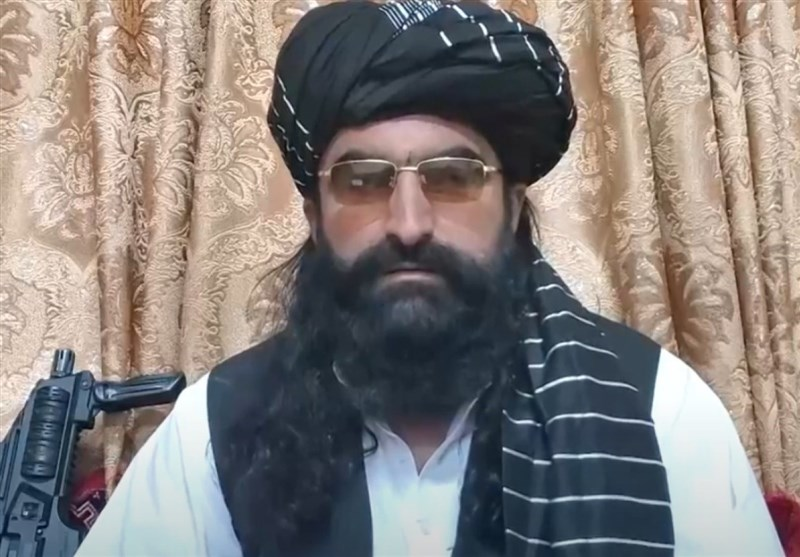
- Mehsud in 2018

4th Emir of the Pakistani Taliban (TTP)
- In office 22 June 2018 – 21 November 2026
- Preceded by: Fazal Hayat

Personal details
- Born: 26 June 1978 (age 48) Tiarza Subdivision, South Waziristan, Khyber Pakhtunkhwa, Pakistan
- Nickname: Abu Mansoor Asim

Military service
- Allegiance: Taliban (1996–1998, 2001); Pakistani Taliban (2003–present)
- Years of service: 1996–1998; 2001; 2003–present
- Rank: Emir of the Pakistani Taliban
- Battles/wars: Insurgency in Khyber Pakhtunkhwa; Battle of Wanna; Operation Rah-e-Nijat; Operation Zarb-e-Azb; Operation Radd-ul-Fasaad; 2023 Kurram conflict; 2024 Kurram conflict; Operation Azm-e-Istehkam; Operation Sarbakaf; Afghanistan–Pakistan border conflicts; 2023 Chitral cross-border attacks; Afghanistan–Pakistan clashes (2024–present); 2025 Afghanistan–Pakistan conflict; Afghan conflict; Afghan Civil War (1996–2001); Battles of Mazar-i-Sharif (1997–1998); War in Afghanistan (2001–2021); 2026 Afghanistan–Pakistan war

Noor Wali Mehsud (Note: Pashto: نور ولی محسود) (born 26 June 1978), also known by his nom de guerre Abu Mansur Asim, is a Pakistani militant who has been serving as the fourth emir of the Tehreek-i-Taliban Pakistan (TTP) since 2018. On 22 June 2018, Mehsud was named the emir of the TTP after the former emir, Mullah Fazlullah, was killed in a US drone strike in Kunar, Afghanistan. He is designated terrorist by United States, United Nations, Pakistan.

Mehsud became TTP emir during the group's weakest point since its inception, as the TTP no longer held territory in Pakistan and had been troubled by internal divisions. Despite this, since Mehsud's rule, the TTP appears to have "grown deadlier." Mehsud steered the TTP in a new direction, sparing civilians and ordering assaults only on security and law enforcement personnel, in an attempt to rehabilitate the group's image and distance them from the Islamic State – Khorasan Province (Daesh–Khorasan) militant group's extremism.

The US classified Mehsud as a Specially Designated Global Terrorist on 10 September 2019. In July 2020, Mehsud was included on the ISIL and Al-Qaeda Sanctions Committee list by the United Nations.

Although some sources reported his assassination in October 2025, the TTP released a voice note from Mehsud where he stated that he was still alive. On 17 October 2025, the TTP also released a video reportedly filmed in Khyber Agency, Khyber Pakhtunkhwa, Pakistan, as a "proof of life" for its leader, Noor Wali Mehsud. In the footage, Mehsud appears in person to confirm he is alive and directly addresses recent reports—and alleged airstrikes—that claimed to have killed him.

== Early life ==
=== Family background ===
Noor Wali Mehsud was born on 26 June 1978 in a village in the Tiarza Subdivision of the South Waziristan region of Khyber Pakhtunkhwa. He hails from the Mechikhel sub-clan of the Mehsud tribe, a Pashtun tribe native to the Sararogha Subdivision of the South Waziristan region.

=== Religious education and Afghan Civil War ===
Noor Wali Mehsud received a rudimentary education at Madrisa Siddiqia Ospas. Throughout the 1990s, Mehsud studied on and off at madrasas Jamia Imdadia, Jamia Haleemia and Jamia Farooq-e-Azam in Faisalabad, Jamia Nusratul Uloom in Gujranwala, and Jamia Ahsan-ul-Uloom and Jamia Yaseenul Quran in Karachi. Around 1996–1997, Mehsud's religious education was interrupted as he left for Afghanistan to fight alongside the Afghan Taliban and allied jihadist forces against Ahmad Shah Massoud's Northern Alliance. He fought in various battles during the latter phase of the Afghan Civil War like the Battles of Mazar-i-Sharif (1997–98) and battles north of Kabul. On the advice of his father, Haji Gul Shah Khan, Noor Wali Mehsud returned to Pakistan to finish his religious education, graduating in 1999. Upon graduating, Mehsud started using the title mufti denoting his Islamic religious scholarship. Over the next two years, Mehsud taught Islamic theology at Madrassa Imdad-ul-Uloom in the Gorgoray area in South Waziristan.

== War on Terror ==
=== United States invasion of Afghanistan ===
Following the 2001 September 11th attacks and the subsequent United States invasion of Afghanistan, Mufti Noor Wali Mehsud returned to Afghanistan with a convoy of Deobandi Jamiat Ulema-e-Islam (F) fighters led by Maulana Mirajuddin Mehsud in hopes of propping up the Taliban regime. Despite the efforts of foreign jihadists, the Taliban government was overthrown by US and Northern Alliance forces in December 2001, prompting Mufti Noor Wali Mehsud to retreat across the border into Pakistan, along with droves of Afghan Taliban, Al-Qaeda, and other jihadist fighters. Over the next year, Mufti Noor Wali Mehsud, along with many other jihadists and jihadist sympathizers in the Federally Administered Tribal Areas, sheltered fleeing Taliban and Al-Qaeda fighters, providing them a launching pad for their insurgent operations in neighboring Afghanistan.

Under pressure from the US, Pakistan began deploying troops throughout the FATA and along the border with Afghanistan with the goal of apprehending jihadists seeking shelter in Pakistan. This move was considered an unprecedented violation of the tribes's sovereignty and was condemned by many parties across Pakistan. Throughout 2002–2003, Pakistan began to intensify their military presence and began launching counter-terrorism operations within the FATA, only to be met by more condemnation and suspicion by various local tribes and political parties. In addition, the local Pashtun tribes began to feel that they were being subjugated by the Pakistani military. Not only was their military presence a violation of their sovereignty, but according to Mufti Noor Wali Mehsud, Pakistan's demand for the release of the jihadists whom they sheltered would be a violation of the principle of melmastia (hospitality), a major component of Pashtunwali (Pashtun tribal code). It was in this environment, Mufti Noor Wali Mehsud saw the need for a "defensive jihad" in Pakistan to resist American imperialism. Noor Wali joined the Mehsud branch of the Pakistani Taliban in 2003, shortly before the start of the War in Northwest Pakistan.

=== War in Northwest Pakistan ===
==== Early insurgent activities ====
Fighting broke out on 16 March 2004 when the Pakistani army began an operation to clear out Al-Qaeda jihadists from the Wanna area in South Waziristan, being met with fierce resistance. In this battle, Mufti Noor Wali Mehsud lead local Taliban fighters in an ambush of the Pakistani army in Tayar Manza. The Battle of Wanna ended in a Pakistani victory, but marked the beginning of the War in Northwest Pakistan. A ceasefire was signed in April 2004, but was quickly broken, as fighting in the tribal areas continued throughout 2004. During a Pakistani military operation in September 2004, Mufti Noor Wali Mehsud was put in charge of the local organization and lead the local Talibans against the Pakistani army.

Due to Noor Wali's religious education, he was made a qazi (judge) in a Taliban court formed by Baitullah Mehsud. According to locals, Mufti Noor Wali Mehsud famously sentenced Pakistani Taliban leader Baitullah Mehsud to three days in jail. During this period it is also believed Noor Wali served as a deputy to Baitullah Mehsud.

==== Assassination of Benazir Bhutto ====
On 27 December 2007, former prime minister Benazir Bhutto was assassinated in Rawalpindi. After the overwhelming public backlash following the assassination, which included widespread rioting and property destruction, the TTP saw it necessary to save face by denying involvement in the assassination. On 29 December, Maulvi Omar, official spokesperson of Baitullah Mehsud released a statement denying involvement in Benazir Bhutto's assassination saying, "I strongly deny it. Tribal people have their own customs. We don't strike women." At the same time, the Pakistani government released the transcript from an intercepted phone call between TTP members Maulvi Sahib "Mister cleric" and Baitullah Mehsud in which Maulvi Sahib claimed responsibility for the attack, saying "They were our men there" and that "There were Saeed, the second was Badarwala Bilal and Ikramullah was also there." Maulvi Sahib clarified that Ikramullah and Badarwala Bilal did it, before being congratulated by Baitullah Mehsud and agreeing to meet in Makin at "Anwar Shah's house."

No one openly claimed responsibility for the assassination of Bhutto until 2017, when Noor Wali Mehsud, in his book, took credit for carrying out the assassination. Mehsud explained that Benazir Bhutto "allegedly planned to collaborate with the US against the mujahideen if she returned to power," and that the Bhutto's return was "planned at the behest of the Americans as they had given her a plan against the Mujahideed-e-Islam. Baitullah had received information of the plan." Due to the threat they believed she posed to the TTP, they decided to carry out the assassination, first in the October 18 Karachi bombing which failed to kill Bhutto and again in the successful 27 December assassination.

Mehsud also provided details on the attack from the TTP's perspective, mentioning that following the failed assassination attempt in October 2007, "the government had not taken appropriate security measures that made it possible for the attackers to have easy access to Benazir Bhutto in Rawalpindi," partially implicating then president, Pervez Musharraf in Bhutto's assassination. Mehsud mentioned the assassination's masterminds Moulvi Imran, Ahmas alias Nasrullah, Qari Ismail, and Mullah Ihsan and their role in the planning of the attack. Mehsud also named Ikramullah and Badarwala Bilal as the bombers tasked with carrying out the attack, including a description of the attack, saying, "Bomber Bilal first fired at Benazir Bhutto from his pistol and the bullet hit her neck. Then he detonated his explosive jacket and blew himself up among the participants of the procession." According to Mehsud, Ikramullah never detonated his suicide belt and fled the scene to his home town of Makin before going to Afghanistan, where he resides now.

==== Rising through the ranks ====
Flyer distributed by the Pakistani government, announcing bounties on high-level TTP commanders. Noor Wali Mehsud is #6 on the list

Following the assassination of Baitullah Mehsud, Noor Wali operated out of the Gorgoray area in his native South Waziristan. In 2009, he ran a TTP training camp in Gorgoray, as evidenced by the flyers sent out by the Pakistani government that placed bounties on high-level TTP commanders, provided pictures, and described their role in the organization. As of November 2009, Mufti Noor Wali Mehsud had a bounty of 2 million rupees placed on his head. Noor Wali also served as the head of the TTP's publication/media wing.

In 2012, the TTP began to strengthen its influence in some of Pakistan's major cities like Karachi away from its traditional strongholds along the Afghan border. In June 2013, Mufti Noor Wali Mehsud was appointed head of the TTP's Karachi chapter to ensure the TTP's continued growth in Karachi. In this position, he oversaw the extortion and kidnapping of many of Karachi's residents, bank robberies, and assassinations for money to fund the TTP's operations. Noor Wali lead the TTP's Karachi chapter remotely from Miramshah, a traditional TTP stronghold, rarely visiting Karachi in person. Mehsud usually demanded Pashtun residents of Karachi resolve their business disputes through the TTP courts in Miramshah, where the TTP could carry out extortions. Those who ignored Noor Wali's demands had their families and their businesses threatened and intimidated by Mehsud's men. In one such instance, Muhammad Ibrahim, the owner of a transportation company in Karachi, was called to the TTP courts in Miramshah to resolve a business dispute with a relative. According to Ibrahim, during Mufti Noor Wali Mehsud's reign over Karachi, "Our community was getting regular calls from Wali’s office, threatening people that they will target them or their families if they failed to pay extortion money." After attending TTP court hearings in Miramshah, Muhammad Ibrahim was ordered to pay his relative $1,600, from which the TTP would take a cut. According to Mehsud, Pakistan's renewed crackdown on Karachi militant groups in September 2013, resulted in the "extrajudicial killing" of most of the TTP's top commanders in Karachi, severely limiting the TTP's capabilities in the city. Noor Wali remained the head of the TTP's Karachi franchise until May 2015.

He went on to become the deputy of Khalid Mehsud, the leader of the TTP's most powerful faction, the Mehsud Taliban. After Khalid Mehsud's February 2018 assassination in a drone strike, Noor Wali Mehsud succeeded him as head of the Mehsud Taliban. Also in early 2018, Mufti Noor Wali Mehsud was promoted to deputy head of the TTP, second in command to then leader, Maulana Fazlullah. Fazlullah was killed in a US drone strike in Afghanistan on 14 June 2018 and after a week-long deliberation period, the TTP named Mufti Noor Wali Mehsud as the group's emir.

False reports were widely reported in Pakistani media that Mehsud was killed in a drone strike in Afghanistan on 25 June 2021. The TTP denied the claim. The claim was proven false after CNN published a video interview with Mehsud on 26 July 2021.

== Beliefs and writings ==
A religious scholar and trained mufti, Noor Wali Mehsud was the head of TTP's publications department, Umar Media. His most notable written work was Inquilaab Mehsud South Waziristan: Farangi Raj se Ameriki Samraj tak, translated as The Mehsud Revolution in South Waziristan: From British Raj to Oppressive America, a 690-page book released in November 2017. This book detailed atrocities committed by the TTP and claimed the organisation was responsible for the assassination of former Prime Minister Benazir Bhutto.

== Airstrikes ==
On 9 October 2025, Noor Wali Mehsud was targeted by an airstrike in Kabul, Afghanistan. Multiple sources confirmed the incident to Amu TV after residents reported explosions near Abdul Haq Square in central Kabul. The Taliban government of Afghanistan acknowledged the attacks and announced an investigation into the incident. Afghan officials later said that Mehsud is safe.

On 17 October 2025, the TTP released a video reportedly filmed in Khyber District, Khyber Pakhtunkhwa, Pakistan, as a "proof of life" for its leader, Noor Wali Mehsud. In the footage, Mehsud appears in person to confirm he is alive and directly addresses recent reports—and alleged airstrikes—that claimed to have killed him.

== Notes ==
Military offices
| Preceded by Maulana Fazlullah | Leader of Pakistani Taliban; 2018–present | Succeeded by Incumbent |
