= Pakistani Taliban =

Islamist militant organisation

Tehreek-e-Taliban Pakistan
- تحریکِ طالبان پاکستان
- Other name: Pakistani Taliban; Taliban Movement of Pakistan
- Leaders: Baitullah Mehsud † (2007–2009); Hakimullah Mehsud † (2009–2013); Mullah Fazlullah † (2013–2018); Noor Wali Mehsud (2018–present)
- Dates active: December 2007 – present
- Allegiance: Afghanistan (self-declared, publicly rejected by IEA)
- Group: Total groups: 60: Jamaat-ul-Ahrar (Note: Until 2020, when it re-merged into the TTP.); TNSM (Note: Collaboration with the TTP in 2007.); Lashkar-e-Islam (Note: Collaboration with the TTP in 2015.); Tariq Gidar Group; Harakat-e-Inqilab-e-Islami; Hafiz Gul Bahadur Group; Jaish-e-Fursan-e-Muhammad; Naeem Bukhari group
- Headquarters: Eastern Afghanistan
- Active regions: Northwest Pakistan (Khyber Pakhtunkhwa); Northern Balochistan; Eastern/South eastern Afghanistan; Southern Sindh (Karachi); Northern Punjab
- Ideology: Deobandi jihadism Islamic fundamentalism Pashtunwali; Sectarianism; Separatism
- Status: Active
- Size: 25,000 (2014); 3,000–5,000 in Afghanistan (2019 USDOD estimate); 6,000–6,500 total (2024 UN intelligence estimate); 7,000–10,000 (2022 Pakistani government estimate)
- Wars: See engagements: Insurgency in Khyber Pakhtunkhwa; Battle of Wanna; Operation al-Mizan; Battle of Mirali; Operation Rah-e-Haq (First Battle of Swat); 2007 Kurram Agency conflict; Operation Zalzala; Battle of Bajaur; Operation Sirat-e-Mustaqeem; Operation Rah-e-Rast (Second Battle of Swat); Operation Rah-e-Nijat; 2009 Khyber Pass offensive; Operation Janbaz; Mohmand Offensive; Operation Black Thunderstorm; Orakzai and Kurram offensive; 2011 Chitral cross-border attacks; Operation Koh-e-Sufaid; Operation Rah-e-Shahadat; Operation Khyber; Operation Zarb-e-Azb; Operation Radd-ul-Fasaad; 2023 Chitral cross-border attacks; 2023 Kurram conflict; 2024 Kurram conflict; Operation Azm-e-Istehkam; Operation Sarbakaf; Insurgency in Balochistan; Operation Radd-ul-Fasaad; Operation Azm-e-Istehkam; Afghanistan–Pakistan border conflicts; 2011 Chitral cross-border attacks; 2023 Chitral cross-border attacks; 2025 North Waziristan border clashes; Afghanistan–Pakistan clashes (2024–present); 2025 Afghanistan–Pakistan conflict; 2026 Afghanistan–Pakistan war; Global War on Terrorism; War in Afghanistan (2001–2021); Taliban insurgency; Afghan conflict; Afghan civil war (1996–2001); War in Afghanistan (2001–2021); Islamic State–Taliban conflict; Republican insurgency in Afghanistan; Syrian Civil War; Battle of Aleppo (2012–2016); 2024 Syrian opposition offensives; Battle of Aleppo (2024); Fall of Damascus

The Tehreek-e-Taliban Pakistan (Note: Pashto: تحریکِ طالبان پاکستان, lit. 'Taliban Movement of Pakistan'; also transliterated as Tehrik-i-Taliban Pakistan, Tehreek-e-Taliban Pakistan and Tehreek-i-Taliban Pakistan.) (TTP), or simply the Pakistani Taliban, is a Deobandi jihadist militant organisation that primarily operates along the Afghanistan–Pakistan border. It is designated as a terrorist organisation by countries and international bodies including the United Nations and by the Government of Pakistan and the United States. A United Nations report released in July 2024 called the TTP "the largest terrorist group” in Afghanistan, which it said was receiving growing support from that country’s Taliban rulers. Founded by Baitullah Mehsud in 2007, it has been led by Noor Wali Mehsud since 2018. The TTP has publicly pledged allegiance to and fought alongside the Taliban, which has governed Afghanistan since 2021, but it operates independently and does not share the Taliban's command structure. Like the Taliban, the TTP ascribes to Pashtunwali and a highly conservative interpretation of Sunni Islam.

In Pakistan, the TTP is particularly known for carrying out suicide bombings and other attacks against government targets, political opponents, and Pakistani civilians. The organisation frequently engages in sectarian violence, especially against Shia Muslims and other non-Sunni minorities. Most Islamist organisations in Pakistan coalesce under the TTP. As a leading militant faction in Pakistan's Khyber Pakhtunkhwa insurgency, the TTP has claimed responsibility for several deadly attacks on the Pakistan Armed Forces, ultimately seeking to overthrow the Pakistani government and establish an Islamic state in line with the organisation's Deobandi ideology. The TTP has also used Pashtun-centric narratives and often incited violence against non-Pashtun ethnicities, such as the Hazaras. The TTP depends on the tribal belt along the Afghanistan–Pakistan border, from which it draws its recruits. In 2019, there were around 3,000 to 4,000 TTP militants in Afghanistan, according to a report by the United States Department of Defense. Between July and November 2020, the Amjad Farouqi group, one faction of the Lashkar-e-Jhangvi, the Musa Shaheed Karwan group, Mehsud factions of the TTP, Mohmand Taliban, Bajaur Taliban, Jamaat-ul-Ahrar, and Hizb-ul-Ahrar merged with TTP. This reorganisation made TTP more deadly and led to increased attacks.

The Pakistani Taliban have previously assisted the Afghan Taliban in the 2001–2021 war, however the two groups have separate ideologies and command structures.

In 2020, after years of factionalism and infighting, the TTP under the leadership of Noor Wali Mehsud underwent reorganisation and reunification. Mehsud has essentially steered the TTP in a new direction, sparing civilians and ordering assaults only on security and law enforcement personnel, in an attempt to rehabilitate the group's image and distance them from the Islamic State militant group's extremism.

After the Taliban takeover of Afghanistan in August 2021, Pakistan was unable to persuade the Afghan Taliban to crack down on the TTP. The Afghan Taliban instead mediated talks between Pakistan and the TTP, leading to the release of dozens of TTP prisoners in Pakistan and a temporary ceasefire between the Pakistani government and the TTP. After the ceasefire expired on 10 December 2021, the TTP increased attacks on Pakistani security forces from sanctuaries inside Afghanistan. The Pakistani airstrikes in Afghanistan's Khost and Kunar provinces on 16 April 2022 appeared to have been conducted in retaliation to the surge in terror attacks in Pakistan.

In 2025, the Pakistani Taliban was labelled as Fitna al-Khawarij (Note: Means "the Khariji trial". The term Kharijites is often used by modern mainstream Muslims to describe Islamist extremist groups that have been compared to the Kharijites for their radical ideology and militancy. The Arabic word fitna means "trial", "conflict", "calamity" or "torment".) by the Government of Pakistan on orders on the Interior Ministry, thereby requiring all media outlets to refer to the TTP as Kharjites. According to them, this was done "in order to reveal to the people" what the Pakistani government considered as "the group's actual ideology".

== History ==
=== Roots and development ===
The roots of the TTP as an organisation began in 2002 when the Pakistani military conducted incursions into the tribal areas to originally combat foreign (Afghan, Arab and Central Asian) militants fleeing from the war in Afghanistan into the neighbouring tribal areas of Pakistan. A 2004 article by the BBC explains:

The military offensive had been part of the overall war against al-Qaeda. ... Since the start of the operation, the [Pakistani] military authorities have firmly established that a large number of Uzbek, Chechen and Arab militants were in the area. ... It was in July 2002 that Pakistani troops, for the first time in 55 years, entered the Tirah Valley (Orakzai Agency) in Khyber tribal agency. Soon they were in Shawal valley of North Waziristan, and later in South Waziristan. ... This was made possible after long negotiations with various tribes, who reluctantly agreed to allow the military's presence on the assurance that it would bring in funds and development work. But once the military action started in South Waziristan a number of Waziri sub-tribes took it as an attempt to subjugate them. Attempts to persuade them into handing over the foreign militants failed, and with an apparently mishandling by the authorities, the security campaign against suspected al-Qaeda militants turned into an undeclared war between the Pakistani military and the rebel tribesmen.

Many of the TTP's leaders are veterans of the fighting in Afghanistan and have supported the fight against the NATO-led International Security Assistance Force by providing soldiers, training, and logistics. In 2004 various tribal groups, as explained above, that would later form the TTP, effectively established their authority in the Federally Administered Tribal Areas (FATA) by concurrently engaging in military attacks and negotiating with Islamabad. By this time, the militants had killed around 200 rival tribal elders in the region to consolidate control. Several Pakistani analysts also cite the inception of U.S. missile strikes in the FATA as a catalyzing factor in the rise of tribal militancy in the area. More specifically they single out an October 2006 strike on a madrassah in Bajaur that was run by the Tehreek-e-Nafaz-e-Shariat-e-Mohammadi as a turning point.

In December 2007, the existence of the TTP was officially announced under the leadership of Baitullah Mehsud. It was formed in response to Pakistan military operation against Al-Qaeda militants in Federally Administered Tribal Areas (FATA) in 2007.

On 25 August 2008, Pakistan banned the group, froze its bank accounts and assets, and barred it from media appearances. The government also announced that bounties would be placed on prominent leaders of the TTP.

In late December 2008 and early January 2009, Mullah Omar sent a delegation, led by former Guantanamo Bay detainee Mullah Abdullah Zakir, to persuade leading members of the TTP to put aside differences and aid the Afghan Taliban in combating the American presence in Afghanistan. Baitullah Mehsud, Hafiz Gul Bahadur, and Maulavi Nazir agreed in February and formed the Shura Ittehadul Mujahideen (SIM), also transliterated as Shura Ittehad-ul-Mujahideen and translated into English as the Council of United Mujahedeen. In a written statement circulated in a one-page Urdu-language pamphlet, the three affirmed that they would put aside differences to fight American-led forces and reasserted their allegiance to Mullah Omar and Osama bin Laden. However, the SIM did not last very long and collapsed shortly after its announcement.

=== Threats beyond Pakistan border ===
Qari Mehsud indicated in a video recorded in April 2010 the TTP would make cities in the United States a "main target" in response to U.S. drone attacks on TTP leaders. The TTP claimed responsibility for the December 2009 suicide attack on CIA facilities in Camp Chapman in Afghanistan, as well as the attempted bombing in Times Square in May 2010.

In July 2012, the TTP threatened to attack Myanmar in the wake of sectarian violence against Rohingya Muslims in the Arakan state. TTP spokesman Ehsanullah demanded the Pakistani government sever relations with Myanmar and close the Burmese embassy in Islamabad, and warned of attacks against Burmese interests if no action was taken. While the TTP has been conducting an insurgency in Pakistan, its ability to expand operations to other countries has been questioned. This was a rare occasion in which it warned of violence in another country.

=== Leadership crisis ===
In August 2009, a missile strike from a suspected U.S. drone killed Baitullah Mehsud. The TTP soon held a shura to appoint his successor. Government sources reported that fighting broke out during the shura between Hakimullah Mehsud and Wali-ur-Rehman. While Pakistani news channels reported that Hakimullah had been killed in the shooting, Interior Minister Rehman Malik could not confirm his death. On 18 August, Pakistani security officials announced the capture of Maulvi Omar, chief spokesperson of the TTP. Omar, who had denied the death of Baitullah, retracted his previous statements and confirmed the leader's death in the missile strike. He also acknowledged turmoil among TTP leadership following the killing.

After Omar's capture, Maulana Faqir Mohammed announced to the BBC that he would assume temporary leadership of the TTP and that Muslim Khan would serve as the organisation's primary spokesperson. He also maintained that Baitullah had not been killed, but rather was in bad health. Faqir further elaborated that decisions over leadership of the umbrella group would only be made in consultation and consensus with a variety of different TTP leaders. "The congregation of TTP leaders has 32 members and no important decision can be taken without their consultation," he told the BBC. He reported to the AFP that both Hakimullah Mehsud and Wali-ur-Rehman had approved his appointment as temporary leader of the militant group. Neither militant had publicly confirmed Faqir's statement, and analysts cited by Dawn News believed the assumption of leadership actually indicated a power struggle.

Two days later Faqir Mohammed retracted his claims of temporary leadership and said that Hakimullah Mehsud had been selected leader of the TTP. Faqir declared that the 42-member shura had also decided that Azam Tariq would serve as the TTP's primary spokesperson, rather than Muslim Khan.

Under the leadership of Hakimullah, the TTP intensified its suicide campaign against the Pakistani state and against civilian (particularly Shia, Qadiyani and Sufi) targets.

=== Designation as a terrorist organisation ===
On 1 September 2010, the United States designated the TTP as a Foreign Terrorist Organization (FTO) and identified Hakimullah Mehsud and Wali ur-Rehman as specially designated global terrorists. The designation of the TTP as an FTO makes it a crime to provide support or to do business with the group and also allows the U.S. to freeze its assets. The U.S. State Department also issued a $5 million reward for information on the two individuals' locations.

In January 2011, the British government moved to classify the TTP as a banned terrorist organisation under its Terrorism Act 2000.

In July 2011, the Canadian government also added the TTP to its list of banned terrorist organisations.

=== Internal splits ===
In February 2014, a group of TTP terrorists under the lead of Maulana Umar Qasmi broke away from the organisation to form the Ahrar-ul-Hind, in protest against the TTP's negotiations with the Pakistan government.

In May 2014, the Mehsud faction of the TTP defected from the main group to form a breakaway unit called Tehreek-e-Taliban South Waziristan led by Khalid Mehsud. The breakaway group was unhappy with the various activities of the TTP, saying in a statement "We consider kidnapping for ransom, extortion, damage to public facilities and bombings to be un-Islamic. TTP Mehsud group believes in stopping the oppressor from cruelty, and supporting the oppressed." The Mehsuds were widely seen as the most important group in the TTP and their loss was regarded as a major blow. In February 2017, the TTP announced that the Mehsud faction had rejoined the group, following the "defection of the rogue elements to the rival parties".

In August 2014, hardline elements of the TTP from four of the seven tribal districts formed a separate group called Tehreek-e-Taliban Pakistan Jamaat-ul-Ahrar, led by the Mohmand Agency commander Omar Khalid Khorosani, after disagreeing with Fazlullah's order to fight the Pakistani Army's Operation Zarb-e-Azb offensive in the Tribal Areas. However, in March 2015, Jamaat-ul-Ahrar's spokesman announced that they were rejoining the TTP. Some Uzbek and Arab fighters previously working with the TTP reportedly began leaving Pakistan to go to Iraq to fight alongside the Islamic State of Iraq and the Levant. In the same month, Asmatullah Muawiya, the commander of the Punjabi Taliban, announced that his faction was ending their armed struggle against the Pakistani state.

In October 2014, the TTP's spokesman, Shahidullah Shahid, and the group's commanders in Orakzai, Kurram and Khyber tribal regions and Peshawar and Hangu Districts defected from the TTP and pledged allegiance to Islamic State (IS).

== Organisational structure ==
=== Overview ===
The TTP differs in structure to the Afghan Taliban in that it lacks a strong central command and is a much looser coalition of various militant groups, united by hostility towards the central government in Islamabad.

In its original form, the TTP had Baitullah Mehsud as its amir. He was followed in the leadership hierarchy by Hafiz Gul Bahadur as naib amir, or deputy. Faqir Mohammed was the third most influential leader. The group contained members from all of FATA's seven tribal agencies as well as several districts of the North-West Frontier Province (NWFP), including Swat, Bannu, Tank, Lakki Marwat, Dera Ismail Khan, Kohistan, Buner, and Malakand. Some 2008 estimates placed the total number of operatives at 30–35,000, although it is difficult to judge the reliability of such estimates.

In the aftermath of Baitullah Mehsud's death, the organisation experienced turmoil among its leading militants. By the end of August 2009, however, leading members in the TTP had confirmed Hakimullah Mehsud as its second amir. Government and some TTP sources told the media that Hakimullah Mehsud was killed in January 2010 by injuries sustained during a U.S. drone attack. Unconfirmed reports from Orakzai Agency stated, after the death of Hakimullah Mehsud, Malik Noor Jamal, alias Maulana Toofan, had assumed leadership of the TTP until the group determined how to proceed.

Reuters indicated in July 2011 that Hakimullah Mehsud's grip on the TTP leadership was weakening after the defection of Fazal Saeed Haqqani, the TTP leader in the Kurram region, from the umbrella militant group. Haqqani cited disagreements over attacks on civilians as reason for the split. The paper quoted an associate of Mehsud's as saying that "it looks as though he is just a figurehead now... He can hardly communicate with his commanders in other parts of the tribal areas ... he is in total isolation. Only a few people within the TTP know where he is." A December 2011 report published in The Express Tribune further described the network as "crumbling" with "funds dwindling and infighting intensifying." According to various TTP operatives, the difficulties stemmed from differences of opinion within TTP leadership on pursuing peace talks with Islamabad. In December 2012 senior Pakistan military officials told Reuters that Hakimullah Mehsud had lost control of the group and that Wali-ur-Rehman was expected to be formally announced as the head of the TTP. However a video released later in the month showed Hakimullah Mehsud and Wali-ur-Rehman seated next to each other, with Mehsud calling reports of a split between the two as propaganda. Mehsud and Rahman were later killed in separate airstrikes in 2013.

In February 2020, the TTP reported the deaths of four TTP senior leaders within a one-week period. All of these four leaders, among them former TTP deputy leader Sheikh Khalid Haqqani and Hakimullah Mehsud group leader Sheharyar Mehsud, were killed within a month of each other as well.

=== Current leaders ===
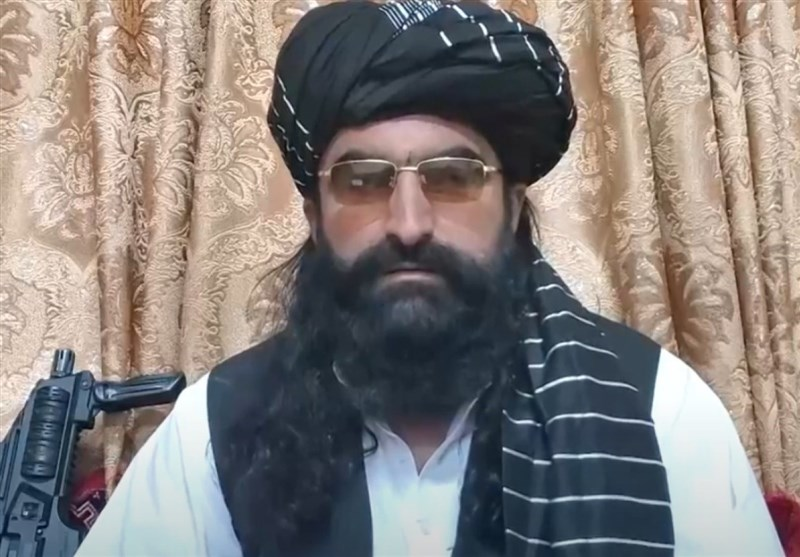
- Noor Wali Mehsud
  Noor Wali Mehsud (alias Abu Mansoor Asim) – Emir (chief) of Tehreek-i-Taliban Pakistan.
- Muzahim (alias Mufti Hazrat) – Naib emir (deputy chief) of TTP.
- Hafiz Gul Bahadur – Powerful faction in North Waziristan.
- Aleem Khan Khushali – Faction active in North Waziristan.
- Muhammad Khurasani – Central spokesman of TTP.

=== Media ===
The TTP's "media arm" is "Umar Media". Umar Media provides a "behind the scenes" look at Taliban attacks. Video clips are made in Pashto with Urdu subtitles. Umar Media also reportedly operated a Facebook page which had been created in September 2012 and had a few "likes" and a "handful of messages written in English". According to then TTP spokesman Ehsanullah Ehsan, the page was being "temporarily" used before the TTP would plan to launch its own website. SITE Intelligence Group described the Facebook page as a "recruitment centre" looking for people to edit the TTP's quarterly magazine and videos. The page was soon removed by Facebook and the account suspended.

== Relationship with other militant groups ==
In a May 2010 interview, U.S. Gen. David Petraeus described the TTP's relationship with other militant groups as difficult to decipher: "There is clearly a symbiotic relationship between all of these different organizations: Al-Qaeda, the Pakistani Taliban, the Afghan Taliban, TNSM [Tehreek-e-Nafaz-e-Shariat-e-Mohammadi]. And it's very difficult to parse and to try to distinguish between them. They support each other, they coordinate with each other, sometimes they compete with each other, [and] sometimes they even fight each other. But at the end of the day, there is quite a relationship between them."

Director of National Intelligence and United States Navy Admiral, Dennis C. Blair, told U.S. senators that the Pakistani state and army meanwhile draw clear distinctions among different militant groups. While links exist between the Pakistani and Afghan Taliban, the two groups are distinct enough for the Pakistani military to be able to view them very differently. American officials said that the S Wing of the Pakistani ISI provided direct support to three major groups carrying out attacks in Afghanistan: the Afghan Taliban based in Quetta, Pakistan, commanded by Mullah Muhammad Omar; the militant network run by Gulbuddin Hekmatyar; and a different group run by the guerrilla leader Jalaluddin Haqqani, all considered a strategic asset by Pakistan in contrast to the TTP run by Hakimullah Mehsud, which has engaged the Pakistani army in combat.

=== Afghan Taliban ===
The Afghan Taliban and the Pakistani Taliban share the same ideology and a dominant Pashtun ethnicity, but they are distinct movements, differing in their histories, structures and goals. The two groups frequently don't get along with each other. An Afghan Taliban spokesman told The New York Times: "We don't like to be involved with them, as we have rejected all affiliation with Pakistani Taliban fighters ... We have sympathy for them as Muslims, but beside that, there is nothing else between us." Peshawar-based security analyst Brigadier (retd) Muhamaad Saad believes the Taliban are not a monolithic entity. "They can be divided into three broad categories: Kandahari Taliban (Afghan Taliban), led by Mullah Omar; Paktia Taliban (Haqqani network), led by Jalaluddin Haqqani and his son Sirajuddin Haqqani; and Salfi Taliban (Pakistani Taliban)," he said. "It's the Salfi Taliban who pose a real threat to Pakistan. They may not be obeying the Taliban supreme leader Mullah Omar." Some regional experts state that the common name "Taliban" may be more misleading than illuminating. Gilles Dorronsoro of the Carnegie Endowment for International Peace believes that "the fact that they have the same name causes all kinds of confusion." As the Pakistani Army began offensives against the Pakistani Taliban, many unfamiliar with the region mistakenly thought that the assault was against the Afghan Taliban of Mullah Omar.

The TTP has almost exclusively targeted elements of the Pakistani state. The Afghan Taliban however have historically relied on support from the Pakistani army in their campaign to control Afghanistan. Regular Pakistani army troops fought alongside the Afghan Taliban in the War in Afghanistan (1996–2001). Major leaders of the Afghan Taliban including Mullah Omar, Jalaluddin Haqqani and Siraj Haqqani are believed to have enjoyed safe haven in Pakistan. In 2006, Jalaluddin Haqqani was called a 'Pakistani asset' by a senior official of Pakistan's Inter-Services Intelligence. Pakistan regards the Haqqanis as an important force for protecting its interests in Afghanistan and therefore has been unwilling to move against them.

In 2007, Pakistani militants loyal to Baitullah Mehsud created the Tehreek-i-Taliban Pakistan and killed around 200 rival Pakistani leaders. They officially defined goals to establish their rule over Pakistan's Federally Administered Tribal Areas subsequently engaging the Pakistani army in heavy combat operations. Intelligence analysts believe that these TTP's attacks on the Pakistani government, police and army strained relations between the Pakistani Taliban and the Afghan Taliban. Afghan Taliban leader Mullah Omar asked the Tehreek-i-Taliban Pakistan in late 2008 and early 2009 to stop attacks inside Pakistan.

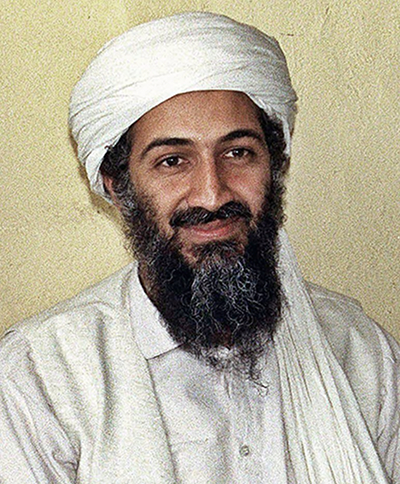
Osama bin Laden

In February 2009, the three dominant Pakistani Taliban leaders agreed to put aside their differences to help counter a planned increase in American troops in Afghanistan and reaffirmed their allegiance to Mullah Omar (and to Osama bin Laden). The agreement among the TTP leaders was short-lived, however, and instead of fighting alongside the Afghan Taliban the rival Pakistani factions soon engaged in combat with each other.

Many Afghan Taliban officials resent the TTP's violent campaign against Pakistan. Afghan Taliban and Pakistani Taliban have also conducted attacks against each other. On 10 October 2013, heavily armed Afghan Taliban attacked a Pakistani Taliban base in Kunar province of Afghanistan. The attack resulted in the death of three TTP commanders. However, TTP denied any losses. Again on 25 June 2016, Afghan Talibans and TTP clashed with each other in the Kunar province of Afghanistan. Afghan defense ministry claims that eight Pakistani Taliban militants and six Afghan Taliban militants were killed in the clash. Moreover, Some Sources also claim that TTP was behind the death of Nasiruddin Haqqani because TTP believed that Haqqani Network was behind the death of Hakimullah Mehsud as they disclosed whereabouts of Hakimullah Mehsud to US military in Afghanistan.

Since 2007, the TTP had been responsible for some of the worst terrorist attacks in Pakistan, including the 2014 Peshawar school massacre, and had targeted civilians and security forces in wave after wave of suicide bombings, improvised explosive device (IED) blasts, targeted killings and other forms of attacks. Following the TTP's Peshawar school massacre, the leaders of the Afghan Taliban condemned the Pakistani Taliban's actions on the school, saying it was "Un-Islamic".

However, despite the atrocities of the Pakistani Taliban, Pakistan was unable to persuade the Afghan Taliban to crack down on the Pakistani Taliban when the Afghan Taliban seized power in Kabul in August 2021. Instead, the Afghan Taliban mediated talks between Pakistan and the akistani Talibant hat led to the release of dozens of Pakistani Taliban prisoners in Pakistan. In November 2021, the Afghan Taliban helped facilitate a one-month ceasefire between the government of Prime Minister Imran Khan and the Pakistani Taliban. The ceasefire was not renewed when it expired, however, and the Pakistani Taliban's emir, Noor Wali Mehsud, asked his fighters to resume their attacks in Pakistan from 10 December 2021.

==== Cross-border controversy ====
In July 2011, after Pakistani missile attacks against Afghan provinces, Pakistani media reports alleged that senior Pakistani Taliban leaders were operating from Afghanistan to launch attacks against Pakistani border posts. According to the reports, Qari Zia-ur-Rahman hosted Faqir Muhammad in Kunar province while Sheikh Dost Muhammad, a local Afghan Taliban leader, hosted Maulana Fazlullah in Nuristan province. Faqir Muhammad, who claimed responsibility for a 4 July 2011 attack on a paramilitary checkpoint and for similar attacks in June 2011 on several border villages in Bajaur, stated during a radio broadcast, "Our fighters carried out these two attacks from Afghanistan, and we will launch more such attacks inside Afghanistan and in Pakistan." Afghan Taliban spokesman Zabihullah Mujahid strongly rejected the reports and denied the possibility of Pakistani Taliban setting up bases in Afghan Taliban-controlled areas. Tameem Nuristani, Governor of Afghanistan's Nuristan Province, told The Express Tribune that while the "Afghan Taliban have never carried out cross-border attacks in Pakistan," TTP militants may have "safe-havens" in Kunar and Nuristan in "areas where the government's writ does not exist".

In June 2012 a spokesman from the Pakistani Taliban's Malakand division revealed to The Express Tribune that TTP militants "regularly move across the porous border" to stage attacks against Pakistan but had only been in Afghanistan for a few months previously, despite to Pakistani claims that the Pakistani Taliban had long used Afghan territory as a staging ground.

Both governments blame the other for harbouring Taliban militants along the shared border. In 2009 Pakistan launched offensives to force the Tehreek-i-Taliban Pakistan from its territory in South Waziristan. Some analysts say the fighting pushed TTP militants to the Nuristan and Kunar provinces of Afghanistan, where they have regrouped to threaten Pakistani border regions. The Pakistani military claims "scanty presence" of NATO and Afghan forces along the border has enabled militants to use these areas as safe havens and launch repeated attacks inside Pakistan. Afghan officials state that the withdrawal of US forces out of parts of Kunar province beginning in 2010 created a power vacuum that militants filled. They point to the fact that the Afghan state in some areas has little control due to its war against the Afghan Taliban which are supported by Pakistan according to many international and Afghan institutions, analysts and officials. Pakistan vehemently denies this claim, although some Afghan Taliban commanders stated that their training was indeed overseen by "ISI officers in a camp in Pakistan" and that they were being armed by Pakistan to fight the Afghan state and international troops in Afghanistan.

=== Al-Qaeda ===
Flag of al-Qaeda

According to John Brennan, Barack Obama's chief counterterrorism adviser, Tehreek-e-Taliban Pakistan has close ties to al-Qaeda. In a 2009 interview with Fox News, Brennan said: "It's a group that is closely allied with al-Qaeda. They train together, they plan together, they plot together. They are almost indistinguishable." Ambassador-at-large Daniel Benjamin stated, "The TTP and Al Qaeda have a symbiotic relationship: TTP draws ideological guidance from Al Qaeda, while Al Qaeda relies on the TTP for safe haven in the Pashtun areas along the Afghan-Pakistani border... This mutual cooperation gives TTP access to both Al Qaeda's global terrorist network and the operational experience of its members. Given the proximity of the two groups and the nature of their relationship, TTP is a force multiplier for al-Qaeda." Ayesha Siddiqa of the Woodrow Wilson International Center for Scholars describes the TTP as "a franchise of al Qaeda" and attributes strong ties to al-Qaeda's acquisition of "a more local character over the years." Since the days of the Soviet era, some al-Qaeda operatives have established themselves in Pashtun areas and enmeshed themselves in the local culture.

In 2008, Baitullah Mehsud met with Ayman al-Zawahiri in South Waziristan. Prior to this meeting the Pakistani Taliban answered to the Afghan Taliban and pro-Pakistan militant commanders. At the time Pakistani authorities believed that Mehsud was in fact an al-Qaeda operative. In February 2009, Baitullah Mehsud, Hafiz Gul Bahadur and Maulavi Nazir released a statement in which they reaffirmed their allegiance to Mullah Omar and Osama bin Laden. In 2017, US Department of State alleged that TTP maintained operational ties with AQ, and that AQ members depended on TTP networks to obtain safe haven in the Afghanistan-Pakistan border regions.

=== Islamic State of Iraq and the Levant ===
The Islamic State – Khorasan Province (IS-KP) group was established by Hafiz Saeed Khan, a former commander of the Pakistani Taliban who pledged allegiance to Abu Bakr al-Baghdadi in May 2013. With the support of several TTP defectors who opposed Mullah Fazlullah, he formed the 'Tehreek e-Khilafat Pakistan' (TKP) splinter group in July 2014. According to Taliban sources, Saeed Khan was a Wahhabi educated at a Saudi-funded madrasa and had been involved in sectarian attacks against Hanafi 'ulema in Orakzai in preceding years.

In January 2015, TKP merged with 'Tehrik-e Khilafat Khorasan' (TKK) and 'Khilafat Afghan' groups to form the IS-KP. Due to his close relations with Abu Bakr al-Baghdadi, Hafiz Saeed Khan was appointed by the IS-central leadership as the governor of the Islamic State's Khorasan Province. Most IS-KP members were defectors from TTP, particularly from a dissident subgroup that was affiliated with the Salafist movement and opposed the Pakistani Taliban's leadership. According to a 2017 UN report, despite its open competition with the Pakistani Taliban, the Islamic State's core leadership attempted to collaborate with TTP and other militant factions in Afghanistan to "outsource" attacks due to its depleted manpower and lack of IS-KP's ground presence in Afghanistan. The report claimed that IS central sent funds to these groups and that IS-KP would have ceased to exist in Afghanistan without these funds.

According to Borhan Osman, a senior analyst at International Crisis Group (ICG), the Islamic State (IS) fighters who started the ISIS-K branch of ISIS were TTP militants who had long settled in Afghanistan. He claims that many members of the TTP fled Pakistan and went to seek refuge in Afghanistan as a result of military operations conducted by Pakistan security forces. In Afghanistan, National Directorate of Security (NDS) tried to persuade them to fight against Pakistan and the Afghan Taliban. Initially, only few of them fought against Pakistan and Afghan Talibans. However, after that TTP members in Afghanistan changed their allegiance to ISIS-K. Initially, because of their good relations with Afghan armed forces, the locals in Afghanistan thought that they were pro-Afghan government forces based. They also claimed that they were there to fight Afghan Talibans and Pakistan. However, after series of events, ISIS-K also turned hostile towards to Afghan government and locals.

=== Ghazi Abdul Rashid Shaheed Brigade ===
The Ghazi Abdul Rashid Shaheed Brigade, whose name is commonly shortened to Ghazi Brigade or Ghazi Force, emerged as a jihadi organisation after the Lal Masjid Operation of 2007. In 2009 the Ghazi Brigade worked closely with the TTP during military operations in the Swat Valley, and the two groups jointly planned attacks on western targets in Islamabad.

=== Islamic Movement of Uzbekistan ===
The TTP and the Islamic Movement of Uzbekistan (IMU) have a long history of collaboration. At one point prior to his appointment as TTP chief, Baitullah Mehsud lived with Tohir Yo'ldosh, the IMU's former leader, who became an ideological inspiration and offered the services of his 2,500 fighters to Mehsud. In April 2009 Muslim Khan listed the IMU among the TTP's allies in an interview with AP. The IMU posted a video online in September 2010 that featured footage of Yo'ldosh's successor, Abu Usman Adil, meeting with Hakimullah Mehsud and Wali-Ur-Rahman Mehsud. On 8 June 2014, the TTP accepted responsibility for conducting the Jinnah International Airport attack. The militants who participated in the attack were Uzbeks belonging to the IMU, and the TTP described the attack as a joint operation between TTP and IMU.

=== Punjabi Taliban ===
The Punjabi Taliban reportedly developed strong connections with the TTP, the Afghan Taliban, Tehreek-e-Nafaz-e-Shariat-e-Mohammadi and various other groups based in the North West Frontier Province (NWFP) and the Federally Administered Tribal Areas (FATA). The TTP and the Punjabi Taliban both claimed the 2009 Lahore bombing shortly after the attack. On 24 August 2013, a spokesman for the Tehreek-e-Taliban Pakistan claimed that the head of the Punjabi Taliban faction, Asmatullah Muawiya, had been stripped of his leadership for welcoming the Pakistani government's peace talks offer. Muawiya responded by saying that the Taliban central Shura (council) did not have the capacity to remove him because the Punjabi Taliban is a separate group. He added that his group has its own decision-making body to decide leadership and other matters. After a U.S. drone strike in Pakistan near Miranshah which killed 2 Punjabi Taliban members and interrupted a period of time with no drone strikes in which the Pakistani government held talks with the TTP and Punjabi Taliban, Muawiya announced that the Punjabi Taliban was ending their activities within Pakistan to focus on American soldiers in Afghanistan on 13 September 2014.

=== Other groups ===
US officials admitted to The New York Times that they found it increasingly difficult to separate the operations of the various Pakistani militant groups active in the tribal areas of Pakistan. Individuals and groups that are believed to have a supportive relationship with the TTP include:

- Harkat-ul Jihad Islami (HuJI), an al-Qaeda-linked terror group
  - Ilyas Kashmiri – killed
  - Qari Saifullah Akhtar – killed
- Jaish-e-Mohammed
- Lashkar-e-Jhangvi
- Lashkar-e-Taiba
- Sipah-e-Sahaba Pakistan

== Allegations of foreign involvement ==
The Pakistani military and civilian leadership have repeatedly alleged that the Indian intelligence agency RAW has been funding and training TTP members using a network of Indian consulates in Afghanistan along the Pakistani border. The allegations claim that when the TTP emerged, Afghan and Indian intelligence agencies were quick to seize the opportunity to infiltrate and utilise some of its elements, particularly Baitullah Mehsud's kin, against the Pakistani government and its armed forces. Pakistan claims that NDS (Afghanistan's intelligence agency) officials have openly admitted to their involvement with Tehreek-e-Taliban.

=== Afghanistan ===
Afghanistan has always been safe 'sanctuary' for Tehreek-e-Taliban. Mullah Fazlullah and his followers have been living in Afghanistan since 2009. In 2012, United States military and intelligence officials admitted that Mullah Fazlullah and his followers are living in Kunar and Nuristan provinces of Afghanistan. However, the U.S. military claimed that they are not targeting Mullah Fazlullah because he is not their priority as he is not affiliated with Al-Qaeda or with the insurgents who target U.S. or Afghan interest. Moreover, the ISAF advisers believe that 'Afghan Army is allowing them to operate in Afghanistan'. Later on in 2017, Afghanistan Chief Executive Abdullah Abdullah admitted that Tehreek-e-Taliban have a foothold in Afghanistan. However, he claimed that Afghan Government is not supporting them. Head of National Directorate of security (NDS), Asadullah Khalid posted a tweet on Twitter where he claimed that Tehreek-e-Taliban attack on Pakistan air force Badaber Camp was tit for tat. His claim highlights NDS support to Tehreek-e-Taliban. In 2013, United States military captured senior Tehreek-e-Taliban leader, Latif Mehsud, from an Afghan army and intelligence convoy. The Afghan convoy was guarding Latif Mehsud and taking him to National Directorate of Security (NDS) headquarters. They were intercepted by U.S. military in Logar Province of Afghanistan.

Senior Afghan analyst Borhan Osman claims that the Pakistan military offensive against the Tehreek-i-Taliban in Federally Administered Tribal Areas forced many members of the TTP to flee Pakistan and seek shelter in Afghanistan. Tehreek-i-Talibans were welcomed in Afghanistan and were treated as 'guests' by the Afghan Government and by the local people. Apart from Tehreek-i-Talibans, many other militants groups like Lashkar-e-Islam and other factions of Tehreek-i-Talibans were allowed to live in Afghanistan. Tribal elders and locals from Achin, Nazin and Kot testify that the militants were allowed free movement in the province and treatment in Government run hospitals. When moving outside their hub, they would go unarmed. National Directorate of Security (NDS) wanted them to fight against the Pakistani government and the Afghan Talibans. Initially, only few of them fought against Pakistan and Afghan Talibans. However, that changed after TTP members in Afghanistan changed their allegiance to ISIS-K. Once they pledged allegiance to ISIS-K, they claimed that they were there to fight Afghan Taliban and Pakistan. Because of their Anti-Afghan Taliban and Anti-Pakistan attitude, many locals believed that ISIS-K were a pro-government forces.

Pakistan claims that Afghan intelligence agencies are also involved in the support of TTP. Notably in 2014, a major TTP leader, Latif Mehsud, was caught by U.S. troops in Afghanistan while he was in a convoy escorted by Afghan Intelligence. American forces captured the TTP leader and handed him over to Pakistani authorities. This angered the Afghan President Hamid Karzai, since Mehsud had been recruited for peace talks according to Afghan authorities.

In 2016, Latif Mehsud gave a public video confession during which he claimed that Indian and Afghan intelligence agencies were responsible for supporting the TTP and other militant groups against Pakistan.

Since the Fall of Kabul in 2021, Pakistan has continued to accuse Afghanistan of supporting terrorism. Accusations have been made against the Taliban government for providing ground for destabilising Pakistan. In 2025, Ahmed Sharif Chaudhry, DG ISPR, urged Afghanistan not to allow its territory to be used as a base for activities that destabilise Pakistan, emphasising concerns over cross-border militancy. Hafiz Zia Ahmad Takal, spokesperson for Afghanistan's Foreign Ministry, denied the presence of armed groups in the country and asserted that the Islamic Emirate would not permit Afghan soil to be used to threaten neighbouring countries, the region, or the wider world.

=== India ===
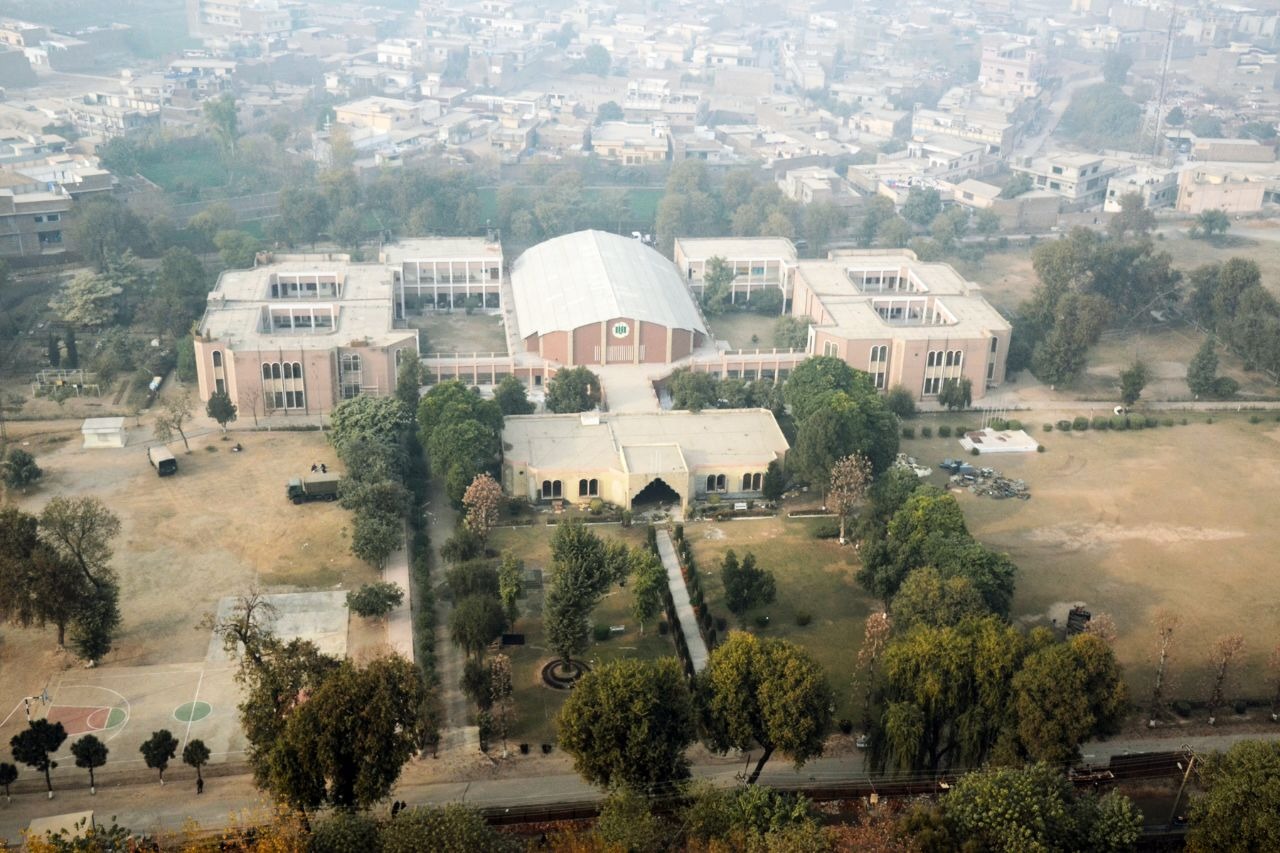
Army Public School, the location of the 2014 Peshawar school attack

In December 2014, after the Peshawar school massacre in which 132 children were killed, the Pakistani authorities again alleged that there was significant proof of Indian support of TTP to destabilise Pakistan and to counter Pakistan's Afghan policy. The Pakistan Army's official spokesman, Major General Asim Bajwa, said in the aftermath of the attack that, "India is funding Taliban in the Federally Administered Tribal Areas (FATA) and Balochistan," adding that "...a banned outfit cannot function on such a big scale unless foreign powers are funding it."

In 2016, Latif Mehsud gave a public video confession during which he claimed that Indian and Afghan intelligence agencies were responsible for supporting the TTP and other militant groups against Pakistan.

The Sindh Home Ministry in November 2015, wrote a letter to the Rangers and Police claiming Taliban had funded terrorist activities in Karachi. According to the letter, RAW funded around Rs 20 million for terrorist activities in Karachi. "The funding has been provided to banned Tehreek-e-Taliban Swat," the letter claimed.

== Claimed and alleged attacks ==
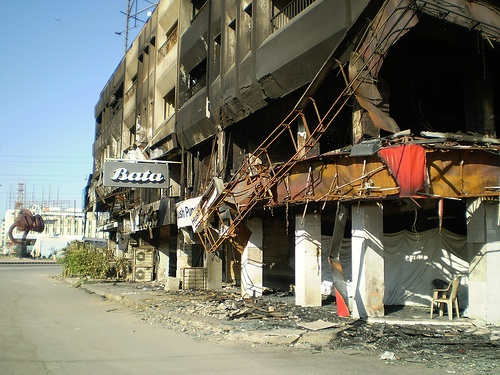
- Destruction in Karachi from rioting following the assassination of Benazir Bhutto
  The Pakistani government implicated the network in the December 2007 assassination of Benazir Bhutto although the group denies the charge. The U.S. Central Intelligence Agency also confirmed its belief of TTP's involvement in January 2008.
- The Tehreek-e-Nafaz-e-Shariate-Mohammadi (TNSM) claimed responsibility for a 23 December 2007 suicide bombing targeting a military convoy on behalf of the TTP. The blast in the Mingora area of the Swat Valley killed five soldiers and six civilians.
- TTP spokesman Maulvi Umar claimed responsibility of 2008 Dera Ismail Khan suicide bombing.
- TTP spokesman Maulvi Umar claimed that the group was responsible for 21 August 2008 suicide bomb attack on a military complex.
- TTP claimed responsibility for the 23 August 2008 Swat Valley bombing.
- Someone using the name Abdur Rehman claimed that the TTP was behind a 6 November 2008 suicide bombing that targeted tribal elders, who had gathered in the Bajaur tribal area to discuss efforts to coordinate with the government against the Pakistani Taliban. The blast took the lives of 16 and injured 31.
- On 13 November 2008, the TTP intercepted a military convoy along the Khyber Pass bound for NATO troops in Afghanistan.
- In telephone interviews with news media Mehsud claimed responsibility for the 30 March 2009 attack on the police training academy in Lahore. He told the BBC that the attack was in retaliation for continued missile strikes from American drones for which the Pakistani government shared responsibility. In the same interview Mehsud claimed two other attacks: a 25 March attack on an Islamabad police station and a 30 March suicide attack on a military convoy near Bannu.
- Mehsud claimed responsibility for the Binghamton shooting, saying they were in retaliation for continued missile strikes from American drones. The FBI denied this claim and stated this had nothing to do with Mehsud.
- Azam Tariq, spokesman of the TTP, claimed responsibility for a suicide bombing at a security checkpoint along the Pakistan-Afghan border near Torkham on 27 August 2009. Tariq said by telephone that the attack was the first in retaliation for the death of Baitullah Mehsud. Although the exact number of casualties was unknown, a doctor at a nearby hospital told Dawn News that they had received 22 bodies and local people working at the blast site said they had retrieved 13 bodies.
- Azam Tariq claimed responsibility for a suicide attack that killed five at the UN's World Food Programme Islamabad offices on 5 October 2009.
- The TTP, through Azam Tariq, claimed responsibility for the October 2009 attack on the army's headquarters at Rawalpindi. Tariq told the Associated Press that the attack was carried out by its "Punjabi faction" although the military insisted the attack originated in South Waziristan.
- The militant group claimed responsibility for three separate coordinated attacks in Lahore. 10 militants targeted buildings used by the Federal Investigation Agency (FIA), the Manawan Police Training School and the Elite Police Academy.
- The Pakistani Taliban, as well as the Afghan Taliban, claimed responsibility for the 30 December 2009 attack on Camp Chapman, a base of operations for the CIA, inside Khost Province, Afghanistan. The TTP released a video of Hakimullah Mehsud sitting next to the suicide bomber, Humam Khalil Abu Mulal al-Balawi, a Jordanian national who had been working with the CIA. In the video, al-Balawi states that the attack is in retaliation for the killing of Baitullah Mehsud. Many analysts doubted that the TTP acted alone.
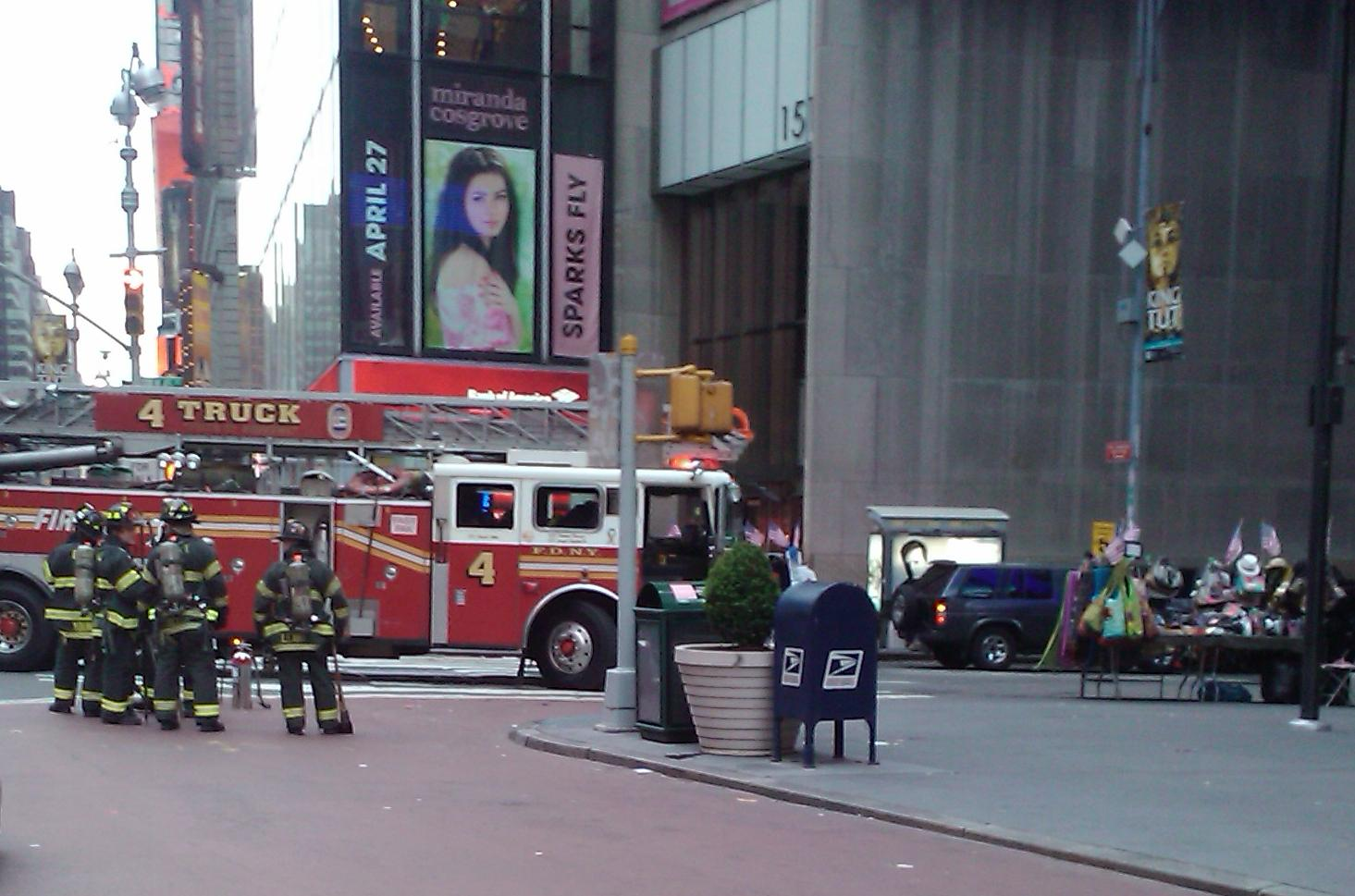
- Aftermath of the 2010 car bombing attempt in New York City's Times Square
  In a video posting on YouTube, Qari Hussain claimed that the TTP was behind the May 2010 attempted car bomb in New York City's Times Square.
- An attack on two minority mosques in Lahore during May 2010 was claimed by the Taliban.
- In July 2010, the TTP claimed responsibility for a suicide bombing in the Mohmand Agency. Two blasts occurred outside a senior government official's office as people gathered to receive relief supplies. As many as 56 people died and at least 100 suffered injuries.
- On 4 October 2010 the TTP claimed responsibility for an attack near Islamabad on fuel tankers bound for NATO troops in Afghanistan.
- In December 2010, the TTP claimed responsibility for a double suicide bombing upon administrative buildings in the Mohmand district's Ghalalnai village. The blast killed 40–50 people. The purported head of the TTP in Mohmand, Omar Khalid, claimed responsibility in a telephone call with the AFP. The military's chief spokesman, Major General Athar Abbas indicated to Al Jazeera that the TTP attackers were based in neighbouring Afghanistan.
- In December 2010, the TTP in South Waziristan kidnapped 23 tribesmen who had recently attended meetings with the Pakistani military.
- The TTP claimed responsibility for a 15 January 2011 attack on NATO fuel tankers likely bound for the border crossing town of Chaman. Azam Tariq told the AP, "We have assigned our fighters to go after NATO supply tankers wherever in Pakistan."
- On 31 January 2011 Azam Tariq, on behalf of the TTP, claimed responsibility of a suicide bombing in Peshawar that targeted police. The blast killed 5 people (3 police and 2 civilians) and injured 11.
- On 10 February 2011 the TTP claimed responsibility for a suicide bombing at an army compound in Mardan that killed at least 31 people. Azam Tariq told the AFP that the attack was in response to repeated U.S. drone attacks and military incursions in the tribal areas. He also threatened further attacks against "those who protect the Americans".
- The TTP released a video of the execution of a former ISI officer known as Colonel Imam. The TTP said they had carried out the murder on 17 February 2011. His body was found near Mir Ali, North Waziristan.
- On 8 March 2011 a car bomb explosion at a gas station in Faisalabad killed at least 32 and injured 125. Pakistani Taliban spokesman Ehsanullah Ehsan claimed responsibility and stated that the intended target was a nearby ISI office. He said that the attack was in retaliation for the death of a Taliban commander the previous year.
- On 9 March 2011 a suicide bomber attacked a funeral procession in Peshawar. The procession consisted of many anti-Taliban militiamen. Spokesman Ehsanullah Ehsan said the Pakistani Taliban had carried out the attack because the militiamen had allied themselves with the Pakistani government and, by extension, the United States.
- On 4 April 2011 two suicide bombers attacked a Sufi shrine in Dera Ghazi Khan, Pakistan. The bombings occurred while thousands of devotees were gathered for the annual Urs celebrations at the shrine. The attack left more than 50 people dead, as well as 120 wounded. The Pakistani Taliban are ideologically opposed to Sufism and claimed responsibility soon after the attacks.
- Pakistani Taliban claimed responsibility for two remotely detonated explosions that targeted two Pakistani Navy buses in Karachi on 26 April 2011.
- Spokesman Ehsanullah Ehsan claimed responsibility for a 28 April 2011 attack upon a Pakistani Navy bus in Karachi that killed 5.
- On 13 May 2011 the TTP claimed responsibility for a dual suicide bomb attacks on a Frontier Constabulary (FC) headquarters in Shabqadar, a town about 30 kilometers north of Peshawar, in Charsadda District. The attack killed more than 80 and injured at least 115 people. Most of the casualties were FC cadets. TTP spokesman Ehsanullah Ehsan claimed that the attack was retribution for the killing of Osama bin Laden.
- The TTP claimed responsibility for a 22 May 2011 attack on a naval station in Karachi.
- A suicide bomber drove an explosives-laden pickup truck into a Peshawar police building on 25 May 2011. The blast killed six and wounded 30. The Pakistani Taliban claimed responsibility.
- On 13 September 2011, five militants with assault rifles and rockets attacked a school bus, killing the driver, four boys aged 10 to 15, and wounding two seven-year-old girls. TTP claimed responsibility.
- On 1 December 2011 the TTP claimed responsibility for the death of Hashim Zaman, an anti-TTP tribal leader, who was killed in Hangu.
- TTP militants abducted 15 Pakistani paramilitary soldiers on 23 December 2011 from a fort in Mullazai. TTP spokesperson Ihsanullah Ihsan announced on 5 January 2012 that the militant group had executed the 15 paramilitary soldiers. The bodies were recovered close to a ravine and were mutilated according to locals. On 22 January 2012 the TTP released a video showing the execution of the 15 soldiers.
- Ahmed Marwat, a spokesman for a Jandola faction of the TTP, claimed to Reuters that Mohammed Merah, culprit of the Toulouse and Montauban shootings, had received TTP training in North Waziristan. However, Marwat denied the TTP's involvement in the shootings, and the head of French intelligence indicated they had no evidence that Merah belonged to any militant Islamist group. Pakistani officials allege that the TTP trained 85 French nationals between 2009 and 2012.
- The TTP Khyber Agency faction claimed responsibility for a 23 March 2012 bombing that targeted a mosque, run by Lashkar-e-Islam (LeI), in Kolay village of Tirah Valley. The blast killed more than a dozen people and injured at least six others. A TTP spokesman told reporters that the attacks against the LeI would continue.
- The TTP claimed responsibility for a 5 April 2012 suicide bombing targeting a police vehicle in Karachi. The blast killed two and injured nine.
- On 15 April 2012 the TTP claimed responsibility for a prison break in Bannu. 384 convicts escaped although many were later recaptured.
- A suicide bomb on 4 May 2012 killed 24 and wounded at least 45 in a Bajaur market . The TTP claimed responsibility.
- The Malakand branch of the TTP claimed responsibility for 24 June 2012 attacks on Pakistani security checkpoints near the Afghan border. 13 Pakistani troops were reportedly killed while 14 militants died. The Pakistani military alleged that the militants had crossed over from Afghanistan, but the TTP did not confirm in claiming responsibility. The TTP also denied that it had taken casualties.
- On 25 June 2012 the TTP claimed responsibility for gunfire on Aaj News TV, a local station in Karachi. Two were injured. Ehsanullah Ehsan said that the TTP was upset that it was not receiving coverage equal to that of the Pakistani military and government.
- On 9 July 2012 militants linked to the TTP attacked an army camp near Gujrat city that killed seven soldiers and a policeman. A pamphlet found at the scene indicated that attacks against government installations would continue as long as Pakistan allowed NATO to use its territory to transport supplies into Afghanistan.
- The TTP claimed responsibility for a 16 August 2012 attack on the Minhas Airbase in Kamra. The two-hour firefight resulted in the deaths of nine insurgents and two soldiers. Three other soldiers were wounded.
- On 16 August 2012 militants removed 22 Shiites from buses and executed them in Mansehra District. The Darra Adam Khel faction of the TTP claimed responsibility in a telephone interview with Reuters.
- The TTP claimed responsibility for the 9 October 2012 school-bus shooting of Malala Yousafzai, a young activist blogger, and two other schoolgirls. Supporting the attack, TTP spokesman Ehsanullah Ehsan stated "whom so ever leads a campaign against Islam and Shariah is ordered to be killed by Shariah." He added that it is "not just allowed … but obligatory in Islam" to kill such a person involved "in leading a campaign against Shariah... ."
- The TTP claimed responsibility for the 2014 Jinnah International Airport attack, which was carried out jointly with the Islamic Movement of Uzbekistan. The militants who participated in the attack were Uzbek foreigners.
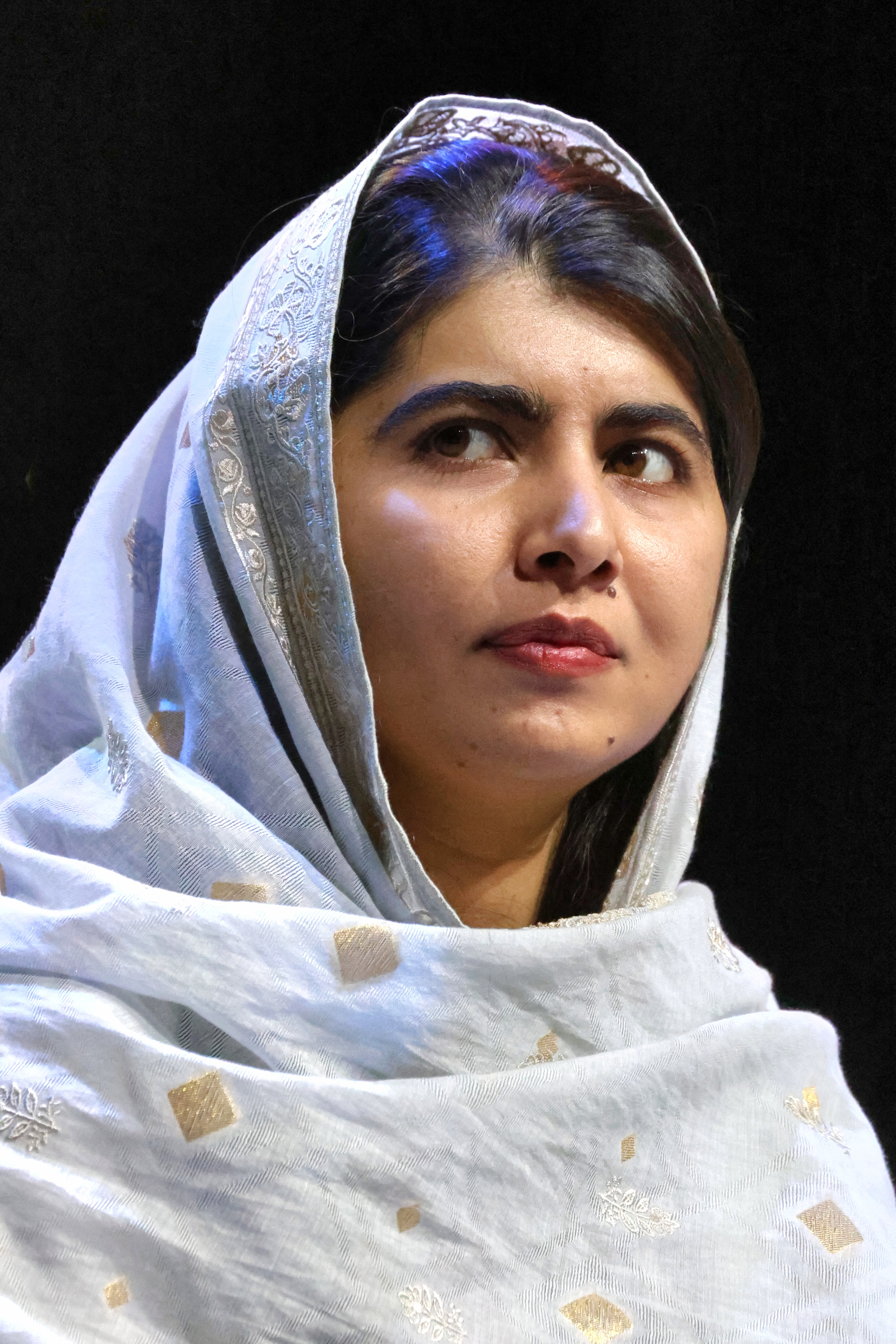
- Malala Yousafzai
  The TTP claimed responsibility for the 2014 Peshawar school attack which claimed 141 lives, including 132 school children between eight and 18 years of age, with the remaining nine fatalities being staff members of the school.
- TTP-affiliated organisations were held responsible for the 2015 Tonsa bombing, which targeted the office of Amjad Farooq Khan. Seven people were killed in the suicide bombing.
- A commander within the TTP claimed responsibility for the Bacha Khan University attack, in which at least thirty students and teachers were killed by as yet unidentified gunmen. However, a spokesperson for the Pakistan Taliban denied the group's involvement.
- On 20 January 2017. An IED placed in a vegetable crate, exploded at a vegetable market in Parachinar. The Tehreek-e-Taliban Pakistan claimed responsibility for the explosion. The blast killed at least 25 people and injured at least 87 others.
- Tehreek-e Taliban claimed responsibility for an attack on 2 February 2018 in which 11 soldiers, including a captain of the Pakistan Army were killed when a terrorist blew himself up during a volleyball match in Swat valley.
- Tehreek-i-Taliban claimed responsibility on 14 February 2018 for an attack in which, their gunmen killed 2 Frontier Constabulary soldiers in Quetta.
- On 11 October 2018 a roadside bomb targeted a vehicle belonging to the Pakistani Army in the Ladha Subdivision of South Waziristan, resulted in the deaths of three soldiers and five wounded, the Tehreek-i-Taliban Pakistan claimed responsibility for the attack.
- Tehreek-e Taliban Pakistan (TTP), claimed responsibility for the attack on 27 July 2019, In which Pakistan army said that six of its soldiers were killed when extremists from across the Afghan border opened fire on a patrol in the tribal district of North Waziristan.
- Militants of the Tehreek-e Taliban Pakistan claimed responsibility for an attack on 18 August 2019 in which least four people were killed and six were wounded in a roadside bomb blast that targeted a vehicle carrying members of a peace committee helping the Pakistani government in its efforts against the Taliban.
- On 14 September 2019, Tehreek-e Taliban Pakistan, claimed responsibility for the attack an attack on army patrolling party which resulted in the death of one Pakistani soldier. The patrolling party was attacked in Spinwam Subdivision in North Waziristan.
- Tehreek-e Taliban Pakistan, claimed responsibility for an IED blast in Quetta, on 15 November 2019 in which 3 Pakistani soldier were killed.
- Hizbul Ahrar, a splinter group from the TTP claimed responsibility for a bomb attack on 4 November 2019, that killed 4 Pakistani soldiers in North Waziristan.
- In the year 2020, TTP claimed responsibility for 79 attacks that killed 100 and injured at least 206. 80 Pakistan soldiers were also killed in these attacks.
- On 14 January 2021, TTP militants killed 4 Pakistan Soldiers in North Waziristan district.
- On 12 February 2021, TTP Gunmen ambushed an Army Check Post in South Waziristan, the attack lead to deaths of 4 soldiers.
- On 23 February 2021, four women aid workers were killed in North Waziristan. The attack was claimed by TTP.
- On 8 March 2021, TTP militants killed a police officer in Rawalpindi.
- On 21 April 2021, TTP claimed responsibility for a bomb explosion in the parking lot of the Serena Hotel in Quetta, killing four people and wounding 12 others. News Reports suggested that the target was the Chinese ambassador.
- On 5 May 2021, Four Pakistani soldiers were killed in an attack while they were working on fencing the Pakistan-Afghan border in Zhob, Balochistan. The attack was claimed by TTP.
- On 10 May 2021, 3 Pakistani soldiers were killed in an attack, claimed by TTP.
- On 22 May 2021, a Pakistani soldier was killed while working on fencing the Pakistan-Afghan border. Responsibility of attack was claimed by TTP.
- On 3 June 2021, TTP carried out an attack in Islamabad, in which two Islamabad Police cops were killed.
- On 13 July, Pakistani soldiers conducted a rescue operation in Kurram district to retrieve five telecommunications workers who were abducted by the terrorist. The five telecommunications workers were successfully rescued. Two Pakistani soldiers and three members of Tehreek-i-Taliban were killed in the operation.
- On 18 July 2021, TTP claimed responsibility for Twin attacks in which 3 Pakistan soldiers were killed and 4 were injured.
- Between 18 July and 30 July 2021, 24 Pakistan soldiers were killed in attacks claimed by TTP.
- On 1 August 2021, 2 Pakistani soldiers were killed and 9 were wounded in attacks by TTP in South and North Waziristan.
- On 8 August 2021, TTP carried out an attack on a military post in North Waziristan. 1 soldier were killed in that attack.
- On 13 August 2021, 1 Pakistan soldier was killed in South Waziristan, attack was claimed by TTP.
- On 18 August 2021, A Pakistan Army soldier was killed during an exchange of fire with terrorists at a checkpost in the South Waziristan district.
- On 5 September 2021, 4 FC soldiers were killed in Quetta when a TTP suicide bomber struck their Check post.
- On 6 February 2022, TTP claimed responsibility for an attack in which five Pakistani soldiers were killed in firing from Afghanistan.
- On 23 February 2022, 4 policemen were killed in after grenade attack in Peshawar. TTP claimed responsibility for this attack.
- On 23 March 2022, 4 Pakistani soldiers were killed by TTP militants in North Waziristan.

== Public opinion ==
=== Pakistan ===
According to a Pew Global Attitudes survey conducted in Pakistan in 2009, 85% of Pashtuns viewed the Pakistani Taliban as a serious threat to the country, compared to 80% of Muhajirs, 77% of Sindhis, and 71% of Punjabis. The survey highlighted that concerns about the Pakistani Taliban were more widespread than concerns about al-Qaeda. While 73% of respondents said the Pakistani Taliban posed a threat, only 61% thought al-Qaeda.

Regionally, people in Sindh and NWFP (now Khyber Pakhtunkhwa) were the most concerned, with 85% in each province identifying the Pakistani Taliban as a major threat. Al-Qaeda was seen as more threatening in Sindh (71%) than in NWFP (63%) or Punjab (59%).

==== Ex-FATA ====
According to the 2011–12 Understanding FATA survey, 64.3% of respondents in the former Federally Administered Tribal Areas (FATA) held an unfavourable view of the Pakistani Taliban, while 15% viewed them favourably and 14.3% said they did not know.

When asked how they would describe the Pakistani Taliban, the largest group (27.4%) characterised them as terrorists, followed by 24.2% who described them as “uneducated youth.” Additionally, 18.2% believed the Pakistani Taliban were foreign fighters, 5.4% saw them as defenders of Islam, and 4.5% as defenders of tribal traditions. Only 1.4% called them freedom fighters, while 4.2% expressed no opinion, and 0.4% gave other responses.

== Involvement in the Syrian Civil War ==
Logo of Umar Media

In July of 2013, the TTP's media wing, the Umar Media, had claimed to have set up training camps and to have sent hundreds of fighters to Syria to fight alongside the Syrian rebel groups and Islamist-Jihadist groups opposed to Bashar al-Assad such as the Al-Nusra Front, Ahrar al-Sham and Ansar al-Tawhid in an effort to strengthen ties with Al Qaeda against the government of Pakistan in the Khyber Pakhtunkhwa Insurgency. These Reports were later verified and confirmed independently.

== See also ==
- List of Deobandi organisations
- Tajikistani Taliban
- Ansar ul-Mujahideen
- Fedayeen al-Islam
- Haqqani network
- Insurgency in Khyber Pakhtunkhwa
- Belligerents in the Syrian civil war
- List of Militants fatality reports in Pakistan
- Pakistan and state-sponsored terrorism
- Pashtunistan
- Targeted killing
- Terrorism in Pakistan
