= Azam Tariq (Tehrik-i-Taliban Pakistan) =

Azam Tariq or Rais Khan (died 25 September 2016) was a terrorist, a spokesperson for the internationally designated terrorist group Tehrik-i-Taliban Pakistan (TTP) and the fourth-highest militant commander of the group. The TTP named him as its spokesman after his predecessor, Maulvi Umar, was arrested by Pakistani authorities in August 2009.

For his first act as spokesman, he claimed responsibility on behalf of the TTP for a suicide bombing at a security checkpoint along the Pakistan-Afghan border near Torkham on August 27, 2009. Tariq said by telephone that the attack was the first in retaliation for the death of Baitullah Mehsud, the militant group's first leader. Although the exact number of casualties was unknown, a doctor at a nearby hospital told Dawn News that they had received 22 bodies and local people working at the blast site said they had retrieved 13 bodies.

In August 2010 Tariq referred to the presence of foreign aid organizations in Pakistan providing relief in response to the massive 2010 flooding in the country as "unacceptable."

He had a 20 million rupee (US$190,740) bounty on his head.

In May 2014, he and other militants based in South Waziristan split from the main TTP and formed their own TTP faction led by another militant Khan Said Sajna. On 25 September 2016, Pakistani security sources stated that Tariq and his son, Shafiullah had been killed along with two other TTP leaders in airstrikes carried out by Afghan forces and NATO in Barmal District, Paktia Province of Afghanistan. The death of Tariq and his son was confirmed by Zeeshan Mehsud, a spokesman of TTP's Khan Said Sajna faction.
