= Pakistani airstrikes in Afghanistan =

Pakistani airstrikes in Afghanistan may refer to:

- 2022 Pakistani airstrikes in Afghanistan
- 2024 Pakistani airstrikes in Afghanistan
- 2025 Afghanistan–Pakistan conflict
- 2026 Pakistani airstrikes in Afghanistan
