= 2025 Afghanistan–Pakistan conflict =

2025 border conflict between Afghanistan and Pakistan

- Part of the Afghanistan–Pakistan border skirmishes and the Insurgency in Khyber Pakhtunkhwa
- Afghanistan (orange) and Pakistan (green)
Date	9–19 October 2025 (10 days)
Location	Afghanistan–Pakistan border
Result	Ceasefire

Belligerents
Afghanistan; Pakistani Taliban	Pakistan

Commanders and leaders
(Afghanistan) Hibatullah Akhundzada (Afghanistan) Mullah Yaqoob (Afghanistan) Sirajuddin Haqqani (Afghanistan) Qari Fasihuddin; Noor Wali Mehsud; Hafiz Gul Bahadur	(Pakistan) Asif Ali Zardari (Pakistan) Shehbaz Sharif (Pakistan) Asim Munir (Pakistan) Khawaja Asif (Pakistan) Zaheer Ahmad Babar (Pakistan) Mohsin Naqvi

Units involved
Afghan Armed Forces; Islamic National Army; 201 Khalid Ibn Walid Corps; TTP militia; HGB Group	Pakistan Armed Forces; Pakistan Army; Pakistan Air Force; Civil Armed Forces; Frontier Corps

Casualties and losses
Afghan figures: 43–48 killed; 16–18 wounded; TTP figures: 2 senior leaders killed; Pakistani claims: 250+ killed (including TTP); 1 Humvee destroyed; 6 tanks destroyed; Independent figures: At least 1 security compound destroyed; At least 1 military vehicle destroyed	Pakistani figures: 29 killed; 29 wounded; Afghan claims: 58 killed; 30 wounded
- 37 Afghan civilians killed, 425 injured 4 Pakistani civilians injured 5,000 Afghan civilians displaced

In the early hours of 9 October 2025, Pakistan carried out airstrikes in Kabul, Khost, Jalalabad, and Paktika, targeting the Pakistani Taliban (TTP) which it code named "Operation Khyber Storm". The group's leader, Noor Wali Mehsud, was the main target of the attack in Kabul, which occurred in Abdul Haq Square, but survived. On the night from 11 to 12 October, the Afghan Taliban launched an attack on multiple Pakistani military posts along the Afghanistan–Pakistan border in retaliation for the Pakistani airstrikes.

Following the attack, the Taliban’s Ministry of Defense announced the conclusion of their operation. However, Pakistani officials rejected the Taliban’s ceasefire declaration and continued their offensive, which was confirmed by a Taliban spokesman, noting that clashes persisted into the morning of 12 October. On the same day, reports emerged of Pakistani drone strikes in Kandahar and Helmand provinces, killing 19 Taliban fighters, though these casualties were not confirmed by Taliban officials. Both sides claimed to have inflicted heavy losses on each other and captured or destroyed several border posts. Satellite imagery of a Taliban military compound in Spin Boldak showed that it had suffered significant damage during the clashes.

Heavy fighting resumed on 15 October, with both sides accusing the other of initiating the violence. The fiercest fighting occurred around Spin Boldak, where civilian casualties were reported. Pakistan later announced “precision” airstrikes inside Afghanistan, which Afghan locals and media said hit Kabul and military sites in Kandahar, while the Taliban attributed the Kabul explosion to an oil-tanker blast. Following a 48-hour ceasefire, which was only set by Pakistan publicly, the Pakistani military carried out airstrikes in Paktika province after the truce expired. The Taliban accused Pakistan of targeting civilians in Paktika, while Pakistan rebutted that the strikes targeted militants belonging to the Hafiz Gul Bahadur Group, a faction of the TTP. On 19 October, Qatar announced that Afghanistan and Pakistan had agreed to a ceasefire after extensive Doha talks mediated by Qatar and Turkey. Under this ceasefire declaration, the Afghan government agreed to halt support for the TTP, while both sides pledged to refrain from targeting each other’s security forces, civilians, or critical infrastructure.

The United Nations Assistance Mission in Afghanistan (UNAMA) disclosed that 37 Afghan civilians had died and 425 others had been injured due to cross-border violence in Afghanistan.

== Background ==
Pakistan has accused the Afghan government in recent years of allowing the Tehreek-e-Taliban Pakistan (TTP), an offshoot of the Afghan Taliban, to use Afghan soil as a safe haven to plan and launch attacks across the border into Pakistan.

The issue has repeatedly strained diplomatic relations, with Kabul summoning Pakistani ambassadors on several occasions to protest alleged violations of Afghan sovereignty.

Cross-border operations and airstrikes inside Afghan provinces such as Paktika, Khost, Nangarhar, and Kunar have taken place in both 2024 and 2025 as Pakistan has repeatedly claimed that it has targeted anti-Pakistani militant hideouts.

== Pakistani airstrikes ==
Pakistan referred to its targeting of TTP (Pakistani Taliban) fighters and commanders in Afghanistan as "Operation Khyber Storm", which was primarily carried out by the Pakistan Air force.

== Timeline ==
=== 9 October ===
On 9 October 2025, at around 9:50 p.m. AFT, two loud explosions were heard in Kabul, particularly in the eastern sectors near Abdul Haq Square, District 8. Explosions and gunfire were heard in other parts of Kabul, leading residents to believe that an airstrike had taken place. Witnesses described hearing the sound of aircraft overhead shortly after the blasts. Subsequent reports said that the leader of the Tehreek-e-Taliban Pakistan/Pakistani Taliban (TTP), Noor Wali Mehsud was the target of the strike. Airstrikes were also reported to have taken place in Khost, Jalalabad, and Paktika. However, the Afghan government only confirmed airstrikes in Kabul and Paktika. A TTP official confirmed that the airstrike in Kabul killed at least two senior members of the group. Some sources claimed that TTP Emir Noor Wali Mehsud was killed in the strike; however, the TTP released an unverified voice recording purportedly from Mehsud, in which he states that he is alive. Mehsud later released a video showing that he was alive and escaped the strikes on him by the Pakistan Air Force (PAF).

Afghan journalists noted that the Afghan Taliban restricted access to the areas that had been struck by Pakistan.

=== 11 October ===
On the night of 11 October, the Afghan Taliban—through the Islamic National Army led by Qari Fasihuddin—launched an attack on multiple Pakistani military posts along the Afghanistan-Pakistan border. Afghan officials stated that the attack was in response to the Pakistani airstrikes in Afghanistan. The Afghan government claimed to have killed 58 Pakistani personnel, with 9 Afghan soldiers killed. Hours after the attack, the Afghan Ministry of Defense declared that the group’s operation against Pakistan had concluded. but warned that any future violations of Afghanistan’s airspace would provoke a "decisive response." Pakistani officials, however, stated that they had rejected the unilateral ceasefire declaration by the Afghan government and continued attacking military positions in Afghanistan. This was confirmed by a Taliban spokesman, who noted that attacks on Afghan military posts continued well into the morning of 12 October. The Pakistan Army claimed to have killed 200 Afghan and TTP forces, with 23 Pakistani soldiers killed and another 29 wounded in cross-border firing. Moreover, the Inter-Services Public Relations (ISPR), the media wing for the Pakistan Armed Forces, claimed that Afghan military posts adjacent to border areas such as Kurram, Chagai, and Zhob were destroyed. The ISPR added that an Afghan Humvee was destroyed in the operation, with the Pakistani flag raised over an Afghan border post in Angoor Adda.

=== 12 October ===
On 12 October, local sources in Afghanistan reported that a drone strike by Pakistan in Afghanistan's southern provinces of Kandahar and Helmand killed 19 Taliban fighters, including Commander Haji Nusrat. The casualties from the drone strike were not confirmed by Afghan officials.

The same day, Zabihullah Mujahid, spokesperson for the Afghan government, in a post on X stated that nine Afghan Taliban fighters had been killed and 16 to 18 had been injured during attacks on Pakistan's military posts. He further claimed that the Afghan Taliban killed 58 Pakistani soldiers, injured 30, and captured 25 Pakistani military posts. However, these claims were not confirmed by the Pakistani military or independent media. Pakistani state media claimed that its armed forces had captured 21 Afghan border posts, with the Taliban fighters at the posts being either killed or escaping and some allegedly surrendering in Kurram district. The Inter-Services Public Relations, the media wing for the Pakistan Armed Forces, released aerial footage of its strike on cross-border Afghan positions. BBC Verify confirmed significant damage to an Afghan security compound in Spin Boldak following a Pakistani airstrike.

The Torkham border crossing and Chaman border crossing in Balochistan were sealed by Pakistani forces, halting any trade or commerce through those routes.

Pakistani Prime Minister Shehbaz Sharif vowed a "strong retaliation" to Afghan clashes with Pakistani forces. Pakistani Interior Minister Mohsin Naqvi stated that Afghanistan will receive a "befitting reply like India," referring to Pakistan's earlier conflict with India in May of that year in which despite a ceasefire,Pakistan had tried to claim a victory. Pakistani Foreign Minister Ishaq Dar expressed his concerns at the clashes between Afghan and Pakistani forces along the border. Asim Munir, Pakistan's chief of the army staff, visited the Afghan border and inspected frontline positions.

Afghan Foreign Minister Amir Khan Muttaqi announced a temporary cessation of hostilities following requests from Qatar and Saudi Arabia during a press conference in New Delhi.

=== 14 October ===
On the night from 14 to 15 October, an exchange of fire occurred near Kurram. According to Pakistani state sources, Afghan and TTP forces "opened unprovoked fire" and Pakistani forces responded.

=== 15 October ===
In the early hours of October 15, clashes erupted between Afghan and Pakistani forces along the Afghanistan-Pakistan border, with both sides accusing each other of being the aggressor. According to the spokesperson for the Afghan Taliban, the clashes in Spin Boldak led to at least 12 Afghan civilian deaths, with more than 100 others reported injured. However, local sources from Kandahar reported higher civilian casualties, with at least 29 killed and 122 wounded. At least 80 women and children were among the wounded according to a district hospital official. Taliban spokesperson also claimed that Afghan fighters had captured and destroyed several border posts in Spin Boldak, inflicting casualties on Pakistani security personnel, though no specific death toll was provided. Pakistani officials rejected Afghan claims, dismissing them as propaganda, and stated that they had killed 15 to 20 Taliban fighters and injured several others. Pakistani officials also reported that 6 Pakistani security personnel were killed and 4 civilians were injured during the clashes. In Kurram, Pakistani officials stated that they had destroyed eight positions—including six tanks—belonging to Afghan forces, and had killed 25 to 30 fighters from both the Afghan Taliban and the TTP in a counterattack.

On the same day, Pakistani officials announced that they had carried out a series of precision airstrikes inside Afghanistan targeting several military installations. According to the officials, the strikes struck key hideouts of the Taliban and TTP, killing dozens of foreign and Afghan operatives. The airstrike in Kabul specifically targeted the headquarters and leadership of anti-Pakistan militants, according to Pakistani officials. According to Afghan media sources, Pakistan’s airstrikes in Kandahar struck the Fourth and Eighth Taliban Brigades as well as the Fifth Border Corps, reportedly killing between 15 and 20 Taliban fighters.

Pakistan released video footage of its air attacks on Afghan military positions during the conflict, including the Durrani Camp, Manojba Camp Battalion Headquarters, Manojba Camp-2, and the Ghaznali Headquarters adjacent to the Nushki district in Balochistan province. Radio Television Afghanistan (RTA) confirmed Pakistani drone strikes in Spin Boldak. BBC Verify also confirmed a video of a Pakistani munition striking an Afghan military vehicle in Spin Boldak. Abdul Ghafoor Abed, a journalist for RTA, was killed and another individual was injured during crossfire in Spin Boldak. In Kandahar, locals reported airstrikes on an Afghan military base and two additional strikes on targets in the Aino Mina settlement. Afghan security personnel sealed off access to Aino Mina, preventing anyone from entering the area. Afghan state media reported that a number of civilians were killed in the Pakistani airstrikes in Kandahar.

In Kabul, a resident reported hearing four large explosions, with blasts continuing intermittently every few minutes. Several residents reported hearing the sound of fighter jets flying overhead just moments before the explosions. Residents state that the Lulu Tower, a residential building, and another building were targeted in the airstrikes. According to locals, some Taliban officials may have been living in the tower's apartments. Afghan officials dismissed any new reports airstrikes in Afghanistan and attributed the explosions to an oil tanker blast.

The National Resistance Front of Afghanistan conducted an attack on 15 October, assassinating Qari Bashir, the deputy head of the Taliban's Propagation of Virtue and the Prevention of Vice in Kunduz.

=== 16 October ===
According to according to local health officials, the death toll from clashes in Spin Boldak rose to 40 on the Afghan side. At least 171 others remained injured, with several of them in critical condition. According to Afghan media, it remains unclear whether any Taliban military personnel were among the dead. However, reports from southern Afghanistan suggest that the bodies of several Taliban fighters were transferred to Spin Boldak and nearby districts. The Afghan government did not release any casualty figures.

=== 17 October ===
The United Nations Assistance Mission in Afghanistan (UNAMA) disclosed that 37 civilians had died and 425 others had been injured due to cross-border violence in the past week. The provinces of Paktia, Paktika, Khost, Kunar, Kandahar, and Helmand saw the highest number of casualties.

On the same day, following the expiration of a 48-hour ceasefire, Pakistan carried out airstrikes in Paktika Province. According to Taliban officials, the airstrikes targeted three locations, with one strike hitting a house and killing 10 people. The victims included local cricket players, women, and children. The International Cricket Council (ICC) expressed sorrow over the deaths of three Afghan cricketers, condemned the violence, and stood in solidarity with the Afghanistan Cricket Board (ACB), which announced its withdrawal from the 2025 Pakistan T20I Tri-Nation Series that was to be played throughout November in respect for the victims. An Afghan spokesman confirmed the airstrikes, claiming they targeted civilians, and said Kabul reserved the right to respond, but had instructed fighters to hold back out of respect for the negotiating team. However, according to Pakistani officials, the airstrikes targeted hideouts of the militant belonging to the Hafiz Gul Bahadur Group, killing dozens of armed fighters.

== Ceasefire ==
On 19 October, Qatar announced that both the Afghan and Pakistani governments agreed to a ceasefire after extensive talks in Doha, with mediation from Saudi Arabia, Qatar, and Turkey. According to the agreement, the Afghan government agreed to cease support for groups that carry out attacks against Pakistan, while both sides would "refrain from targeting each other’s security forces, civilians, or critical infrastructure."

== Impact ==
On 29 October, after the first round of peace talks held in Istanbul failed, Pakistan threatened to 'obliterate' the ruling Taliban government. Pakistan’s Information Minister Attaullah Tarar stated that the dialogue "failed to bring about any workable solution," despite mediation by both Turkey and Qatar. Pakistani Defence Minister Khawaja Asif stated that Afghan negotiators backpaddled on an agreement. An Afghan official said that Pakistan made "unreasonable demands" during the talks and did not address Afghan concerns regarding alleged cross-border airspace violations and the use of Pakistani territory by militant groups to carry out attacks in Afghanistan.

On 30 October, after the resumption of peace talks, it was decided that the truce would extend for another week. On 5 November, ahead of the third round of talks in Istanbul, Khawaja Asif reiterated that there'd be escalation and war if the talks fail. There were brief exchanges of fire along the border on 7 November which left 5 people dead and 6 injured on Afghan side. On 8 November, peace talks broke down again but the ceasefire remained in effect. Zabihullah Mujahid stated that negotiations failed because Pakistan had demanded Afghanistan take responsibility for Pakistan’s internal security, which he said was beyond Afghanistan’s capacity. Rahmatullah Najib, deputy interior minister and a member of the negotiation team, stated that talks failed because Pakistan, backed by mediators, requested a Fatwa by Hibatullah Akhundzada declaring all ongoing warfare in Pakistan illegitimate. He said the Taliban delegation did not reject the idea outright but insisted that only the Dar al-Ifta could issue such a ruling, and that any Fatwa would be based solely on Islamic law, not foreign pressure. Najib acknowledged that this conditional stance was unacceptable to Pakistan and contributed to the talks ending without concrete results. Khawaja Asif noted that the ceasefire would continue provided no attacks originated from Afghan territory. However, on 11 November, after declaring a "state of war" over a bombing incident in Islamabad, Asif stated that placing hope in negotiations with the 'rulers in Kabul' would be a mistake, accusing Afghanistan of not preventing the attacks while Afghanistan denied any responsibility. In an interview with a Pakistani newspaper, Asif stated that Pakistan’s efforts to stabilize its strained relationship with the Taliban depend on obtaining a written guarantee from the Taliban to halt cross-border attacks, and that this commitment should be backed by regional powers, including Turkey, Saudi Arabia, the United Arab Emirates, Iran, China, and Qatar. He later stated that he had no positive expectations left from Taliban.

On 3 December, mediation attempts by Saudi Arabia failed.

=== Sports relations ===
In response to the death of three local cricketers in Paktika Province, the Afghanistan Cricket Board (ACB) withdrew from a T20I tri-nation series between the Afghanistan, Pakistan, and Sri Lanka national cricket teams which was set to be hosted in Pakistan. Despite Afghanistan's withdrawal, the Pakistan Cricket Board (PCB) announced that Zimbabwe would replace Afghanistan, simply stating that it had been notified of "Afghanistan's inability" to partake in the series. The PCB further stated that the series would continue as scheduled, with games to be played in Lahore and Rawalpindi.

=== In Afghanistan ===
During the clashes, the Taliban shut down Shamshad TV, a private broadcaster in Kabul, accusing it of failing to "adequately" cover the recent border fighting with Pakistan and of not defending the "Taliban’s position." The suspension, following a direct order from the Taliban’s General Directorate of Intelligence, has raised concerns about media freedom in Afghanistan. Shamshad TV, one of the few outlets providing relatively independent coverage of regional and political developments, was criticized for not aligning with the Taliban’s narrative. Media organizations such as the Afghanistan Journalists Center (AFJC) and the Afghanistan Media Support Organization (AMSO) condemned the move as blatant interference in the press and called for the reversal of the decision, stressing that such actions violate media independence and freedom of expression. Shamshad TV has yet to comment on the shutdown.

On 24 October, Afghan Supreme Leader Hibatullah Akhundzada ordered a dam to be constructed on the Kunar River, directing water away from Pakistan in response to the conflict. However, six months later, construction of proposed Kunar Dam had not started and no formal progress update had been released regarding the status of dam. The project also faces uncertainty as Kunar River’s flow originates in Pakistan (Chitral), Pakistan can regulate, restrict, or divert upstream water, potentially limiting the project’s viability and reducing downstream flows. On 14 November, Afghan government announced that traders have a three-month deadline to shift to other trade routes away from Pakistan, particularly shifting trade to Iran's Chabahar Port due to a 30% cut in port tariffs for Afghan cargo. Zalmai Azimi, a board member of the Nangarhar Chamber of Commerce, stated that many traders are unable to afford alternative trade routes. He noted that the Karachi route had been the most affordable and reliable transit option for Afghan goods, ensuring timely delivery. Pakistani Defence Minister Khawaja Asif told Geo News that Afghanistan's decision brings no economic harm to Pakistan. An investigation by an Afghan media outlet revealed that alternative trade routes are significantly more expensive, with transit through Iran’s Chabahar port costing twice as much per container as Pakistan's Karachi port. The media outlet noted that despite political tensions, Karachi remains Afghanistan’s fastest and cheapest trade route.

According to World Bank, Afghanistan's exports rose in October despite the closure of border by Pakistan, with World Bank attributing the increase to higher exports to India and Uzbekistan. The Taliban's clashes with Pakistan also led to a surge in its popularity in Afghanistan.

The prolonged closure of the Afghanistan-Pakistan border resulted in increase in inflation in Afghanistan, and economists warn that continued closures could worsen shortages of essential goods such as food and medicine. The closure has already disrupted trade and contributed to sharp increase in prices of food, fuel, medicine, and construction materials across the country. In Kabul, residents said that staples such as flour, rice, cooking oil, and vegetables have become much more expensive, and frequent price changes combined with limited market oversight has made it difficult for families to afford basic goods. With unemployment already high and work opportunities scarce, many households had to cut back on consumption, buy smaller quantities, or go without some essential items. The construction sector was also hit hard, as cement shortages and rising costs forced many builders to halt projects, leaving laborers without work. The continued closure of border also forced containers of aid meant for Afghanistan to remain at the border or at Karachi port despite a humanitarian crisis impacting more than 20 million Afghans.

According to UNAMA, victims of shelling and Pakistani airstrikes and their family members reported permanent disabilities, including blindness, amputations, and long-term psychological trauma. Hundreds of homes and businesses were damaged or destroyed. In Spin Boldak, several families were displaced multiple times due to repeated shelling.

=== In Pakistan ===
After the eight-day military standoff, Pakistan sharply increased the deportation of Afghan migrants, expelling nearly 5,900 individuals on 29 October and more than 7,300 the previous day, according to Afghanistan’s Taliban-run Commission for Refugees and Repatriation. Rights groups warned that the mass expulsions could exacerbate Afghanistan’s humanitarian crisis.

Pakistan kept its border with Afghanistan indefinitely closed and demanded security guarantees from Taliban as a condition for reopening it.

Following the halt of Pakistan-Afghanistan trade, food inflation in Pakistan, particularly in Islamabad and Rawalpindi, surged due to disrupted imports and stranded shipments at the border. The cost of fruits, vegetables, and other essential food items rose sharply. After the border closure, Peshawar markets, particularly Afghan-operated ones, saw a sharp decline in activity, with significantly fewer shoppers and stranded trucks carrying goods. The trade suspension disrupted commerce and affected the livelihoods of both Pakistani and Afghan traders.

China's economic interests in Pakistan were threatened. According to the Middle East Institute, the broader Chinese planning in the region encompassing Afghanistan and Pakistan was adversely affected as result of continued hostilities.

== Analysis ==
Ishaq Atmar, a German-based expert on Afghan affairs, told Radio Azadi that the timing of the attack – which occurred during the groundbreaking visit by the Afghan Taliban Foreign Minister Amir Khan Muttaqi to India – "could not be a coincidence", adding that "Pakistan saw this as an opportune time to send a clear message to India, the Taliban government, and other countries" observing regional affairs.

Ibraheem Bahiss, a senior analyst for the International Crisis Group, stated that both Pakistan and Afghanistan aim to avoid a wider conflict, prioritizing de-escalation along the border. He noted that the Afghan Taliban are unlikely to escalate due to Pakistan's superior firepower. Their limited retaliation, he added, was mainly intended to reassure their domestic audience and demonstrate control.

According to the BBC, satellite images and verified drone footage revealed significant damage in Afghanistan amid the ongoing border clashes with Pakistan. BBC analysts verified a video, purportedly filmed between 11 and 12 October, showing three buildings with blue slanted roofs being struck, followed by a large cloud of smoke. Social media users claimed the footage depicted a Pakistani drone strike on a “Taliban camp” in the border city of Spin Boldak. BBC reporters confirmed that the buildings targeted were part of a Taliban border security compound. Further satellite imagery from 14 October showed extensive damage to the same buildings, consistent with the impact observed in the verified video.

According to Atif Mashal, a former Afghan diplomat, and Aziz Amin, a former Afghanistan government official writing for The Diplomat, Pakistan’s airstrikes on Afghanistan, including strikes on Kabul, reflect a broader strategy by the Pakistani military to project strength externally in response to growing internal instability. They highlight the historical pattern of Pakistan's military using external aggression to distract from domestic issues, particularly the rise of the TTP, which has roots in Pakistan's past support of militant groups. The authors suggest that Pakistan's coercive tactics, including airstrikes and threats, have undermined diplomatic efforts, strained relations with Afghanistan, and led to an increasing sense of regional isolation.

Afghanistan International, citing sources, reported that Taliban leaders close to Hibatullah Akhundzada were concerned that continued conflict with Pakistan could deplete their heavy weapons, making Qatari–Turkish mediation an attractive option to end the fighting. After Pakistani airstrikes on Afghan territory, Akhundzada delegated full authority for retaliatory action to a military commission in Kabul led by Defense Minister Mullah Yaqub Mujahid. Despite the ongoing fighting, Akhundzada favored limited, defensive responses and avoided direct meetings with military officials. Akhundzada did not expect the war with Islamabad to expand and Pakistan to repeat attacks on Afghan territory. Amid the escalation, he authorized a delegation led by Yaqub to Doha to negotiate a ceasefire with Pakistan under Qatari and Turkish auspices.

== Reactions ==
Officials from Pakistan and Afghanistan blamed each other for initiating the conflict. Following the deadly clashes, several countries, including the United Nations, called on both sides to de-escalate tensions and resolve their issues through diplomatic means. A report from Afghanistan International stated that, so far, no country has condemned Pakistan's attacks on Afghanistan.

=== Afghanistan ===
The government launched an investigation into the blasts, with spokesman Zabihullah Mujahid saying no damage or casualties have been confirmed. The day after the attack, the Afghan Ministry of Defence blamed Pakistan for the Kabul and Paktika blasts, without sharing any details. Afghanistan also accuses Pakistan of "violating Kabul's sovereign territory". The Taliban Interior Minister, Sirajuddin Haqqani stated that Afghanistan would respond forcefully to any aggression, accusing Pakistan of spreading "propaganda and provocations." He said the TTP issue was Pakistan’s internal matter and urged Islamabad to resolve it domestically. Referring to the peace talks, Haqqani stressed that Taliban would not tolerate violations of Afghan territory.

=== Pakistan ===
Ahmed Sharif Chaudhry, spokesperson for the Pakistan Armed Forces, did not confirm or deny whether Pakistan conducted the airstrikes on Kabul. Chaudhry stated that "Afghanistan is being used as a base of operations against Pakistan, and there is proof and evidence of that," adding that "the necessary measures that should be taken to protect the lives and property of the people of Pakistan will be taken and will continue to be taken." Pakistan also blames "Indian proxies" in Afghanistan for terror attacks. Pakistan's President, Asif Ali Zardari had strongly condemned Afghanistan's counterattack saying that "Afghanistan has turned away from the just freedom struggle of the oppressed people of Indian-occupied Jammu and Kashmir", which he claimed was "an injustice to both history and the Muslim Ummah".

==== Non-state actors ====
- Pakistani Taliban: A TTP official confirmed that the airstrike in Kabul killed at least two senior members of the Tehrik-i-Taliban Pakistan (TTP). The TTP official also released an unverified voice recording purportedly from Mehsud, in which he claimed to be alive. Mehsud later made a video showing that he was alive and escaped the strikes on him by the Pakistan Air Force. Mehsud responded that he was not in Afghanistan and the Pakistani report was "propaganda". The Pakistani Taliban vowed vengeance for Pakistan's airstrikes across Afghanistan.
- National Resistance Front of Afghanistan: In an official statement, the NRF said "The National Resistance Front applauds and supports Pakistan's airstrikes in Kabul and Paktia provinces. According to international law and principles، Pakistan has the right to target terrorists in Afghanistan and ensure the security of its people."
- Afghanistan Freedom Front: Daoud Naji, the head of the political committee, stated that Afghan Taliban are sacrificing Afghan people to protect TTP. He further emphasized that the closure of borders has caused significant suffering for both the Afghan public and businessmen.

=== International reactions ===
- (Islamic Republic of Afghanistan) Afghan Permanent Mission to the UN: Acting Permanent Representative Naseer Ahmad Faiq, described Pakistan’s airstrikes on Kabul and Kandahar as a serious breach of international law and Afghanistan’s territorial integrity. He said, “These actions are the result of decades of Pakistan’s interference and misguided policies, the consequences of which the people of Afghanistan have endured for years”.
- China: The Ministry of Foreign Affairs expressed its concern at the conflict, and hoped "that both countries will prioritise the bigger picture, exercise calm and restraint, and resolve their concerns." Spokesperson Lin Jian added that China was ready to "play a constructive role" in improving bilateral ties between Afghanistan and Pakistan.
- India: The Ministry of External Affairs expressed its support for Afghanistan's sovereignty and territorial integrity while strongly criticizing Pakistan's regional actions. Ministry of External Affairs spokesperson Randhir Jaiswal stated that Pakistan continues to host terrorist organizations, sponsor terrorist activities, and blame its neighbors for "internal failures." He added, "Pakistan is infuriated by Afghanistan exercising sovereignty within its own borders. But India is fully committed to the territorial integrity and independence of Afghanistan." Indian officials emphasized that peace in Afghanistan can only be achieved by dismantling terrorism originating from Pakistani soil and eliminating violent extremism.
- Iran: Foreign Minister Abbas Araghchi called on Afghanistan and Pakistan "to exercise restraint" amid ongoing clashes. "Our position is that both sides must exercise restraint," Araghchi said during a live interview with state television, adding that "stability" between the countries "contributes to regional stability".
- Qatar: The Ministry of Foreign Affairs urged both sides to prioritise dialogue, diplomacy, and restraint, and to work towards containing differences in a manner that helps to reduce tension and avoid escalation, in order to achieve regional security and stability. The foreign ministry reiterated Qatar's support for all regional and international efforts aimed at strengthening international peace and security, and affirmed its commitment to ensuring security and prosperity for the people of the two countries.
- Russia: The Ministry of Foreign Affairs urged both sides to exercise restraint and said it was monitoring the events, concluding that the "situation is stabilising." The Foreign ministry concluded that it welcomes this process.
- Saudi Arabia: The Ministry of Foreign Affairs issued a statement saying: "The kingdom calls for restraint, avoiding escalation, and embracing dialogue and wisdom to contribute to reducing tensions and maintaining security and stability in the region. The kingdom affirms its support for all regional and international efforts aimed at promoting peace and stability, and its continued commitment to ensuring security, which will achieve stability and prosperity for the brotherly Pakistani and Afghan peoples."
- United States: President Donald Trump told reporters on Air Force One, while he was enroute to Israel, that he heard "there's a war now going on between Pakistan and Afghanistan." On the sidelines of the 2025 ASEAN Summit in Malaysia, Trump stated that he will get the conflict solved "very quickly."

== See also ==
- 2023 Afghanistan–Iran clash
- 2024 Iran–Pakistan conflict
- 2025 India–Pakistan conflict
- 2026 Afghanistan–Pakistan conflict
- Afghanistan–Pakistan relations
- Pakistani airstrikes in Afghanistan
