= 2011 Chitral cross-border attacks =

Terrorist incident in Pakistan

Date	27 August 2011
Location	Chitral district, Khyber-Pakhtunkhwa, Pakistan
Result	Deterioration of Afghanistan-Pakistan relations

Belligerents
Pakistan	Tehrik-e Taliban Pakistan

Casualties and losses
26 soldiers killed 10 policemen killed	25 militants killed

The 2011 Chitral cross-border attacks were a series of attacks that occurred in the Chitral district of Khyber-Pakhtunkhwa, Pakistan. The attacks were carried out by the Tehreek-e-Taliban Pakistan (TTP) who crossed from Afghanistan.

== Background ==
The Tehreek-e-Taliban Pakistan (TTP), had escalated their attacks in the western regions of Pakistan bordering Afghanistan. Numerous Pakistani Taliban fighters had sought refuge in Afghanistan as a response to military operations conducted by the Pakistani Army. In Afghanistan, they joined forces with allies to regroup and pose a threat to the border regions of Pakistan.

== The attacks ==
On 28 August 2011, 300 Taliban fighters infiltrated from Afghanistan and carried out a pre-dawn assault on Pakistani paramilitary posts situated in the Chitral district of Khyber-Pakhtunkhwa. This attack commenced by hundreds of Taliban fighters at approximately 4 am and persisted throughout the day. The death toll for the Pakistani Army resulted from this cross-border attack increased to 32–36, with the recovery of six additional bodies belonging to Chitral scouts.

The assault was aimed at checkpoints located in the border village of Arandu in the Chitral district, situated directly across from Afghanistan's Nuristan province. These militants were believed to be affiliated with Pakistani Taliban factions that had previously sought to gain control in the Swat Valley. However, they were compelled to escape into Afghanistan in 2009 due to a successful military operation conducted by the Pakistani military.

== Protest ==
Pakistan formally registered a protest with the Afghan government regarding attacks. The Afghan Charge d’Affairs was summoned to the Foreign Ministry to convey this protest. Pakistan expressed its expectation that both ISAF (International Security Assistance Force) and the Afghan National Army would take concrete measures to prevent such incursions by militants and bolster border security to prevent such incidents from recurring.

== See also ==
- 2023 Chitral cross-border attacks
