= Battle of Damascus =

The Battle of Damascus, Siege of Damascus, or similar names may refer to:

- Siege of Damascus (613), a siege during the Byzantine–Sasanian War of 602–628
- Siege of Damascus (634), a siege during the Muslim conquest of Syria
  - The Siege of Damascus, a 1720 play by John Hughes about this battle
- Capture of Damascus (971)
- Siege of Damascus (1129) during the Crusade of 1129
- Siege of Damascus (1148), a failed siege during the Second Crusade
- Siege of Damascus (1174), a siege that took place between the Ayyubid Sultanate and Zengid dynasty
- Siege of Damascus (1229), a siege during an Ayyubid civil war
- Battle of Damascus (1260) during the Mongol invasion of Syria
- Siege of Damascus (1400), during the conquests of the Timurid Empire
- Capture of Damascus (1918), during World War I
- Capture of Damascus (1920), a siege during the Franco-Syrian War
- Battle of Damascus (1941), during World War II
- Rif Dimashq clashes (November 2011–March 2012), during the Syrian civil war
- Battle of Damascus (2012), during the Syrian civil war
- Damascus offensive (2013), during the Syrian civil war
- Fall of Damascus (2024), during the Syrian civil war
