= Khalid Mehsud =

- خالد محسود
- Born: 1975 or 1977; South Waziristan, FATA, Pakistan
- Died: 8 February 2018 (aged 40–43); North Waziristan, FATA, Pakistan
- Other name: Khan Said Sajna
- Occupations: Militant, deputy head of Tehrik-i-Taliban Pakistan
- Military career
- Known for: Leading the Mehsud faction of the Taliban
- Conflicts: Insurgency in Khyber Pakhtunkhwa

Khalid Mehsud (alias Khan Said Sajna) (1975 or 1977 – 8 February 2018) was a militant and the deputy leader of the internationally designated terrorist group Tehrik-i-Taliban Pakistan (TTP). He was the leader of the Mehsud faction of the Taliban in South Waziristan, Pakistan. He was formerly the chief of TTP's South Waziristan chapter. Pakistani intelligence officials were reported as saying that he was among the 13 militants who had been killed along in a U.S. drone strike in Afghanistan's Khost province on 25 November 2015. Azam Tariq, spokesperson for the Sajna faction of TTP denied that Mehsud had been killed. He was eventually killed in a drone strike on 8 February 2018 in North Waziristan, near the border with Afghanistan.

== History ==
He was born in either 1975 or 1977 in Dwa Toi village located between Makeen and Sara Rogha in Ladha subdivision, South Waziristan. He was a member of the Shabi Khel clan of Mehsud tribe. His father was named Malik Muhammad. Before he joined the TTP, he was studying in college and was part of the Tablighi Jamaat. Senator Saleh Shah of the Jamiat Ulema-e Islam (F) said of his life before joining the TTP, "He didn't even kill a bird in Pakistan. He was one of the people who never took funds from any other country to fight against the Pakistani state".
