= Abdul Haq Square =

Square in Kabul, Afghanistan

Abdul Haq Square (Pashto: د عبدالحق څلورلارې) is a square in Kabul, Afghanistan. It was named after Abdul Haq. It is located between Mikrorayon One and Mikrorayon Two, two apartment blocks, and "close to several ministries and the national intelligence agency," including Kabul Tower, which houses the Ministry of Communications and Information Technology.

An explosion took place on the square on 9 October 2025, in the context of the 2025 Pakistani airstrikes in Kabul. After the Taliban takeover this site is covered in Pro Taliban flags and areas and square is a propaganda site now for the Taliban tons of the areas that were here before 2021 have been destroyed or have been changed due to more active political action in the government of Afghanistan.
