= 2023 Chitral cross-border attacks =

Terrorist attacks in Pakistan

2023 Chitral border attack
- Part of the Insurgency in Khyber Pakhtunkhwa
Date	7 September 2023
Location	Chitral district, Khyber Pakhtunkhwa Province, Pakistan
Result	Pakistani Victory: Militants flee to Eastern Afghanistan; Pakistan closes the border for 9 days

Belligerents
Pakistan	Pakistani Taliban; Al-Qaeda in the Indian Subcontinent

Casualties and losses
4 soldiers killed	12 insurgents killed

On September 7, 2023, clashes erupted near the Pakistan-Afghanistan border in Chitral district, Khyber Pakhtunkhwa province. A group of armed fighters affiliated with the Tehreek-e-Taliban Pakistan (TTP) and Al-Qaeda in the Indian Subcontinent (AQIS) attacked five Pakistani military checkpoints from Afghan territory. The Pakistani military responded to the attack, resulting in casualties on both sides. Four Pakistani soldiers were killed, and according to reports, twelve of the attackers were also killed.

== Background ==
=== Geography ===
Chitral's mountainous terrain presents a significant obstacle to cross-border movement throughout the winter due to heavy snowfall. Harsh weather conditions further exacerbate the difficulty of traversing the region during this season. Conversely, summer brings more accessible routes and milder weather, which coincides with an observed increase in potential cross-border activity.

=== Recent attacks ===
Pakistani defense analysts recently reported a worrying increase in militant attacks targeting military installations. This coincides with a broader trend of heightened extremist violence within the country since the Taliban's 2021 takeover of Afghanistan. These developments have strained relations between Pakistan and the Taliban government. The Taliban have denied accusations from Pakistan of harboring militant groups, specifically the Pakistani Taliban (TTP). Notably, the TTP views the Afghan Taliban as an ally.

More than 300 similar attacks of varying intensity took place in Khyber Pakhtunkhwa province in this year.

== Detail ==
=== Attack and Aftermath ===
On September 7, 2023, a clash erupted near two military checkpoints in Chitral district, Khyber Pakhtunkhwa province, Pakistan. An estimated 150-300 armed individuals engaged in a firefight with Pakistani forces. The incident involved advanced weaponry and resulted in casualties on both sides. At least four Pakistani soldiers and twelve armed individuals were killed. The outlawed militant group Tehreek-e-Taliban Pakistan (TTP) claimed responsibility for the attack. A United Nations Security Council report claims that al-Qaeda in the Indian Subcontinent (AQIS) supplied the TTP with multiple fighters to conduct the operation.

Pakistani forces responded to the attack, reportedly inflicting casualties on the armed group. News reports indicate that twelve individuals were killed. Following the incident, Pakistani forces conducted an operation to secure the area. The Pakistani military claimed the attacks originated in the neighboring Afghan provinces of Kunar and Nuristan. They launched a search operation in response. Pakistan has previously expressed its expectation that the Afghan government would uphold its commitments and prevent the use of Afghan territory for cross-border attacks.

The Torkham border crossing, a key route for trade and travel between Pakistan and Afghanistan, remained closed for a second day on September 8, 2023, following the attack in the Chitral district. This closure caused delays for trucks transporting goods. Pakistan's Caretaker Foreign Minister, Jalil Abbas Jilani, referred to the recent attack on military checkpoints in Lower Chitral district, Khyber Pakhtunkhwa, as an "isolated incident."

=== Protests ===
On September 8, 2023, Pakistan's Foreign Office (FO) summoned the Afghan Charge d'Affaires in Islamabad to express strong concern regarding the recent attacks in the Chitral district. The FO delivered a demarche, emphasizing to the Afghan interim government that cross-border attacks and the use of Afghan territory by the TTP threatened regional security.

=== Afghan initiatives ===
An Afghan official, speaking on condition of anonymity, reported that Afghan forces detained approximately 200 individuals believed to be TTP members following the Chitral attack. These individuals are reportedly being held in custody. The official also stated that Afghan authorities were taking steps to move other TTP members away from the Pakistani border. However, there has been no official confirmation of these actions from the Afghan Taliban government.

Pakistan's Interim Foreign Minister, Jalil Abbas Jilani, described the visit of a Pakistani delegation led by Ambassador Asif Durrani to Afghanistan as productive. He also expressed concern about the recent rise in cross-border attacks. The delegation reportedly received information regarding Afghan efforts related to the militant activity.

== See also ==
War in North-West Pakistan

- Afghanistan–Pakistan border skirmishes
- Mianwali air base attack
- 2011 Chitral cross-border attacks
- 2024 Afghanistan–Pakistan skirmishes
