= Capture of Damascus (1260) =

Mongol capture of city of Damascus in 1260

- Part of the Mongol invasion of Syria
| Date | March 1260 |
| Location | Damascus, Syria |
| Result | Ilkhanate victory |
| Territorial changes | Occupation of Damascus |

Belligerents
| Ilkhanate | Ayyubid Sultanate |

Commanders and leaders
| Hulegu Khan; Kitbuqa Noyan | al-Nasir Yusuf |

Units involved
| Mongol cavalry | Mixed Ayyubid army of local troops, Bedouins, Turkmen, Kurds, and volunteers |

Casualties and losses
| Unknown | Unknown |

The Capture of Damascus took place in 1260 during the Mongol invasion of Syria led by Hulegu Khan, a prince of the Mongol Empire and founder of the Ilkhanate. After the destruction of Aleppo, the city of Damascus chose to surrender and opened its gates to the Mongol army. As the city submitted without resistance, it was spared from the devastation inflicted on other cities that resisted the Mongol advance.

== Background ==
Al-Nasir Yusuf had maintained diplomatic contacts with the Mongols for many years. In the 1240's he sent envoys to Mongol officials and agreed to pay tribute. In 1250 he dispatched another embassy to the court of Möngke Khan, confirming his position as a Mongol vassal and receiving recognition of his authority in Syria. Despite these earlier submissions, the political situation shifted after the Mongol destruction of Baghdad. As the Mongol army advanced westward under Hulegu Khan, al-Nasir Yusuf began preparing for resistance while also seeking help from the rulers of Egypt.

At the time of the Mongol invasion of Syria, the region was ruled by the Ayyubid prince An-Nasir Yusuf, a descendant of Saladin who controlled Aleppo and Damascus. In the late 1250s, Mongol forces under Hulagu advanced into the Middle East following the conquest of Baghdad in 1258. The campaign brought large parts of Mesopotamia and Syria under Mongol control. During the campaign, While Aleppo refused to surrender and was taken by storm by the Mongol army. The city was subsequently pillaged for several days, and many inhabitants were killed or enslaved. The fall of the city created widespread alarm in Syria and led many refugees to flee to Damascus.

== Capture ==
Following the fall of Aleppo, the Mongol army advanced toward Damascus. An-Nasir Yusuf withdrew south toward Gaza, seeking assistance from Egypt as the Mongol forces approached. Damascus chose to surrender to Hulegu. The city opened its gates to the Mongol army and was therefore not subjected to the destruction experienced by other resisting cities. This peaceful submission was led by the city's prominent notables and encouraged by the official al-Zayn al-Hafizi, who advocated for cooperation with the Mongols as a means of preservation.

The leading citizens of Damascus sent a delegation to Hulagu carrying gifts and the keys of the city. Hulagu accepted their submission and issued a decree guaranteeing the safety of the inhabitants. Mongol commanders were then sent to take control of the city, while its governor remained in office under Mongol supervision. Although the city surrendered, the citadel initially resisted but was captured shortly afterward by Mongol forces under Kitbuqa, whose troops executed its commanders. Following the occupation, a Muslim prince was appointed as governor of Damascus under Mongol authority. This arrangement reflected the Mongol practice of allowing local rulers who submitted to retain their positions under Mongol rule.

== Aftermath ==
After the capture of Damascus, a Mongol garrison remained in the city under Kitbuqa. Contemporary accounts indicate that the Mongol commander showed favor toward local Christian communities during the occupation, which increased tensions with the Muslim population. The Mongols relied partly on local rulers to administer the conquered territories. The former Ayyubid prince Al-Ashraf Musa, who had previously been deposed by al-Nasir Yusuf, joined the Mongols and was restored to his former principality of Homs while also receiving a nominal title over Syria. Shortly after the occupation, Mongol forces conducted raids southward through Palestine and Transjordan, attacking settlements including Hebron, Jerusalem, and Nablus. While Mongol forces occupied Damascus, Hulagu received news of the death of the Great Khan Möngke Khan. Hulagu subsequently withdrew eastward with much of his army, leaving Kitbuqa in command of the remaining Mongol forces in Syria. However, tensions increased in Damascus when some local Christians celebrated the Mongol victory over Muslim authorities. When news arrived later in 1260 of the Mongol defeat at the Battle of Ain Jalut, violence broke out in the city, and Christian property was attacked and looted in retaliation.

== Bibliography ==
- Turnbull, Stephen (2003). Genghis Khan and the Mongol Conquests 1190–1400. Osprey Publishing.
- Prawdin, Michael (1961). The Mongol Empire: Its Rise and Legacy. George Allen & Unwin.
- Howorth, Henry H. (1880). History of the Mongols, from the 9th to the 19th Century. Vol. II.
- Amitai, Reuven (1995). Mongols and Mamluks: The Mamluk-Īlkhānid War, 1260–1281. Cambridge University Press.
