= Umar Media =

Jihadist media production center for the Pakistani Taliban

- عمر میڈیا
- Formation: Early 2000s
- Purpose: Dissemination of Jihadist propaganda
- Official language: Pashto
- Owner: Pakistani Taliban

Umar Media (Pashto: عمر میڈیا, romanized: ʻUmar Miḍīyā) is the core media production center for the Pakistani Taliban. It is produced mainly in Pashto with translations in English and Urdu.

== History ==
Umar Media, named after Taliban founder Mullah Muhammad Umar, serves as the Pakistani Taliban's de facto Ministry of Information and Broadcasting, producing propaganda in Pashto, later translated into Urdu, English, Dari/Persian, and Arabic. Its content includes video series, a daily radio broadcast, a bi-weekly current affairs podcast, and official statements on attacks and political issues. Through these media, Umar Media disseminates ideological messaging, strategic narratives, and updates on the group's activities to both local and international audiences. Umar uses a yellow-orange Pashto calligraphy for its logo. Umar Media was first established in the early 2000s and published videos under the Muqatal Network of the Pakistani Taliban, with their first video release being on 6 March 2011 called "Real Situation of Tribal Areas in Pakistan".

In October 2012, Umar Media created a Facebook account under the name Umar Media TTP, using the platform to promote its activities and recruit individuals for various media-related roles. The account posted about "online job opportunities" seeking individuals skilled in video editing, translations, content sharing, uploading, downloading, and data collection, indicating an effort to expand the Pakistani Taliban's digital operations. This recruitment drive was reported by the SITE Intelligence Group, which monitors extremist activities online. Shortly after, in December 2012, Facebook took action by banning the account, citing its use for promoting terrorist content and violating the platform’s policies on extremist activity.

Umar Media launched a website under the domain "umarmedia.com" on 6 April 2014, which served as a central platform for distributing the Pakistani Taliban’s propaganda, recruitment materials, and ideological messaging. The site featured a variety of content, including official statements, video releases, militant training guides, and updates on the group's activities, often aimed at both local and international audiences. It also provided links to downloadable publications and multimedia productions designed to radicalize and recruit sympathizers. However, due to its role in promoting terrorism and extremist violence, the Pakistan Telecommunication Authority (PTA) eventually intervened, shutting down the website on 8 April 2014 as part of broader efforts to curb online terrorist content and disrupt the group’s digital operations.

In 2016, Umar Media launched its first official magazine, titled Tehrik-i-Taliban Pakistan, as a digital publication available online in PDF format. This magazine served as a key propaganda tool for the Pakistani Taliban, featuring ideological articles, strategic messages, interviews with militant leaders, and updates on the group's activities.

Following the Taliban's takeover of Afghanistan and the Fall of Kabul in 2021, Umar Media significantly expanded its operations, increasing the volume of its publications and enhancing the professionalism of its content. The media wing underwent a substantial revamp, improving its online presence, refining its video editing techniques, and adopting more sophisticated production methods to strengthen its propaganda efforts. This period saw a surge in high-quality video releases, more polished publications, and a greater emphasis on digital outreach, allowing the Pakistani Taliban to project a more organized and influential image while amplifying its ideological messaging to a broader audience.

Umar Media is regarded as the primary platform for all official publications of the Pakistani Taliban, serving as the central hub for the group's propaganda, ideological dissemination, and strategic messaging.
