= List of terrorist incidents in Pakistan since 2001 =

This is the list of terrorist incidents in Pakistan. The war on terror had a major impact on Pakistan, with terrorism and sectarian violence, but after the September 11 attacks in the United States in 2001, it also had to combat the threat of al-Qaeda and Taliban militants, who fled from Afghanistan and usually targeted high-profile political figures. Terrorism in Pakistan peaked in the late 2000s and early 2010s.

== Summary ==
In 2006, 657 terrorist attacks, including 41 of a sectarian nature, took place, leaving 907 people dead and 1,543 others injured according to Pak Institute for Peace Studies (PIPS) security report.

In 2007, 1,515 terrorist attacks and clashes, including all the suicide attacks, target killings and assassinations, resulted in 3,448 casualties and 5,353 injuries, according to the PIPS security report. These casualties figure 128 percent and 491.7 percent higher as compared with 2006 and 2005, respectively. The report states that Pakistan faced 60 suicide attacks (mostly targeted at security forces) during 2007, which killed at least 770, besides injuring another 1,574 people. PIPS report shows visible increase in suicide attacks after Lal Masjid operation.

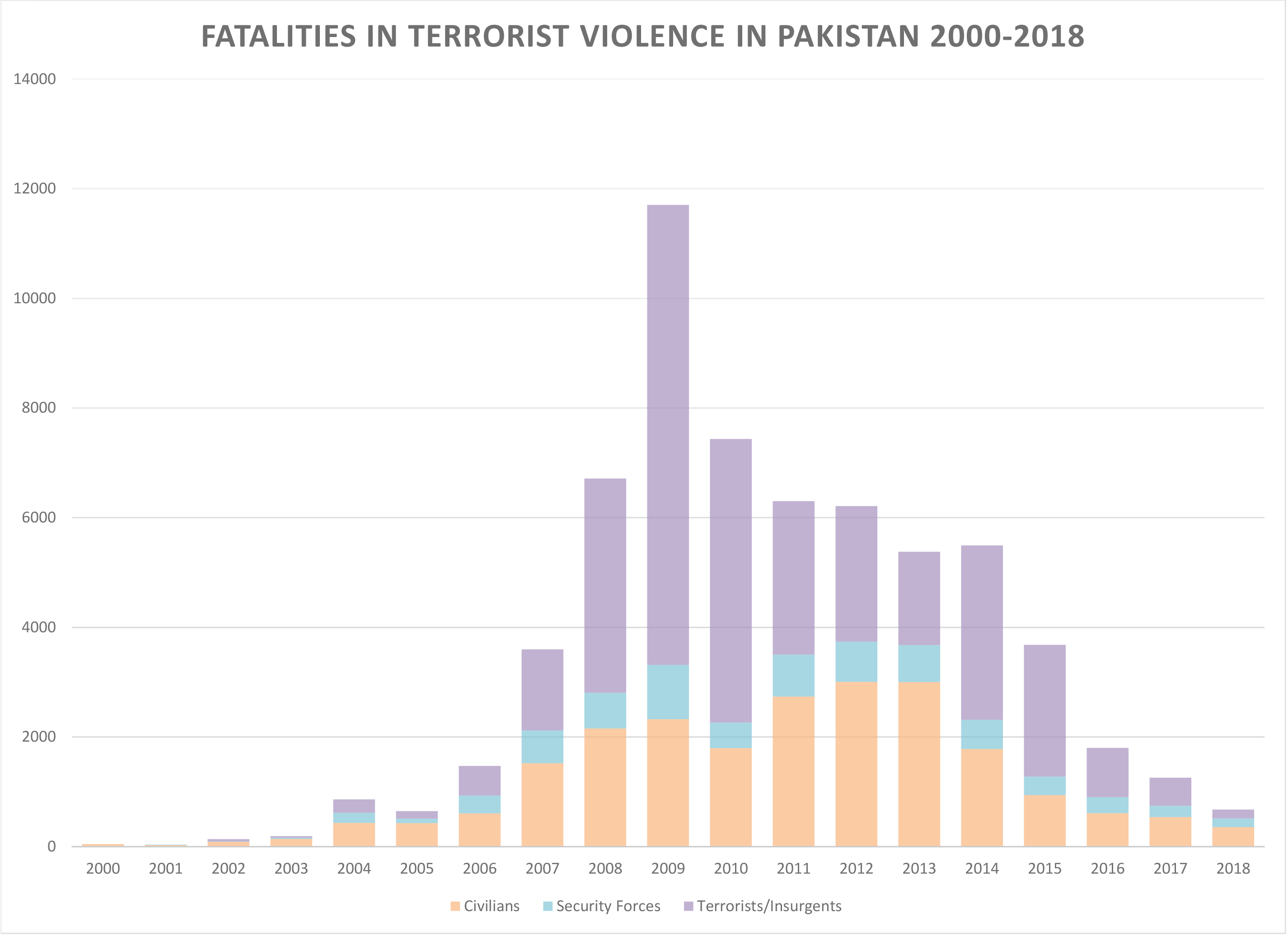
Fatalities in terrorist violence in Pakistan, (2000–2018)

In 2008, the country saw 2,148 terrorist attacks, which caused 2,267 fatalities and 4,558 injuries. Human Rights Commission of Pakistan (HRCP) in its annual report indicated that there were at least 67 suicide attacks across Pakistan killing 973 people and injuring 2,318. Further, a source in the investigation agencies disclosed that the total number of suicide blasts in Pakistan since 2002 rose to 140 (till 21 December 2008) while 56 bombers had struck in 2007.

In 2009, the worst of any year, 2,586 terrorist, insurgent and sectarian-related incidents were reported, killing 3,021 people and injured 7,334, according to the "Pakistan Security Report 2009" published by PIPS. These casualties figure 48 percent higher as compared to 2008. On the other hand, the rate of suicide attacks surged by one third to 87 bombings that killed 1,300 people and injured 3,600.

Terrorist attacks staged in Pakistan have killed over 35,000 people, 5,000 of which are law enforcement personnel, and caused material damage to the Pakistani economy totalling US$67 billion by the IMF and the World Bank.

According to an independent research site pakistanbodycount.org maintained by Zeeshan-ul-hassan Usmani a Fulbright scholar deaths from suicide bombings up to October 2011 were 5,067 with over 13,000 injured. The website also provides analysis on the data showing an evident increase in suicide bombing after the Lal Masjid operation. All death counts are verifiable from news sources placed online.

== Overview ==
Terrorist incidents in Pakistan
Year	Number of incidents	Deaths	Injuries
2016	23	1,086	1,337
2015	22	1,606	1,847
2014	17	2,412	3,395
2013	13	2,874	5,768
2012	32	2,783	4,264
2011	64	1,655	2,638
2010	144	1,695	2,961
2009	101	1,487	3,541
2008	67	1,184	1,876
2007	51	1,406	2,343
2006	16	314	669
2005	11	150	296
2004	19	304	671
2003	8	119	181
2002	14	105	331
2001	5	109	265
2000	4	118	448
1999	39	127	246
1998	37	151	349
1997	206	443	525
1996	180	423	755
1995	666	712	615
1994	154	354	434
1993	8	27	109
1992	85	152	393
1991	150	231	599
1990	87	188	486
1989	45	56	248
1988	44	136	266
1987	60	183	1,095
1986	24	60	351
1985	2	0	1
1984	3	12	49
1983	9	10	26
1982	4	3	9
1981	4	4	4
1980	1	17	18
1979	7	6	42
1978	2	5	2
1977	0	0	0
1976	3	1	3
1975	2	1	0
1974	2	0	2
1973	0	0	0
1972	0	0	0
1971	0	0	0
1970	1	1	0

== Lists by year ==
- Terrorist incidents in Pakistan in 1987
- Terrorist incidents in Pakistan in 1990
- Terrorist incidents in Pakistan in 1991
- Terrorist incidents in Pakistan in 1992
- Terrorist incidents in Pakistan in 1993
- Terrorist incidents in Pakistan in 1994
- Terrorist incidents in Pakistan in 1995
- Terrorist incidents in Pakistan in 1996
- Terrorist incidents in Pakistan in 1997
- Terrorist incidents in Pakistan in 1998
- Terrorist incidents in Pakistan in 1999
- Terrorist incidents in Pakistan in 2000
- Terrorist incidents in Pakistan in 2001
- Terrorist incidents in Pakistan in 2002
- Terrorist incidents in Pakistan in 2003
- Terrorist incidents in Pakistan in 2004
- Terrorist incidents in Pakistan in 2005
- Terrorist incidents in Pakistan in 2006
- Terrorist incidents in Pakistan in 2007
- Terrorist incidents in Pakistan in 2008
- Terrorist incidents in Pakistan in 2009
- Terrorist incidents in Pakistan in 2010
- Terrorist incidents in Pakistan in 2011
- Terrorist incidents in Pakistan in 2012
- Terrorist incidents in Pakistan in 2013
- Terrorist incidents in Pakistan in 2014
- Terrorist incidents in Pakistan in 2015
- Terrorist incidents in Pakistan in 2016
- Terrorist incidents in Pakistan in 2017
- Terrorist incidents in Pakistan in 2018
- Terrorist incidents in Pakistan in 2019
- Terrorist incidents in Pakistan in 2020
- Terrorist incidents in Pakistan in 2021
- Terrorist incidents in Pakistan in 2022
- Terrorist incidents in Pakistan in 2023
- Terrorist incidents in Pakistan in 2024
- Terrorist incidents in Pakistan in 2025
- Terrorist incidents in Pakistan in 2026

== See also ==
- War in North-West Pakistan
- Terrorism in Pakistan
- List of violent incidents in Pakistan (2006–2009), table and map providing overview of all violence in Pakistan between 2006 and 2009.
- Drone attacks in Pakistan
- List of Militants fatality reports in Pakistan
- Sectarian violence in Pakistan
- Pakistan in the war on terror
- List of terrorist organisations banned in Pakistan
