= Terrorist incidents in Pakistan in 2009 =

In 2009, Pakistan suffered 50 terrorist, insurgent and sectarian-related incidents that killed 180 people and injured 300.

== January ==
- 4 January:- At least seven people, three of them policemen and two journalists, were killed when a suicide bomber blew himself up in front of the Government Polytechnic College near an imambargah on Multan Road in Dera Ismail Khan. About 25 people were injured, most of them policemen.
- 10 January:- A fierce gunbattle between rival sects in Hangu continued on Saturday amid efforts to broker an early truce to stop bloodshed. Official sources said that 26 people, including the deputy chairman of the local chapter of the Ahli Sunnat Wal Jamaat, Mufti Rustam, had been killed and several others injured in the two-day fighting.
- 26 January:- At least five people have been killed and many more wounded in a bomb blast in north-west Pakistan, police say. The bomb, attached to a bicycle, went off on a busy main road in the town of Dera Ismail Khan. While in another incident, Hussain Ali Yousafi, chairman of the Hazara Democratic Party, was shot dead by Lashkar-e-Jhangvi in the southwestern city of Quetta.

== February ==
- 3 February:- One man was killed and 18 others injured in a hand grenade attack on a Sunni mosque at Mohallah Joginwala in Dera Ismail Khan district on Tuesday evening.
- 5 February:- Up to 32 people were killed when a suspected suicide bombing ripped through a crowd of Shia worshippers outside a Dera Ghazi Khan mosque on Thursday. Police said the blast targeted dozens of people converging on the Al Hussainia Mosque after dark, shortly before a religious gathering.
- 7 February:- At least seven officers were killed in an attack on a checkpoint in Mianwali in Punjab near restive Khyber-Pakhtunkhwa.
- 11 February:- Awami National Party (ANP) provincial lawmaker Alam Zeb Khan was killed and eight people injured in a remote-controlled blast on Wednesday. The bomb had been fitted to a motorbike parked near the residence of the slain MPA on Dalazak Road in Peshawar. This was the sixth such attack on ANP in less than a year.
- 17 February:- At least three people were killed by a car bomb which exploded outside the home of a government official in north-western Pakistan. The bomb targeted a local anti-Taliban mayor in the suburb of Bazidkhel near the city of Peshawar. He survived but several people were hurt.
- 20 February:- A curfew was imposed in Dera Ismail Khan and the army called in to quell riots immediately after a suicide bomber killed at least 30 Shia's and injured another 157 who were attending a funeral in southern Dera Ismail Khan district. Witnesses said police ‘ran off’ when gunfire broke out after the blast at the funeral of Shia leader Sher Zaman – who was gunned down a day earlier.

== March ==
- 2 March:- A suicide bomber killed five and injured 12 at a girls’ religious school in Pishin District of Balochistan on Monday.
- 3 March:- A convoy carrying Sri Lankan cricketers and officials in two buses was fired upon by 12 gunmen, near the Gaddafi Stadium in Lahore. The cricketers were on their way to play the third day of the second Test against the Pakistani cricket team. Six members of the Sri Lankan cricket team were injured. Six Pakistani policemen and two civilians were killed.
- 5 March:- One person was killed and 19 others sustained injuries when a hand-grenade hurled by unidentified people at the worshippers exploded in Ameer Hamza mosque in Dera Ismail Khan. While in Peshawar, unidentified people blew up the mausoleum of the most-revered mystic poet of the Pakhtun land Rahman Baba in the early hours of Thursday by planting four bombs inside the structure of the shrine.
- 7 March:- A bomb-laden car exploded in Peshawar as police tried to pull a body from it killing eight people and injuring five. Seven of the dead were policemen while the other was a passerby. In a separate incident, a roadside bomb killed three civilians and wounded four troops in the town of Darra Adam Khel.
- 11 March:- Khyber-Pakhtunkhwa Senior Minister and Awami National Party leader Bashir Bilour survived an assassination attempt that left six people, including two suspected suicide attackers, dead in Namak Mandi in Peshawar on Wednesday. Four persons, including a young girl, who was married the previous Sunday, were critically wounded in the firing, grenade attack and suicide blast. This was the second assassination attempt on Bilour in less than six months and seventh suicide attack on ANP in little over a year.
- 16 March:- At least 14 people were killed and 17 injured on Monday when a suicide bomber blew himself up near the busiest bus stand of Rawalpindi at Pirwadhai.
- 18 March:- Five people including three policemen were killed and four injured when over 100 unidentified armed men attacked a police vehicle at the entrance of the University of Malakand at Chakdara in Lower Dir District on Tuesday night.
- 23 March:- A security official was killed and three others injured in a suicide bombing outside a police Special Branch office in Islamabad.
- 26 March:- At least 10 people were killed and 25 others injured in suicide attack at a restaurant targeting opponents of Tehreek-e-Taliban Pakistan chief Baitullah Mehsud near Jandola, South Waziristan on Thursday.
- 27 March:- 76 persons were killed and over 100 injured in an apparent suicide attack on a mosque at Peshawar-Torkham Highway in Jamrud, Khyber Agency during the Friday congregation. Intelligence sources, however, put the number of dead at 86 but officials of the political administration were conservative by putting the death toll at 50.
- 30 March:- At least eight police recruits and a civilian were killed when about 10 terrorists attacked the Manawan Police Training School in Lahore near the border with India with guns and grenades. Security forces regained control of the facility in an operation that lasted for more than eight hours. About 93 cadets and civilians were injured.

== April ==
- 4 April:- A suicide bomber struck a camp of the Frontier Constabulary (FC) at Margalla Road in Islamabad on Saturday, killing at least eight FC personnel and a civilian, besides the attacker himself, and injuring 12 others.
- 5 April:- A suicide bomber blew himself up at a Shia religious gathering in an Imambargah in Chakwal on Sunday, killing at least 22 people and wounding 60. The attacker struck at the gates of a Shia mosque where some 1,200 people were attending a religious gathering.
- 6 April:- Police found bullet-riddled bodies of four local aid workers, including three women, in Shinkiari area of Mansehra District.
- 15 April:- A suicide car bomber attacked a security post in north-western Pakistan, killing at least 18 people, nine of them police and injuring five others. The bomber set off his explosives as he pulled up at a checkpoint in Charsadda, a town near the city of Peshawar.
- 18 April:- A suicide attacker detonated a car bomb at a checkpoint in the northwestern Pakistani town of Hangu’s Doaba area Saturday, killing at least 22 people, including five security personnel, and injuring another 15.
- 26 April:- 12 children were killed in north-western Pakistan after playing with a bomb they mistook for a toy. The children died after the bomb, which resembled a football, exploded on Saturday in Lower Dir District.
- 29 April:- Targeted killings in Karachi claimed the lives of 34 people and wounded 40 in a matter of hours by unidentified gunmen in different parts of the city. In the month-long incidents of violence until 28 April the police record showed that 16 people had been shot dead and 54 wounded in different incidents of killings. The statistics further showed that of the total number of people, 43 people belonged to the Pakhtun community while seven were Urdu-speaking people.

== May ==
- 5 May:- Seven people, two children and a Frontier Corps soldier among them, were killed and 48 others injured when an explosives-laden car rammed into a pick-up near a checkpost on the Peshawar-Bara road 12 km west of Peshawar Cantonment.
- 11 May:- 10 people died as a suicide bomber blew up his explosives-laden vehicle near an FC checkpost in the outskirts of Darra Adam Khel on Monday, killing eight civilians and two security personnel and injuring 27 other people.
- 14 May:- 9 police officers were injured when three grenades exploded in the city.
- 16 May:- Two successive bomb blasts rocked Peshawar on Saturday, leaving 13 people dead and 34 others injured. A powerful car-bomb killed 12 people and wounded 31 others, including schoolchildren and women, in the Barisco area, while a low intensity device ripped through a garments store in the packed Gora Bazaar in Peshawar Saddar, killing a minor girl and injuring three others.
- 21 May:- At least nine people – four civilians and five security personnel – were killed and 25 injured in a suicide attack near a Frontier Corps (FC) fort in Jandola area of Tank on Thursday evening.
- 22 May:- At least 10 people were killed and 75 injured when a powerful car bomb went off outside a cinema in Peshawar’s Cinema Road area on Friday evening.
- 27 May:- Suicide bombers detonated a vehicle loaded with 100 kilograms of explosives near offices of the capital city police officer (CCPO) and the Inter-Services Intelligence (ISI) in Lahore on Wednesday – killing at least 27 people and wounding 326, in addition to destroying a two-story building of the Rescue 15 police service. This was the second attack on ISI since the start of war on terrorism.
- 28 May:- A succession of blasts rocked Khyber-Pakhtunkhwa, killing 13 people, including five policemen, and injuring over 90 others. Three blasts, one of them a suicide attack targeting a police post, took place in Peshawar and one suicide bombing at a security checkpost in Dera Ismail Khan.

== June ==
- 5 June:- At least 40 people were killed and another 70 injured during Friday prayers when a suicide bomber blew himself up outside a mosque in Hayagai Sharqai village in Upper Dir District.
- 6 June:- Two policemen were killed after a young man carried out a suicide attack against Rescue 15, a police helpline unit, in Islamabad on Saturday. At least four other policemen were injured.
- 8 June:- A wave of violence emanating from rivalries between political factions in Karachi continued to spread as 12 more people fell victim to target killings on Monday. Thus, the number of political activists to have fallen victim to target killings during the first week of June reached 35. Most of the victims had fallen prey to the bloody rivalry of MQM (Altaf) and MQM (Haqiqi) factions; the latest incidence seeming to be sparked from the efforts of reunification of Amir and Afaq groups, that constitute the MQM (Haqiqi) group, at the behest of Imran Khan.
- 9 June:- A massive truck bomb ripped through the five-star Pearl Continental hotel in Peshawar on Tuesday killing 11 people and more than wounding 60. The attackers entered the compound on two vehicles at about 10:30pm, spraying the security guards at the hotel gate with bullets from one and blowing up the other in the hotel parking. The death toll later rose to 17.
- 11 June:- In a day of multiple terrorist attacks throughout Pakistan, a Khyber-Pakhtunkhwa Minister for Prisons, Mian Nisar Gul Kakakhel, was seriously injured and his two guards were killed when his convoy was ambushed by suspected militants in Darra Adam Khel. In Balochistan, one person was killed and 35 injured when a bomb hidden in a toilet exploded in a Quetta-bound train. The Baloch Republican Army (BRA) claimed responsibility for the attack. While in the country's northwest, two people were killed and 13 including eight policemen injured in a grenade and suicide attack on police in Latifabad, Peshawar.
- 12 June:- A leading Sunni Barelwi cleric, Sarfraz Ahmed Naeemi with anti-Taliban views, was assassinated, with six other people killed and five injured when a suicide attacker detonated himself at the Jamia Naeemia madrassa on the Allama Iqbal Road in Garhi Shahu area of Lahore shortly after Friday prayers. While in Nowshera, five worshippers were killed and 105 others sustained injuries when a suicide bomber rammed his explosives-laden van into a mosque during the Friday prayers in the Cantonment area at the Grand Trunk Road. The Nowshera attack was the sixteenth such attack on Army outside the conflict zone and second one in Nowshera. Later the Tehrik-i-Taliban Pakistan (TTP) on Friday claimed responsibility for three suicide attacks in Peshawar, Nowshera and Lahore, saying similar attacks would soon follow.
- 14 June:- Nine people were killed and over 40 injured when a powerful explosion ripped through a busy market in Dera Ismail Khan on Sunday.
- 26 June:- A Taliban suicide bomber killed two soldiers on Friday when he blew himself up near an army vehicle in Muzaffarabad, Azad Jammu and Kashmir (AJK), in the first such attack in AJK.

== July ==
- 1 July:- Gunmen killed a tribal elder, his driver and a guard, in an ambush at Khyber Pass. Also, a bomb exploded near a police vehicle in the northwestern town of Dera Ismail Khan, killing one civilian and wounding three
- 2 July:- 36 persons were injured, some critically, when a lone suicide bomber rammed his motorcycle into a bus carrying employees of the Army-run Heavy Mechanical Complex (HMC) at the Peshawar Road near Chur Chowk in Rawalpindi on Thursday at around 4.15 pm. The suicide bomber was the only reported fatality. While in Balochistan, four people were killed in a suicide attack in Sohrab outside Quetta.
- 10 July:- Militants attacked a security checkpoint in the tribal Bajaur Agency, killing four policemen.
- 13 July:- At least 12 people, 8 children among them, were killed and over 50 injured when a large quantity of explosives stored in a house which also had a seminary exploded in a village near Mian Channu, about 45 km from Khanewal, on Monday morning. The blast happened in a school house used to teach Qur'an to children. The blast took place soon after a class was completed at about 9 am, while the students were leaving the house. Forty other houses were destroyed, and 60 people were injured. The house was owned by Riaz Ahmad Kamboh, a religious teacher. The blast left a crater 40 feet wide and 8 feet deep. After the blast, a steel box containing audio tapes of sermons by clerics belonging to Lashkar-e-Jhangvi was recovered from the house. It appeared that the house was also being used as an ammunition dump. According to local police, small rockets and missiles propelled by shoulder-fired launchers were among the other material recovered from the site.
- 15 July:- A roadside bomb in Bannu killed two policemen.
- 16 July:- An official of the United Nations High Commission for Refugees (UNHCR) and a guard were shot dead and another official and Afghan Commissionarte were injured in Peshawar.
- 19 July:- Militants attacked a police patrol near the Khyber tribal region, killing four
- 28 July:- A suicide attack at a checkpoint killed two policemen in North Waziristan. militants killed an abducted police official in Sangota four policemen were killed by the Baluch rebels
- 29 July:- A remote controlled car bomb killed two men guarding a Shia lawyer in Dera Ismail Khan. In Shangla, more than 50 Taliban militants raided the residence of militia leader Khalilur Rehman and shot him dead.

== August ==
- 4 August:- Separatist rebels on Tuesday shot dead four policemen and threatened to execute 21 hostages (11 of them laborers) unless Pakistan withdraws paramilitary troops and releases detainees in Balochistan.
- 9 August:- Baloch militants killed four policemen and threatened to kill more than 12 hostages if their demand that their comrades in police custody be released is not met.
- 13 August:- Baloch militants fired rockets at a police vehicle outside Quetta, killing two policemen and wounding three.
- 15 August:- Five people including three soldiers and two civilians were killed and four others injured when a suicide bomber rammed his explosives-laden car into a security check-post in Khwazakhela area of Swat District on Saturday.
- 17 August:- Seven people were killed and eight others injured when a bomb placed in a vehicle exploded at a filling station in the Shabqadar area in Charsadda on Monday.
- 20 August:- Eight people, including four policemen, were injured when a bomb exploded close to a police patrol car on the Misryal road in Rawalpindi on Thursday.
- 23 August:- Three passers-by were killed and 15 injured Sunday in a suicide bombing in Peshawar triggered by an apparent feud between rival militant groups, Ansar-ul-Islam and Lashkar-e-Islam.
- 27 August:- 22 Khasadars were killed when a suicide bomber struck a security post near Torkham, Khyber Agency along the Afghan border on Thursday evening. According to witnesses, the bomber blew himself up when the tribal policemen gathered at the checkpost and were about to break their fast.
- 30 August:- A suicide bomber managed to sneak into the main police station in Mingora, Swat District on Sunday, causing a huge explosion that killed 16 members of the recently recruited Special Police Force and injured another five.

== September ==
- 2 September:- Religious Affairs Minister Hamid Saeed Kazmi was injured in a brazen attack in Islamabad on Wednesday. His driver was killed and a police guard injured (who later succumbed to his injuries). The assailants attacked the minister’s car when he was leaving his ministry at G-6/3, some yards away from the Aabpara police station, along with his driver Mohammad Younus and guard Mohammad Ashraf.
- 6 September:- Three policemen were shot dead in Hasan Abdal in apparent act of targeted killing, a senior police officer said on Sunday.
- 8 September:- Taliban militants on Tuesday shot dead four schoolchildren and wounded six others in an apparent sectarian attack in the remote Atmankhel town of Orakzai Agency.
- 13 September:- Three Frontier Corps (FC) personnel were killed and as many injured as their routine patrol hit a landmine in the Bara Tehsil of Khyber Agency on Sunday.
- 18 September:- At least 33 people were killed and 80 others injured when a bomber blew up an explosive-laden vehicle in a market on the Kohat-Hangu road on Friday. The blast was powerful enough to cause damage to all shops within a radius of 100 yards. The death toll later reached 40.
  - 2009 Usterzai bombing, a suicide car bombing killed at least 39 people in Usterzai Pakistan.
- 26 September:- Two suicide attackers on Saturday separately rammed their explosives-laden vehicles into a police station in Bannu and a military-owned commercial bank in Peshawar cantonment, killing at least 23 people and injuring around another 200. At least 10 people were killed in the attack in Peshawar, while seven, including two policemen, were killed in the assault on the Bannu police station. Around 94 people were injured in Peshawar and 64, including 31 policemen, Bannu. The next day the death from two suicide bomb attacks rose to 27.

== October ==
- 5 October:- A suicide bomber dressed in military uniform attacked the highly fortified United Nations World Food Programme offices in Islamabad, killing five people including one Iraqi citizen and injuring six others. The Tehrik-i-Taliban Pakistan claimed responsibility for the attack through spokesperson Azam Tariq.
- 9 October:- A suicide attack at Khyber Bazaar in Peshawar on Friday killed 55 people and injured more than 148. An official at the Lady Reading Hospital said four people had succumbed to their injuries at hospital. The blast occurred at 12:15pm after a white car rammed into a public transport bus, Cantt Superintendent of Police Nisar Marwat told reporters. He said the car was packed with 100 kg of explosives.
- :- 10–11 October:- A total of 22 people including six soldiers, five SSG commandos, three hostages and eight gunmen were killed in an attack on Pakistan Army General Headquarters (GHQ) in Rawalpindi. This attack followed a series of bombings in the North-Western Pakistan, amid speculation that the army is to prepare another major operation in Waziristan against the Taliban. At least nine militants in military uniforms had stormed the GHQ, killed a total of six soldiers including a brigadier and a lieutenant-colonel, and took a total 56 people hostage. They were demanding the release of some of their fellow fighters in exchange for the hostages. Nine of the hostages later escaped. Later a successful operation was conducted early next day by the SSG to free all the hostages, in the process of which four terrorists were killed, with the ring leader Mohammed Aqeel arrested, and five commandos and three hostages also losing their lives. A total of 44 hostages were rescued, which included officers, soldiers and civilian employees. The attack on the GHQ was the seventeenth attack on the army outside conflict zone and the seventh in Rawalpindi since the military operations began in Waziristan in 2004.
- 12 October:- At least 41 people including six soldiers were killed on Monday in a suicide attack on a military convoy in Alpuri area of Shangla District, an area thought to be under the control of Pakistan Army.
- 15 October:- At least 19 people, including 14 security officials, were killed and 41 others sustained injuries in three separate terror attacks in Lahore. All nine attackers were also shot dead by security personnel. The attacks were carried out at the Federal Investigation Agency (FIA) building on the Temple Road, the Manawan Police Training School and the Elite Police Academy on the Bedian. Meanwhile, in the north-western town of Kohat, at least 11 people, three policemen among them, were killed and 22 others injured when a suicide bomber rammed his explosive-packed pick-up into a police station in the Cantonment area for which the Tehrik-i-Taliban Pakistan (TTP) claimed responsibility.
- :- 16 October:- 15 people, including three policemen and a minor, were killed and 21 others wounded in a suicide attack on the offices of the Special Investigation Unit (SIU) of the police, located a few meters away from the recently established Swati Phatak military post, in the Peshawar Cantonment area.
- 20 October:- Two suicide blasts on Tuesday rocked the new campus of the International Islamic University, Islamabad (IIUI) in H-10 sector of Islamabad, killing at least six students and staffers, including three women, and injuring more than 29 others, 25 of them females, with some of them in critical condition. The first blast targeted the cafeteria adjacent to a girls’ hostel around 2:10pm, while the second one targeted the Sharia and Law Department building in the male section of the university. This was the first-ever attack on students in the country since the start of terrorism in 2001.
- 22 October:- A serving Army brigadier, Moinuddin Ahmad, and his driver were gunned down in Islamabad early on Thursday morning while his gunman was critically wounded. Two motorcyclists intercepted his official jeep in Sector G-11/1 and sprayed it with automatic fire. The brigadier's assassination and the subsequent attempts on two brigadiers are the eighteenth such attacks on the army outside the conflict zone.
- 23 October:- Eight persons, including two PAF security personnel, were killed and 17 others sustained injuries when a suicide bomber exploded himself at a police check-post on the GT Road near the Pakistan Aeronautical Complex (PAC), Kamra. This was the fourth major attack on Pakistan Air Force and the second one in Kamra. On the same day, an anti-tank mine planted on the side of a road killed 18 people of a wedding party and injured six others in the Baizai tehsil of Mohmand Agency. And 15 people were injured in bombing outside a restaurant in the Hayatabad area of Peshawar.
- 24 October:- A suicide bomber exploded his car near the Islamabad-Lahore Motorway Interchange (ILMI), killing a Sub-Inspector of motorway police.
- 25 October:- Punjabi-born Balochistan Education Minister Shafiq Ahmed Khan, a member of the Pakistan People’s Party (PPP), was shot dead outside his residence in Quetta. The Baloch Liberation United Front (BLUF) claimed responsibility.
- 27 October:- Targeting another military officer, Brigadier Waqar Ahmad, two gunmen riding a motorbike attacked him, who was travelling with his mother and driver, as he came out of his house in Sector I-9/1 of Islamabad, riddling his car with bullets. Taliban militants shot dead the head of a pro-government tribal leader in Khar, the main town in Bajaur.
- 28 October:- At least 118 people have been killed and over 200 injured by a car bomb in a market in Peshawar. The market mostly sold products for women and a large percentage of the dead, were confirmed to be women, reports say. The number of casualties are expected to rise in the local area.
- 31 October:- A roadside bomb killed seven Pakistani soldiers in the Khyber Agency, close to the Afghan border. The vehicle hit the bomb whilst carrying paramilitary troops on a routine patrol in Sur Khar.

== November ==
- 2 November:- At least 35 people were killed and 65 others injured when a suicide bomber blew himself up outside a branch of the National Bank of Pakistan in Rawalpindi on Monday. Most of those who died in the attack were serving or retired civil and military employees, pensioners and elderly citizens who had queued for drawing salary and paying utility bills. The powerful explosion took place at 10.45am at the branch’s parking zone located outside a four-star Shalimar Hotel off The Mall road and near the State Bank of Pakistan.
- 6 November:- In a third incident of its kind in Islamabad, gunmen injured an army brigadier and his driver in Islamabad on Friday, as they opened fire on their vehicle. Brigadier Sohail and his driver came under attack by unknown assailants in the I-8/4 sector of the capital.
- 8 November:- 15 people, including the Nazim of the Adezai Union Council, were killed and 42 others sustained injuries in a suicide attack near the Matani cattle market, some 25 km from Peshawar, on Sunday. Nazim Abdul Malik had survived over 20 attacks on his vehicle, house and Hujra since he had parted ways with the militants in October last year.
- 9 November:- A bomb went off near a police post in the city of Peshawar, killing at least 3 and injuring around five. This bombing was believed to be a suicide attack. No group claimed responsibility for the attack.
- 10 November:- At least 34 people were killed and nearly 100 others injured when a powerful car bomb ripped through a crowded intersection in Charsadda bazaar on Tuesday afternoon. Scores of women and children died and dozens of shops and vehicles were damaged in the suspected suicide attack.
- 13 November:- At least 17 people – 10 military personnel and three civilians – were killed and 60 injured when a suicide bomber rammed his explosives-laden vehicle into a military checkpost in front of the regional headquarters of the Inter-Services Intelligence (ISI) in Peshawar on Artillery Road. This was the third attack on ISI, with the first being November 2007 bombing of ISI bus in Rawalpindi and the second being the May 2009 bombing of the ISI regional headquarters in Lahore. While in Bannu, at least eight people – including seven security officials – were killed and 22 injured in a suicide attack at a local police station struck 25 minutes after the attack on the ISI building in Peshawar.
- 14 November:- At least 12 people, including a policeman and a three-year-old child, were killed and another 35 injured when a suicide bomber detonated his explosives-laden vehicle at a police checkpost in provincial capital. The bomber struck the checkpost just outside the entrance to the Peshawar Cantonment at Pishtakhara Chowk, which is situated on the junction of the Bara and Ring roads and is close to the city’s border with Khyber Agency.
- 16 November:- At least four people were killed and 20 others injured when a suicide car bomber struck a police station in Badaber near Peshawar. Police reportedly fired on the vehicle, which witnesses claimed was a pick-up truck but were unable to stop it.
- 17 November:- At least one person was killed and five others injured, including Deputy Inspector General (DIG), Nizam Shahid Durrani in a blast in Quetta. The bomb blast occurred outside the police inspector's office on Spini Road.
- 19 November:- Peshawar went through yet another day of bloodbath when two strikes, within a space of 14 hours, left 22 people dead. The first target was the city’s judicial complex, where a suicide bomber blew himself up outside a court building early in the morning, and the other came late in the night when a roadside bomb destroyed a police van. The first attack killed 20 and injured 50. It was the sixth attack on the city and it devastated a mosque, damaged a college and a police station. While the bomb attack on the police van ripped through the vehicle, killing two policemen on the spot and wounding five civilians on the outskirts of Peshawar.
- 27 November:- A remote controlled bomb near a mosque in Bajaur Agency killed anti-Taliban tribal leader Malik Shah Pur. Three others were injured.

== December ==
- 1 December:- An ANP politician, Shamsher Ali Khan, was killed and eight others injured, including his brother, in the Swat valley when a bomber targeted a guest house, at which they were present.
- 2 December:- Three naval personnel were killed and nine other people injured in an abortive suicide attack on the Pakistan Naval Complex in Sector E-8 in Islamabad on Wednesday afternoon. The teenaged suicide bomber blew himself up when he was intercepted by a naval intelligence official.
- 4 December:- At least 40 people were killed and over 86 injured when terrorists attacked a Friday congregation at the Parade Lane Askari mosque in Rawalpindi Cantonment. The high number of casualties was caused by hurling of grenades and indiscriminate targeted firing by the terrorists, reportedly numbering between six and eight individuals. Two of the terrorists blew themselves up while two others were gunned down by the security forces. The remaining terrorists escaped and took refuge in the vicinity. Besides 17 children, an army major general, a brigadier, two lieutenant colonels, a major and a number of soldiers were among those killed in the multi-pronged attack. This was the nineteenth such attack on Pakistan Army outside war zone and eighth in near GHQ Rawalpindi since the start of military campaign against the militants in the tribal areas in 2004. Meanwhile, in Chinari, Mohmand, a minibus carrying members of a wedding party struck an anti-tank mine, killing three people and wounding 15. This is the second such attack on a wedding party in the region after the attack on 23 October.
- 7 December:- Terrorists struck three provincial headquarters on Monday. The highest casualty rate was in Lahore when two powerful bomb blasts, 30 seconds apart, ripped through the busy Moon Market in Lahore’s Allama Iqbal Town at 8:45pm, claiming at least 70 lives and injuring many. The blasts, which took place within a radius of 30 metre, also caused a massive fire in a crowded shopping mall. It also knocked out electricity supply. About 150 people were injured. While in Peshawar, 11 people, including two policemen, were killed and 45 others sustained injuries when a suicide bomber blew himself up at the entrance of the sessions courts. Both of these attacks were second of their kinds this year: Moon Market was attacked on 13 August and Peshawar judicial complex was attacked on 19 November. In Quetta, 10 people were injured when a bomb went off in a residential area for government employees. In Bajaur Agency, two anti-Taliban tribal elders were assassinated by a remotely controlled bomb near a mosque.
- 8 December:- A pick-up truck packed with explosives blew up near an office of the Inter-Services Intelligence (ISI) in the Cantonment area of Multan on Tuesday, killing 12 people and injuring 47 in the third bloody militant strike in 24 hours. The commando-style gun and bomb attack was carried out by the terrorists in the Qasim Bela area of the city. At least two militants armed with guns and rocket-launchers tried to attack the ISI offices. This was the fourth time the ISI was attacked since the start of military operations in Waziristan.
- 15 December:- A bomb attack in a market in the town of Dera Ghazi Khan, in central Pakistan, has resulted in the deaths of at least 27 people. Another 50 were reported to have been injured from this bombing, which is now suspected by police to have been a car bomb. Many buildings are reported to have been badly damaged from this blast. Officials claim that a provincial official could have been the main target for this bombing, however he was not injured by this blast.
- 18 December:- A suicide bombing occurred just outside a mosque in town of Timergara in Lower Dir District. At least 12 people were killed and 28 wounded in the attack. Most of the dead were policemen who were leaving the mosque after Friday prayers. The bomber blew up his explosives-packed vehicle near the gate of the mosque.
- 19 December:- Separatist rebels killed three policemen in an attack on a patrol in the southwestern province of Baluchistan.
- 22 December:- A suicide bomber blew himself up in Peshawar, outside a club for journalists, killing at least three people and injuring another 24 more. Peshawar Press Club is reportedly a well-known landmark within the city and is often visited by many journalists.
- 24 December:- A suicide bombing in Peshawar killed at least four people and injured a dozen more. The blast occurred on a busy road, near a police and army checkpoint. While in Rawalpindi, a suicide bomber blew himself up at the entrance to an imambargah on Thursday night, leaving a little girl dead and two other people injured, including a policeman.
- 26 December:- A roadside bomb wounded at least 26 people soon after a procession of mourners passed the Khalifat Chowk in Paposh Nagar police precincts in Karachi’s North Nazimabad Town on Saturday.
- 27 December:- At least 15 people, including mourners and policemen, were killed and over 100 injured when a suicide bomber ripped through a Muharram procession near an imambargah in Muzaffarabad, Azad Kashmir on Sunday as another explosion near a Muharram procession near Orangi Town in Karachi injured 35 people. In Muzaffarabad, a suicide bomber blew himself up when intercepted by security personnel. While in the Kurram Valley, a government official Sarfaraz Siddiqi, his wife and four children were killed when militants detonated explosives at his house.
- 28 December:- At least 42 people were killed and 120 others injured when a bomber struck the Shiite procession on the M.A. Jinnah Road in Karachi near the Light House area. The blast took place inside a Shiite procession commemorating Ashura. Later enraged mourners went on a rampage following the attack, gutting shops and pelting stones at vehicles resulting in an estimated loss of Rs 30–35 billion, with more than 3,000 shops gutted in flames that were brought under control 24 hours after the rampage and 50 vehicles were burnt. The next day, the city was at a standstill with shops and markets, government offices and educational institutions closed and public and private transport off the road.
