= List of terrorist incidents in 2009 =

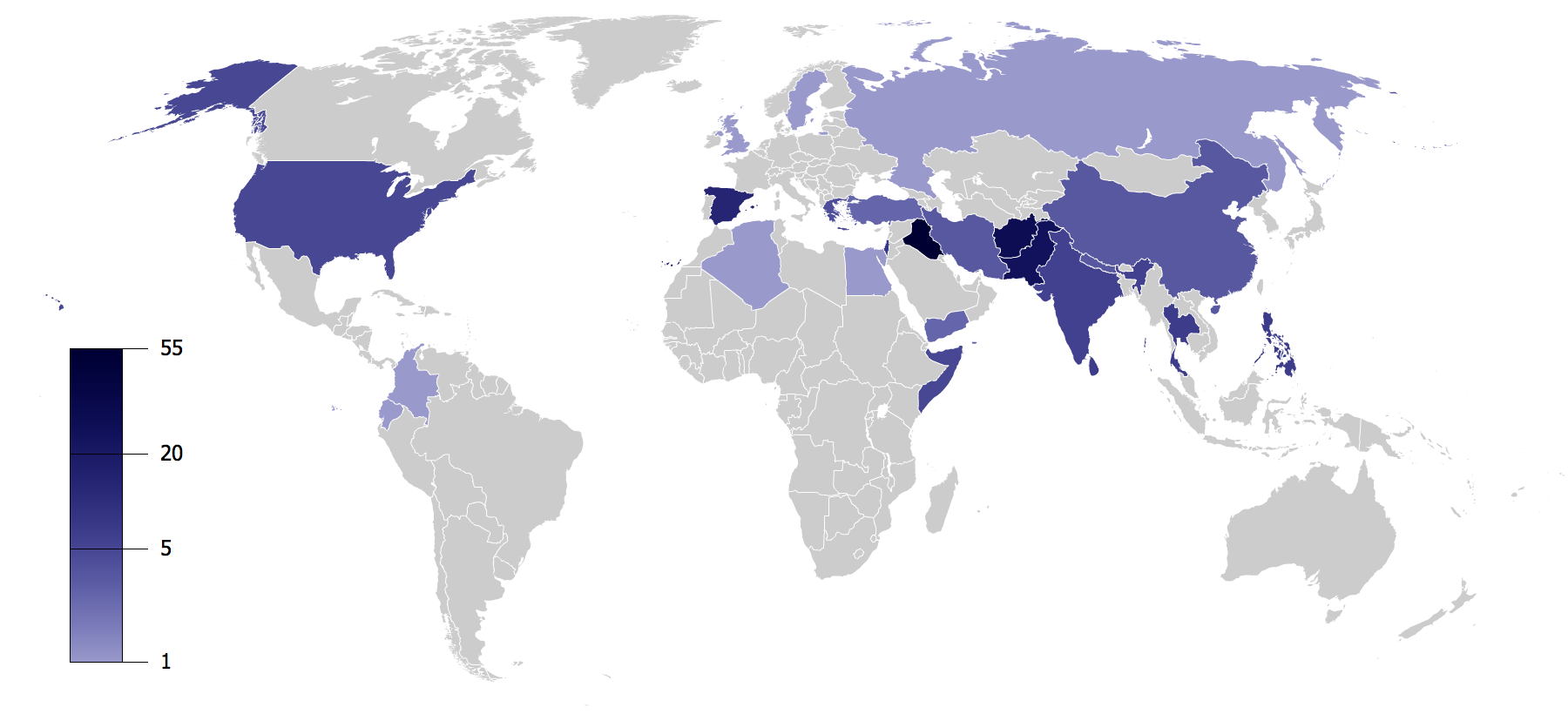
Number of terrorist incidents (January–June)

This is a timeline of incidents in 2009 that have been labelled as "terrorism" and are not believed to have been carried out by a government or its forces (see state terrorism and state-sponsored terrorism).

== Guidelines ==
- To be included, entries must be notable (have a stand-alone article) and described by a consensus of reliable sources as "terrorism".
- List entries must comply with the guidelines outlined in the manual of style under MOS:TERRORIST.
- Casualty figures in this list are the total casualties of the incident including immediate casualties and later casualties (such as people who succumbed to their wounds long after the attacks occurred).
- Casualties listed are the victims. Perpetrator casualties are listed separately (e.g. x (+y) indicate that x victims and y perpetrators were killed/injured).
- Casualty totals may be underestimated or unavailable due to a lack of information. A figure with a plus (+) sign indicates that at least that many people have died (e.g. 10+ indicates that at least 10 people have died) – the actual toll could be considerably higher. A figure with a plus (+) sign may also indicate that over that number of people are victims.
- If casualty figures are 20 or more, they will be shown in **bold**. In addition, figures for casualties more than 50 will also be **underlined**.
- Incidents are limited to one per location per day. If multiple attacks occur in the same place on the same day, they will be merged into a single incident.
- In addition to the guidelines above, the table also includes the following categories:

0 people were killed/injured by the incident.
1–19 people were killed/injured by the incident.
20–49 people were killed/injured by the incident.
50–99 people were killed/injured by the incident.
100+ people were killed/injured by the incident.

== January ==
Date	Dead	Injured	Location	Description
January 1	6	67	Guwahati, India	A serial blast killed 5 civilians and injures 67. Police believe the United Liberation Front of Assam are responsible.

== February ==
Date	Dead	Injured	Location	Description
February 20	4	50+	Colombo, Sri Lanka	Two Tamil Tigers aircraft packed with C4 explosives en route to the national airforce headquarters were shot down by the Sri Lankan military before reaching their target. 4 people including the two pilots were killed while over 50 were injured.
February 22	1	23	Khan el-Khalili, Egypt	A bomb detonated in an area of coffee shops near Al Hussein Mosque, killing a French tourist. 17 French nationals, 3 Saudis, and 3 Egyptians were wounded.
February 22	13	15	Mogadishu, Somalia	Two Al Shabeeb militants in a car detonated a bomb in an AU base, killing eleven peacekeepers from Burundi and injuring fifteen others.

== March ==
Date	Dead	Injured	Location	Description
March 7	2	4	Antrim, Northern Ireland	Two unarmed soldiers, Patrick Azimkar and Mark Quinsey, of the 38 Engineer Regiment were shot dead outside Massereene Barracks. Two other soldiers and two civilian delivery men were also shot and wounded during the attack. An Irish republican paramilitary group, the Real IRA, issued a statement claiming responsibility.
March 8	28	57	Baghdad, Iraq	A suicide bomber detonated explosives at a police academy killing 28 people and injuring 57 others.
March 9	1	0	Craigavon, Northern Ireland	PSNI officer Stephen Carroll was shot dead by a sniper. This was the first killing of a police officer in Northern Ireland since 1998. The Continuity IRA claimed responsibility for the shooting.
March 15	5	4	Shibam, Yemen	A suicide bomber detonated his suicide vest near South Korean tourists posing for pictures in a UNESCO World Heritage site referred to as the "Manhattan of the Desert". Four Koreans and a Yemeni tour guide were killed and four other foreigners and an "unspecified number of Yemenis" were wounded.
March 27	0	0	Valparaíso, Chile	An improvised device was found and detonated in a controlled explosion by members of the GOPE. The explosive was left in the window of the office of "El Mercurio de Valparaíso" newspaper. The Brigadas Autónomas y Rebeldes Norma Vergara Cáceres" claimed responsibility for the incident, claiming that it was in honor of the death of Norma Vergara Caceres, a guerrilla killed during an encounter against the Carabineros de Chile.

== April ==
Date	Dead	Injured	Location and description

== May ==
Date	Dead	Injured	Location and description

== June ==
Date	Dead	Injured	Location	Description
June 18	20	37	Beledweyne, Somalia	2009 Beledweyne bombing The National Security Minister Omar Hashi Aden was killed along with nineteen others after he was targeted by an insurgent suicide car bomb. Dozens of others were injured.
June 20	73	185	Taza, Iraq	June 2009 Taza bombing A truck bomb exploded near a mosque, killing 73 people and leaving about 185 others injured.

== July ==
Date	Dead	Injured	Location	Description
July 5	6	45~55	Cotabato City, Mindanao, Philippines	A bomb exploded outside a Roman Catholic cathedral, killing six and injuring up to 45.
July 7	6	40	Jolo and Iligan, Mindanao, Philippines	Two bombs exploded in two cities, killing six and injuring up to 40.
July 17	9	>50	Jakarta, Indonesia	9 people killed following the bombing of the JW Marriott Hotel and Ritz-Carlton.
July 29	0	65	Burgos, Spain	A car bomb containing 200 kilogrammes of explosives exploded in a 14-story barracks of the Guardia Civil. No deaths were reported, but more than 60 people were injured.
July 30	2	3	Calvià, Mallorca, Spain	A car bomb exploded outside a Guardia Civil offices, killing two Guardias Carlos Sáenz de Tejada and Diego Salva Lezaun. ETA was blamed for the attack and the authorities 'sealed' all entry and exit points to the island to prevent the terrorists' escape. Another explosive device was found under a police car hours later and deactivated by police.

== August ==
Date	Dead	Injured	Location	Description
August 15	7	91	Kabul, Afghanistan	Suicide car bomb attacks NATO headquarters of Kabul.
August 17	25	164	Nazran, Russia	At least 25 people were killed by a powerful bomb attack at a police station.

== September ==
Date	Dead	Injured	Location	Description
September 1	0	0	Mexico City, Mexico	An explosive attack was registered at the branch of a bank BBVA Bancomer and a pastry shop "El Globo", leaving only material damage. The attack was claimed by the Revuleta Verdinegra and the Subversive Front for Global Liberation.
September 17	21	10+	Mogadishu, Somalia	Two Shabaab suicide car bombers penetrated security at an African Union base and killed 21 people, including the deputy African Union commander and 16 other peacekeepers.

== October ==
Date	Dead	Injured	Location	Description
October 10	20	Several	Rawalpindi, Pakistan	10 Militants attacked the headquarters of the Pakistani military, holding hostages, nine gunmen were killed and one captured.
October 15	37	20+	Pakistan	More than 20 militants attacked police facilities in Lahore and Kohat.
October 18	31	25	Pishin, Iran	31 people died in the attack, in the province of Sistan-Baluchistan, and dozens more injured.
October 20	6	29	Islamabad, Pakistan	6 people died in an attack on the International Islamic University when two suicide bombers detonate their explosives.
October 25	155	520+	Baghdad, Iraq	Two vehicles detonated in the Green Zone, killing at least 155 and injuring 520.
October 28	117	200+	Peshawar, Pakistan	A car bomb detonated in a woman exclusive shopping district, and over 110 die with 200 or more injured.

== November ==
Date	Dead	Injured	Location	Description
November 2	35	60	Rawalpindi, Pakistan	Two suicide bombers on bicycles detonated their bombs in front of a bank
November 5	13	30	Killeen, Texas, United States	Nidal Malik Hasan, serving as a Major in the United States Army, opened fire killing 13 and wounding 30 at Fort Hood.
November 19	19	51	Peshawar, Pakistan	A bombing occurred outside a local court
November 27	26	90+	Bologoye, Russia	A bomb detonated on a track and derailed a train of the Nevsky Express, travelling from Moscow to St Petersburg, killing 26 people and injuring up to another 90 more. No group has claimed responsibility, though Chechen separatists and rebels in the North Caucasus are believed to be the most likely perpetrators for this attack

== December ==
Date	Dead	Injured	Location	Description
December 3	24	60	Mogadishu, Somalia	A male suicide bomber disguised as a woman detonated in a hotel meeting hall. The hotel was hosting a graduation ceremony for local medical students when the blast went off, killing four government ministers as well as other civilians.
December 4	38	80	Rawalpindi, Pakistan	Four gunmen attacked a mosque frequented by current and former Pakistani military personnel. Security forces responded and a gun battle erupted, followed by three of the attackers detonating themselves.
December 7	48	100	Lahore, Pakistan	Two bomb blasts ripped through a busy market. The attack, which injured some 100 people, sparked a huge blaze at the Moon Market.
December 8	2	9	Narathiwat, Thailand	A motorcycle bomb exploded in a crowded market, killing two and injuring nine, just before a visit by the Malaysian and Thai premiers. The incident was blamed on Islamic separatists.
December 8	127	448	Baghdad, Iraq	A series of bombings killed at least 127 people and injured 448 others, making it the deadliest attack in Iraq since the October 2009 Baghdad bombings.
December 15	33	50	Dera Ghazi Khan, Pakistan	A bomb blast hit a market.
December 18	12	28	Lower Dir District, Pakistan	A suicide bomber detonated near a mosque used by police officers.
December 25	0	3	United States	Nigerian Umar Farouk Abdulmutallab attempted to detonate an explosive on an aircraft en route from Amsterdam to Detroit. The suspect set himself on fire until he was extinguished and overpowered by two passengers. The aircraft landed safely in Detroit with the only injuries reported to be the suspect and two others.
December 28	43	60	Karachi, Pakistan	A suicide bomber detonates at a crowded Shia Muslim procession.
December 31	0	0	Paraguay	EPP members attacked a small military outpost in the San Pedro Department, stealing weapons and burning it to the ground.
