= November 2009 Rawalpindi bombing =

Terrorist incident in Pakistan

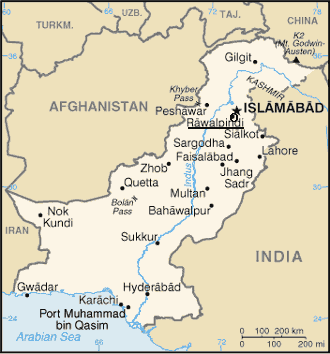
- Rawalpindi
- Location: Mall Road, Saddar, Rawalpindi
- Date: 2 November 2009; 1040 hrs (PST+5)
- Attack type: Suicide attack
- Deaths: 35
- Injuries: 60

The November 2009 Rawalpindi bombing was a suicide attack carried out in front of the Mall Road branch of National Bank of Pakistan in Rawalpindi, Pakistan. The blast area was considered to be a very safe and high-security place. Tehrik-i-Taliban, an internationally designated terrorist group, was blamed for the deadly blast, which occurred when the Pakistan government announced £3m in rewards for the capture of the Taliban leadership.

== Blast ==
The blast was carried out by a suicide bomber, who was riding a motorcycle and blew himself up outside a local bank, situated near Shalimar and the Pearl Continental hotels.

A witness to the blast said, "We were sitting on the second floor of our office. It was a huge blast, our building shook as if in an earthquake, and when we came out there was smoke everywhere and body parts were thrown into our office."

Rescue teams arrived at the blast area and an emergency was declared in major hospitals. Many education institutions were closed in the city and security teams were deployed in the sensitive areas.

== Reaction ==
The blast provoked condemnations from President Asif Ali Zardari, Prime Minister Yousaf Raza Gillani, and many religious leaders and local politicians.

== See also ==
- List of terrorist incidents in Pakistan since 2001
- List of terrorist incidents, 2009
- December 2009 Rawalpindi attack
