= 2009 Mindanao bombings =

Terrorist attacks in Datu Piang, Jolo, Cotabato, and Iligan in Mindanao, Philippines

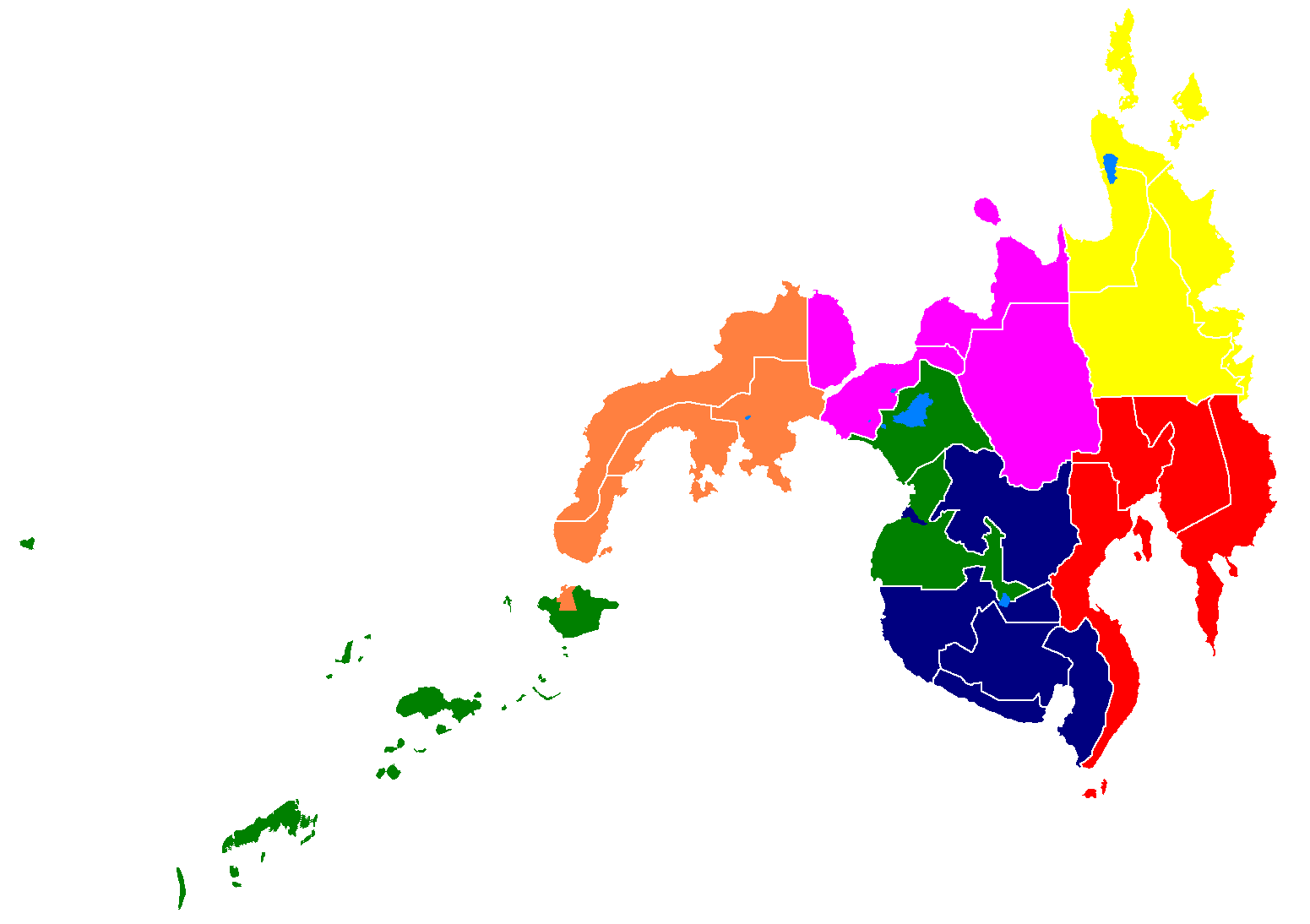
- Colour-coded map of the Mindanao archipelago
- Location: Datu Piang, Cotabato, Jolo, and Iligan in Mindanao, Philippines
- Date: July 4, 5 and 7, 2009 (PST, UTC+8)
- Attack type: Bombing
- Deaths: 8 (Note: The number of people who died in the attack in Cotabato are 6. Only 2 people died in Jolo, even though initial reports stated 6. No one died in Datu Piang and Iligan.)
- Injuries: 66–95 (Note: Reports of the number of people injured in the attack in Cotabato range from "at least 26" to 55, depending on the source, with mid-range figures of 29, "at least 34", and 45.)

The Mindanao bombings was a series of seemingly unrelated bomb attacks that took place on July 4, 5, and 7, 2009 in the towns of Datu Piang and Jolo, and the cities of Cotabato and Iligan in Mindanao, Philippines. The bombings killed 8 people and injured at least 66. The Armed Forces of the Philippines has blamed several militant organizations active in Mindanao, such as the Moro Islamic Liberation Front (MILF), the Abu Sayyaf, and Jemaah Islamiyah.

The Roman Catholic Church and its leader Pope Benedict XVI condemned the initial attack. A statement from the MILF said the attack was carried out by "heartless people" and called for an independent investigation to determine who was responsible. They also said, "there's no religious conflict in the south" and "we're fighting for our right of self-determination". A press secretary to President Gloria Macapagal Arroyo expressed confidence that the bombing would not collapse peace negotiations between the government and the MILF.

Several members of the opposition said that these attacks may be related to a possible plan by the government to place the country in emergency rule, alluding to the days of Martial Law under former president Ferdinand Marcos. Others have said they may be in preparation to heighten security amid the State of the Nation Address by Arroyo, which may restrict demonstrations and protest. The government rejected these claims and said they were assessing the situation. Security was increased in Metro Manila, the seat of government, and in other areas of the country, particularly Mindanao. A day after the incidents, the UN Development Program, meanwhile, announced it was suspending its operations for refugees in the south.

== Datu Piang and Cotabato ==
The night before the Mindanao attacks, a bomb exploded in the nearby town of Datu Piang. At approximately 8:50 a.m. in Cotabato City, a bomb exploded near a lechón food stall, across the street from the Roman Catholic Cathedral of the Immaculate Conception during Sunday Mass as a military truck drove by, killing five people and injuring up to 55 more. The dead included at least one member of the Citizen Armed Force Geographical Unit, a street food vendor, and a three-year-old boy. According to initial police reports, two soldiers standing guard near the cathedral were killed by the blast. Five soldiers were injured in the explosion. A sixth victim, an injured infant, died later in hospital.

According to Philippine Army spokesman Colonel Jonathan Ponce, the bomb consisted of a mortar shell and was detonated remotely using a mobile telephone. Witnesses reported that the cathedral did not sustain significant damage. Shortly after the attack, security forces arrested a man suspected of planting the bomb. He was arrested while carrying a second device into the cathedral, according to police.

The military blamed the bombing on rogue elements of the Moro Islamic Liberation Front (MILF), a secessionist Islamic organization active in the southern Philippines. Ponce said, "The rebels are getting desperate and they are no longer choosing their targets. They are now attacking even places of worship." MILF leader Mohaqher Iqbal denied that the militant group carried out the attack, stating: "There's no religious conflict in the south [of the Philippines]. We're fighting for our right of self-determination."

The attack drew condemnation from the Roman Catholic Church—including from its leader Pope Benedict XVI—Philippine government officials, and the MILF. Archbishop Orlando Quevedo, head of the Roman Catholic Archdiocese of Cotabato, said the bombing was "not just a crime, [but] a sacrilege" and called for prayer "for the conversion of the bombers". A spokesperson for the MILF, Eid Kabalu, condemned the attack by "heartless people" and called for an independent investigation to determine who was responsible. Cerge Remonde, press secretary to President Gloria Macapagal Arroyo, expressed confidence that the bombing would not collapse peace negotiations between the government and the MILF.

== Jolo and Iligan ==
Another bomb attack occurred on July 7, 2009, in Jolo on the southern Philippine island of Sulu. An improvised explosive device (IED) was placed inside a motorcycle, according to Superintendent Jose Bayani Gucela of the Philippine National Police; it detonated in downtown Jolo at 7:55 a.m. outside a hardware store, killing six people. The store's owner was one of the fatalities. Approximately forty people were injured in the explosion. It exploded about 100 metres (330 ft) from the Mount Carmel Church. According to Gucela, police discovered two more unexploded devices within a similar radius around the church. Lieutenant Colonel Edgard Arevalo, a spokesman for the Philippine Navy, said most of those wounded in the blast were in critical condition. Arevalo also said that, according to initial reports, locals had notified police of a parked motorcycle with wires connected to it, and that the explosion occurred as police were responding. Public officials in Jolo suspended school classes, fearing that additional attacks could follow. The authorities later said there had been only two fatalities rather than six.

Approximately two to three hours after the blast in Jolo, a bomb exploded in Iligan City in a car parked near a pawnshop. The explosion injured between seven and thirteen people, including up to three soldiers, but caused no deaths. The bomb exploded next to a Philippine Army "mini-cruiser"; however, Lt Col Juvymax Uy said the soldiers "were likely not the target of the blast".

The attacks in Jolo and Iligan came two days after the blast in Cotabato City, but the military "ruled out the possibility" that the bombings were related. Major General Juancho Sabban identified the Abu Sayyaf Group, which is based in Jolo, as the most likely perpetrators of the attack in Jolo, while saying that Iligan is located in an area "affected" by the MILF. Sabban said investigators were also considering Jemaah Islamiyah as possible culprits.

Eid Kabalu, the civil-military affairs chief of the MILF, was quoted by the Philippine Daily Inquirer as saying, "We tend to believe former [Philippine House of Representatives] Speaker Jose de Venecia’s view that this is part of a national grand design leading to a military takeover" of the country due to ongoing apprehensions over ruling party congressmen's fforts to form a constituent assembly to amend the Constitution and extend President Arroyo's rule. In the interview, Kabalu said the bomb attacks' not being confined to Mindanao was "a very clear sign" backing the "grand design" theory. He assailed the military for blaming the bomb attacks on the MILF.

== Aftermath ==
The Philippine government held an emergency meeting immediately after the incidents to assess possible implications. A reward of one million pesos was offered for anyone who could provide information leading to the arrests of the bombers. On July 8, 2009, the United Nations Development Program announced it had halted its feeding program to the island's estimated 340,000–578,000 refugees displaced by the recent fighting between the government and rebel forces. Security was increased all over the archipelago, particularly in Metro Manila and its financial center, Makati.

House Speaker Prospero Nograles stated, "regardless of creed or religion and political inclinations, we all must act to end these series of criminal acts". Bayan Muna representative Teddy Casiño said the only people benefiting from the situation was the President's administration, and that "[t]he lack of conclusive information... reinforces the suspicion that either there is a failure of intelligence or the obfuscation is deliberately orchestrated to divert the public's attention from the ... threat of emergency rule". These statements followed allegations that the government intended to reinstate Martial Law, similar to that of Ferdinand Marcos in 1972.

The bombings occurred within days of a visit by of CIA chief Leon Panetta, who was due to meet with President Arroyo about the country's security relation with the United States, particularly about the current situation of the U.S. military's presence in the southern Philippines. They also preceded the final State of the Nation Address on July 27 by the Philippine president before ending her term, which led to several opposition senators saying that these attacks may have been a ploy to heighten security in the capital, restricting possible protests and demonstrations against her.

== See also ==
- List of terrorist incidents, 2009
- Terrorism in the Philippines
