= October 2009 Lahore attacks =

Terrorist incident in Pakistan

- Location of Lahore (in red) in Punjab, Pakistan and (inset) Punjab in Pakistan.
- Location: Lahore, Punjab, Pakistan
- Date: 15 October 2009; 9.40 – (UTC+05.00)
- Attack type: Shooting and hostage taking
- Deaths: 5 to 7 including 3 FIA men, 1 attacker, 1 unidentified. 1 Police constable at Elite Force Training Centre. 38 in total.
- Injuries: 7 at Elite Police Academy in Bedian.
- No. of participants: 4 at Federal Investigation Agency's regional headquarters. Up to 20 in total.
- Defenders: Elite Police, Pakistan Rangers

The October 2009 Lahore attacks were simultaneous assaults on three buildings across Lahore, Punjab, Pakistan, on 15 October 2009, around 9:15 am local time. The attacks killed 38 and wounded at least 20. One group of militants attacked the Regional Headquarters of the Federal Investigation Agency (FIA), while a second group raided the Manawan Police Training School. The third team of militants attacked the Elite Police Academy.

== Background ==
The same Federal Investigation Agency regional headquarters was hit by a suicide car bomb in March 2008. Earlier in the day, a suicide car bomber blew himself up at a police station in Kohat. These and other events have led to Pakistan's preparation for a major operation in Waziristan.

== Federal Investigation Agency: Regional Headquarters ==
According to Punjab Home Secretary Nadeem Hassan Asif, the Federal Investigation Agency's regional headquarters in Lahore was attacked by four individuals. Initial shots killed two attackers, including a suicide bomber. Hostages were taken, including FIA officials; the government responded with a siege lasting 90 minutes. In the end, four government employees, including three FIA agents, and a bystander were killed.

== Elite Force Training Academy ==
The Elite Police Academy, situated at Bedian Road 5 kilometers from the Manawan Police Training School (which was also targeted) was attacked by six men in militia uniforms. Six policemen and five militants were killed. Only one militant was killed by the police; the three others were suicide bombers. The battle lasted until afternoon; in the aftermath, a family which was being held hostage was freed.

== Manawan Police Training School ==
Four attackers were dropped off at the training center in a Suzuki van around 9:10 am local time. Two attackers shot and killed the guard at the gate, and then entered the center by scaling the main gate. The two other attackers followed, throwing grenades on their way. One went to the kitchen, another to the patients' barracks, and a third to the barber's salon. One was spotted and gunned down on the lawn. Nine policemen were killed and fifty were injured in the attack, which lasted until about 11:50 am. .

== Responsibility ==
Many such attacks over the past year have been carried out by Taliban or Punjabi militant groups, or, as in the army headquarters attack on 10 October 2009, a combination of both. According to GEO News, the Tehrik-e-Taliban Pakistan claimed responsibility for the attack.

== Investigations ==
At least 9 people having links with group behind the attack have been apprehend. A large amount of ammunitions, and maps of sensitive installations were recovered.

== Pakistan reactions ==
- President Asif Ali Zardari said that this violence will not deter the government from eliminating the extremism.
- Interior Minister Rehman Malik said, "The enemy has started a guerrilla war. The whole nation should be united against these handful of terrorists, and God willing we will defeat them."
- Punjab Provincial Law Minister Rana Sanaullah said that the police were trying to take some of the militants alive so information could be extracted from them.

== See also ==
- 2009 Lahore police academy attacks
- List of terrorist incidents in Pakistan since 2001
