= December 2009 Rawalpindi attack =

Terrorist attack in Pakistan

Coordinates: 33°35′56″N 73°02′09″E

- Location: mosque located on Parade Lane, Rawalpindi
- Date: 4 December 2009; Around 12:00 pm (noon) (PST+5)
- Attack type: Suicide attack, shooting
- Deaths: 40
- Injuries: 80+

The December 2009 Rawalpindi attack in Rawalpindi, Pakistan was a terrorist attack on a mosque during Friday prayers on 4 December 2009. The mosque is located near the Pakistan Army's headquarters in Rawalpindi, is surrounded by military houses and is frequented by retired and serving officers.

== The attack on the mosque ==
Five armed suicide attackers opened fire on and hurled grenades at the crowd of about 150 worshipers, gathered for prayers in the mosque on Parade Lane. Security forces soon arrived on the scene to engage the terrorists; All five of the militants died by either blowing themselves up or fighting the soldiers inside the mosque. The area around the mosque was cordoned off and the security forces initiated a search for more attackers in the area. Helicopters were also used.

Approximately 37 people were killed instantly, while 61 others were injured, including women and children. The victims were mostly retired and serving officers. Eyewitnesses reported that the victims were fired upon at close range and the mosque was badly damaged in the attack. The roof of the mosque has collapsed. No group has claimed responsibility. An eyewitness reported the worshipers had to pass through "tight security", including metal detectors to enter the mosque. Senior police official Aslam Tarin suggested the attackers may have entered the mosque by scaling the mosque wall.

There is speculation that the attack was in retaliation for the Pakistan army's campaign into the Taliban stronghold of South Waziristan. Killed in the attack were nine army personnel including Major General Bilal Omer Khan, a brigadier, two lieutenant colonels and two majors; deputy director of NLC, Taskeen Anjum as well as many children belonging to the families of Army men such as Hashim Masood Aslam, the only son of Lt. Gen Masood Aslam who is the commander of XI Corps (Pakistan). General Muhammad Yusaf Khan former Chief of Army Staff (VCOAS) under Pervez Musharraf was injured in the attack.

== Victims ==
The names of the victims released by the Inter-Services Public Relations (ISPR):

=== Army personnel ===
- Major General Bilal Omer Khan
- Brigadier Abdul Rauf
- Lieutenant Colonel Fakhar
- Lieutenant Colonel Manzoor Saeed
- Major Zahid
- Major (retd) Shoaib
- Naik Masood
- Sepoy Abdul Qayyum
- Sepoy Sarwar

=== Civilians ===
- Bilal Riaz, son of Major General Nasim Riaz
- Ali Hassan, son of Colonel Shabbir
- Hassan, son of Colonel Shukhran
- Hashim, son of Major General Masood Aslam
- Sadaul Hassan, son of Lieutenant Colonel Fakhar
- Zamin, son of Engineer Akmal Hussain
- Qaisar Khan, son of Syed Akbar
- Adil Rauf, son of Abdul Rauf
- Mohammad Khan, son of Sultan Bakhsh
- Fazal Khan, son of Madad Khan
- Son of Brigadier (retd) Sadiq
- Son of Brigadier Mumtaz
- Son of Colonel Qaiser
- Son of Colonel Kaleem Zubair
- Son of Lieutenant Colonel Shoaib
- Son of Major Saleem
- Son of Major Ahsan
- Father of Maj-Gen Awais Mustafa
- Father of Colonel Kaleem Zubair
- Father of Lt-Col Farooq Awan
- National Logistics Corporation Deputy Director Taskeen Anjum
- Khalid Javed
- Ghulam Mujtaba
- Javed
- Mohammad Fiaz
- Asad
- An unidentified individual

== Aftermath ==
Tehrik-i-Taliban Pakistan said that responsibility for the attack in an email sent to CNN and stated "We once again mention that we are not against the innocent people and the state of Pakistan but against those officers and ministers who are American by hearts and minds and Pakistani just by faces".

== See also ==
- List of terrorist incidents in Pakistan since 2001
- List of terrorist incidents, 2009
