= Usterzai =

- Union Council
- Country: Pakistan
- Province: Khyber Pakhtunkhwa
- District: Kohat
- Time zone: UTC+5 (PST)

Usterzai is an administrative unit (known as union council) of Kohat District in the Khyber Pakhtunkhwa province of Pakistan.

Kohat District has 2 tehsils, Kohat and Lachi. Each Tehsil comprises a certain number of union councils. There are 32 union councils in district Kohat.

In 2009, a suicide car bombing killed over 30 people in Usterzai.
