= 2009 Palma Nova bombing =

Coordinates: 39°30′53.58″N 2°32′3.37″E

- Part of the Basque conflict
- Location: Palma Nova, Calvià, Majorca, Balearic Islands, Spain
- Date: 30 July 2009; 13.50 (UTC+2)
- Target: Civil Guard barracks
- Attack type: Limpet bomb
- Deaths: 2
- Perpetrator: ETA

The 2009 Palma Nova bombing occurred on 30 July 2009, when a limpet bomb went off outside a Civil Guard barracks in the town of Palma Nova, Majorca, Spain. The bomb was placed under a patrol car and two Civil Guard officers died as a result of the explosion. A second device was found under another Civil Guard vehicle at nearby barracks and safely exploded by police. On 9 August, the Basque nationalist and separatist organisation ETA claimed responsibility for the attack, while four other bombs exploded around restaurants and shopping centres in Palma, Majorca, causing no injuries.

The bombing was ETA's first attack in Majorca since it tried to kill King Juan Carlos I in the summer of 1995, and its deadliest attack since it killed two Civil Guard officers in Capbreton, France in 2007. The attack came on the eve of the 50th anniversary of ETA's founding, and days before the King's yearly visit to Majorca.

== Background ==
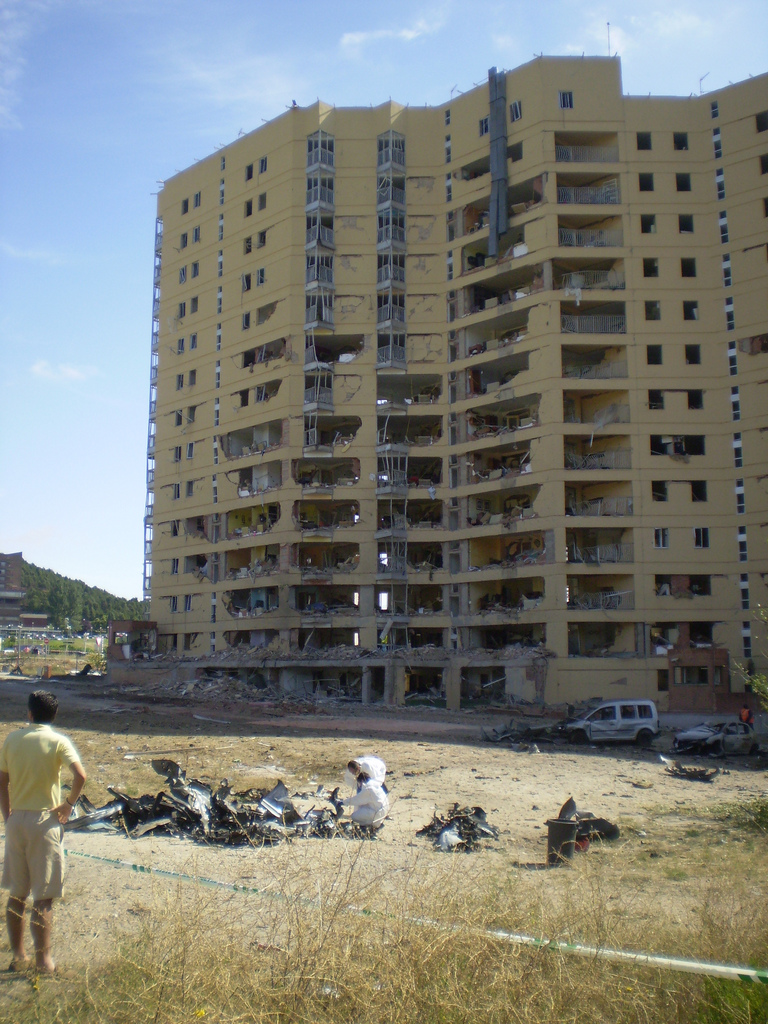
Investigators sift through debris at the Burgos Civil Guard barracks

In mid-2006, the organisation declared a ceasefire, and conversations between Batasuna, ETA and the Basque and Spanish governments started. Peace talks ended in December, when ETA broke the truce with a massive car bomb at the Madrid-Barajas Airport. ETA officially ended the ceasefire in 2007 and resumed its attacks around Spain. At the same time, dozens of members were arrested by Spanish and French police. Despite that, the organisation did not lose the capacity of carrying out attacks.

In 2009, Patxi López became the first non-nationalist lendakari since the 1979 Statute of Autonomy of the Basque Country. On 19 June, ETA killed inspector Eduardo Puelles García in Arrigorriaga near Bilbao, Biscay, when a bomb attached to his car exploded, and on 9 July, a powerful bomb exploded in a Socialist Workers' Party local office in Durango, Biscay, causing no injuries. In late July, it was reported that ETA was preparing its "summer campaign", with Spanish police looking for several vans the organisation had ready to explode. On 29 July, a van loaded with 300 kilograms (660 lb) of explosives went off in front of a Civil Guard barracks in Burgos, injuring 70, including women and children.

The bombing was the first time since 2007 in which ETA killed more than one person in one of its attacks. On 2 December 2007, two undercover Civil Guards were shot dead in the French town of Capbreton, Aquitaine. It was also the deadliest attack in Spanish soil since the Madrid-Barajas Airport.

The attack was the first time ETA had killed in Majorca, one of the Spanish regions less targeted by ETA. On 18 August 1977, a bomb was deactivated next to a seafront walk. On 31 July 1991, two people were injured after two bombs went off in Palma. Two months later, a car bomb was defused in Palma's main beach. In the summer of 1995, Spanish authorities dismantled a cell of ETA ready to shoot king Juan Carlos I. In 2005, the organisation attempted the magnicide once more in Majorca.

== Attack ==
At 13.50, a 3 kilograms (6.6 lb) bomb placed under a Civil Guard Nissan Patrol went off, killing officers Carlos Saénz de Tejada García and Diego Salva Lezaun. One of the officers died instantly, while paramedics failed to resuscitate the other officer. Both officers were inside the car when the bomb exploded. The vehicle had been parked in the Na Boira street, in front of a government-owned building used as a post office and Civil Guard barracks, among other functions. Many hotels are located in the area, something which caused many foreign tourists, mainly German and British, to witness the blast.

After the attack, authorities started to look for other possible bombs in the area, with the Civil Guard giving the order to search in all barracks on the island. Soon after, a detection dog found a bomb attached to another Civil Guard Nissan Patrol parked in front of a barracks located 1 kilometre (0.62 mi) from where the first bomb had exploded. The area was cordoned off and people evacuated from nearby houses and hotels. At 18.30, Civil Guard bomb disposal officers TEDAX carried out a controlled explosion. The bomb had been placed in a broken down vehicle and was therefore not in use.

=== Victims ===
- Diego Salvá Lezaun (Pamplona, 1981) lived in Majorca and became a Givil Guard on 25 August 2008. He started working as an intern on 31 January 2009. A few months later, he suffered a motorbike accident which left him several weeks in coma. Once he recovered, he was assigned to the Palma Nova barracks, just four days before the attack took place. He was buried in Palma.
- Carlos Sáenz de Tejada García (Burgos, 1980) tried to join the National Police Corps after finishing his high school studies. He failed to do so and became a member of the Spanish Army, being stationed in an army barracks in Castrillo del Val. He joined the Civil Guard on 18 February 2008, and was sent to Majorca on 19 July. He had some relatives affected by the 29 July bombing in Burgos, where he was buried.

== Aftermath ==
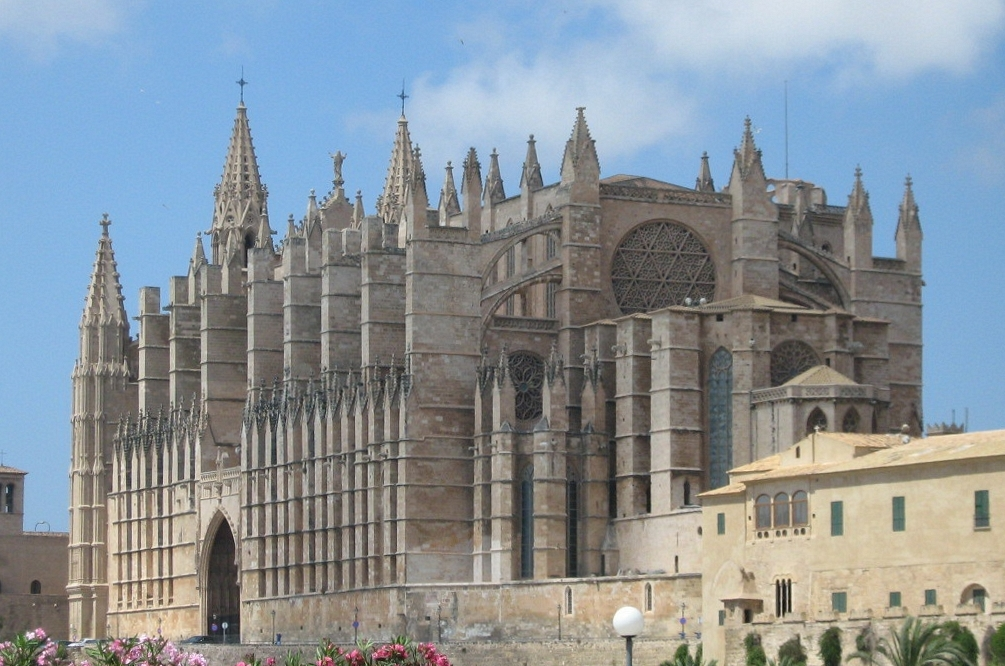
Cathedral of Santa Maria

On 31 July, a funeral was held at the Cathedral of Santa Maria in Palma. The service was attended by Prime Minister José Luis Rodríguez Zapatero and Prince and Princess of Asturias, Felipe and Letizia. Other people attending the mass were leader of the opposition Mariano Rajoy, Minister of the Interior Alfredo Pérez Rubalcaba and Patxi López, among others. At least 2,000 gathered outside of the cathedral and a minute of silence was held across Spain in memory of the dead.

=== Operation Cage ===
Right after the attack, and suspecting that the bombers were still on the island, the Civil Guard and the National Police Corps launched a lockdown, an operation named Operation Cage (Spanish: Operación Jaula), the biggest manhunt in the history of the island. Similar operations had been done around Spain in other attacks, such as in the 2004 Madrid train bombings. Checkpoints were set up across the island, while the Palma de Mallorca Airport and all ports were temporarily closed. The airport was closed at 4:00 pm and was re-opened at 5:55 pm, with several flights being delayed. During the rest of the afternoon, the ports were re-opened as well.

The day after the attack, Spanish police released the picture of six members of ETA who could have possibly taken part in the bombing. Police named the suspects as Itziar Martínez Moreno, Iratxe Yáñez Ortiz de Barrón, Alberto Beraza Machain, Oroitz Gurruchaga Gogorza, Joanes Larretxea Mendiola and Iván Sáez de Jáuregui Ortigosa, although no direct evidence linked them to the attack. Meanwhile, at least 1600 police officers were deployed to keep checking around the island, including on fisherman. The intense search was still active in mid August.

=== Reactions ===
During a press conference at the Moncloa Palace, Rodríguez Zapatero blamed both bombings "on the terrorist group ETA" and vowed to bring all of its members to justice: "They have no chance to hide, they can't flee, they can't escape justice, they will be arrested, they will be sentenced, they will spend their lives in jail". When arriving on Majorca on 1 August for his yearly summer holidays King Juan Carlos I condemned the attack and vowed to "go on and on hitting them in the head and we must fight to stop them". Condemnation also came from governments worldwide following the bombing:

- (Europe) The European Commission condemned the bombing and gave its "total solidarity to the Spanish people and institutions".
- (Germany) German Chancellor Angela Merkel condemned the attack, and gave Rodriguez Zapatero her support in "the fight against terrorism".
- (Mexico) The Mexican Secretariat of Foreign Affairs condemned the killing.
- Then Foreign Minister of Argentina Jorge Taiana condemned the Majorca and Burgos attacks.

== August bombings ==
On 9 August, the same day ETA claimed responsibility for the July 30 attack, four bombs exploded in three restaurants and one shopping centre around Palma. The bombs, which contained small amounts of explosives and caused little damage and no injuries, went off after three warning calls from ETA. At 11:16 am local time, a man speaking on behalf of ETA called the firefighters of Calvià, warning that three bombs would go off in Palma. Half an hour later, another person also speaking on behalf of ETA called a taxi company in Gipuzkoa, giving details of the location and time the bombs would explode. Finally, another warning call was mistakenly made to the personal mobile phone of an inhabitant of Córdoba. Authorities reported that the bombers had given contradicting details in each call, leading to confusion on the location of the bombs.

The first bomb exploded at 12:00 pm in the bar "Nica", located in the avenue Comte de Sallent. The explosion was at first not reported, with authorities believing it was a gas explosion. The second bomb exploded at around 2:25 pm in the "La Rigoletta" restaurant, in front of one of Palma's main beaches. The third bomb went off at around 4:00 pm in another restaurant, named "Enco". The fourth device exploded around 6:00 pm in a shopping mall located next to the main square of Palma. As a result of the few details given by the warning calls, police failed to evacuate the attacked restaurants. Nonetheless, no one was injured.

== Investigation ==
Authorities rapidly ruled out the possibility that ETA had a cell in the island, with police believing the attack had been carried out by a unit that had travelled to the island specifically to carry it out. Initial reports stated that the bombers had set the bomb off with a remote control. Once the second bomb was spotted, police announced that it had a timer device, which could have allowed the members of ETA to plant the bomb several days before the attack and leave the island. Earlier, Government delegate for Majorca, Ramon Socías, had said that security forces believed that the bombers had not left Majorca, and were hiding on the island, waiting for the situation to cool down before attempting to leave.

Regarding the 8 August bombings, Alfredo Pérez Rubalcaba did not rule out any possibility, although he confirmed that the hypothesis of the bombers leaving the island before the attack was "reasonable", due to the timer devices. All of the bombs had been planted in women's toilets, which led authorities to believe that they had been set by one of the two female suspects, Itziar Martínez Moreno and Iratxe Yáñez Ortiz.

=== Arrests ===
On 19 August, Alberto Matxain Beraza was arrested in the French town of Le Corbier in Savoy, next to the French Alps. He was held along with fellow ETA members Aitzol Etxaburu and Andoni Sarasola. They were responsible for ETA's logistics operation, and had the job of supplying weapons and explosives to the ETA cells operating in Spanish soil. The arrest led to the discovery of almost a tone of explosives, hidden by ETA in 12 small caches around France. On 11 October, Joanes Larretxea was arrested in Rivières, Gard, along with top ETA member Lurgi Mendinueta Mintegi.

Iratxe Yañez Ortiz was arrested on 10 January 2010, in Portugal after she was stopped in a routine traffic check-point in the Spanish town of Bermillo de Sayago, next to Spain-Portugal border. Yañez Ortiz was arrested along another member of ETA, Garikoitz García Arrieta, who was driving a van containing 10 kilograms (22 lb) of explosives, two pistols, a rifle and bomb-making material. She was extradited to Spain on 28 October 2010.

== See also ==
- List of ETA attacks
- List of terrorist incidents, 2009
