= Mohammed Aqeel =

Pakistani terrorist (died 2014)

- Born: محمد عقیل
- Died: 19 December 2014
- Cause of death: Hanging
- Other name: Dr. Usman
- Occupation: Terrorist

Mohammed Aqeel (Urdu: محمد عقیل; alias Dr. Usman) (died 19 December 2014) was a member of the banned terrorist organization Lashkar-e-Jhangvi and former soldier in Pakistan Army Medical Corps where he worked until 2006. He belonged to Kahuta Tehsil in Punjab.

== Crimes ==
Aqeel was suspected of involvement in the assassination of Lieutenant General Mushtaq Ahmed Baig, the Surgeon General of the Army Medical Corps, in February 2008. Aqeel was also arrested in connection with the Islamabad Marriott Hotel bombing in September 2008.

Aqeel was the suspected mastermind of the 2009 attack on the Sri Lanka national cricket team on 3 March 2009. On 9 March 2009, he managed to escape ahead of an early morning police raid on his hideout. He was also suspected of an attack on retired General Pervez Musharraf. He was said to have fled to the Federally Administered Tribal Areas several days prior to the raid.

Months later Aqeel took part in the attack on the Pakistan Army General Headquarters in Rawalpindi. He was captured in October 2009 while holding hostages and trying to blow himself up; Aqeel was injured in the process.

== Death sentence ==
In 2011, Aqeel was sentenced to death by a military court. During the government of Asif Ali Zardari, he filed a mercy plea but it was rejected.

After the 2014 Peshawar school attack, the moratorium on capital punishment was lifted in terror-related cases by Nawaz Sharif, after which Aqeel along with Arshad Mehmood, who was convicted of an assassination attempt on General Pervez Musharraf, were scheduled for execution. On the evening of 19 December 2014, Aqeel and Arshad were both hanged at Faisalabad Jail.
