= Terrorist incidents in Pakistan in 2005 =

This is a list of terrorist incidents in Pakistan in 2005.

== January- March ==
- 8 January:- At least 10 people were killed in sectarian violence in the city of Gilgit, Gilgit-Baltistan. The shooting of a Shia Muslim cleric earlier sparked clashes between his supporters and Deobandis.
- 19 March:- At least 35 people were killed and many others injured when a Sipah-e-Sahaba terrorist detonated himself in a mixed crowd of Shia and Deobandi devotees at the shrine of Pir Rakhel Shah in the remote village of Fatehpur in Jhal Magsi District, Balochistan.

== May ==
- 25 May:- Six members of a family were killed in an explosion at the village of Bandkhel in Makin Subdivision, South Waziristan, Federally Administered Tribal Areas.
- 27 May:- At least 20 people were killed and 82 others wounded due by a suicide bombing at the annual Shia Muslim gathering at the shrine of Bari Imam in Islamabad.
- 31 May:- Six bodies were recovered from a fast food outlet set ablaze by an angry mob in retaliation to the suicide attack on the Shia mosque in central Karachi where five people were killed and about 20 others wounded.

== September - December ==
- 22 September:- At least six people were killed and 27 others injured in two bomb blasts in Lahore. Police said the bombs went off within an interval of one and a half hours.
- 7 October:- Eight members of the Ahmadiyya faith were killed inside a mosque as worshippers were performing salah. The attack occurred in Mandi Bahauddin, Punjab.
- 13 October:- Around 12 people including students were killed in the curfew and clashes between the Rangers and civilians in Gilgit. The clashes came after the death of a student in Rangers custody.
- 15 November:- A car bomb exploded outside a Kentucky Fried Chicken restaurant in Karachi. At least three people were killed and eight others wounded.
- 8 December:- At least 12 people were killed and 30 others injured in a bombing in the town of Jandola in South Waziristan.
- 22 December:- At least seven people were killed in what officials say was a battle between Islamic students and bandits in Jandola.
