= 2009 Burgos bombing =

2009 terrorist attack in Burgos, Spain

Coordinates: 42°21′23″N 3°41′36″W

- Part of the Basque conflict
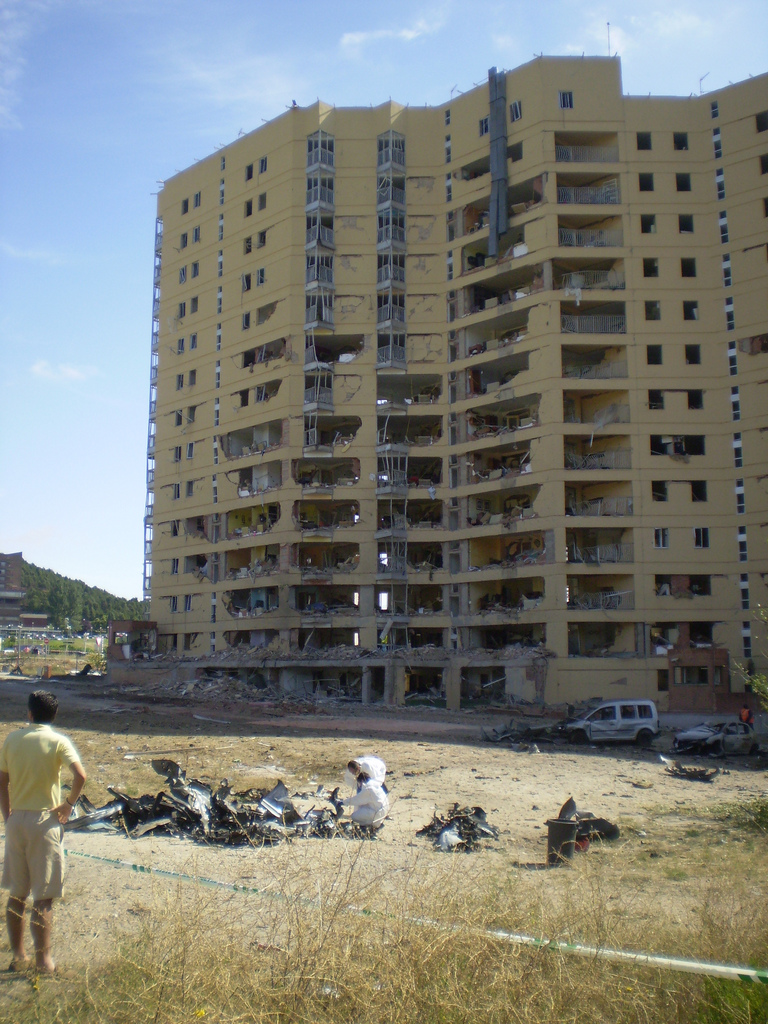
- The Civil Guard Barracks in Burgos after the attack.
- Location: Burgos, Spain
- Date: 29 July 2009; 4:30 – (UTC+2)
- Target: Civil Guard barracks
- Attack type: van bomb
- Deaths: 0
- Injuries: 65

A van bomb carrying more than 300 kg of explosive went off on 29 July 2009 outside a Civil Guard barracks in the northern city of Burgos, Spain, injuring at least 65 people. The attack was blamed on Basque separatist group Euskadi Ta Askatasuna (ETA). Several children were among the 65 wounded in the attack.

Some days before the attack, Spanish police warned that the organization might be trying a series of van bomb attacks after they found information of three vans being carried to Spain in a document seized from arrested members Asier Borrero, Itziar Plaza and Iurgi Garitagoitia a few weeks before the attack.

== Occurrence ==
About 120 people, one-third of them children, were sleeping in the building when the bomb went off at around 4:00 am local time (0200 UTC), blowing off most of its facade. The blast also left a two-metre (six-foot) deep crater in the street outside the barracks and heavily damaged the 14 storey residential complex and other buildings in the area.

== Aftermath ==
The day after the bombing, a car bomb explosion on the island of Majorca killed two civil guards, Carlos Sáenz de Tejada García, 28, and Diego Salva Lezaun, 26. The two attacks came few hours before the 50th anniversary of the foundation of the organization.
