= Terrorist incidents in Pakistan in 2001 =

In 2001, 2 terrorist attacks in Pakistan resulted in over 20 deaths. This was the beginning of the war on terror after the 9/11 attacks

- 28 October — Attack on a Protestant church in southern Punjab city of Bahawalpur resulted in 18 deaths and 6 injuries. With the exception of one police officer, all the fatalities were Christian worshippers .
- 21 December — Pakistani interior minister Lt. Gen. (retd) Moinuddin Haider's elder brother Ehteshamuddin Haider was shot dead by assailants near Soldier Bazaar in Karachi.
