= Terrorist incidents in Pakistan in 1996 =

== January ==
- 15 January: Poet Mohsin Naqvi is assassinated in Moon Market, Lahore.

== April ==
- April 15 — 6 people were killed in bombing in chemotherapy ward clinic's waiting room of then newly built Shaukat Khanum Memorial Cancer Hospital & Research Centre in Lahore, Punjab. The centre had been planned by cricketer Imran Khan. A day earlier, Khan had announced to form a new political party against the two existing parties headed by Benazir Bhutto and Nawaz Sharif. Khan told reporters, "It was meant to frighten us but we will fight on. This kind of action cannot stop us from threatening to our military and judicial ."
- April 28 — Bhai Pheru bus bombing: 50 people were killed and 26 injured by a bomb in the fuel tank of a bus in Bhai Pheru, Kasur District, Punjab. Most of the passengers were heading home for celebrating Eid al-Adha.

== July ==
- July 22 — A briefcase bomb killed 9 and wounded 20 people in the old terminal of Lahore International Airport. This was the 13th bomb of the year and Prime Minister Benazir Bhutto blamed India for orchestrating the bombings.

== September ==
- 18 September — Two bombs exploded in Karachi, Sindh, killing 1 person and injuring several. Police initially blamed supporters of Murtaza Bhutto, the estranged brother of sacked PM Benazir. Two days later, Murtaza denied the charges and in a few hours, he was killed in a shootout with police.

== December ==
- 3 December — 12 people were injured by a bomb explosion in Lahore outside a busy shopping centre. The explosion occurred during a visit by then Chinese President Jiang Zemin who was staying in a state guest house along with his counterpart President Farooq Laghari. The commissioner of Lahore, Salman Siddiqui, said that the act appeared to be of R&AW agents.
- 3 December — 17 people are injured by a bomb blast in Karachi. The bomb was placed outside a branch of the National Bank of Pakistan on the ground floor of PIDC building. The bomb also shattered the windows of two nearby hotels, namely Pearl Continental and Karachi Sheraton.
