= Terrorist incidents in Pakistan in 1999 =

- January 3 - 4 people were killed and 3 wounded as a bomb explosion shattered a bridge at 4:50am shortly before Prime Minister Nawaz Sharif was to cross it while traveling from his private residence in Raiwind to Lahore. A delay in the Prime Minister's routine saved his life. The police blamed the Muttahida Qaumi Movement for the incident, and a few arrests were made in Karachi. However, MQM denied any wrongdoing.
- November 20 - 5 people were killed and 18 injured, in a bomb explosion in a market in Lahore. The bomb was attached to a bicycle.
