= 2009 International Islamic University bombing =

Terrorist attack in Pakistan

- Location: 33°39′29.7″N 73°01′51.2″E; Islamabad, Pakistan
- Date: 20 October 2009; 14:10 – 14:15 (PST+5)
- Target: International Islamic University
- Attack type: Suicide school bombing,
- Deaths: 6 (excluding 2 suicide bombers)
- Injuries: 29

On 20 October 2009, at least six people, including three women, were killed, and as many as 29 people injured, 25 of them women, in twin suicide attacks at International Islamic University in the Pakistani capital Islamabad. Police said that the blasts at the university were caused by suicide bombers. This was the first-ever attack on students in the country since the start of 21st century terrorism in Pakistan in 2001.

== Background ==
The university is located in Islamabad's sector H-10. Eyewitnesses told Dawn News that there were between 3–4,000 students present in the campus at the time of the blast. The blasts took place at both the boys and girls campuses of the university.

The attack came as the Pakistani Army continued its offensive against militants in South Waziristan, in the country's north-west.

A string of attacks rocked Peshawar, Swat, Rawalpindi, Lahore, and Islamabad dating back to 5 October 2009, killing more than 250 people. The bombings made October one of the bloodiest months since the beginning of the terrorist attacks.

== Attacks ==
The first attack occurred adjacent to the cafeteria near the girls' hostel, while the second attack occurred in the Sharia and Law Department a few minutes later.

Deputy Commissioner Islamabad Amer Ali Ahmad told news reporters that the deceased were identified as Sidra Khalid (student), Hina (student), Pervaiz Masih (sanitary worker), Shaukat Bhatti (security guard), Amna (worker) and Khalil-ur-Rehman (student). Students said Masih, prevented the bomber from entering the cafeteria of the girls school and saved many lives.

No one has claimed responsibility for the attack.

== Domestic reactions ==
Interior Minister Rehman Malik said, "These people have attacked Islamic University which proves their NO affiliation with Islam. They are neither sincere with Islam nor Pakistan's friends."

Rehman Malik after a meeting on the security of schools and universities said, 'We have solid evidence that not only in Balochistan but India is involved in almost every terrorist activity in Pakistan.'

== Aftermath ==
The attacks prompted authorities to close schools and colleges throughout the country. The Sindh Education Department announced the closure of all government and private schools in the province until 25 October (Sunday), adding that universities would remain closed on 21 October (Wednesday) only. The NWFP and Balochistan governments also announced the closure of all education institutions until Sunday. Educational institutions in the federal capital had already been shut down until 25 October. In Punjab, it was reported on a private TV channel that all government and private education institutions would remain closed until further orders.

== See also ==
- Terrorism in Pakistan
- List of terrorist incidents in Pakistan since 2001
