= Elite Police Training School =

Coordinates: 31.4420°N 74.4649°E

Elite Police Training School, Bedian Road, Lahore is a police training school for the Punjab Elite Police located on Bedian Road in Lahore, Pakistan.

The Elite Police is a specialized unit of Punjab Police, which is extensively trained to support district police in high-risk operations such as searches, raids, and rescues. It plays SWAT role in the aid of district police personnel. Its officers undergo rigorous training in firearms proficiency, close combat tactics, and reconnaissance at the state-of-the-art Elite Training School located on Bedian Road in Lahore. An officer of the Deputy Inspector-General of Police (DIG) rank leads Elite Police.

On 15 October 2009, the training institute was attacked by four terrorists using guns and grenades. Two policemen were killed, including Jafar Hussain, an Assistant Sub-Inspector who led the fight against the terrorists, all of whom were killed.
