= Terrorist incidents in Pakistan in 1987 =

234 people were killed and 1200 wounded from 127 Afghan-inspired attacks in Pakistan in 1987. Overall, the country was the target of half of the state-sponsored attacks worldwide. Below is the timeline of a few main attacks.

- July 14 — 1987 Karachi car bombing

75 people were killed and more than 300 injured in two car bomb explosions and two other small bombs in Karachi's Saddar market. President Muhammad Zia-ul-Haq alluded to Afghan agents behind the bombings and sought international support to fight terror. He also said that the bombings were aimed at Pakistan to change its Afghan policy vis-à-vis Soviet intervention. Later, on September 19, 1987, Interior Minister Raja Nadir Pervez said that 60 Afghans were arrested from North Western Frontier Province in connection with the bombings and they were sent by Afghan secret police for subversive activities.

- September 16 — 12 people were killed and 33 injured by a car bomb in Peshawar.
- September 20 — At least 5 people were killed and 16 injured when a bomb exploded in a bus station in Rawalpindi. Prime Minister Mohammad Khan Junejo who was on a visit to the United Nations in New York told the reporters that this would not dampen the spirit of the people of Pakistan but raise it. This was the fourth blast in 10 days.
