= Terrorist incidents in Pakistan in 2003 =

There are only a few terrorist attacks in Pakistan, resulting over 50 deaths.

== February – March ==
- 28 February:- Two policemen were shot dead outside the United States consulate in Karachi, the same place where 12 people were killed by a car bomb nine months ago.
- 10 March:- Two people were injured when a masked terrorist opened indiscriminate fire on a mosque in Gulistan Colony, Faisalabad.

== June – July ==
- 8 June:- 11 Pakistani police trainees were shot dead in what is believed to have been a sectarian attack on Sariab Road, Quetta, as they all belonged to Hazara Shi'a branch of Islam. Another nine were reported wounded.
- 4 July:- At least 47 people were killed and 150 injured in an attack on a Shia mosque in the south-western Pakistani city of Quetta.

== October – December ==
- 3 October:- Six employees of Space and Upper Atmosphere Research Commission (SUPARCO) were killed and several others injured when their official van was fired upon on Hub River Road in Mauripur, Karachi. A Lashkar-e-Jhangvi cadre was officially charged.
- 6 October:- Maulana Azam Tariq, chief of the Millat-i-Islamia (formerly Sipah-e-Sahaba Pakistan) and MNA, was assassinated by unidentified gunmen along with four others as his car drove into the capital, Islamabad.
- 14 December:- President Pervez Musharraf survived an assassination attempt when a powerful bomb went off minutes after his highly guarded convoy crossed a bridge in Rawalpindi. Musharraf was apparently saved by a jamming device in his limousine that prevented the remote controlled explosives from blowing up the bridge as his convoy passed over it.
- 25 December:- Another attempt was carried on the president 11 days later when two suicide bombers tried to assassinate Musharraf, but their car bombs failed to kill the president; 16 others nearby died instead. Musharraf escaped with only a cracked windscreen on his car. Militant Amjad Farooqi was apparently suspected as being the mastermind behind these attempts, and was killed by Pakistani forces in 2004 after an extensive manhunt.
