= Terrorist incidents in Pakistan in 2000 =

- 17 January — At least 7 people killed when a bomb exploded in Karachi.
- 28 January— At least 4 people killed during two separate bomb blasts exploded in Karachi
- 5 February — At least 5 people killed in a bomb attack in a train in Hyderabad.
- 17 July — At least 10 people killed in a bomb attack in a train in Hyderabad
