= List of militants fatality reports in Pakistan =

The militants fatality reports are the official reports and battle logs gathered and published by the Ministry of Defence on the accounts of the rate of human casualties suffered by the Taliban in the frontier war since 2005. Reports are based on the official ISPR accounts and news media sources in Khyber Pakhtunkhwa and FATA.

This article incorporates yearly numbers of militant fatalities. Details on the numbers of killed in some major battles and operations are also provided.

== Totals ==
At least 28,907 militants (total casualties: 43,346+) have been reportedly killed so far (from January 2005 to present). This figure was updated, adding those counted by the South Asia Terrorism Portal but only concerning FATA and Khyber Pakhtunkhwa and not the whole regions of the country.

Taliban fatality reports in Pakistan by year
Year	Fatalities	Detail
2020		
2019	13	Monthly deaths by region can be found here:.
2018	51	Monthly deaths by region can be found here:.
2017	267	Monthly deaths by region can be found here:.
2016	355	Total deaths by regions can be found here:.
2015	1,717+	Total deaths by regions can be found here:. ~1,836 militants were killed in Operation Zarb-e-Azb.
2014	2,613	Total deaths by regions can be found here:. 2,168 militants were killed in Operation Zarb-e-Azb. 40 militants were killed by the Pakistani military in crackdowns, after Tehrik-i-Taliban carried out a terrorist attack on civilian targets at a school.
2013	1,360	Total deaths by regions can be found here:.
2012	2,241	Total deaths by regions can be found here:. Monthly totals can be found here: Year-end report can be found here:
2011	2,677	Total deaths by regions can be found here:. Monthly totals can be found here: Note: excludes drone casualties listed in source.
2010	5,028	This link is to the totals killed in Orakzai:
2009	8,049	Around 2,250 of these were killed in Operation Black Thunderstorm (1,475), the Khyber Pass offensive (151), and Operation Rah-e-Nijat (619).
2008	2,787	1,500 of these were killed in Operation Sherdil.
2007	1,386	Almost 610 of these were killed in Operation Sunrise, the Battle of Mir Ali, and Operation Rah-e-Haq.
2006	364	
2005	2+	
