= 2009 Usterzai bombing =

Suicide car bombing in Pakistan

On 18 September 2009, a suicide car bombing killed at least 39 people in Usterzai, Pakistan.

At 11am on 18 September 2009, a suicide car bombing took place at Kacha Pakha bazaar village market at a busy intersection, badly damaging Hikmat Ali hotel, as well as a restaurant and shops, causing some to collapse. It happened in a Shia Muslim area of Usterzai, North-West Frontier Province, Pakistan, five and a half years after the war in northwest Pakistan began. The attack killed at least 39 people and injured another 54, most of whom are believed to have been members of Pakistan's Shia minority, who are often targeted by Sunni extremist militants.

A group calling itself Lahskar-e-Jhangvi al-Almi claimed carrying out the attack, for what it called revenge for the killing of a cleric, Maulana M Amin, in Hangu, NWFP, three months earlier. They were believed to be linked to Taliban-linked Sunni supremacist group Lashkar-e-Jhangvi.
