= Terrorist incidents in Pakistan in 1997 =

== February ==
- February 28 — In two separate incidents, 5 people were killed and 2 wounded in Lahore. 3 people were killed and 11 injured by a bomb explosion outside Lahore Railway Station in a minibus station. Another 2 people were killed and 2 injured in a hit-and-run attack on people as they came out of a Sunni mosque after prayer. The mosque was on Lahore's main Shahrah-e-Quaid-e-Azam. Police told that attackers came on three motorcycles and the attacks appeared to be the result of Sunni-Shiite sectarian strife.

== November ==
- November 12 — Two unidentified gunmen kill four U.S. auditors from Union Texas Petroleum Corporation and their Pakistani driver near Sheraton Hotel in Karachi.
