= Terrorist incidents in Pakistan in 2004 =

This is a list of terrorist incidents in Pakistan in 2004.

== February - May ==
- 28 February:- An apparent suicide bomber was killed and three worshippers injured in an attack on Imambargah in Satellite Town, Rawalpindi, Punjab.
- 2 March:- At least 42 people were killed and more than 100 wounded when a procession of Shia Muslims was attacked by Deobandi extremists at Liaquat Bazaar in Quetta, Balochistan.
- 10 April:- At least one person was killed and three others were wounded when a bomb exploded in a parking area near a hall where hundreds of people were attending a concert by Indian singer Sonu Nigam.
- 3 May:- A car bomb in Gwadar, Balochistan killed three Chinese engineers and injured 10 other people.
- 7 May:- A suicide bomber attacked a crowded Shia mosque in Sindh Madrassatul Islam in Karachi, Sindh, killing at least 15 worshippers. More than 100 people were also injured, 25 of them critically in the attack. One person was killed in the riots that followed the attack.
- 14 May:- Six members of Shia family was shot dead in Mughalpura locality of Lahore, Punjab.
- 26 May:- Two car bombs explode within 20 minutes of each other outside the Pakistan-American Cultural Center and near the US consul general's residence in Karachi, killing two men and injuring more than 27 people, most of whom were policemen and journalists.
- 30 May:- A senior Deobandi religious scholar and head of Islamic religious school Jamia Binoria, Mufti Nizamuddin Shamzai, was shot dead in his car while leaving his home in Karachi.
- 31 May:- A suicide bomber blew up the Imambarghah Ali Raza mosque in Karachi in the middle of evening prayers, killing 16 worshippers and injuring 35 others. Two people were killed in riots over the mosque attack and Shamzai's assassination.

== June - August ==
- 10 June:- Gunmen opened fire on a convoy carrying the corps commander Lt Gen Ahsan Saleem Hyat in Karachi, killing 11 people. The corps commander who escaped unhurt later became the vice chief of army staff under General Pervez Musharraf. This was the first such attack on the Pakistan Army, not counting the earlier assassination attempts on General Pervez Musharraf who was also the President of the country, since the military began operations in Waziristan in 2004.
- 30 July:- Assassination attempt on the Prime Minister-elect Shaukat Aziz, while he was campaigning for by-election in Fateh Jang, Attock District, Punjab. Even though he survived the attempt, nine people were killed due to the suicide bombing.
- 2 August:- Chief Minister of Balochistan province Jam Mohammad Yousaf escaped an assassination bid when unidentified persons fired at his convoy killing one of his bodyguards and injuring two others.
- 8 August:- At least eight people were killed and over 40 others injured when two bombs exploded in quick succession near the Jamia Binoria madrasa, Karachi.
- 31 August:- Three people were killed and three others injured in a bombing at a shop in Kalat, Balochistan.

== September - December ==
- 21 September:- Suspected Sipah-e-Sahaba members gunned down at least three members of a Shi'a family in a sectarian attack in Dera Ismail Khan, Khyber Pakhtunkhwa.
- 1 October:- A suicide bombing left 25 people dead and dozen injured at a Shia mosque during Friday prayers in Sialkot, Punjab.
- 7 October:- A powerful car bomb left 40 people dead and wounded over 100 during a Deobandi rally to commemorate Maulana Azam Tariq, assassinated leader of Sipah-e-Sahaba Pakistan, in Multan, Punjab. This was most probably in retaliation to the Sialkot bombing six days earlier.
- 10 October:- An explosion by a suicide bomber at a mosque used by Shia Muslims in Lahore killed at least four people and injured another eight.
- 10 December:- At least 10 people were killed and 30 injured in a bombing at a market in Quetta. The bomb exploded near an Army truck, as Balochistan Liberation Army claimed responsibility.
