= Terrorist incidents in Pakistan in 1990 =

- May 7 — 21 people were killed and 30 injured in a train bombing near Lahore. State authorities said they had no suspect but local newspapers blamed the flurry of bombings in Lahore, Rawalpindi and Islamabad on Indian secret agents.
- May 18 — 10 people were killed and 54 wounded as a result of bomb blast near movie theater in Lahore.
- July 16 — 43 people were killed and 110 injured in 7 bomb explosions in Hyderabad, Sindh. The bombs were placed in markets, residential areas bus stops and a southbound train. Six of the explosions occurred within 10 minutes and the seventh one exploded an hour later. No one claimed responsibility but the police suspected Sindhi nationalists behind the bombings.
