= Operation Janbaz =

2009 Pakistani military operation

- Part of the Insurgency in Khyber Pakhtunkhwa
Date	10–11 October 2009
Location	Rawalpindi, Punjab Province, Pakistan
Result	Pakistani victory

Belligerents
Pakistan Army	(Afghanistan) Tehrik-i-Taliban, LeJ

Commanders and leaders
BGen Anwar-ul-Haq Ramday †; Lt.Col Waseem Amir †	(Afghanistan) Mohammed Aqeel (POW) (executed)

Units involved
Pakistan Army: 13th Regular Army Regiment; SSG Division	Unknown

Strength
Unknown (Possibly 50–100)	10 TTP militants

Casualties and losses
12 killed	9 killed 1 captured
- 2 civilian hostages killed

The Pakistan Army General Headquarters attack (Codename: Operation Janbaz; Urdu: فوجی آپریشن جانباز), was a hostage-rescue mission carried by SSG Division on 10 October 2009, when 10 gunmen in military uniform opened fire on the General Headquarters in Rawalpindi, Punjab, Pakistan. The attack killed nine soldiers, nine militants and two civilians and was a major escalation in Pakistan's domestic insurgency. One militant was wounded and captured by security forces. Soon after the attack, the militants infiltrated the security buildings where 22 civilian and military officials were held hostage by the militants. The Pakistan Army immediately launched a hostage rescue operation led by the SSG Division, Army Special Forces, and the 13th Regular Regiment.

== Background ==
The Pakistan Army and Pakistani officials have speculated that the attack could have been in retaliation for a series of planned operations in South Waziristan. A report published in The News International on 5 October, quoting Interior Department Punjab, had forewarned that militants wearing army uniforms would carry out an attack on GHQ. "If they fail to enter as per the first plan, then as an alternative they will drive the vehicle to the allegedly broken wall of the GHQ and jumped down into the compound using a ladder". The Daily Jang also reported on a possible threat.

== Initial attack ==
The attack began when 10 militants, wearing camouflaged army uniforms and armed with "sophisticated weapons", attacked a checkpoint at the army base. They arrived in a white van and attacked the compound with guns and hand grenades; at least three explosions were heard during the assault. During the attack, five militants and six soldiers were killed. The army dead included a brigadier and a lieutenant colonel. The attackers then took 42 hostages, said to include civilians and senior military personnel, to a location near the headquarters.

As the militants took over the security buildings, they took more than 42 people at gunpoint. The majority of them were civilian officials and unarmed military personnel. Due to prohibition of bearing weapons inside the GHQ Headquarters, the militants easily took control of the buildings. The Pakistan Army quickly planned the hostage rescue operation. After limited hours of preparation, the hostage operation was launched under the code name of Operation Janbaz. This was followed by deploying Pakistan Army Special Forces, 13th Regular regiment, and the SSG Division. The operation was led by the SSG Division's teams, while the Army Special Forces also participated in the operation. The Special Forces and SSG Division's teams stormed the buildings, and a heavy gun battle ensued. Well-armed Pakistani forces cleared the building in the first phase of the operation. The first 20 military personnel and civilian hostages were rescued by the Army Special Forces, and 3 injured militants were captured. After that, the remaining hostages were then rescued by the Pakistan army's Special Forces and the SSG Division. Among the hostages were 22 who were being guarded by a suicide bomber who failed to blow himself up and was subsequently killed. During the attack, which took place at 0600 hrs., four militants, two commandos, and three hostages (two civilians and one soldier) were killed. Three commandos later died of their injuries. One militant was captured; he was named as Mohammed Aqeel (alias Dr. Usman), and was said to be the leader of the group and the mastermind of the 3 March attack on the Sri Lankan cricket team. Aqeel was arrested in a building separate from the other militants, and five hostages were rescued from him. He had also tried to blow himself up and was injured in the process.

Photographs of two of the attackers were released to the general public for identification.

== Investigations ==
Police raided a house at Dhok Awan, Model Town Humak where the militants had stayed, and arrested the owner, Azam Qazi, as well as the real estate agent who rented the house to the attackers. Several sets of Pakistani Army uniforms, maps of sensitive locations, fuses and detonators used in explosives, material used in making suicide jackets, and identity cards were found at the safe house. Two pairs of trousers, two jeans, and over 10 pairs of Shalwar Kameez and slippers were also found. Evidence showed that at least 10 people were present at the house before the attack. The rent agreement was also found, which said the house was rented for Rs. 10,000 on 9 September. The attackers apparently stayed there for 20 to 25 days.

Police also arrested another alleged mastermind of the attacks, Qari Ishtiaq, who is said to be a commander of the Punjabi Tehrik-i-Taliban. He was arrested in Bahawalpur on information provided by Hijratullah, who had been sentenced to 10 years in prison for his role in the Lahore Police Academy attacks. Seven other militants were subsequently arrested from different parts of Punjab based on information obtained from him.

== Responsibility ==
A first information report (FIR) was registered at Royal Artillery Bazaar (R.A Bazaar) Police Station against Mohammad Aqeel, alias Dr. Usman, for the attack. FIR no. 674 was registered under the Anti-Terrorism Act (ATA). It alleged murder, attempted murder, and possession of explosives and illegal arms.

A Tehrik-e-Taliban (Amjad Farooqi Group) claimed responsibility for the attack in a phone call to an AFP reporter. The call was made by TTP spokesman Azam Tariq.

As long as Pakistan continues its operation against the Taliban, we will also keep continuing such attacks We claim responsibility for the attack on GHQ. It was carried out by our Punjab branch... We have the capability to strike at any place in Pakistan

Analysts have said the leader, Dr. Usman, is a member of the HUJI or the Lashkar-e-Jhangvi, acting in concert with the TTP.

According to ISPR, the attack was planned in South Waziristan, and 5 out of the 10 attackers belonged to Baitullah Meshud's group. According to Time, 5 of the 10 attackers were from Punjab. As such, the attack is believed to be one of the first major attacks attributed to the Punjabi Taliban, former state-supported militants now operating with the Taliban. Senior officials of the army were the prime target of the attacks. They were to be held hostage in order to secure the release of 100 already detained militants.

== Subsequent airstrikes ==
On the night of 11 October, Pakistan Air Force fighter jets struck several militant hideouts in South Waziristan, killing 13 Taliban fighters. Concurrently, Pakistani UAVs and surveillance aircraft conducted intermittent flights over various areas of North and South Waziristan.

== Media blackout ==
Geo News and Samaa TV, local news channels, were taken off the air for approximately one hour. A message from Pakistan’s media regulatory authority appeared on both channels, stating that the transmission of “independent news TV channels” was being temporarily suspended until further notice.

== 15 October attacks ==
On 15 October, further attacks were carried out against government buildings in various locations across Pakistan. Four gunmen attacked the Federal Investigation Agency building in Lahore; seven police officers and attackers were killed in the assault. Separately, two police academies and a police station in Kohat were also attacked.

== Reaction ==
- Pakistan Prime Minister Yousaf Raza Gillani strongly condemned the attack. Interior Minister Rehman Malik said in a statement, "We have been left no other option except to go ahead to face them". He called on all so-called terrorists to surrender and they "might expect leniency". He praised the "great expertise" of the Pakistani Army in dealing with the attack on GHQ. Police have increased security within the nearby Pakistani capital of Islamabad.
- United States Secretary of State Hillary Clinton said in London that she wished to "point out this shows the continuing threats to the Pakistani government and the very important steps that the civilian leadership, along with the military, are taking to root out the extremists and prevent violence and direct assaults on the sovereignty of the state".

== See also ==
- List of terrorist incidents in Pakistan since 2001
- War in North-West Pakistan
