= Wah (city) =

Wah Punjabi: واہ
- City
- Location within Punjab, Pakistan
- Coordinates: 33.783184°N 72.723076°E
- Country: Pakistan
- Province: Punjab
- Division: Rawalpindi Division
- District: Rawalpindi District
- Tehsil: Taxila Tehsil

Population (2019)
  - Total: 410,000
- Time zone: UTC+5 (PKT)
- Postal code: 47000
- Area code: 0514

Wah (Urdu/Punjabi: واہ) is a city in Rawalpindi District, Punjab, in Pakistan. It is famous for the Wah Cantonment, a military camp located in the north of the city. Wah includes a university known as the University of Wah and is close to its sister town of Taxila, located in the same tehsil.

== Wah Cantonment ==
The majority of the city includes the Wah Cantonment, a military camp in Punjab province located in the north of Punjab. The military camp is near Taxila Cantonment.

== History ==
A village without a name located in present-day Wah, was called "Wah" when Mughal emperor Jehangir came back from Kashmir and after he arrived in the village he said "Wah". Wah is also adjacent to Taxila, and shares much of its early history with the Gandhara Civilization. It is connected by road with Peshawar, Islamabad, and Rawalpindi and is a growing industrial centre. On August 21, 2008, Wah was attacked in a suicide bombing.

== Demographics ==
According to a census taken in 2019, the population of Wah, including the cantonment, is around 410,000. The population of the cantonment is a little above 300,000. Wah is the 24th largest city of Pakistan. The majority of the people speak Punjabi, while the main ethnic groups are Pashtun, Arain, Gujjar, and Awan.

== University ==
The University of Wah is a private university located outside the military camp. It is one of the best universities in Punjab.

== Education ==
Wah literacy rate is approximately 100% and highest literacy rate in Pakistan known as city of education. This small city has two chartered universities, one medical college, one engineering college and many other technical schools and colleges. Students from Wah Cantt can be found studying at many of the top institutes of Pakistan and abroad. Historically, many surrounding places show links of the area to its past as the neighboring ancient town of Taxila had been a seat of learning for thousands of years. The Prime Minister Shaukat Aziz said "Wah Cantt possessed ideal education and health facilities and I am impressed with the 100% literary rate in the city". It was also titled as "The Island of excellence" 120 educational institutes serve over 170,000 students.
