= Ahsan Khan (disambiguation) =

Ahsan Khan may refer to:

- Ahsan Khan (born 1981), Pakistani film and television actor
- Ahsan Azhar Hayat Khan (born 1952), Pakistani army officer and ambassador
- Ahsan Mohomed Khan (born 1916), Indian field hockey player

== See also ==
- Ehsan Khan (disambiguation)
