= Federal Government Educational Institutions =

Public-Sector Education Network of Pakistan

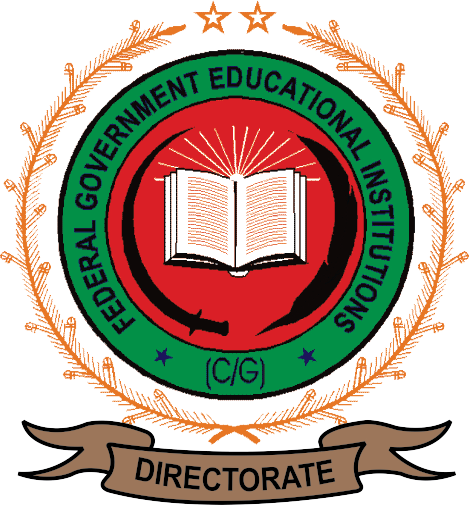
Federal Government Educational Institutions (Cantonments/Garrisons) Directorate
- Director General: Maj Gen Muhammad Atif Mansha, HI(M)
- Affiliations: Government of Pakistan
- Website: www.fgei.gov.pk

The Federal Government Educational Institutions (Cantonments/Garrisons) Directorate often abbreviated to FGEI (C/G) Dte is a directorate under the administrative structure of IGT&E Branch, GHQ Rawalpindi and an attached department of Ministry of Defence funded by the Government of Pakistan, that manages various schools, colleges and the National University of Pakistan.

== History ==
Established on June 1, 1975, it encompasses educational institutions across various Pakistani cities and towns. With the formation of this directorate, all employees of these institutions became Federal Government civil servants as per the Civil Servants Act of 1973.

In September 1977, the control and management of these institutions shifted to the General Headquarters (GHQ), placing the FGEI (C/G) Directorate under the umbrella of the Federal Ministry of Defence. The directorate works in tandem with the GHQ, Military Formations, and the Ministry of Defence (MoD). It receives budgetary allocations for employee salaries and the development of new institutions from the Ministry of Finance, mediated through the MoD.

The FGEI (C/G) Directorate falls within the structure of the IGT&E's Branch and is led by a Director General. In an effort to enhance administrative efficiency, three Brigadiers have been added to the structure, bringing the total to 12 subordinate Regional Offices. These offices are based in Peshawar, Wah, Rawalpindi, Chaklala, Kharian, Lahore, Multan, Bahawalpur, Gujranwala, Karachi, Fazaia, and Quetta. Offices in Bahawalpur, Chaklala, Gujranwala, and Fazaia are operational on an ad-hoc basis.

In 2011, the Government of Pakistan converted federal government colleges in Islamabad into model colleges.

== FGEI (C/G) ==
The primary mandate of the FGEI (C/G) Directorate is to provide quality education to the children of Pakistan Armed Forces personnel and civilian children living in cantonments. The directorate exerts administrative, academic, technical, and financial oversight over all its affiliated educational institutions, adhering to the policies of the Ministry of Defence/Establishment Division.

== Schools ==
=== Middle schools ===
- FG Public Middle School Peshawar
- FG Public Middle School No.3 Nowshera
- FG Model Public School (2nd Shift) Wah Cantt
- FG Public Middle School No.1 (2nd Shift) Wah Cantt
- FG Public Middle School No.2 (2nd Shift) Wah Cantt
- FG Public School No.3 (Boys) (2nd Shift) Wah Cantt
- FG Junior Public School No.8 (2nd Shift) Wah Cantt
- FG Public School No.4 (Boys) (2nd Shift) Wah Cantt
- FG Public Middle School No.12 Wah Cantt
- FG Junior Public School Gudwal Wah
- FG Public Middle School Chamanabad Rawalpindi
- FG Public Middle School (Boys) Daryabad Rawalpindi
- FG Public Middle School Dhoke Gujran Rawalpindi
- FG Public Middle School Sikandarabad Abbottabad
- FG Public Middle School BRC Abbottabad
- FG Public Middle School (Girls) Attock
- FG Public Middle School Wavel Lines Chaklala Rawalpindi
- FG Public Middle School Kharian
- FG Public Middle School No.3 (Girls) Lahore
- FG Public Middle School (2nd Shift) Walton Road Lahore
- FG Public Middle School Amer Sidhu Lahore
- FG Public Middle School (Girls) Mazhar Lines Lahore
- FG Public Middle School Chak 78 NB Sargodha
- FG Public Middle School Bahawalnagar
- FG Public Middle School (Girls) Shorkot
- FG Public Middle School (Girls) Multan
- FG Public Middle School COD Khanewal
- FG Public Middle School Model Colony Karachi
- FG Public Middle School (Girls) Drigh Road Karachi
- FG Public Middle School Shami Lines Hyderabad
- FG Public Middle School (OC) Malir Cantt Karachi
- FG Public Middle School (Girls) Malir
- FG Chiltan Public Middle School Quetta
- FG Jinnah Public Middle School Quetta

=== High schools ===
- FG Public School No.1 (Girls) RA Bazar Lahore
- FG Public School No.1 (Boys) Lahore
- FG Public School No.6 (girls) wahcantt
- FG Public School (Girls) No.4 Lahore
- FG Public School No.5 (Boys) Lahore
- FG Public School MS Garrison Lahore
- FG Model Public School (Girls) Sarwar Road Lahore
- FG Public Middle School (Boys) Shami Road Lahore
- FG Public School (Boys) Chunian
- FG Public School (Girls) Chunian
- FG Public School, Shorkot
- FG Public School No.1 City Road Shorkot Cantt
- FG Public School No.2 (Boys) Multan
- FG Public School No.3 (Girls) Multan
- FG Public School (Boys) Sher Shah Road Multan
- FG Public School (Girls) Sher Shah Road Multan
- FG SMHS (NH) Public School (Girls) Multan
- FG Public School No.2 (Boys) (2nd Shift) Multan
- FG Public School No.3 (Girls) (2nd Shift) Aurang Zeb Road Multan
- FG Public School Abdul Hakim
- FG Public School, Okara
- FG Public School No.1 (Boys) Okara
- FG Public School (Boys) Abbysinia Lines Karachi
- FG Public School Hyderabad
- FG Public School No.2 (Girls) Hyderabad
- FG Public School Malir
- FG Public School Manora
- FG Public School Pano Aqil
- FG Public School (Boys) Madrisa Road Quetta
- FG Public School (Girls) Aziz Bhatti Road Quetta
- FG Public School Khuzdar
- FG Public School Zhob
- FG Public School Sui
- FG Public School No.1 (Girls) Wah Cantt
- FG Public School No.6 (Girls) Wah Cantt
- FG Public School No.2 (Girls) Wah Cantt
- FG Public School No.3 (Girls) Wah Cantt
- FG Public School No.1 Boys Trust Colony Bahawalpur
- FG Public School Boys Bahawalpur Cantt
- FG Public School No.4 (Girls) Wah Cantt
- FG Public School No.7 (Girls) Wah Cantt
- FG Public School No.4 (Boys) Wah Cantt
- FG Public School No.5 (Boys) Wah Cantt
- FG Public School PAC Kamra
- FG Public School AMF Kamra
- FG Public School KARF Kamra
- FG Public School Taxila
- FG Public School No.1 (Girls) Taxila
- FG Public School Havelian
- FG Public School No.1 (Boys) Havelian
- FG Public School (Boys) Sanjwal
- FG Public School (Girls) Sanjwal
- FG Fazaia Public School PAF Base Kala Bagh Abbottabad
- FG Fazaia Public School PAF E-9 Islamabad
- FG Fazaia Public School PAF Nurkhan Base Chaklala Rawalpindi
- FG Fazaia Public School PAF Jinnah Camp Chaklala Rawalpindi
- FG Fazaia Public School PAF Base Lahore
- FG Fazaia Public School PAF Mushaf Base Sargodha
- FG Fazaia Public School PAF Rafiqui Base Shorkot
- FG Fazaia Public School PAF Base Sakesar
- FG Fazaia Public School PAF M.M. Alam Base Mianwali
- FG Fazaia Public School PAF Masroor Base Karachi
- FG Fazaia Public School PAF Faisal Base Karachi
- FG Fazaia Public School PAF Shaheen Camp Peshawar
- FG Fazaia Public School PAF Base Badaber Peshawar
- FG Higher Secondary School (Girls) COD Kala Jhelum
- FG Public School CMT & SD Golra Rawalpindi

== Colleges ==
- FG Degree College for Men, Peshawar Cantt
- FG Degree College for Women, Peshawar Cantt
- FG Degree College for Boys, Nowshera Cantt
- FG Girls Degree College, Nowshera Cantt
- FG Degree College for Women, Kohat Cantt
- FG Degree College for Boys, Kohat Cantt
- FG Degree College for Women, Banu Cantt
- FG Postgraduate College for Women Kashmir Road, Rawalpindi.
- FG Liaquat Ali Degree College Peshawar Road, Rawalpindi.
- FG Degree College for Women Abid Majeed Road, Rawalpindi Cantt
- FG Sir Syed College, Rawalpindi Cantt.
- FG Quaid-e-Azam Degree College Chaklala-III, Rawalpindi Cantt
- FG Degree College, Attock Cantt
- FG Postgraduate College for Women, Wah Cantt.
- FG Degree College for Men, Wah Cantt.
- FG Science Degree College for Men, Wah Cantt.
- FG Degree College PAC, Kamra Cantt.
- FG Degree College for Men, Kharian Cantt
- FG Degree College for Women, Kharian Cantt
- FG Degree College, Lahore Cantt
- FG Degree College, Gujranwala Cantt
- FG Degree College for Women, Multan Cantt.
- FG Degree College for Boys, Multan Cantt.
- FG Degree College, Okara Cantt
- FG Degree College, Hyderabad Cantt
- FG Boys Degree College, Quetta Cantt
- FG Girls Degree College, Quetta Cantt
- FG Inter College, Batkhela
- FG Boys Inter College, Mardan Cantt
- FG Girls Inter College, Mardan Cantt
- FG Girls Inter College, Abbottabad
- FG Inter College, Kotli (AK)
- FG Inter College, Jhelum Cantt
- FG Inter College, Mangla Cantt
- FG Inter College, Sialkot
- FG Inter College, Bahawalpur Cantt
- FG Girls Inter College, Karachi Cantt
- FG Boys Inter College, Karachi Cantt
