= UOW =

UOW are the initials of the following universities:

- University of Wah, Pakistan
- University of Wales, United Kingdom
- University of Warwick, United Kingdom
- University of Westminster, United Kingdom
- University of Winchester, United Kingdom
- University of Wollongong, Australia
- University of Wolverhampton, United Kingdom
