= Wah railway station =

Railway station in Punjab, Pakistan

Wah Railway Station واہ ریلوے اسٹیشن
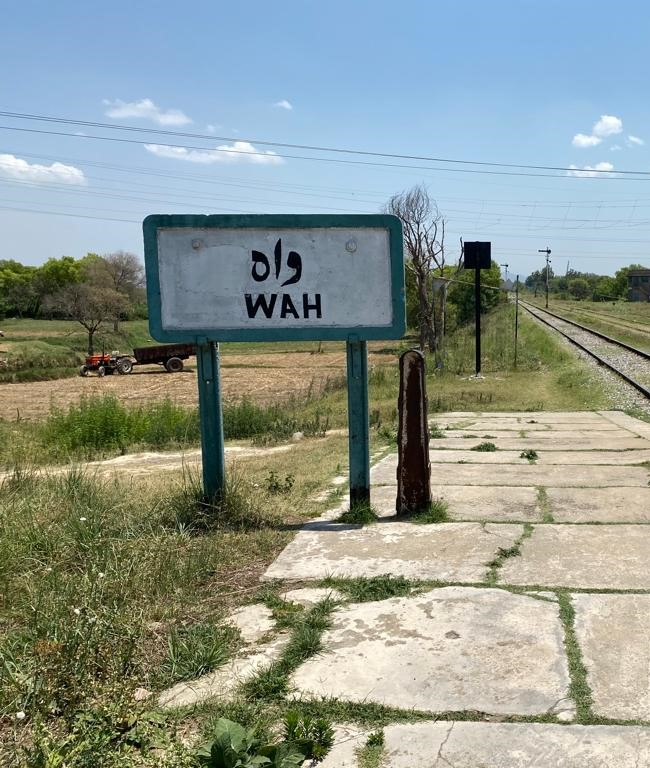

General information
- Coordinates: 33.8175°N 72.7373°E
- Owner: Ministry of Railways
- Line: Karachi–Peshawar Railway Line

Other information
- Station code: WAH

History
- Opened: 1909

Services
Preceding station	Pakistan Railways	Following station
Budho towards Kiamari	Karachi–Peshawar Line	Hasan Abdal towards Peshawar Cantonment
Location

Wah Railway Station (Urdu and Punjabi: واہ ریلوے اسٹیشن) is located in Wah town, Rawalpindi district, Punjab, Pakistan. It is around 48 km away from the Rawalpindi city and is the last railway station of Pakistan railways in Rawalpindi division.

== See also ==
- Wah Cantonment railway station
- List of railway stations in Pakistan
- Pakistan Railways
