= Ehsan Khan =

Ehsan Khan may refer to:

- Ehsan Khan (architect), Bangladesh
- Ehsan Khan (cricketer), Hong Kong
- Ehsan Khan, a fictional character portrayed by Saif Ali Khan in the 2009 Indian film Kurbaan

== See also ==
- Ahsan Khan (disambiguation)
