= Wah Cantonment railway station =

Railway station in Punjab, Pakistan

Wah Cantonment Station واہ کینٹ ریلوے اسٹیشن

General information
- Coordinates: 33.75817°N 72.79295°E
- Owner: Ministry of Railways

Other information
- Station code: WHC

Services
Preceding station	Pakistan Railways	Following station
Taxila Cantonment towards Kiamari	Karachi–Peshawar Line	Budho towards Peshawar Cantonment
Location

Wah Cantonment Railway Station (Urdu and Punjabi: واہ کینٹ ریلوے اسٹیشن) is located in Wah cantonment area near Wah town, Rawalpindi district of Punjab province of the Pakistan.

== History ==
Wah Cantt Railway Station, established in the late 19th century during British colonial rule, was primarily built to support the nearby Wah Ordinance Factory, which began operations in 1913. This station played a pivotal role in transporting military supplies and materials, especially during the World Wars. Today, Wah Cantt Railway Station continues to serve as a key transportation hub in the region.

== See also ==
- List of railway stations in Pakistan
- Pakistan Railways
