= Ahsan Azhar Hayat Khan =

Pakistani general (born 1952)

Lieutenant General Ahsan Azhar Hayat Khan HI(M)
- Born: 1952 (age 73–74)
- Education: Pakistan Command & Staff College; National Defence University, Pakistan
- Spouse: Shafqat Ahsan
- Military career
- Allegiance: Pakistan
- Branch: Pakistan Army
- Service years: 1971–2010
- Rank: Lieutenant General
- Unit: Pakistan Army Armoured Corps
- Commands: IG Training & Evaluation; Commander V Corps; Commandant Pakistan Military Academy
- Conflicts: Operation Sirat-e-Mustaqeem; Siachen War; Indo-Pakistani War of 1999; Operation Rah-e-Haq; Operation Rah-e-Rast
- Awards: Hilal-e-Imtiaz (Military)
- Other work: Pakistan Ambassador to Jordan

Ahsan Azhar Hayat Khan is a retired three-star rank Pakistan Army general.

== Early life ==
He was born in 1952 to a family belonging to the Khattar Tribe in Wah, Pakistan. He served as Pakistan's ambassador to Jordan. He was appointed in 2013 and served until 2015.

== Military career ==
Hayat had served as the GOC 25th Mechanised Division Malir Cantt, Commandant of the Pakistan Military Academy, IG Training & Evaluation and Commander V Corps.

He also attended Hamid Gul's and Guls wife's funeral.

== See also ==
- V Corps (Pakistan)
- Jordan-Pakistan relations
