= Wah Cantonment =

City in Punjab, Pakistan

Wah Cantonment: واہ چھاونی (Punjabi); واہ کینٹ (Urdu); Wah Cantt
- City
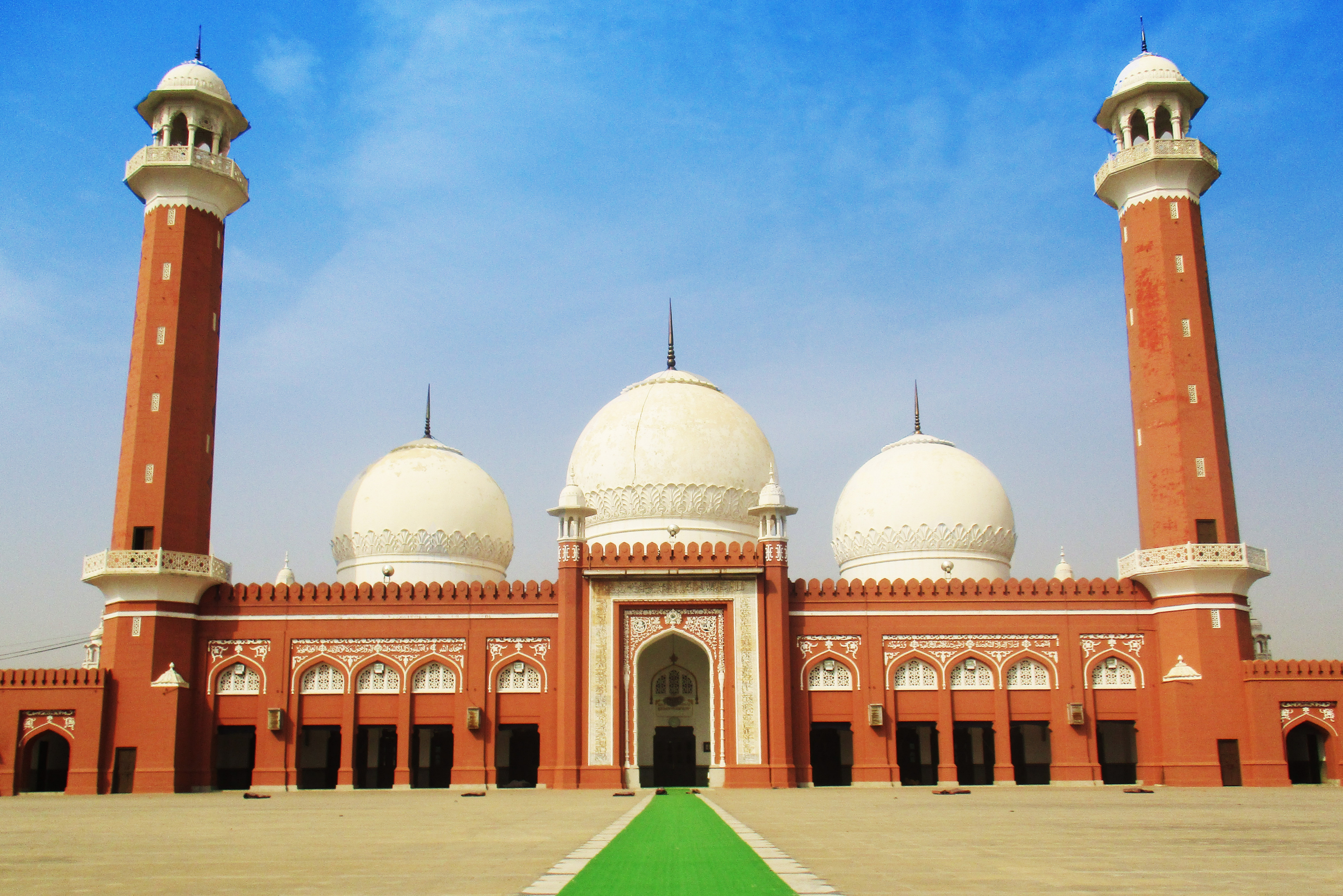
- Markazi Jamia Masjid

- Wah Cantonment Wah Cantonment (Pakistan)
- Coordinates: 33.7714°N 72.7518°E
- Country: Pakistan
- Province: (Punjab, Pakistan) Punjab
- District: Rawalpindi
- Tehsil: Taxila Tehsil
- Established: 1949

Area
  - City: 58.27 km^{2} (22.50 sq mi)
  - Land: 5,841 ha (14,433 acres)
- Elevation: 471 m (1,545 ft)

Population (2023)
  - City: 400,733
  - Rank: 24th, Pakistan
  - Density: 6,877/km^{2} (17,810/sq mi)
- Time zone: UTC+5 (PST)
- Postal code: 47040
- Area code: 0514
- Literacy rate: 99%

Wah Cantonment (Punjabi: واہ چھاونی; Urdu: واہ کینٹ) (also known as Wah Cantt) is a city in Punjab, Pakistan. It is the 17th most populous city in Punjab and 24th most populous city in Pakistan with a population of 400,733 people according to the 2023 census.

It is located on the historic Grand Trunk Road. Wah Cantt has constantly maintained the highest literacy rates in Pakistan, exceeding 78%. It spans over 5,841 ha (14,433 acres).

It was termed as a "Model Education City" by Shaukat Aziz, Prime Minister of Pakistan. The city is located on the Potohar Plateau, and is located 30 km (19 mi) northwest of the Islamabad-Rawalpindi Metropolitan Area.

== Toponymy ==
Previously known as Jalal Sar, Mughal Emperor Jahangir coined the term 'Wah' which translates to 'Wow' (Urdu: واہ). In his biography, Tuzk-e-Jahangiri, Mughal Emperor Jahangir recounts while returning from an expedition on 29 April 1607 he visited the natural springs at Mughal Gardens Wah and uttered the words 'Wah' as admiration. Subsequently, people began referring to the area as 'Wah'. Jahangir wrote the following in Tuzk-e-Jahangiri.

On Wednesday the 12th (of 1607) the camp was at Bābā Ḥasan Abdāl. One kos (Approx. 3.2 km) to the east of this station there is a waterfall over which the stream rushes with great force. There is no fall like it on the way to Kabul. On the road to Kashmir there are two or three like it. In the middle of the basin, in which is the source of the stream, Rāja Mān Singh has erected a small building. There are many fish in the basin of the length of a quarter guz (Approx. 9 Inches). I halted three days at this enchanting place, drinking wine with those who were intimate with me and employing myself in catching fish. Until now I had never thrown a sufra net, which is a famous kind of net, and which in Hindi they call bhanwar jāl. It is not easy to throw. I threw it with my own hand and caught twelve fish, and putting pearls into their noses, let them loose in the water.

The word 'Cantonment' (often shortened as 'Cantt') was added in December 1951 when Pakistan's Second Prime Minister, Khawaja Nazimuddin, inaugurated four ordnance workshops.

== History ==
Wah Cantonment is situated along the historic Grand Trunk Road, one of the oldest trade corridor in South-Asia dating back to 2500 years that connected the Central Asia to South Asia.

The region surrounding Wah has been a cradle of history for millennia, lying close to the heartland of the Gandhara Civilisation, famed for its Buddhist art, culture, and scholarship between the 1st millennium BCE and the early centuries CE. Archaeological remains, stupas, and relics from Gandhara still exist in the wider Taxila–Wah area.

=== Mughal Rule ===
The Mughal invasion of this area had a significant impact on the architecture of the village and surrounding areas which is visible in historic landmarks such as Mughal Gardens Wah colliqually known as Wah Gardens. These Gardens have hosted multiple mughal emperors and other notable mughal figures such as Raja Man Singh, Jahangir (1607), Shah Jahan (1639, 1646, 1647, 1649, 1654) and Aurangzeb (1676).

=== British Rule ===
In 1849, as the aftermath of the Sikh Empire's defeat in the Second Anglo-Sikh war, the region was brought under British rule.

During this time, Pakistan's Oldest Cement Manufacturing Plant known as the Associate Cement Company (ACC), later renamed as ACC Wah Portland Cement Company Ltd, was also established in Wah in 1921. At the time of Partition, it was one of four cement plants in Pakistan. Sir Sikandar Hayat, former Premier of Punjab, also served on the board of this company. This cement plant was designed by FLSmidth & Co.

=== Pre-partition Refugee Camp ===
As a result of the Rawalpindi Massacres of March 1947, multiple Sikhs & Hindus were left homeless and destitute. A refugee camp was set up at Wah Cantonment for these groups. Plausibly at the Wah Cement Company Ltd Plant (erstwhile Associated Cement Company) that was established in 1921. Historical accounts suggest that up to 12,000 refugees were hosted at Wah Cantonment.

=== Post-partition Developments ===
Initially, under public-sector housing, sponsored by Government of Pakistan, two markets were created which were circular in design, containing a park in the middle surrounded by shops within the townships. These markets were as follows.

==== Anwar Chowk ====
This market was named after Sheikh Anwarul Haq, who was serving as the Joint Secretary of Ministry of Defense at that time, thereafter he become the 9th Chief Justice of Supereme Court of Pakistan.

==== Laiq Ali Chowk ====
This market was named after the Nawab of Hyderabad, Mir Laiq Ali Khan, who had helped Government of Pakistan financially post-partition.

After having completed these two markets, in early 1960s, in light of the view that no major market exists on Quaid Avenue and these two markets were far away from principal road of the city. A third market was also commissioned.

==== Aslam Market ====
Realizing this gap, the then Chairman, Umrao Khan, approached a affluent contractor named Aslam Khan. The contractor was requested to build 10 additional shops on Quaid-Aveneue erstwhile Mall Road free of cost and in return the market would be named "Aslam Market" in recognition of his service. Aslam Khan built these shops free of cost and transferred them to Cantonment Board Wah free of cost and as agreed the market was renamed in his honour.

The same chairman, Umrao Khan, thereafter opined that no industry can employee 100% of ther employees within Public Housing. In recognition of this a housing scheme was launched to introduce private housing to Wah Cantonment.

==== Lalrukh (Erstwhile Basti & Basti Karegar) ====
There was an aerodome in this area from the colonial era. However, this aerodrome was defunct due to the sensitivity of the nearby facilities. Accordingly, around 40.5 hectares of this aerodrome were converted into private housing scheme under the name "Basti Karegar". Karegar in urdu means a worker. As this society was for workers hence karegar was added. However the "Karegar" word went out of vogue. Thereafter, the masses started referring to it as "Basti". The plan for this was drafted by Umrao Khan which presented it to President of Pakistan which approved it. According to the plan, employees would have to pay 10% of their salary towards completion of their house. Lately, the area was officially named as "Lalarukh", however, the name "Basti" is still in vogue.

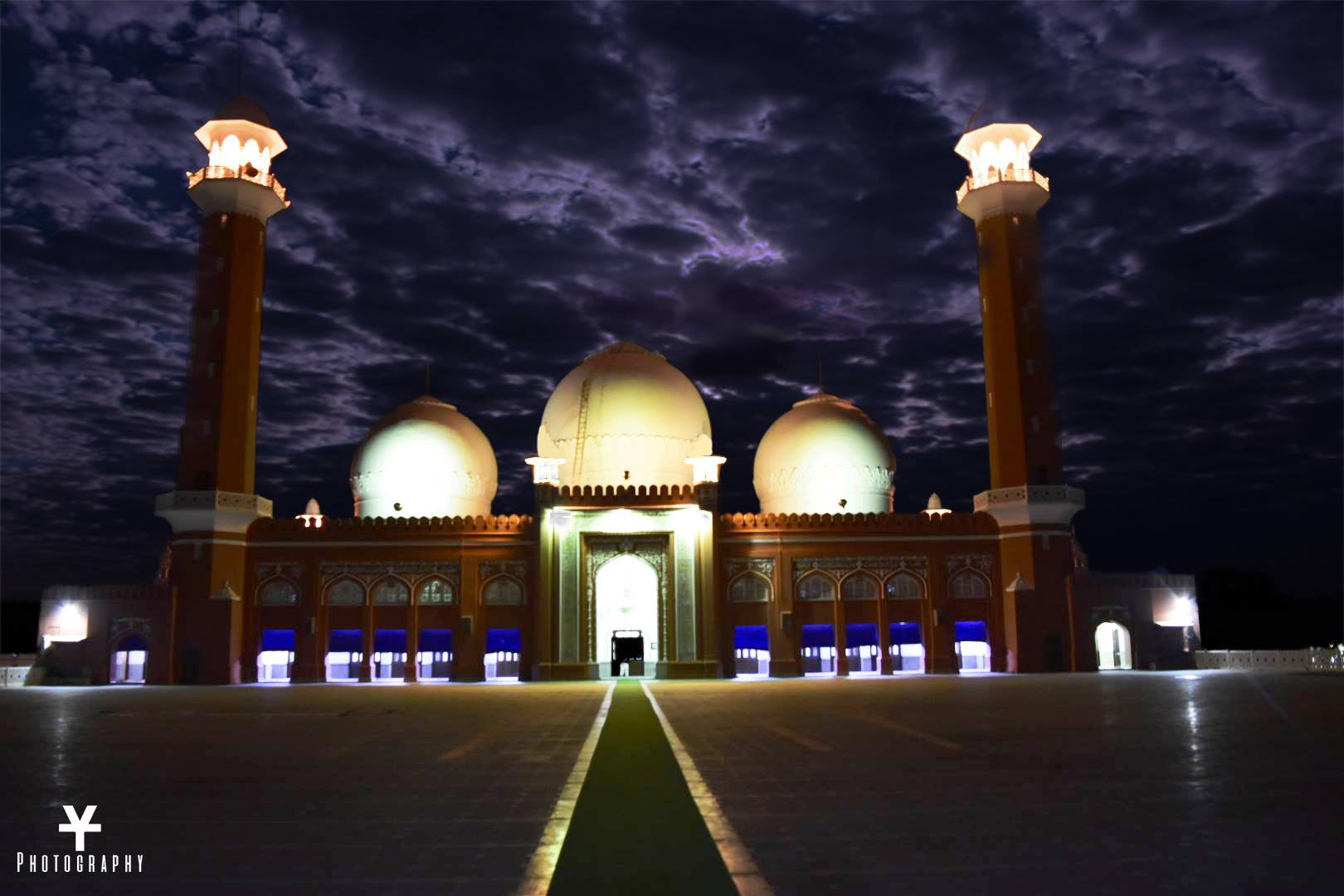
Jamia Masjid illuminated under a cloudy night sky

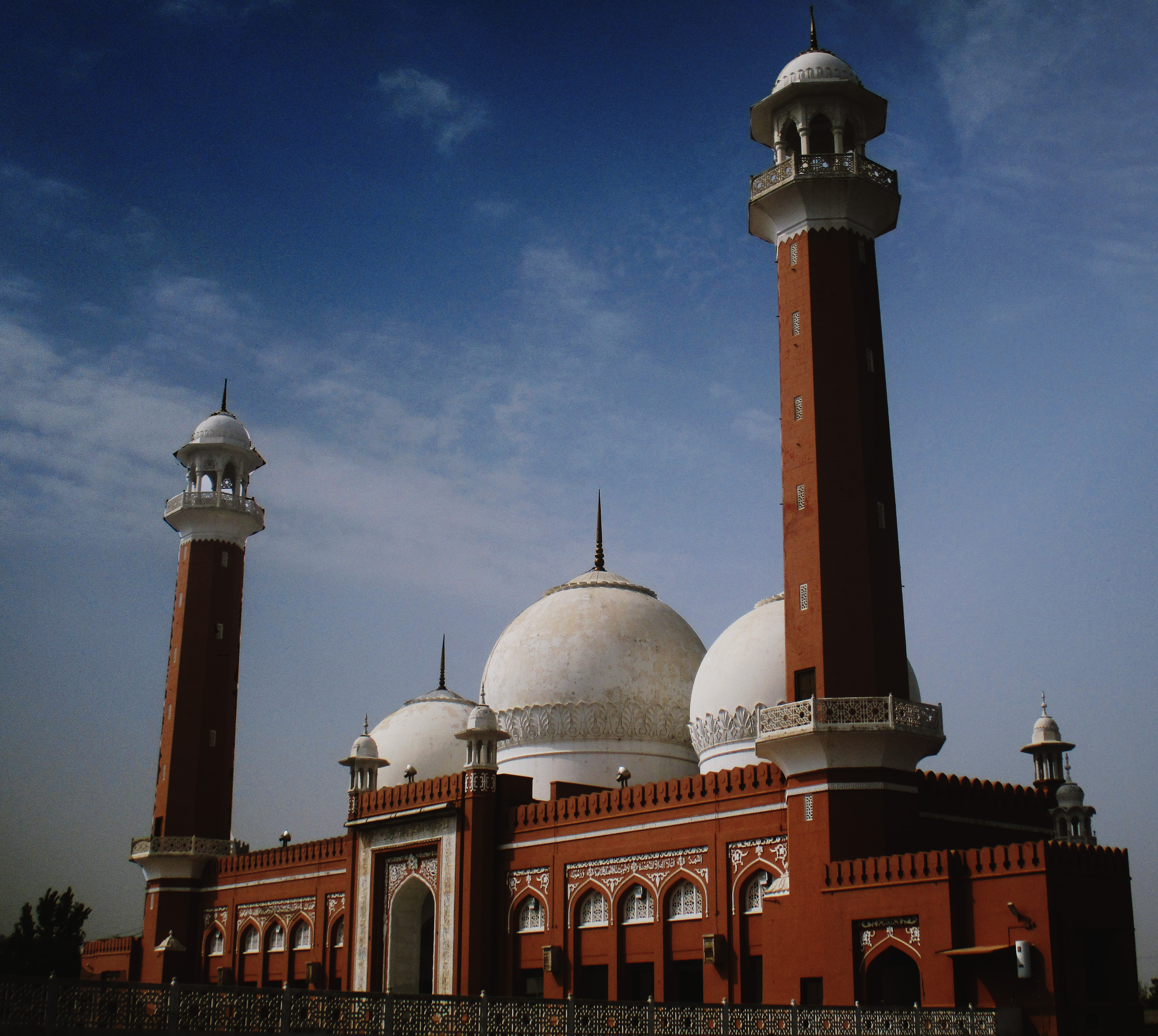
Jamia Mosque Wah Cantt

== Demographics ==
=== Population ===
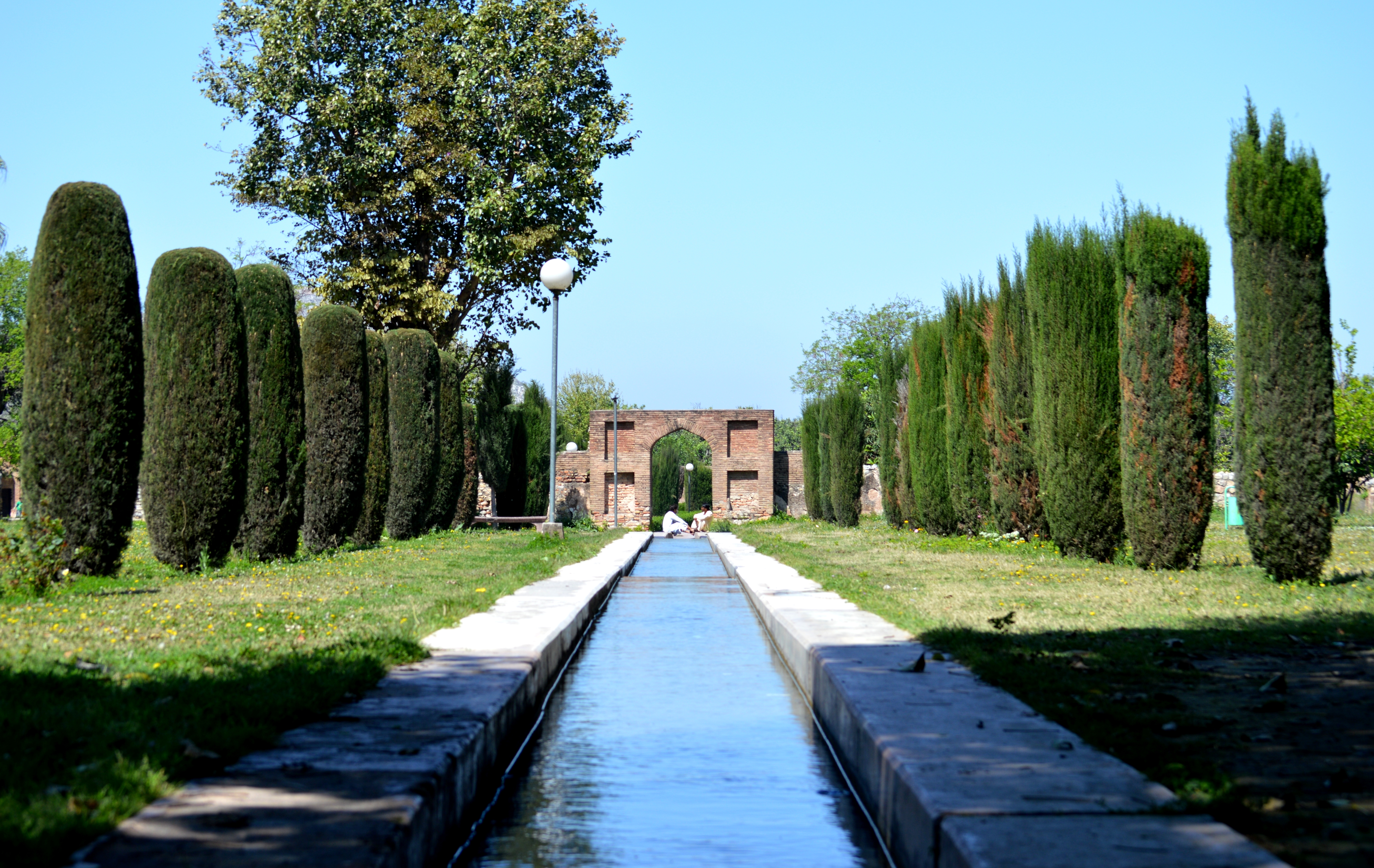
Wah Gardens in Wah Cantonment

Historical population

Year	Pop.	±% p.a.
1951	32,823	—
1961	37,035	+1.21%
1972	107,510	+10.17%
1981	122,335	+1.45%

Year	Pop.	±% p.a.
1998	198,891	+2.90%
2017	380,103	+3.47%
2023	400,733	+0.88%

According to 2023 census, Wah Cantonment had a population of 400,733.

=== Language ===
Urban Population of Taxila Tehsil
1. Punjabi (62.5%)
2. Urdu (15.4%)
3. Pashto (14.4%)
4. Hindko (3.70%)
5. Kashmiri (1.24%)
6. Saraiki (0.93%)
7. Others (1.81%)

In the 2023 census, 62.48% of the population identified their mother tongue as Punjabi, 15.39% as Urdu, 14.45% as Pashto, 3.70% as Hindko, 1.24% as Kashmiri, 0.93% as Saraiki 1.81% spoke other minor languages (mostly Sindhi and Balti). (Note: Language Statistics include Taxila city and Taxila Cantonment along with Wah Cantonment which forms 74.9% of their combined population.)

== Education ==
On an official visit on 10 January 2005, the then Prime Minister of Pakistan, Shaukat Aziz said Wah Cantonment possessed ideal education and health facilities and that he was impressed with the literacy rate of the city.

Owing to this prestigious distinction in the education sector, I declare Wah Cantt as model education city of the country - Shaukat Aziz

Wah Cantonment boasts one of the highest literacy rates in Pakistan, reportedly exceeding 99.99%. The city is home to a wide range of educational institutions, including universities, medical colleges, and technical institutes. Prominent establishments include the following:

- University of Wah
- COMSATS University, Wah
- Wah Medical College
- Wah Engineering College.
- Metallurgical Laboratory.

=== Central Library Wah ===
The library was inaugurated on 9 October 1984. The Central Library is a repository boasting books and periodicals in excess of 58,000 and is located on Quaid Avenue. The library also maintains 5 reading rooms throughout various parks in the city.

=== Federal Government Educational Institutions (FGEI C/G) ===
The Federal Government Educational Institutions Directorate (FGEI) maintains its second-largest regional education network in Wah Cantonment. Established in 1984, the Regional Office Wah oversees FGEI's institutions in Wah Cant. The region comprises 42 schools and 4 colleges serving a student population of over 33,000 with approximately 1,400 faculty members, making it one of the largest public-sector schooling networks in Pakistan. Prominent institutions of the FGEI network are as follows

==== F.G. Degree College for Men ====
The college was established as C.B. Intermediate College in 1964 and subsequently raised to the degree level in 1978. Its administrative control was entrusted to the Federal Ministry of Education after Nationalization of Educational Institutions in 1975. Since 1992 the institute is under the control of Directorate of FGEI.

==== Federal Government Public School No.1 (Boys) ====
The school was initially established under Cantonment Board as Junior Public School in 1952. Later, It was upgraded as Secondary Public School in 1958. Due to nationalization, in 1975, this school was taken over by Federal Ministry of Education. Finally, it was handed over to Directorate of FGEI.

In 1981 this Public School was bifurcated and augurated as Federal Government Public High School Wah Cantt and Federal Government Junior Public School Wah Cantt. The school was offering co-education since its inception. In the year 1999, a board was constituted at regional level to assess the feasibility of a separate Girl's High School. Consequently, the bifurcated Junior Public School portion was transformed into Federal Government Public School No. 6 (Girls), Wah Cantt.

== Landmarks ==
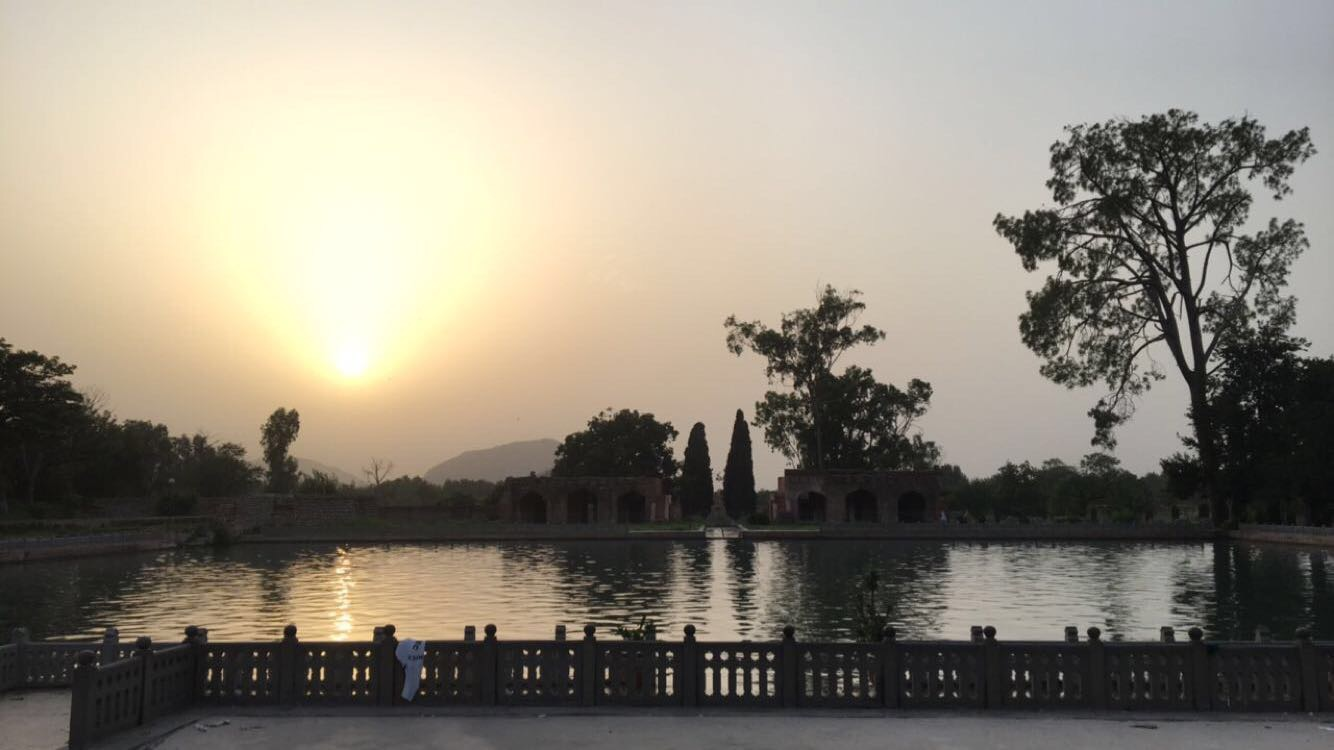
The main water reservoir at Wah Garden.

=== Mughal Gardens Wah ===
Wah Gardens (Urdu: واہ باغ), also known as Mughal Garden Wah (Urdu: مغل گارڈن واہ), is a garden-complex dating created by Raja Man Singh, brother-in-law and court chief of Emperor Jahangir. These gardens have hosted multiple Mughal Emperors including Jahangir (1607), Shah Jahan (1639, 1646, 1647, 1649, 1654) and Aurangzeb (1676).

=== Losar Baoli ===
Sultan Sher Shah Suri, who built the famous Grand Trunk Road (GT Road), built a 'Baoli' or stepwell alongside the historic Grank Trunk road. It is said that the 'Baoli' was built for Sher Shah's horses used to drink water. Currently, the Baoli stands preserved as a remnant of the Suri Empire in a park named Sher Shah Suri park in honour of the Suri Emperor.

=== Jamia Masjid ===
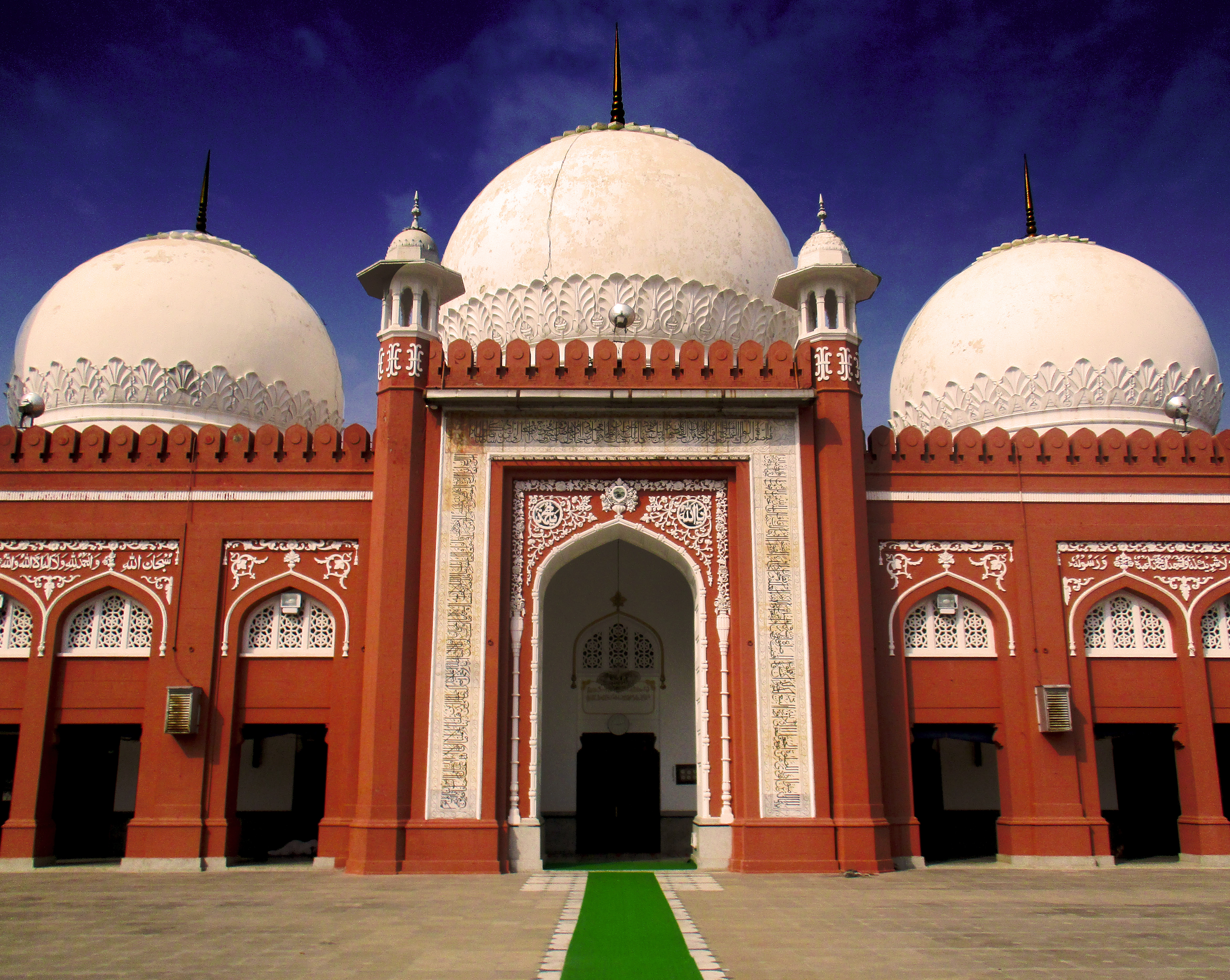
The main three domes of Jamia Mosque draw heavy inspiration from Badshahi Mosque in Lahore

The Jamia Masjid (also known as Markazi Jamia Masjid) is the principal congregational mosque of Wah Cantonment, located on Quaid Avenue. The mosque was inaugurated by the then President of Pakistan, Muhammad Ayub Khan, on 5 April 1959.

The mosque draws heavy inspiration from Mughal architecture, particularly resembling Lahore's iconic Badshahi Mosque. The mosque features a traditional Mughal layout with a large rectangular courtyard, a triple-dome prayer hall, and two prominent minarets flanking the structure. The mosque also acts as a seminary and offers Hifz-ul-Qur’an programs to students.

During special occasions like Mawlid (12 Rabi‑ul‑Awal) and Independence Day (14 August), the mosque is illuminated with decorative lighting, drawing large crowds of local residents each year.

=== Railway Station ===
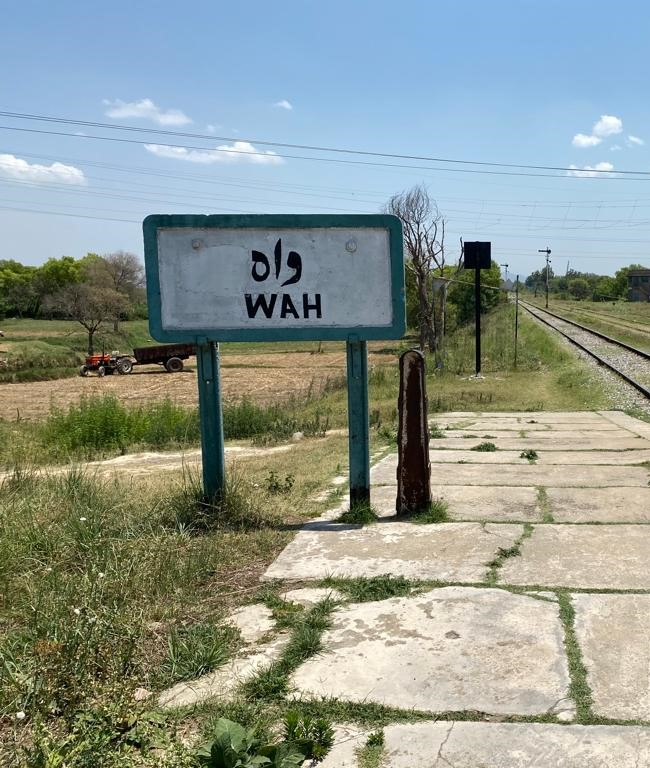
Sign board of Wah railway station

The city of Wah Cantonment is served by three railway stations, operated by Pakistan Railways, all three are located along the Karachi–Peshawar main line, also known as Main Line 1, and were constructed and inaugurated during the British Raj.

==== Wah Cantonment railway station ====
This rail line was established in the late 19th century during the British Raj and the railway station began operations in 1913.

==== Budho Railway Station ====
This railway station was established in 1881 during the British Raj. It is the penultimate railway station of Rawalpindi Division.

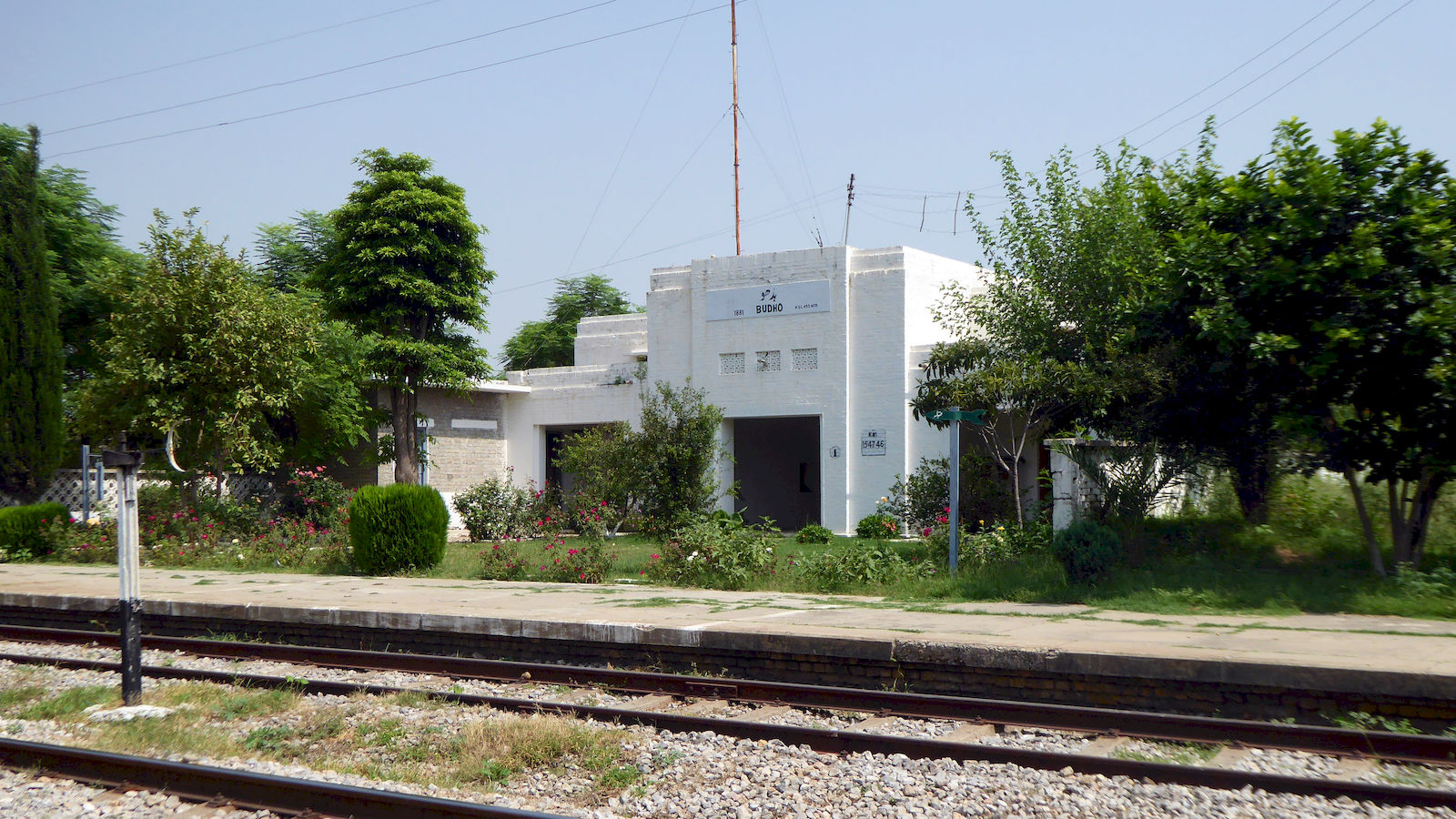
Budho railway station

==== Wah Railway Station ====
Wah Railway Station, opened in 1909, is the largest of the three railway stations located in Wah Cantonment. It is the last railway station of Rawalpindi Division.

== Sports ==
Wah Cantonment has hosted the following notable sporting events.

=== 1st WISPA Squash Competition (2005) ===
Wah Cantonment hosted Pakistan's first international women's squash WISPA (Women's International Squash Player's Association) tournament, the WISPA event, held from 28 August to 2 September 2005 at the Jahangir Khan Squash Complex. The tournament featured international players from Pakistan, England, Malaysia, Denmark, South Korea, and India, and offered prize money around US$7,000. England-based Pakistani squasher Carla Khan won the title, defeating Malaysian Sharon Wee in the final with a score of 9–1, 9–4, 9–3—without dropping a single set. The president of World Squash Federation Jahangir Khan attended the event as chief guest.

=== 3rd Asia Circle Style Kabaddi Cup (2016) ===
The event was hosted at the Welfare Club from May 2–6, this regional championship attracted six national teams: Pakistan, India, Iran, Afghanistan, Sri Lanka, and Nepal. Pakistan defended its title by defeating India 50–31 in the final. Pakistan also defeated Iran 47–22 in the opening match and beat Sri Lanka 56–23 during the event. The tournament was televised by PTV Sports.

== Incidents ==
=== 2008 Wah Bombings ===
On 21 August 2008, two suicide bombers blew themselves up killing 70 people and injuring more than 100. The bombers blew themselves up at 1435 Hours when hundreds of workers were leaving after a shift change. Most of the victims were civilian workers.

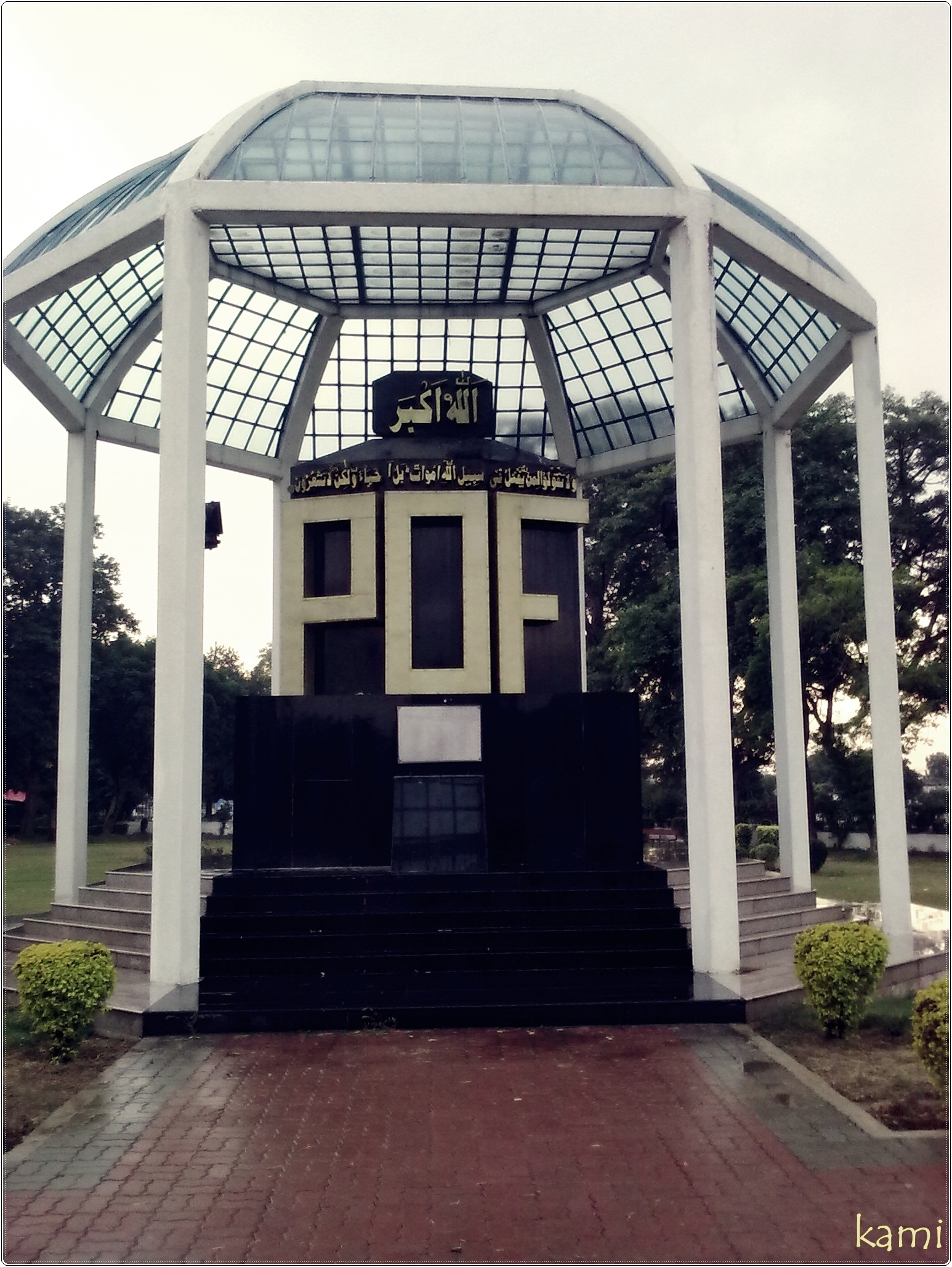
A Yaad Gaar lit. 'Memorial' honouring the martyrs of 2008 Wah Bombings. Bearing the inscription of Quranic Verse 2:154 lit. 'And do not say that those who are killed in the way of Allah are dead; rather, they are alive, but you do not perceive it'

== Notable people ==
Following is the list of notable people that are either born in, associated with, or died in Wah Cantonment

- Sardar Liaqat Hayat Khan, KCIE, OBE, former Minister & Prime Minister of Patiala State, as well as Ambassador of Pakistan to France
- Nawab Muhammad Hayat Khan, CSI, a British Indian Nawab who rose to considerable distinction for his service to the British Raj
- Muhammad Hafeez Qureshi, NI, SI, HI, a Nuclear scientist known for his contribution to Project 706, Pakistan's Nuclear Program.
- General (R) Syed Nadeem Raza, NI(M), HI(M), 2nd last Chairman Joint Chiefs of Staff Committee of Pakistan Armed Forces.
- Dr. Abdul Hafeez, a radiochemistry scientist and explosives engineers, and one of the early pioneers of Pakistan Ordinance Factories.
- Lt. Gen. (R) Ahsan Azhar Hayat Khan, HI(M), Commander V corps, Commandant Pakistan Military Academy, and Pakistan's Ambassador to Jordan.
- Lt. Gen (R) Sardar Hassan Azhar Hayat Khan, HI (M), Commander XI corps, Managing Director Pakistan Land Ports Authority.
- Syed Sohail Hussain Naqvi, SI, current rector USA, former rector LUMS, Executive Director of HEC.
- Olympian Zakir Hussain, won Gold Medal at the 1968 Summer Olympics, and an Olympic silver medal at the 1956 Summer Olympics.
- Fida Ur Rehman, notable Pakistani footballer, won the 1989 and 1991 South Asian Games with Pakistan
- Major Atif-ur-Rehman Shaheed, Pakistan Army Aviation, lost his life in a helicopter crash in Chilas
- Syed Manzoor-ul-Konain, Naat Reciter, Pride of Performance.
- Syed Zabeeb Madood, prominent Naat Reciter
- Baadshah Pehalwan Khan, professional wrestler
