= Wah Gardens =

Garden complex in Pakistan

Coordinates: 33°48′4.67″N 72°42′3.74″E

- واہ باغ
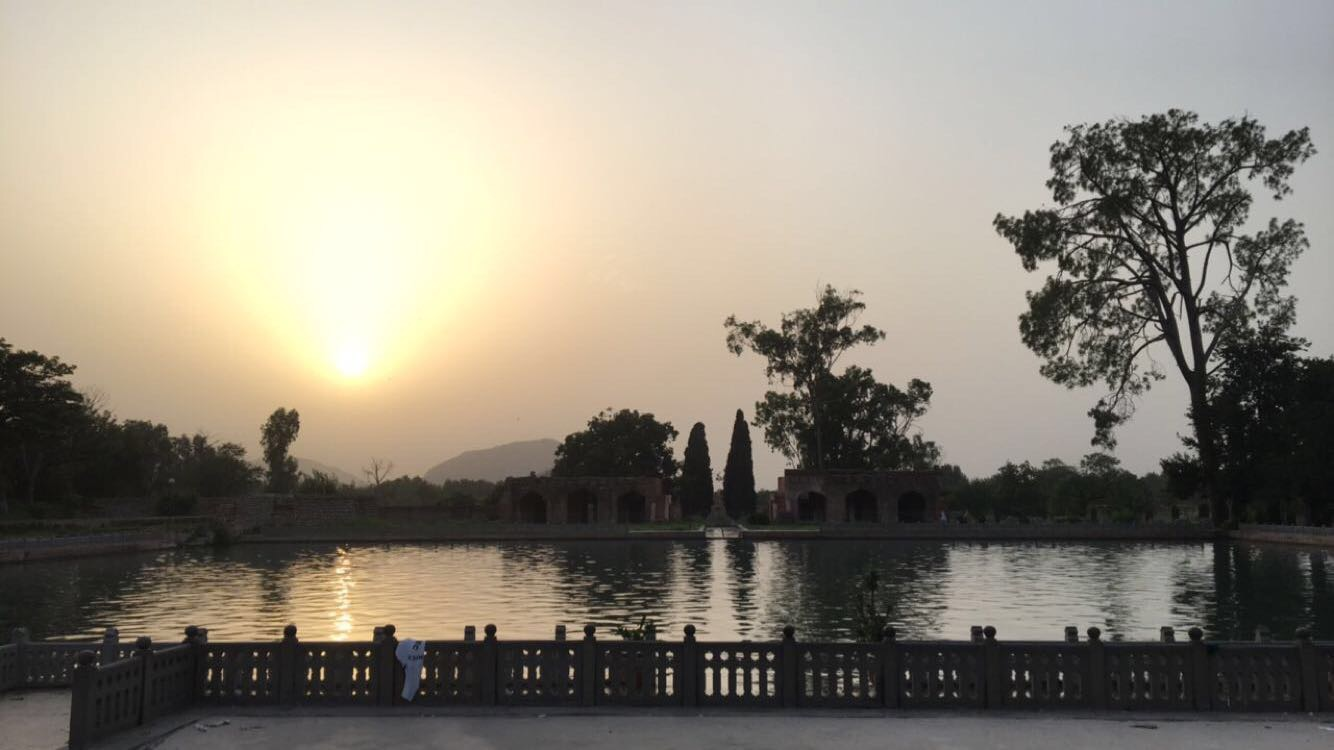
- Front Side of the Wah Gardens
- Location: Hasan Abdal, Pakistan
- Type: Mughal garden

Wah Gardens (Urdu: واہ باغ), also known as Mughal Garden Wah (Urdu: مغلیہ باغات واہ), is a 16th-century garden-complex dating to the reign of the Mughal emperor Akbar, located in the Wah village, near Hasan Abdal, in Punjab, Pakistan. The site, which was largely abandoned after Mughal rule and lay in ruins, has now been restored by the Pakistan Department of Archaeology.

== Location ==
The gardens are in the old village of Wah, close to the present garrison town of Wah, located 50 km northwest of Islamabad on the main Grand Trunk Road.

== History ==
Raja Man Singh, the brother-in-law of emperor Jahangir and a court chief of Akbar, is credited with construction of the gardens along the old route from Lahore to Srinagar. He was posted at Wah from the year 1581 to 1586 to prevent enemy incursions. During his stay, he constructed a pond surrounded by a structure of twelve doors.

The emperor Jahangir, while on his way to Kabul, stayed here on 29 April 1607 and went fishing in the pond. Initially, the present old village of Wah was known as 'Jalal Sar' after Jalal Khan Khattar, but was renamed 'Wah' by Jahangir. Jahangir wrote in his autobiography, Jahangirnama:

"Stayed at Baba Hasanabdal on 12th Muharram, 1016 A.H. At about two miles on the eastern side of this place, there is a waterfall. The water falls with great speed. The center of the pond is the main exit of the waterfall. Raja Maan Singh has made a very small building. There are a lot of fish in the pond, having a length of a quarter yard. I stayed at this beautiful place for three days. I put the net in the pond and caught about 10 to 12 fish. These fish were again dropped in the water after sewing pearls in their noses."

Shah Jahan stayed at Wah while on his way to Kabul in 1639 and ordered the reconstruction of the buildings. Ustad Ahmad Lahori, the famous architect of the period, planned out the gardens, palaces, and inns. The construction was undertaken under his supervision and took two years, including twelve-door structures, canals, and waterfalls. He also built bathrooms with having mixture of cold and hot water at the southern end of these twelve-door structures. The inner portion of the structures has been plastered. The walls of the smaller rooms have been decorated with flowers and petals.

Shah Jahan stayed at the gardens on his trips to Kabul four times after their completion: in 1646, 1647, 1649, and 1654. Contemporary historians of Shah Jahan, namely Abdul Hamid Lahori and Muhammad Saleh Kamboh, called the garden as a trustee of heaven and a substitute for heaven's garden on earth.

The emperor Aurangzeb stayed at the garden in July 1676. The garden was badly damaged during the era of the Durrani Empire (1747–1826). After the annexation of the Punjab, the British Government handed over the gardens to Nawab Muhammad Hayat Khan, CSI, in 1865.

== Restoration ==
Considering the historical importance of the gardens and their artistic construction, the Government of Pakistan handed over the garden to the Department of Archaeology to look after. It was decades later when on the request of Lt Gen Omar Mahmood Hayat, Chairman POF Wah, that the Archeology department initiated repairs. Work has started to restore and save the garden.

The reconstruction of the four walls of the garden, the big pond, the canals, and the paths is near completion. The work of replanting the trees that were there in Mughal days, repairs of the twelve-door structures, the bathrooms, and waterfalls will be completed soon. Once completed, the gardens are expected to return to their former state.

== Gallery ==
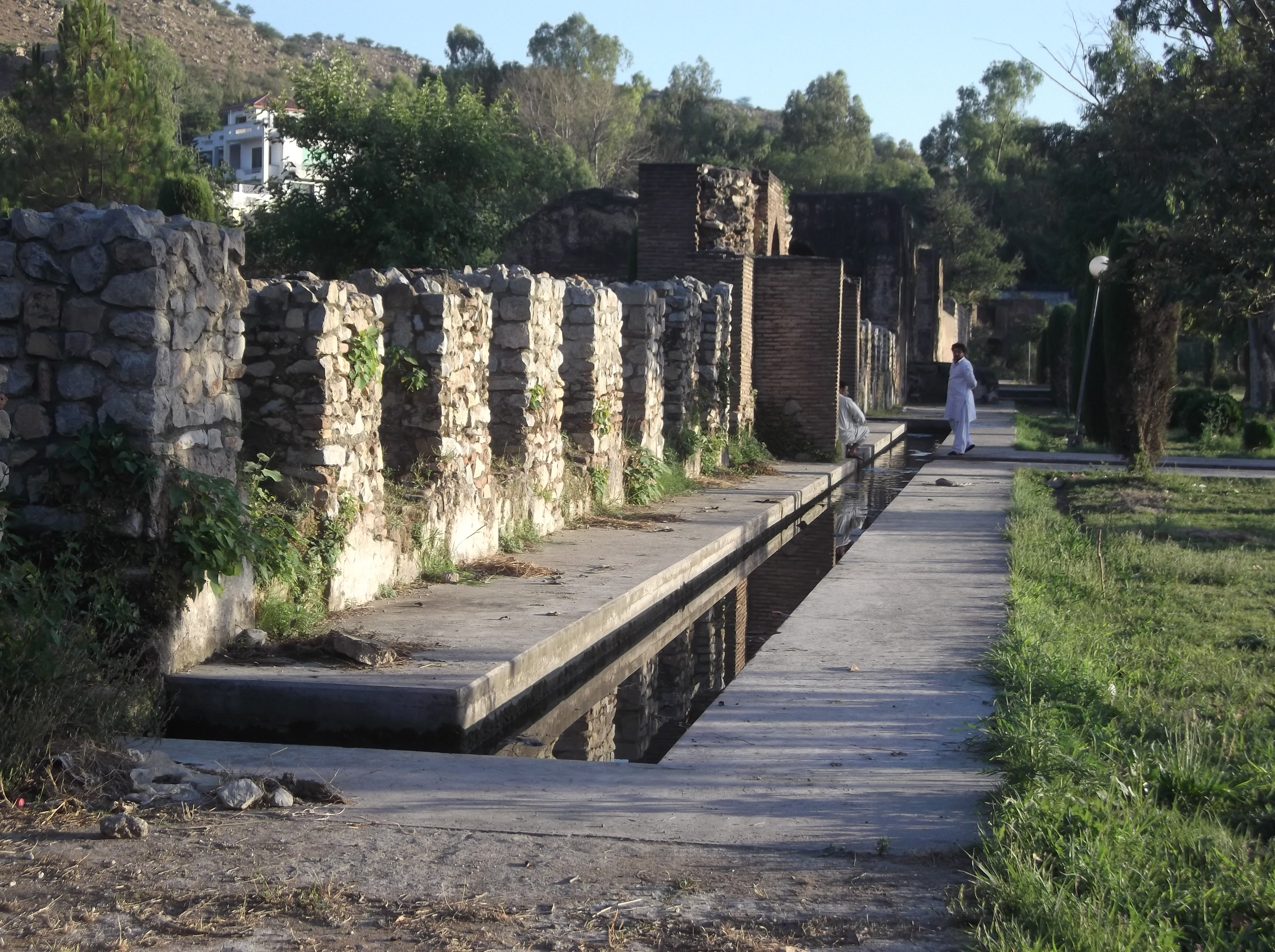

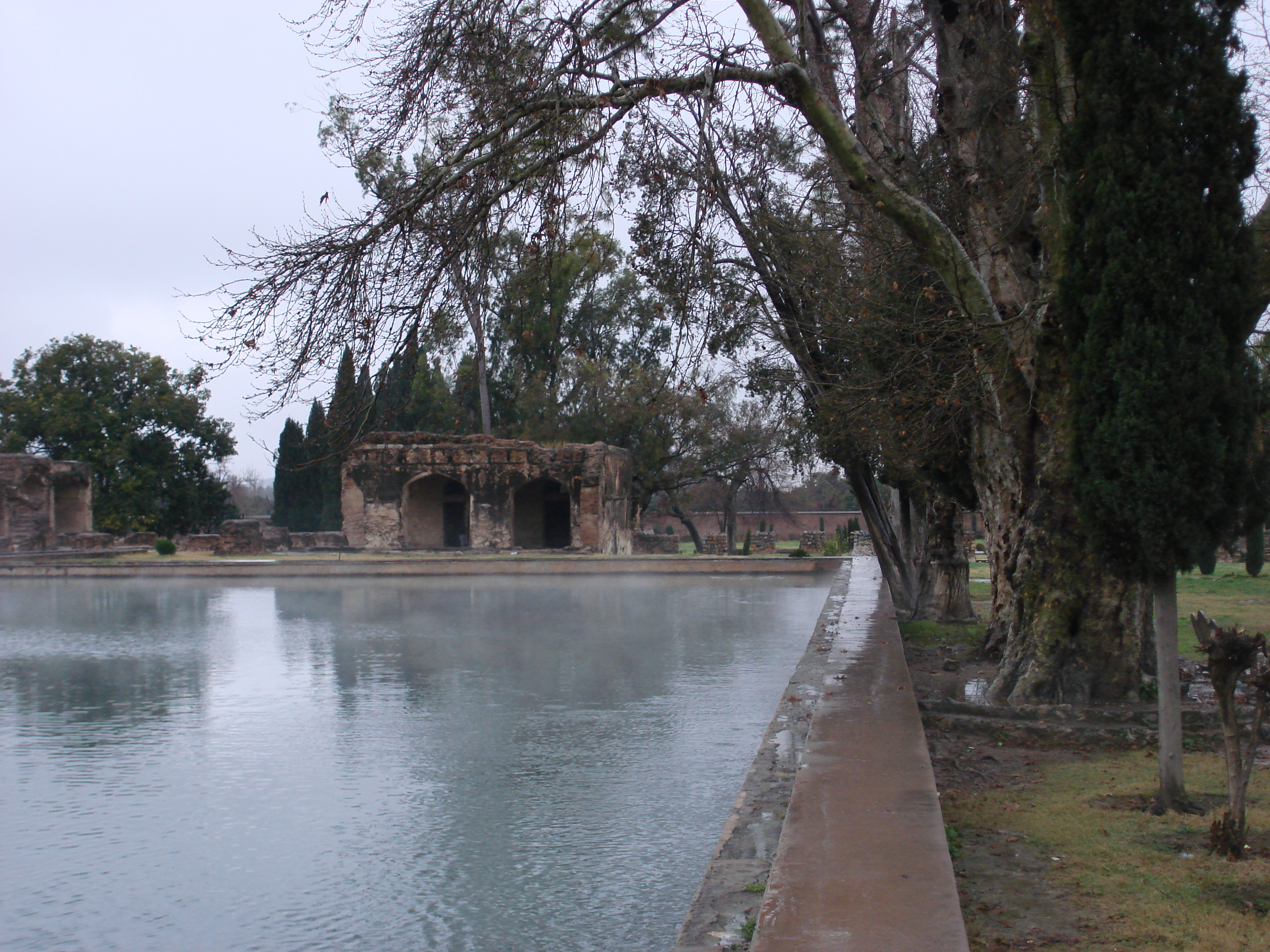

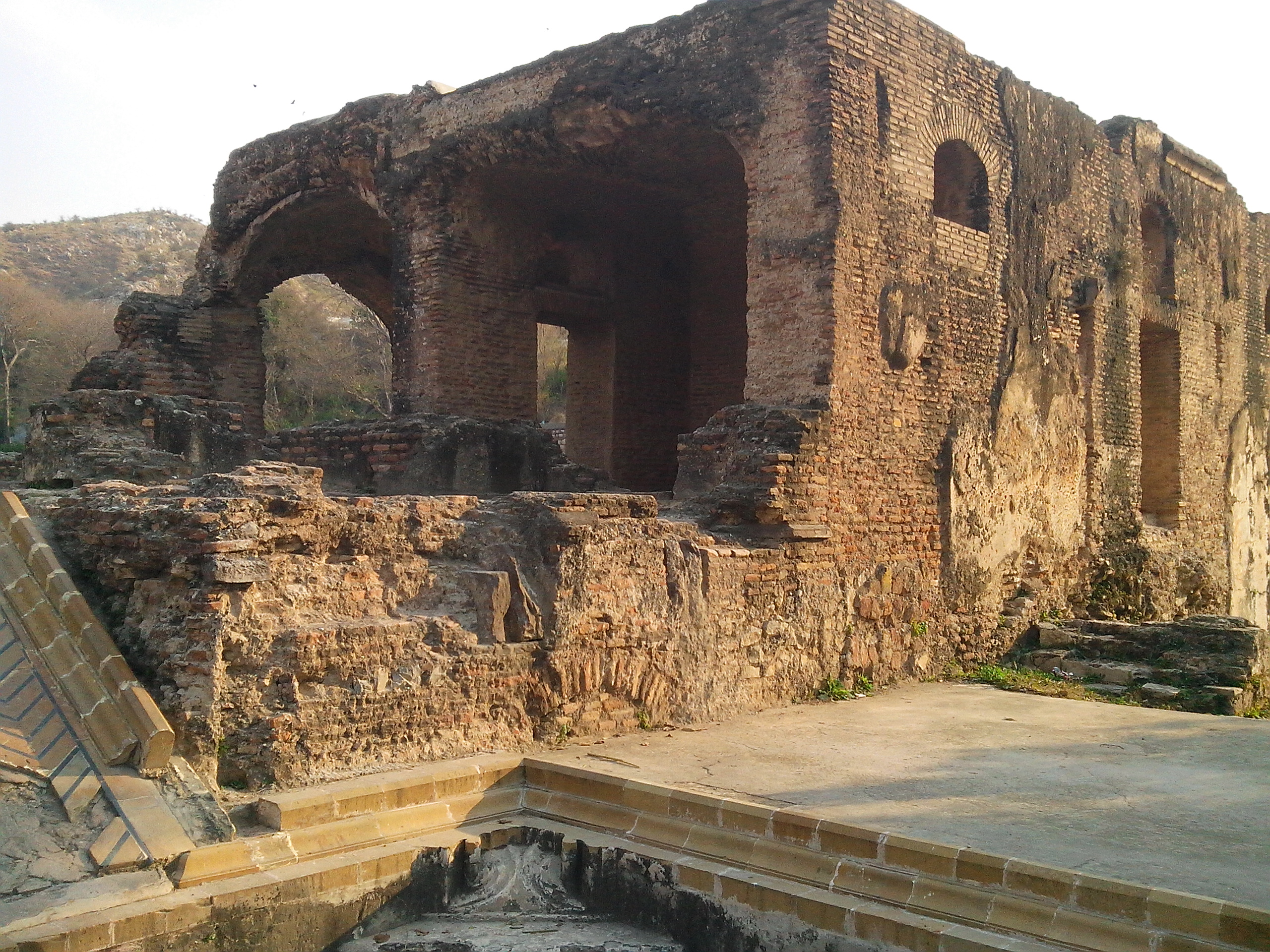

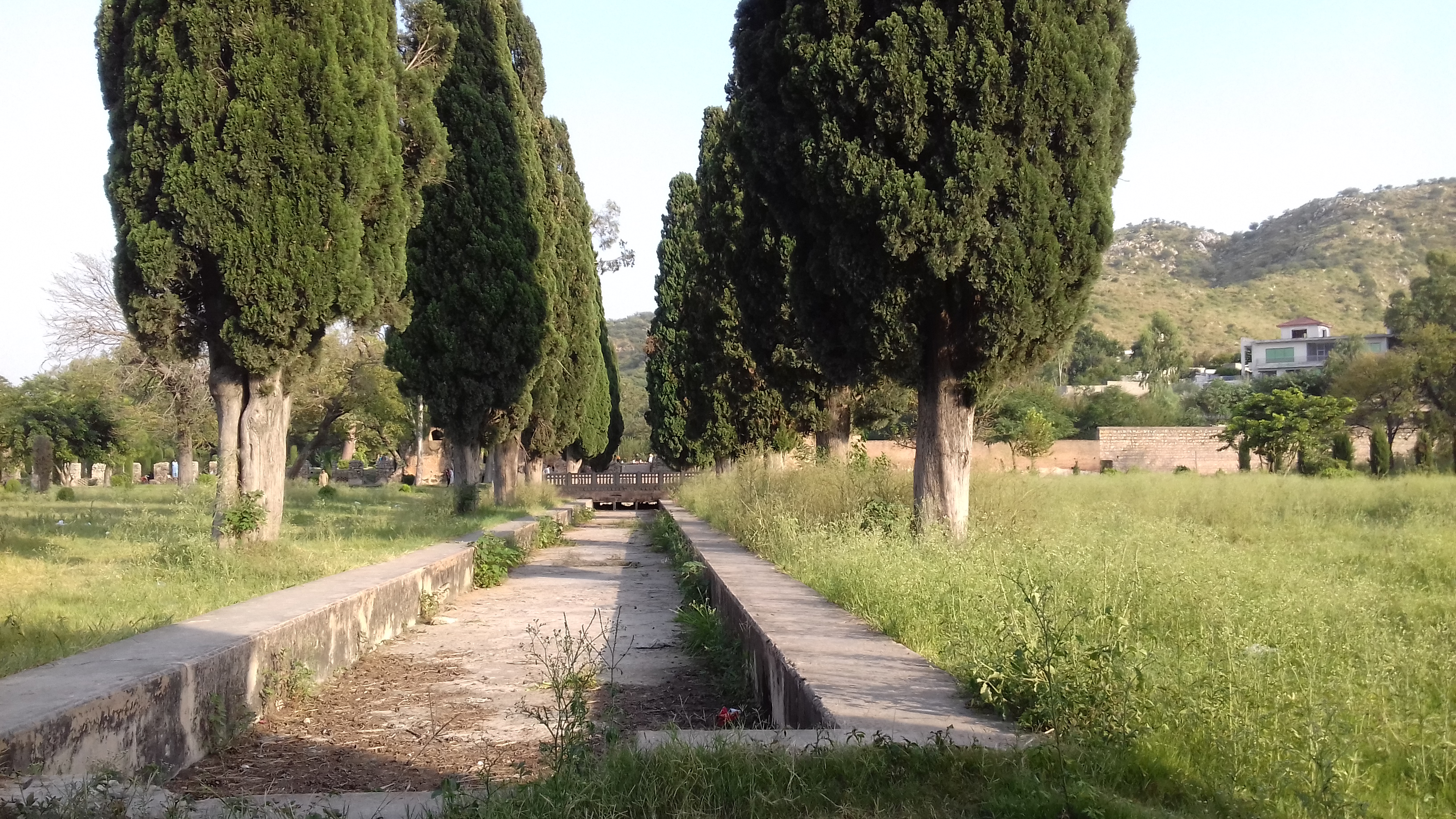

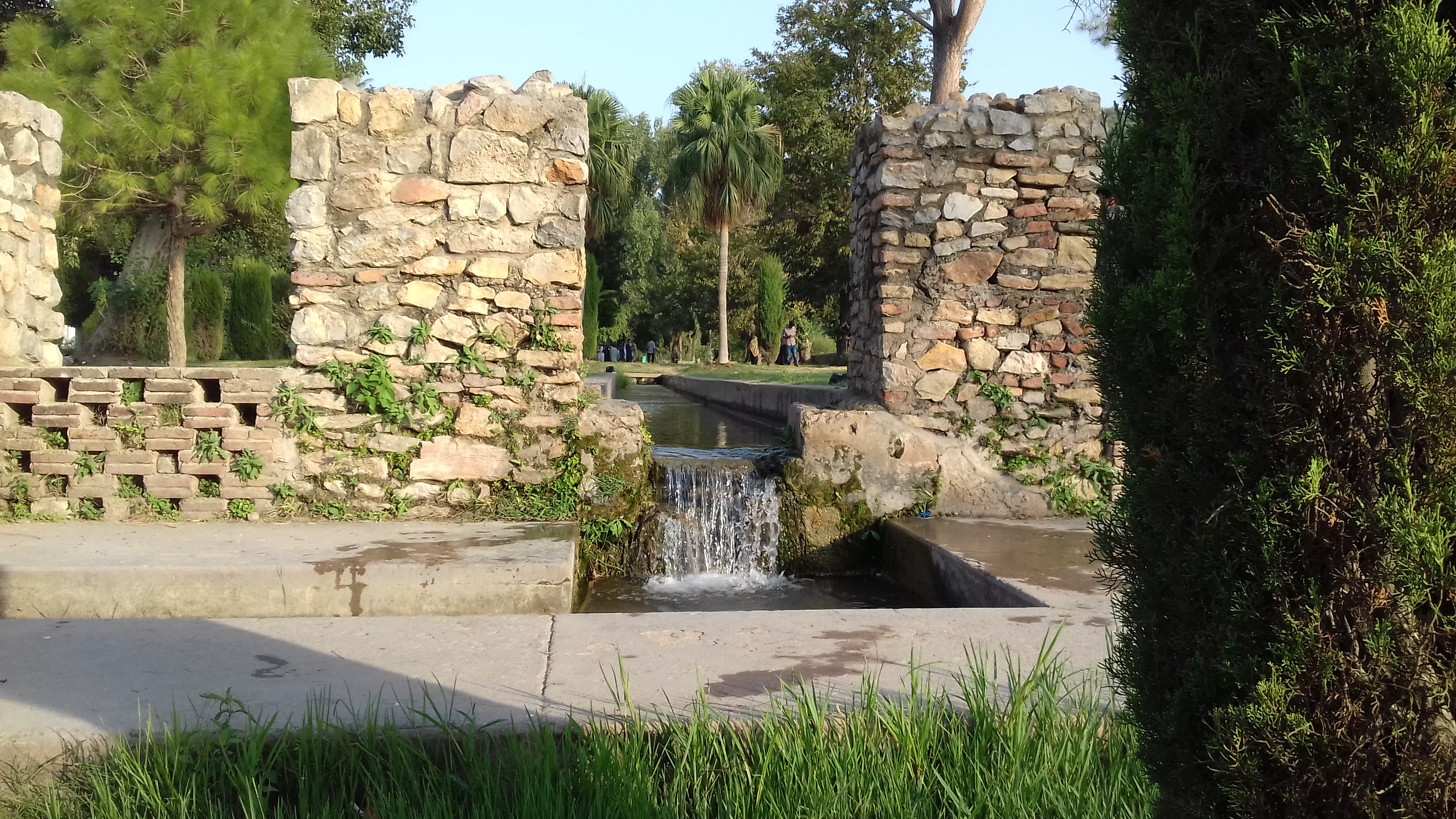

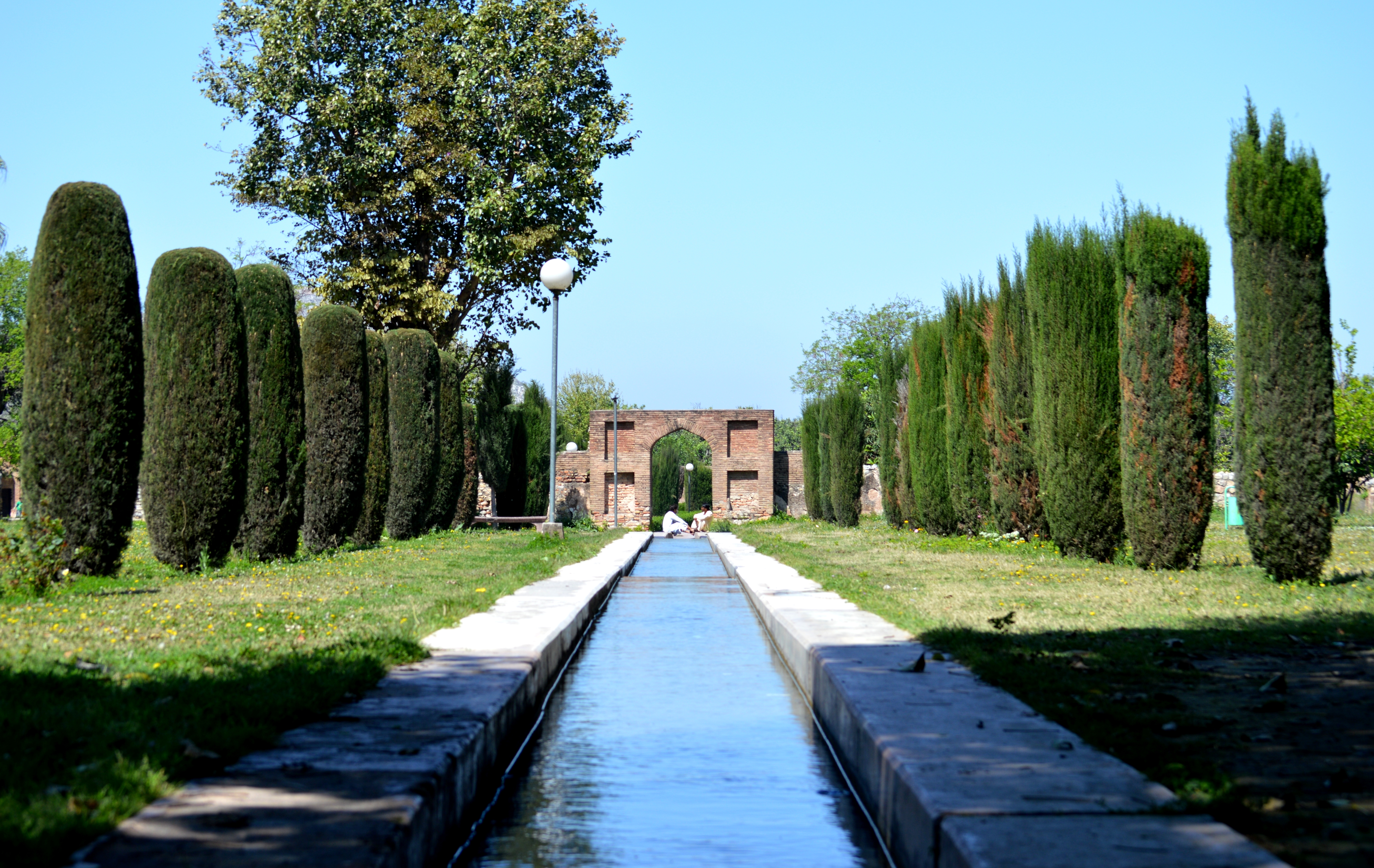

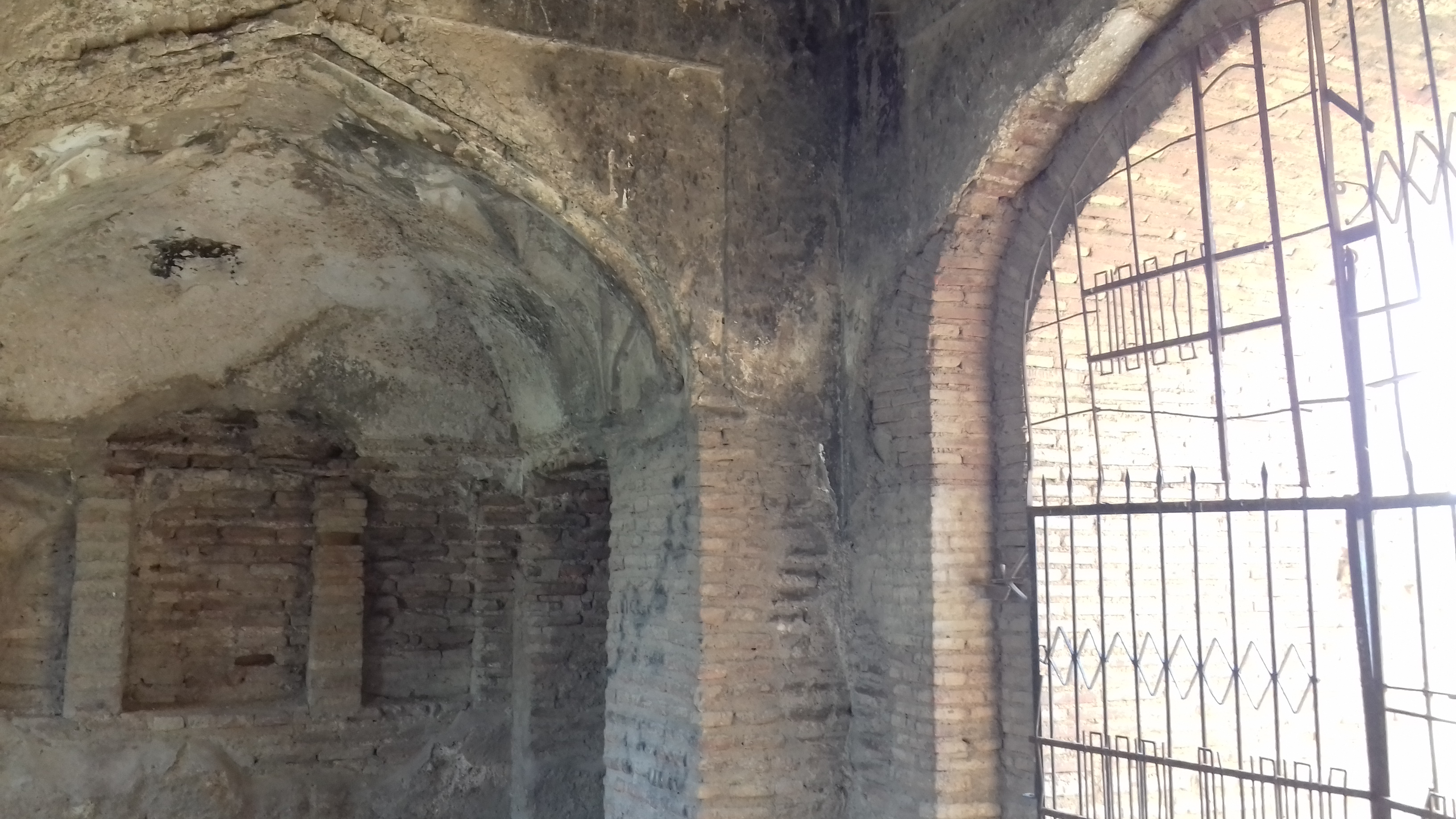

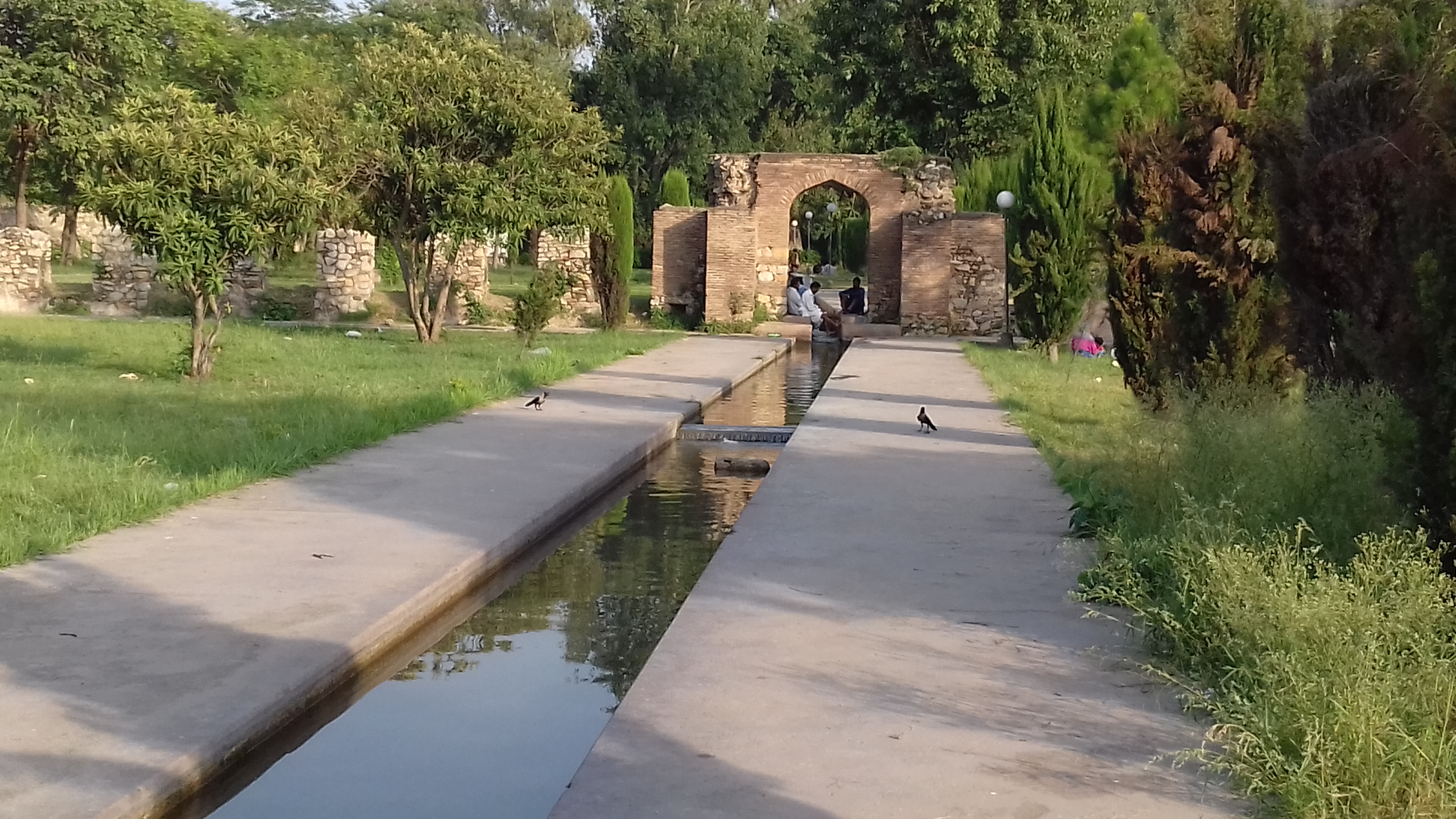

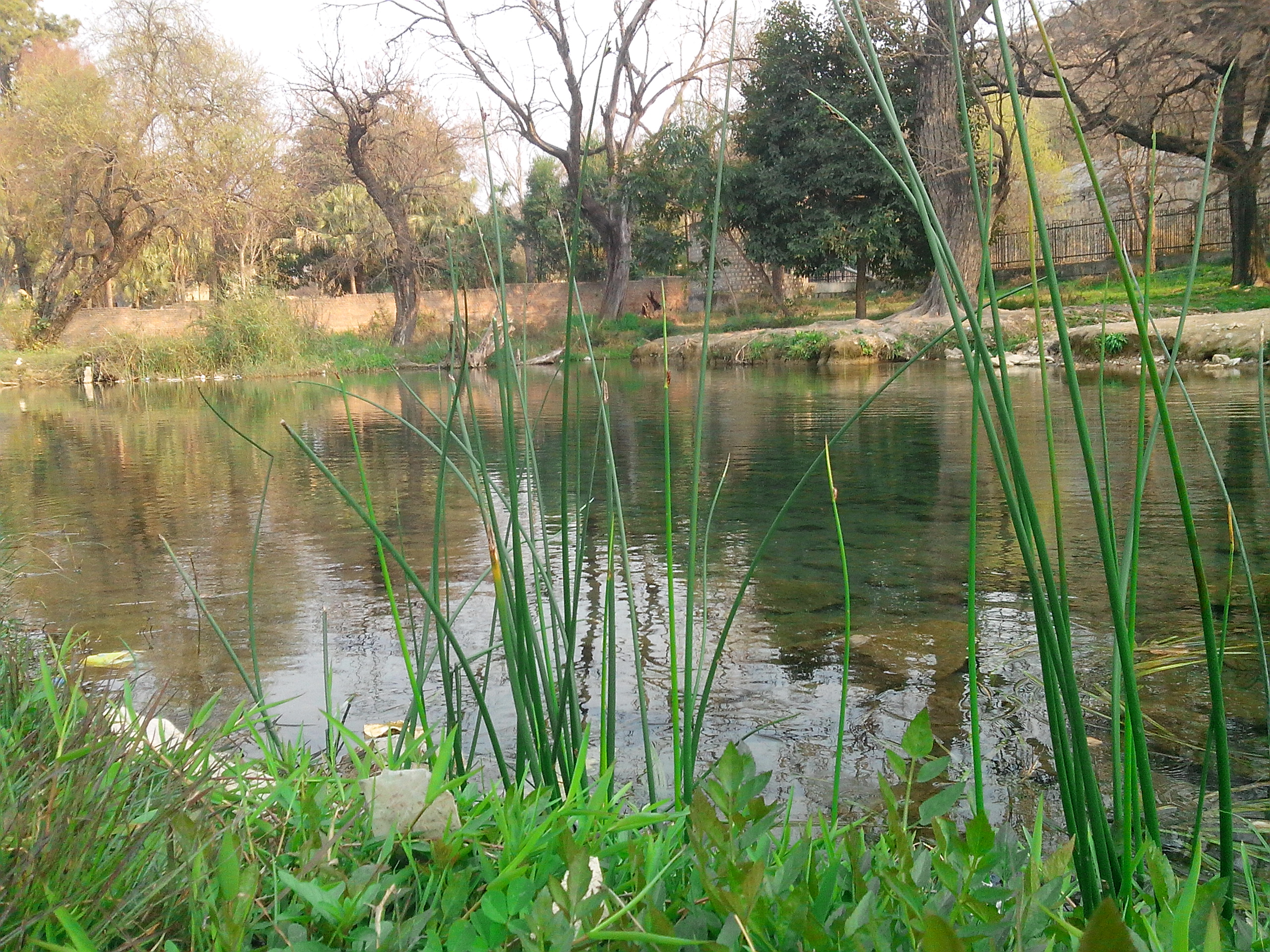

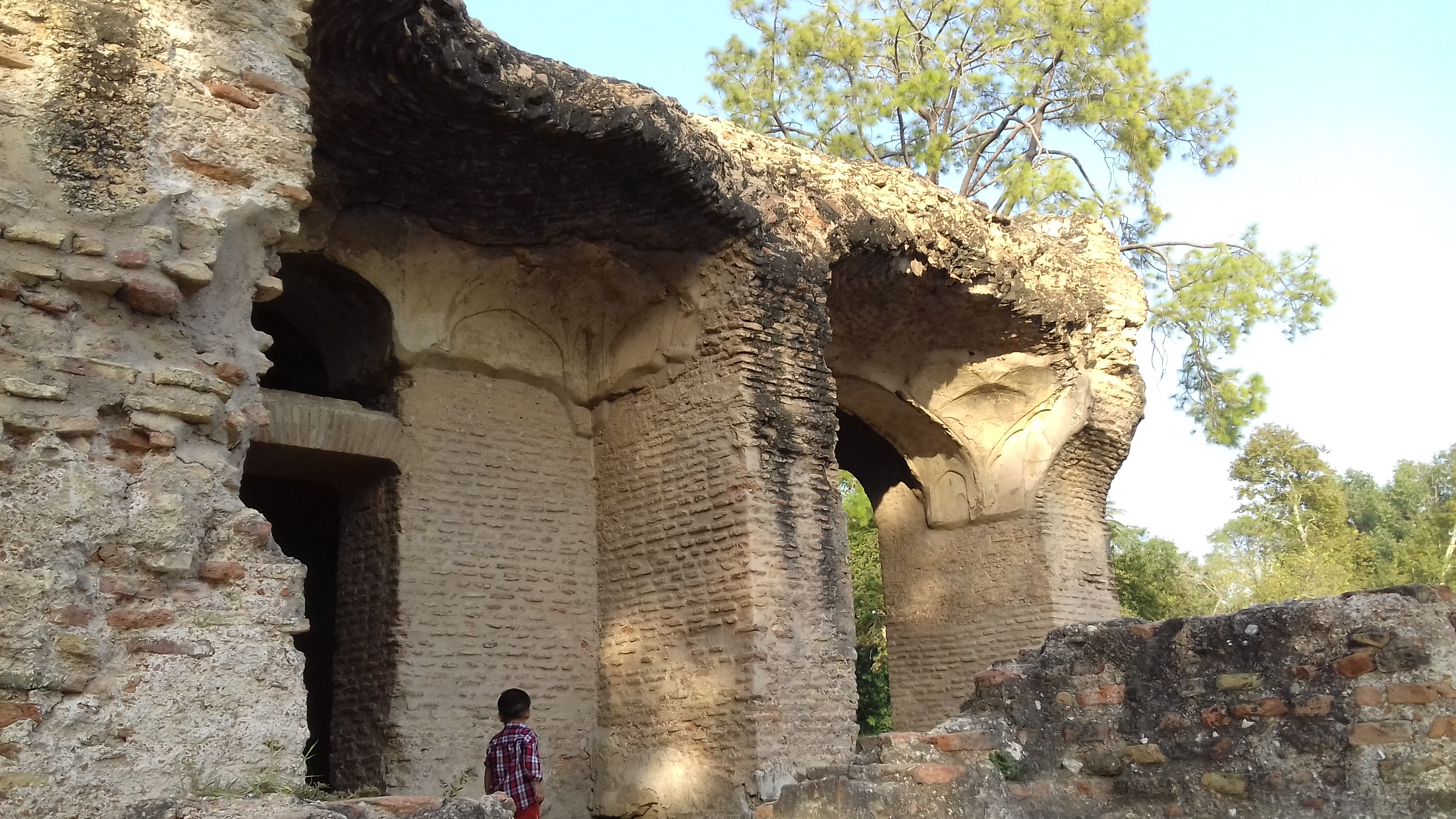

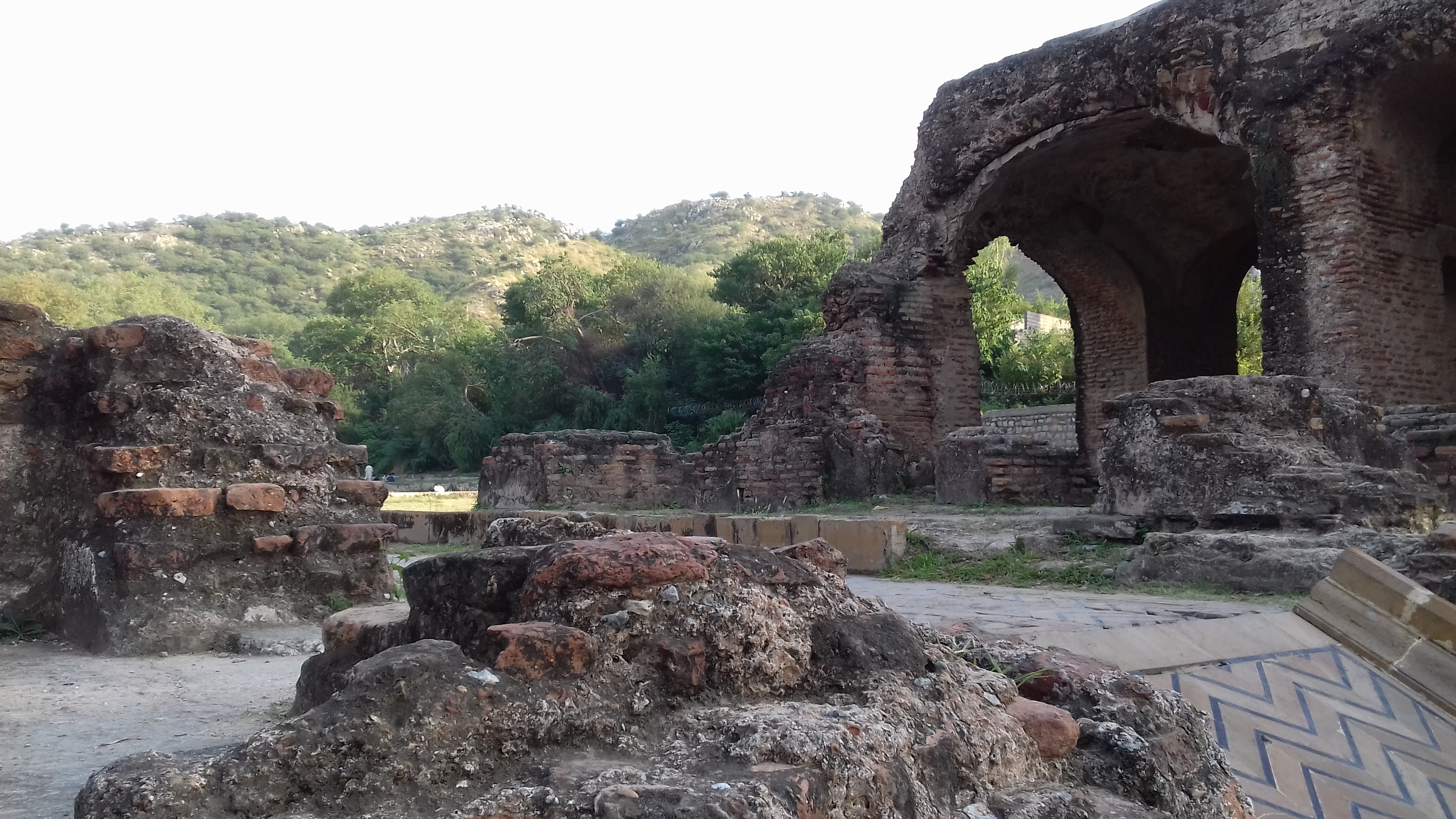

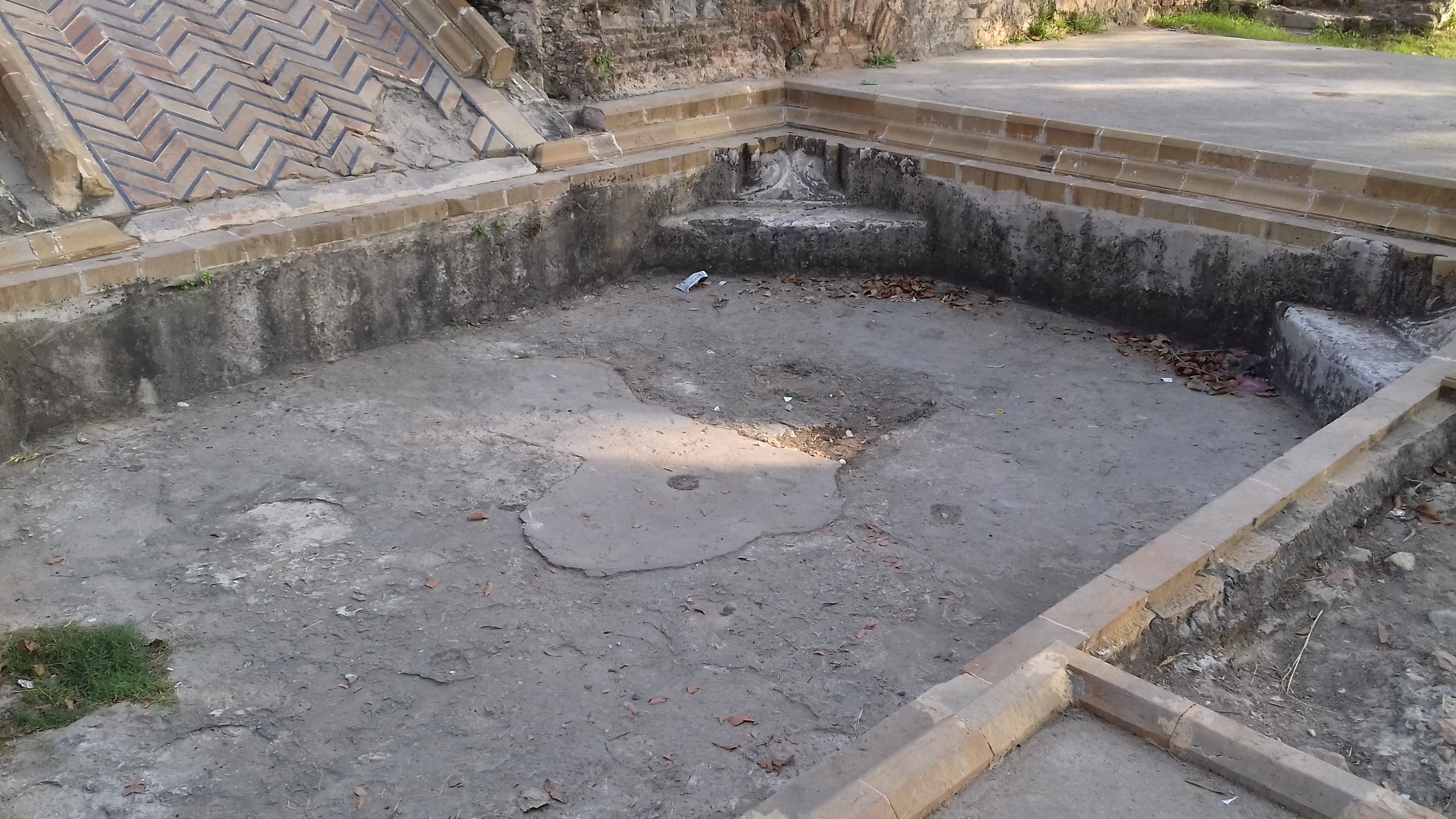
The "Prince's pool"

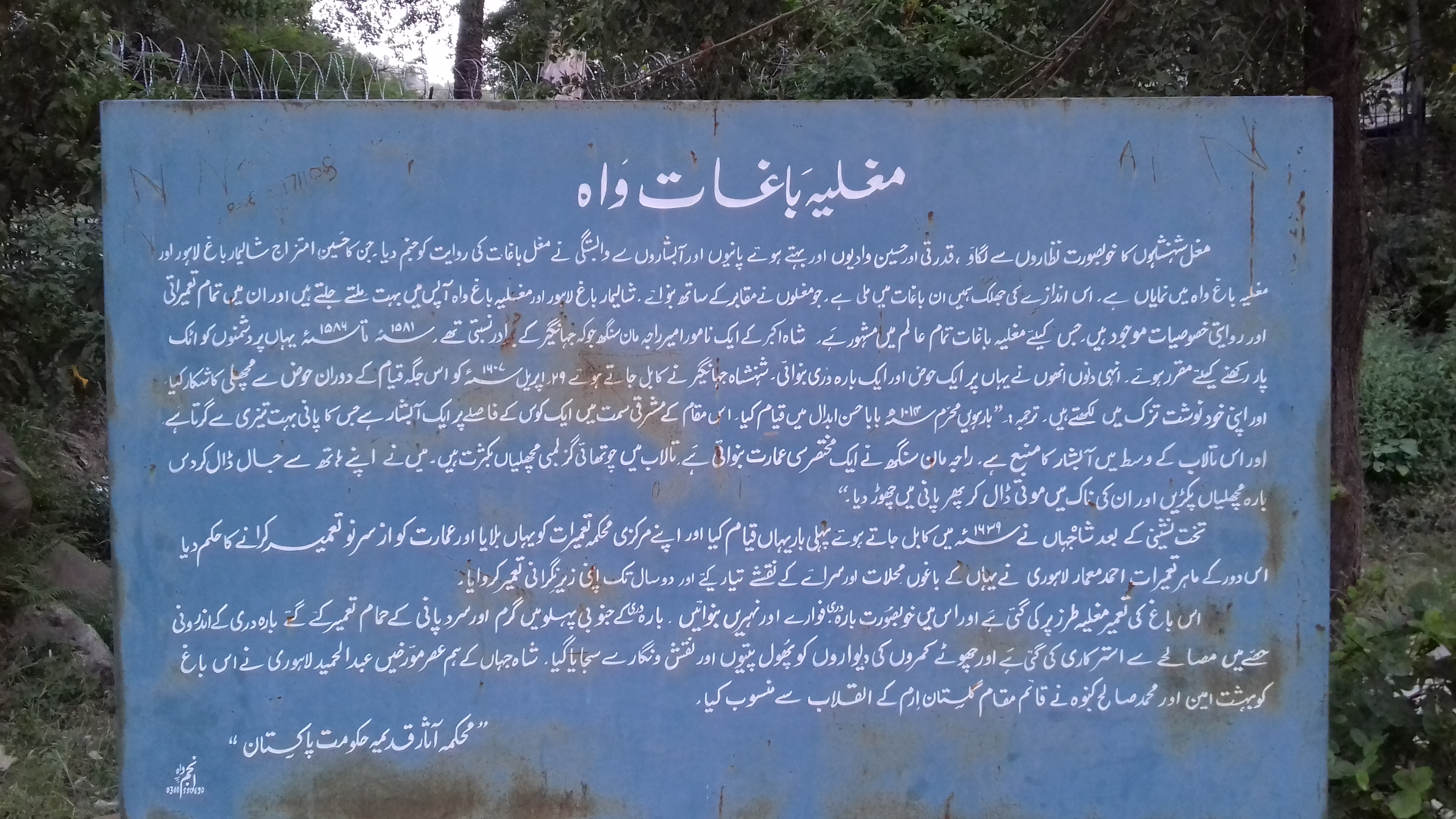

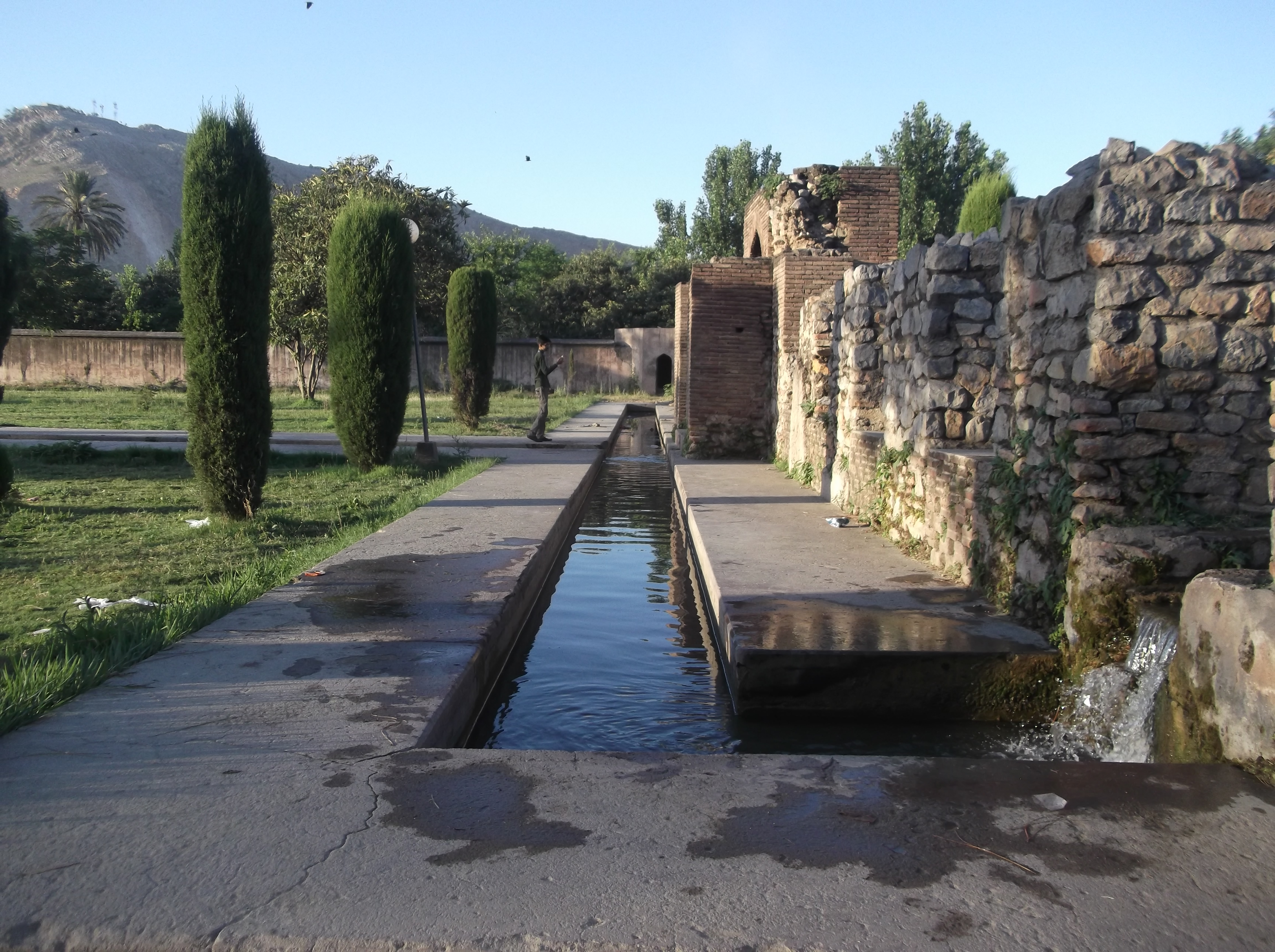

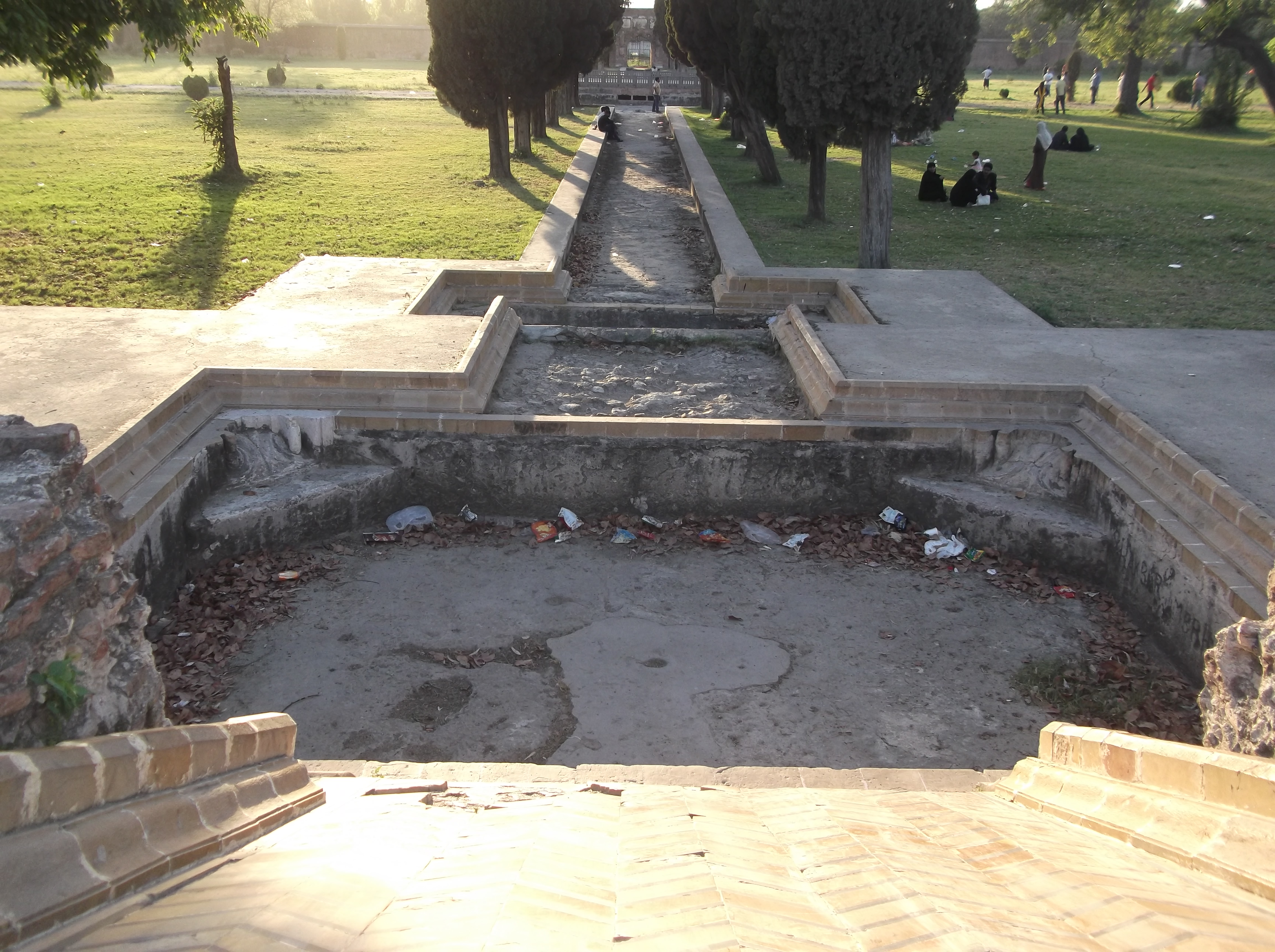

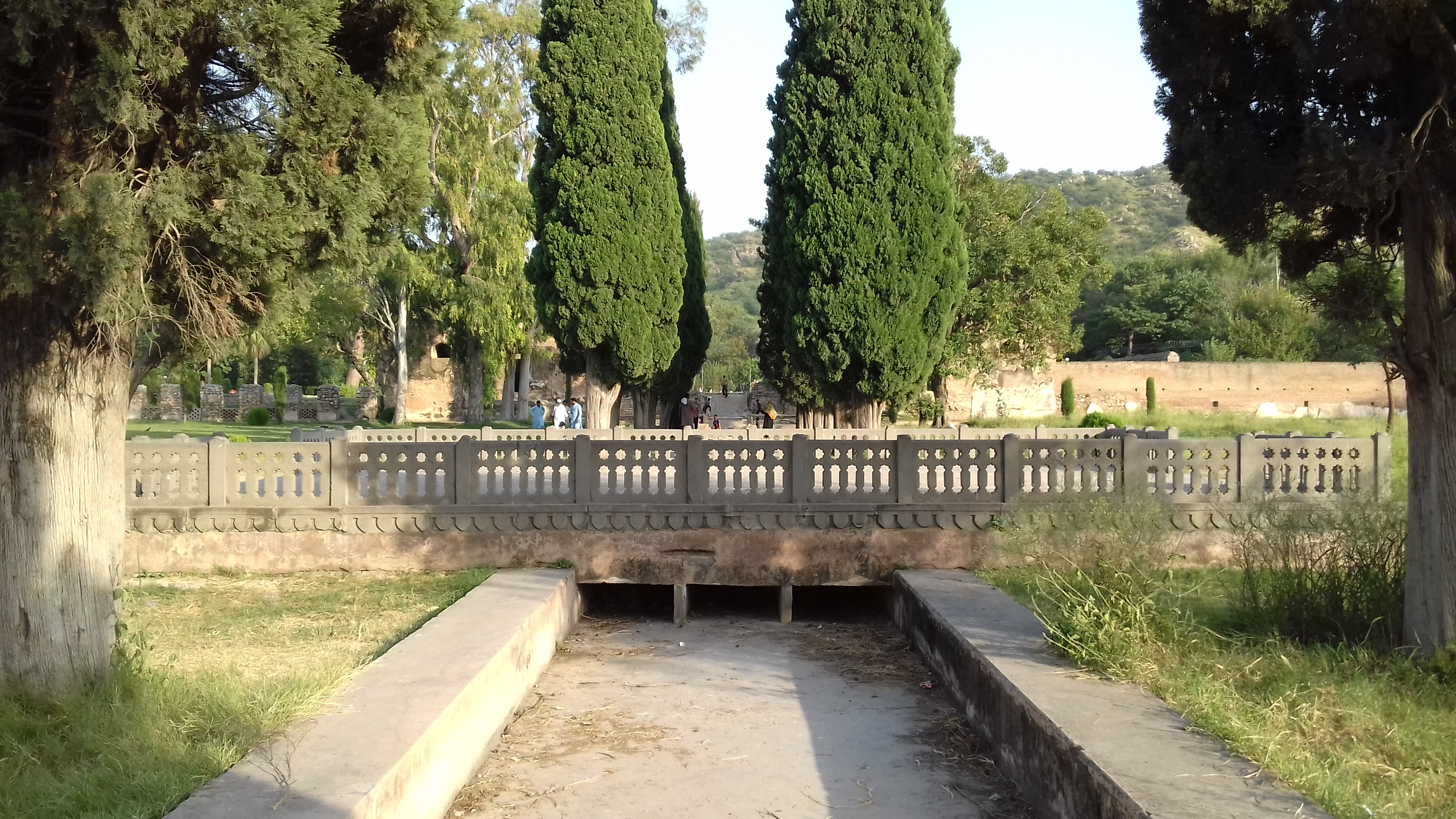

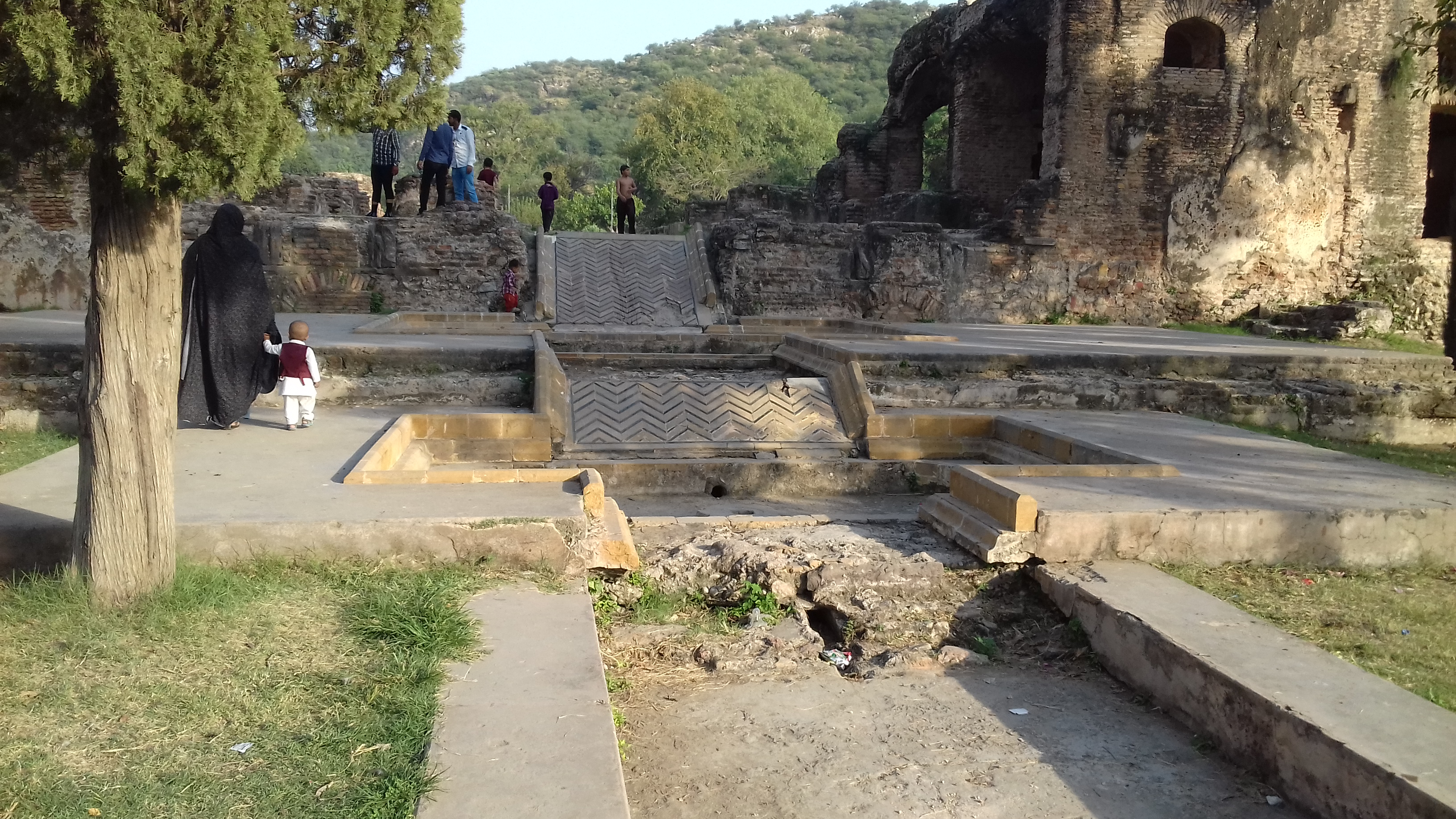
