= POF Metallurgical Laboratory =

National laboratory in Wah, Pakistan

- Established: 1972
- Field of research: Fundamental science; Material Science; Non-ferrous metal
- Location: Wah in Punjab, Pakistan
- Affiliations: University of Punjab, Lahore
- Operating agency: Pakistan Ordnance Factories
- Website: www.pmt-labs.com.pk

The POF Metallurgical Laboratory (also known as "ML") is a multi-mission research and development laboratory located near the Pakistan Ordnance Factories (POF) in Wah Cantonment, Punjab, Pakistan. It is a part of POF Materials Testing Laboratories (PMTL Labs).

Established in 1972 to study non-ferrous metals, it played an important role during the development of Pakistan's clandestine nuclear weapons program. Its research activities includes research into non-ferrous and ferrous metals, electronic materials, materials science as well as testing, quality assurance, certification and accreditation.

== History ==
The Pakistan Atomic Energy Commission (PAEC) used the Metallurgical Laboratory in 1972 to conduct basic research into the chemistry and physical metallurgy of non-ferrous metals. Dr. Khalil Qureshi played a pioneering role as the lab's principal investigator.

The lab also undertook classified studies, as codename: Wah Group Scientists, in designing and developing the non-nuclear physical components and performing metallurgy testing of explosives to be used in nuclear devices under Dr. Zaman Sheikh, a physical chemist. The importance of its work in materials science and understanding the chemistry and metallurgy of plutonium evolved in the Metallurgical Laboratory into a critical laboratory, similar to the Pakistan Institute of Nuclear Science & Technology. Due to the sensitivity of the projects and security concerns of scientists at the Khan Research Laboratories (KRL), the program was definitely moved to KRL in the 1980s. Nonetheless, the laboratory remains critical in weapons development and took leading initiatives in designing and materials testing of non-nuclear physical components.

== Current Role ==
These days POF Metallurgical Laboratory offers a variety of material testing services, including:

- Metallographic testing: This examines the microstructure of metals and alloys to understand their properties and behavior.
- Chemical analysis: This determines the elemental composition of a material.
- Mechanical testing: This evaluates the mechanical properties of a material, such as its strength, ductility, and hardness.
- Testing for ferrous and non-ferrous materials: ML can test both iron-based (ferrous) and non-iron-based (non-ferrous) metals and alloys.

== Accreditations ==
The lab is accredited by various accreditation bodies including PNAC and ISO 14001:2004 by TUV Austria Bureau.

== Customers ==
Following industries utilize the services of ML:

- Automobile industry
- Research Institute
- Oil and gas Industries
- Defense production
- Manufacturing units
- Research & Development
- Steel industries
