= University of Wah =

University in Pakistan

University of Wah واہ یونیورسٹی
- Motto: Competence through Excellence
- Type: Private
- Established: 2005
- Affiliations: Higher Education Commission (Pakistan), Pakistan Engineering Council
- Chancellor: Governor of the Punjab
- Location: Wah Cantonment, Punjab, Pakistan
- Website: uow.edu.pk

The University of Wah (UOW) is a private university located at Wah, Punjab, Pakistan. It was established in 2005. It offers bachelors, masters and doctoral programs in basic sciences, social sciences, management sciences, computer science and engineering. Its one of the renowned degree is Bachelor of Science in Mechatronics Engineering. Now Wah Engineering College (WEC) offered MS and PhD programs also and aims to introduce the Artificial Intelligence degree in upcoming years.

== Overview ==
The university of wah is one of the fastest growing engineering institute in Pakistan. The graduates from the university are working in various national and multinational firms like Pakistan Ordnance Factories(POF), Descon Engineering Limited, Heavy Mechanical Complex, etc. The university has two constituent colleges named Mashal Degree College for Women and Wah Engineering College.

== Faculties ==
- Faculty of Engineering (Wah Engineering College)
- Faculty of Basic Sciences
- Faculty of Computer Sciences
- Faculty of Management Sciences
- Faculty of Social Sciences and Humanities

== See also ==
- Wah Engineering College
- Mashal Degree College for Girls
- Pakistan Ordnance Factories
