= National University of Pakistan =

University established in 2023

- Motto: Learn to Lead
- Type: Public
- Established: 2023
- Affiliations: Higher Education Commission
- Chancellor: President Asif Ali Zardari
- Rector: Maj Gen Qaiser Suleman HI(M)
- Location: Islamabad, Pakistan
- Website: nup.edu.pk

The National University of Pakistan (NUP) is a university in Islamabad, Pakistan. The creation of this university was made possible by the passing of the National University of Pakistan Bill in 2023. The bill was presented in the National Assembly by Murtaza Javed Abbasi Minister for Parliamentary Affairs, on behalf of Khawaja Muhammad Asif Minister for Defence. On 20 April 2023, Arif Alvi gave his approval to the bill.

On 28 July 2023, the National Assembly approved the establishment of the National University of Pakistan along with 25 other universities and educational institutes. This decision drew criticism from the Chairman of the Public Accounts Committee (PAC), Noor Alam Khan, who raised concerns about the quality of education being provided in universities, especially those in the private sector.
