= Budho railway station =

Railway station in Punjab, Pakistan

Coordinates: 33°48′N 72°46′E

Budho Railway Station
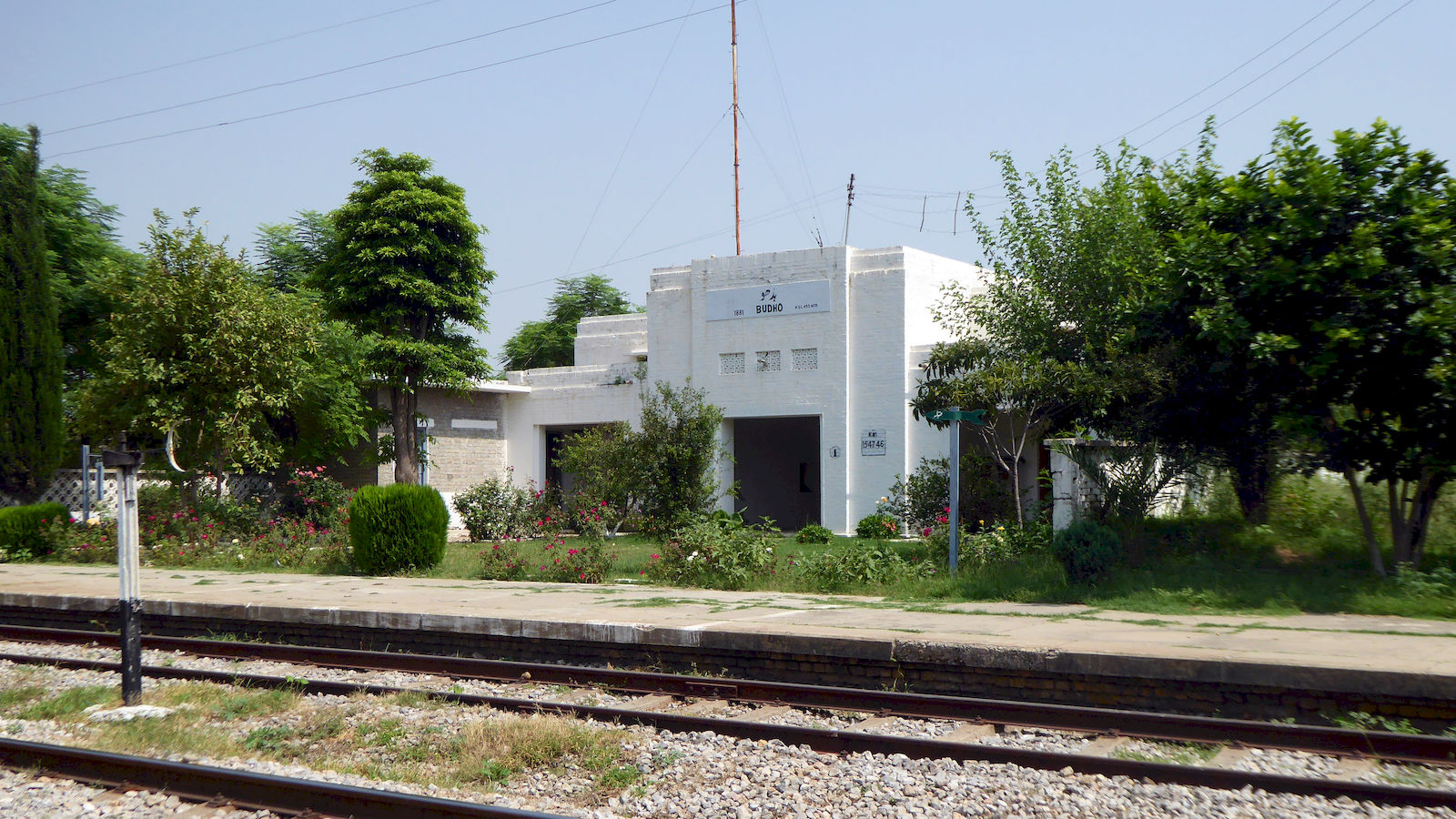

General information
- Owner: Ministry of Railways
- Line: Karachi–Peshawar Railway Line

Other information
- Station code: BUO

Services
Preceding station	Pakistan Railways	Following station
Wah Cantonment towards Kiamari	Karachi–Peshawar Line	Wah towards Peshawar Cantonment
Location

Budho Railway Station (Urdu and Punjabi: بودھو ریلوے اسٹیشن) is located in Budho village, Rawalpindi district of Punjab province, Pakistan.

== See also ==
- List of railway stations in Pakistan
- Pakistan Railways

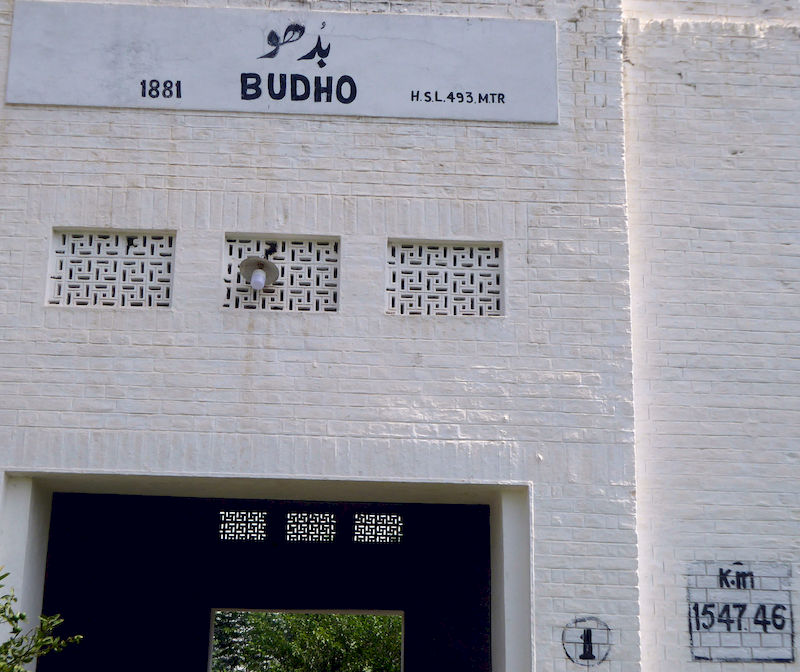
Budho railway station tag
