= Jordan–Pakistan relations =

Bilateral relations

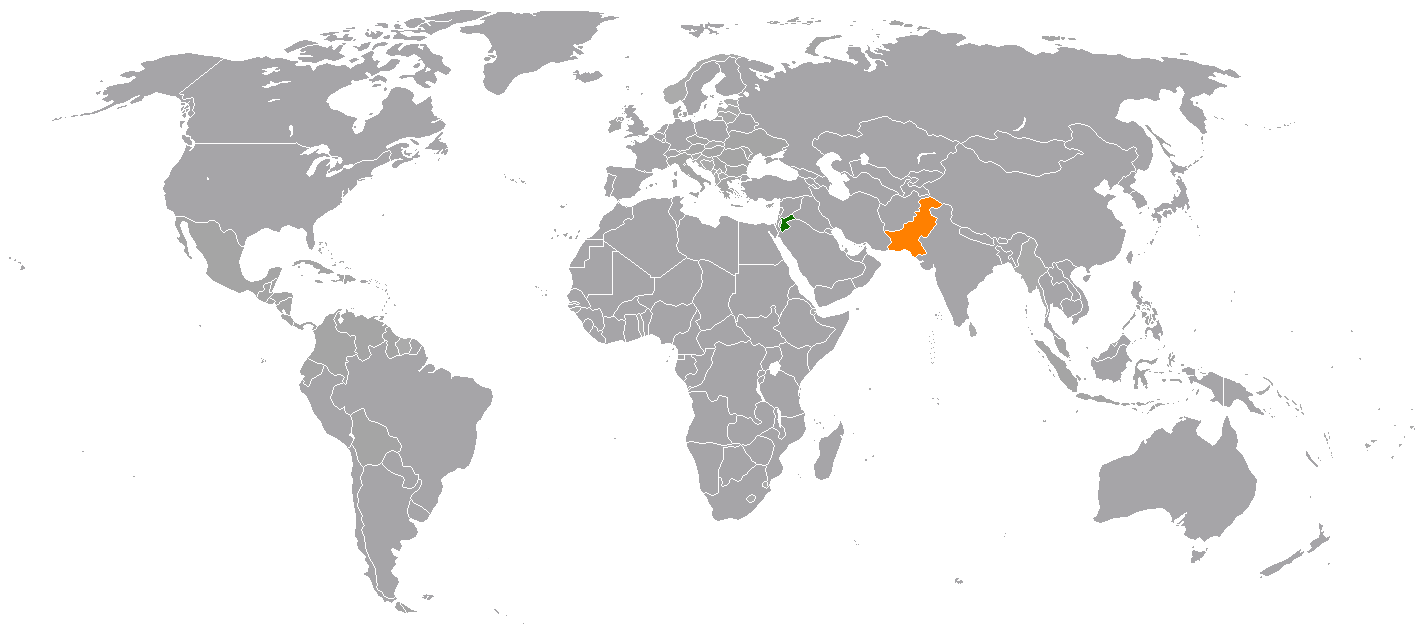

- Jordan: Pakistan

Diplomatic mission
- Embassy of Pakistan, Amman: Embassy of Jordan, Islamabad

Envoy
- Pakistani Ambassador to Jordan Sajjad Ali Khan: Jordanian Ambassador to Pakistan Ibrahim Almadani

Jordan–Pakistan relations are the bilateral relations between the Islamic Republic of Pakistan and the Hashemite Kingdom of Jordan. Pakistan maintains an embassy in Amman whilst Jordan has an embassy in Islamabad.

== History ==
Pakistan-Jordan contacts began in the 1970s and 1980s, growing stronger since the mid-1990s. In 2001, Pakistani leaders visited Amman to discuss full-scale cooperation. The King of Jordan lauded what he called "deep, strong and historical relations" between the two countries and affirmed Jordan's keenness on consolidating its ties with Pakistan for the benefit of the two peoples.

On November 2, 2007, King Abdullah II of Jordan visited Islamabad and held a formal meeting with the incumbent President of Pakistan, General Pervez Musharraf at the Aiwan-e-Sadr.

In the meeting, Musharraf and Abdullah exchanged views on the overall evolution of regional and international situations, particularly in the Middle East. Concerns over the situation in Iraq were also pointed out, including the emerging sectarian and ethnic divides, and frequent incidents of sacrilegious attacks on holy sites.

Musharraf also spoke to King Abdullah about "Pakistan’s efforts to promote peace and stability in South Asia" and for "addressing the challenges of extremism and terrorism." The two leaders expressed satisfaction over the development of the Pakistani-Jordanian bilateral relations in various fields, especially of the cooperation levels that had successfully been established in the economic and trade segments.

== Cultural and geo-political ==
Pakistan and Jordan are both Muslim countries by majority and belong to the Organisation of Islamic Cooperation (OIC).

== Trade and investment ==
As of 2004 and 2005, the trade volume between Pakistan and Jordan remained at $53.837 million, in which Pakistan's exports stood at $21.013 million and imports were registered at $32.806 million. In the past, many Jordanian leaders have invited Pakistani investors to look into opportunities available in the energy and power sectors of Jordan. In June 2006, an initiation for the process of negotiations in concluding Free Trade Agreement and Protection and Promotion of Investments was scheduled and set during the 8th session of the Pak-Jordan Joint Ministerial Commission. During the session, discussions were also made on matters regarding the overall amount of cooperation in agriculture, science and technology as well as other areas.

== High-level visits ==
=== Notable visits ===
- On **8–9 February 2018**, His Majesty King Abdullah II of Jordan visited Pakistan. He met the President and the Prime Minister; both sides reviewed bilateral relations and signed MoUs relating to civil defence and housing cooperation.
- On **2 November 2007**, King Abdullah II visited Islamabad for talks with President Pervez Musharraf, focusing on bilateral and regional issues.
- On **15–16 November 2025**, King Abdullah II undertook a major state visit to Pakistan — the first such visit in over two decades. He was received by President Asif Ali Zardari and Prime Minister Shehbaz Sharif. The programme included:
  - A ceremonial reception
  - High-level political meetings
  - A special investiture ceremony
  - A visit to GIDS (Global Industrial & Defence Solutions)
  - Observing a military demonstration at the Tilla Range
- In **early November 2025**, Pakistan’s Chief of Army Staff, **General Syed Asim Munir**, undertook an official visit to Jordan. He held meetings with His Majesty King Abdullah II and senior military leadership. Discussions focused on counter-terrorism, defence-industrial cooperation, and expanding joint training.

=== Other significant exchanges (2023–2025) ===
- In **April 2025**, the 28th session of the Pakistan–Jordan Defence Collaboration Committee was held in Amman.
- In **December 2023**, the Chairman Joint Chiefs of Staff Committee of Pakistan visited Jordan for defence consultations.
- In **February 2025**, Pakistan’s Minister for IT & Telecommunication attended the Digital Cooperation Organization General Assembly in Jordan.
- In **September 2025**, Pakistan’s Minister for Investment visited Jordan for the “Invest in Digital Economy Forum”.
- In **October 2025**, Pakistan’s Minister of State for National Health Services visited Amman to attend the 8th Islamic Conference of Health Ministers.

High-level bilateral visits typically strengthen cooperation in defence, trade, investment, humanitarian coordination, and multilateral diplomacy.

== Multilateral cooperation ==
Pakistan and Jordan cooperate in various international and regional organisations, including:

- Organisation of Islamic Cooperation (OIC)
- United Nations
- UN peacekeeping missions
- Humanitarian and refugee-support initiatives

Both states contribute to global peacekeeping, with Pakistan being one of the largest troop contributors and Jordan providing specialised units.

== Resident diplomatic missions ==
- Jordan has an embassy in Islamabad.
- Pakistan has an embassy in Amman.

== See also ==
- Foreign relations of Jordan
- Foreign relations of Pakistan
- Pakistanis in Jordan
- Princess Sarvath El Hassan
