= List of violent incidents in Pakistan (2006–2009) =

This is a list of violent incidents in Pakistan from 2006 to 2009. Violence increased in 2006, in part because the US/NATO strategy from 2005 of attacking the Taliban in their stronghold in South Afghanistan (including Helmand), lead to incidents on the Pakistani side of the border.

#	Year	Mdth	Day	Type	Site	Killed	Injured	More; Information
1	2006	Jan.	13		Bajour	18		Main article: Damadola airstrike The official number of dead was 18, including eight men, five women and five children, but other reports indicate that as many as 25 people were killed. Fourteen of the dead were said to be from the same family.
1			25	Landmine	Dera Bugti District, Balochistan	<6'	5	A bus ran over a landmine.
2		Feb.	5	Suicidal	Kolpur, Kachi District, Balochistan	13	18	A blast on board a Lahore-bound bus en route from Quetta. Among the dead were three army personnel. No groups claimed of responsibility for the attack.
3			9	Sectarian	Pakistan and Afghanistan	36	100	Sectarian violence marred the holiest day of the Shiite calendar. The violence erupted with a suspected suicide attack on Shiites in Hangu, in the northwestern part of the country, as they celebrated Day of Ashura.
4		March	2	Suicidal	near the US Consulate in Karachi	4		A powerful car bomb attack in the high security zone. Among the killed was a killed was a US diplomat, a day before President George W. Bush was to reach Pakistan.
5			10	Landmine	Dera Bugti District, Balochistan	<26		Mostly women and children were killed in after their bus hit a landmine. Both tribal rebels and security forces planted land mines in the area.
6		April	11	Suicidal	Nishtar Park, Karachi	57	<80	Main article: Nishtar Park bombing A bomb explosion at a religious gathering celebrating the birthday of Muhammad. Among the dead were Sunni scholars.
7		June	12	Suicidal	Hotel in Quetta	<5	17	
8			15	Gun attack	Karachi	5	0	Unidentified gunmen killed a senior prison official Amanullah Khan Niazi and four others.
9			16	Gun attack	Khoga Chiri village in Orakzai Agency	4		Two female teachers and two children were shot dead.
10		July	14	Suicidal	Abbas Town	2		Allama Hassan Turabi, a Shiite religious scholar and chief of Tehrik-e-Jafaria Pakistan, and his 12-year-old nephew were killed in a suicide attack near his residence. The suicide bomber was later identified as Abdul Karim, a Bangladeshi-speaking, resident of a shantytown in the central city area of Karachi.
11		Aug.	26	Battle	Balochistan	<36		Tribal leader Nawab Akbar Bugti was killed in a battle between tribal militants and government forces. At least five soldiers and at least 30 rebels are thought to have died too.
12			26-31	Riots	Marriott hotel, Islamabad	6	Dozens	Akbar Bugti's killing sparked five days of rioting and the arrest of 700 people.
13		Sept.	8	Bomb	Rakhni bazaar area of Barkhan District, Balochistan|	<6	17	
14		Oct.	6	Sectarian	Orakzai Agency	17	5	Fighting between Sunni and Shia Muslims over a dispute over ownership of the shrine to 18th Century figure Syed Amir Anwar Shah shrine.
15			20	Bomb	Peshawar	6	21	The attack happened in a busy shopping district.
2		Oct.	30		Chenagai, Bajour	80		Main article: Chenagai airstrike Between 70 and 80 were killed, when a madrassa school was hit by four to five missiles. The school was filled with local students who had resumed studies after the Eid ul-Fitr holiday.
16		Nov.	8	Suicidal	Dargai	42	20	Main article: 2006 Dargai bombing All the victims were from the Pakistani Army. The attack was apparently retaliation for the Chenagai airstrike which killed 80 people in the same Bajaur region in the previous month.
17	2007	Jan.	15	Bomb	Jalozai refugee camp	4	5	The powerful blast destroyed a mud-house.
18			26	Suicidal	Marriott hotel, Islamabad	2	5	The bomber and a security guard were killed in the blast.
19			27	Suicidal	Shiite mosque in Peshawar	42	60	Among the victims were Chief of Peshawar City Police Malik Saad. About 2,000 Shiite Muslims were in and around the mosque, police said.
20		Feb.	6	Suicidal	Miranshah, North Waziristan		5	A suicide bomber detonated his explosives in a parking area outside Islamabad International Airport.
21			17	Suicidal	Inside a courtroom in Quetta, Balochistan	15	24	A suicide bomber blew himself up.
22			20	Assassination	Gujranwala	1		Punjab Minister for social welfare Zil-e-Huma Usman was shot and killed. Her assassin, Mohammed Sarwar, was reported to have been motivated by her refusal to abide by the Islamic code of dress and a dislike for the involvement of women in political affairs.
23		March	19-22	Clashes	Waziristan region	135		Clashes between pro-government forces under Maulvi Nazir and Al-Qaeda remnants. A ceasefire is declared after four days of fighting enforced by officials from both sides.
24		April	10-11	Sectarian	different areas of the Kurram Agency	35	'Scores'	'Heavy fighting between rival Shia and Sunni
3			26		Saidgi village in North Waziristan	4		
25			28	Assassination attempt	Place?	23	27	Aftab Ahmad Sherpao, who is the Interior minister that killed 28 people in Charsadda, Khyber Pakhtunkhwa was the target. This time again an attempt on a high-ranking officer of Pakistani government was unsuccessful.
26		May	12	Riots	Karachi	50	Hundreds	Main article: 2007 Karachi riots Party workers of opposing parties; MQM, ANP and PPP clash. The riots started when rival political rallies take the same route amid lawyers protests for restoration of Iftikhar Muhammad Chaudhry as the Chief Justice of Supreme Court.
27			15	Suicidal	The Marhaba hotel, Peshawar	<24	30	The hotel is popular with Afghans in Peshawar, where militants opposed to government support for the United States, previously have launched attacks.
28		June	2	Roadside bomb	Dara Khwar, Bajaur Agency	5		A tribal chief, a political tehsildar and a journalist were killed.
29			8	Bomb	Hub, Balochistan	3	7	A bomb exploded on a bus. The coach was heading from Lasbela to Karachi.
4			19		Datakhel area of North Waziristan	<22	10	A missile hit a cluster of compounds.
5			23	18 artillery shells and six missiles	Mangrotai area of the North Waziristan	11	10	The ordnance, fired from Afghanistan, hit residential compounds and a hotel. The dead included two children and a woman.
1		July	3-11	Confrontation	Lal Masjid, Islamabad	95	44	Main article: Siege of Lal Masjid A confrontation between Islamic militants and the government of Pakistan, centered around the Lal Masjid ("Red Mosque") and Jamia Hafsa madrasah complex in Islamabad.
30			6	Assassination attempt	Rawalpindi			President General Pervez Musharraf escaped yet another attempt on his life when around 36 rounds fired at his aircraft from a submachine gun. In another incident, four Pakistan Army troops, including a major and a lieutenant, were killed in an improvised explosive device attack on a military convoy in Dir District – a stronghold of the Jamaat-e-Islami and the banned Tehreek-e-Nafaz-e-Shariat-e-Mohammadi.
31			8	Gun attack	Near Peshawar	3	1	Unidentified gunmen killed three Chinese workers and wounded another in what Pakistani officials said was a terrorist attack apparently linked to the bloody siege of militants at an Islamabad mosque.
32			12	Suicidal (2), blast & Rocket attack	Three tribal regions and Swat District, Khyber Pakhtunkhwa	7	28	Three police officers among the dead.
33			14	Suicidal	Miranshah, North Waziristan	23	27	A suicide bomber rammed an explosives-packed car into a convoy carrying paramilitary troops in one of the deadliest attacks on the security forces in North Waziristan.
34			15	Suicidal and bombs	Throughout Khyber Pakhtunkhwa	49	Hundreds	11 security personnel and six civilians were killed and 47 others injured in Matta, Swat District, when suicide bombers smashed two cars packed with explosives into an army convoy, and 25 people were killed and 61 injured when a suicide bomber blew himself up in the Dera Ismail Khan police recruitment center. It was apparently retaliations for the Lal Masjid operation.
35			17	Suicidal	Outside the venue of the district bar council convention in Islamabad|	17	50	A suicide bomber blew himself up killing mostly PPP political workers waiting for the arrival of Chief Justice Iftikhar Muhammad Chaudhry, who was to address a lawyers convention.
36			19	Suicidal & bombs	Kohat, Hub and Hangu	<40	28	More than 40 people were killed in three separate bomb attacks. 1) A bomb was detonated in a mosque used by military personnel in the north-western town of Kohat, killing at least 11 people. 2) 26 people died and 50 were injured in the southern town of Hub, Lasbela District, Balochistan, in an attack apparently targeting Chinese workers. 3) At least seven people were killed and more than 20 injured in a suicide car bombing at a police academy in the north-western town of Hangu.
37			24	Rocket attack	Bannu	9	40	Unidentified militants fired a barrage of rockets on the civilian population.
38			27	Suicidal	Muzaffar hotel in Aabpara, Islamabad	<13	28	The attack happened after hundreds of stone-throwing protesters clashed with police as the capital's Red Mosque reopened for the first time since the bloody army raid. The same day Raziq Bugti, former guerrilla commander turned spokesman for the Balochistan government, was shot dead by assailants in Quetta.
39		Aug.	2	Suicidal	Sargodha	2		Police shot dead a suspected suicide bomber after the man failed to detonate the explosives he was wearing. The man, who entered a police training center, killed a policeman before he was gunned down.
40			4	Suicidal	Parachinar, Kurram Agency	9	43	The attack happened at a busy bus station.
2		J	7 -Feb. 28, 2009	Battle	Bajaur	<2023	4000	Main article: Battle of Bajaur A military offensive launched by Pakistani troops against Taliban tribal forces. The Bajaur area had been under Taliban control since early 2007, and was said to be Al-Qaeda's main command and control hub for operations in Northeast Afghanistan. including Kunar province. On February 28, 2009, the Pakistan Army finally defeated the Taliban and other Islamist militants in Bajaur.
41			26	Suicidal	Machaar area of Shangla District	4	2	All victims were police officers.
42		Sept.	4	Suicidal (2)	Rawalpindi cantonment	25	66	Main article: September 2007 bombings in Rawalpindi The attacks happened during morning rush hour. The first blast took place near Qasim Market where a Defence Ministry bus carrying around 38 civilians and uniformed officials was hit, killing 18 people. Five minutes later, a second blast took place near RA Bazaar, behind General Headquarters. The blast was caused by explosives fixed to a motorcycle, which blew up killing seven people on the spot.
43			11	Suicidal	Bannu Adda, Dera Ismail Khan district	17	16	A 15-year-old suicide bomber blew himself up in a passenger van. The same day Omar Ayub Khan's protocol officer, Liaquat Hussain, was found shot dead near the Northern Bypass in Karachi.
44			13	Suicidal	army officers' mess in Tarbela Ghazi, Haripur near Tarbela Dam	20	11	All the victims were off-duty commandos from Pakistan Army's special forces unit SSG's Karar Company.
45			15	Assassination	Peshawar	2		Unidentified assailants shot dead Jamiat Ulema-e-Islam leader and Wafaqul Madaris Vice Chairman Maulana Hassan Jan. Hassan, a former MNA, also issued a fatwa against suicide attacks, and he along with a group of Pakistani clerics traveled to Afghanistan in 2001 to convince Mullah Omar that he should expel Osama bin Laden from Afghanistan to avoid American attacks.
46		Oct.	1	Suicidal	Bannu, Khyber Pakhtunkhwa	<16	29	A suicide bomber disguised in a woman's burqa blew himself up at a busy police checkpost. Four police officers among the dead.
3			7-10	Battle	Near Mir Ali, North Waziristan	257	120	Main article: Battle of Mir Ali Clashes broke out after militants set off improvised explosive devices and conducted ambushes on a Pakistani convoy. The army says the casualties were militants and soldiers but local people reported at least ten civilians were among the dead. Hundreds of people fled Mir Ali after more than 50 houses were damaged in the fighting.
47			12	Execution	Mohmand	25	35	Taliban publicly behead six "criminals" and lashed three others in the name of Sharia.
48			18	Suicidal	Karachi	139	450	Main article: 2007 Karachi bombing Attack on Benazir Bhutto convoy killed over 139 in Karachi and left more than 450 injured in one of the most deadliest terrorist attacks in Pakistan. Former PM Benazir Bhutto was returning after 8 years of self-imposed exile when the bomber struck the convoy. Karachi Bombs in Pictures
49			20	Bomb	Dera Bugti, Balochistan	<8	28	A powerful bomb planted in a pickup vehicle.
4			25- Dec.8	Battle	Swat	438		Main article: First Battle of Swat The Pakistani Army and Islamic militants fought for control of the Swat District. The battle was won by the Pakistani army, but Taliban militants slowly re-entered Swat over the coming months and started engaging security forces in battles that lasted throughout 2008. By early February 2009, the Taliban had managed to regain control of most of Swat and at least 80 percent of the district was under their control.
50			25	Suicidal	Swat District	<20	35	A blast aimed at a vehicle carrying Frontier Constabulary (FC) personnel kills 18 troops.
51			30	Suicidal	A police checkpoint in the high security zone of Rawalpindi	7	31	Less than a kilometer from President General Pervez Musharraf's camp office. 3 policeofficers among the dead. The blast splattered check post of General Tariq Majid, current Chairman of Joint Chiefs of Staff's residence.
52		Nov.	1	Suicidal	Faisalabad Road, near Sargodha	7	28	A suicide bomber rammed his motorcycle into a PAF bus. Seven officers of the Pakistan Air Force stationed at Mushaf Airbase among the dead. It is significant that after this event a state of emergency was imposed on the country.
6			2		North Waziristan.	5		The attack happened in a Madrasah
53			9	Suicidal	Peshawar	3	2	A suicide bomber killed at least three people and injured two others when he detonated explosives at the house of Federal Political Affairs Minister and PML-Q provincial president Amir Muqam. The minister was unhurt, but a cousin of his was injured. The three dead were policemen guarding the house.
54			17-19	Sectarian	Parachinar, Kurram Agency	94	168	Three days of in-fighting between rival Sunni and Shia sects. Only by the fourth day, the army gained control of the area and a ceasefire was maintained in the area.
55			24	Suicidal (2)	Rawalpindi	30		1) A suicide bomber rammed his car into a 72-seater bus parked in front of Ojhri Camp on Murree Road carrying Inter-Services Intelligence officials to work, killing 28 officials and a bystander. 2) A second suicide bomber attempted to enter the General Headquarters (GHQ). Upon being asked for identification at the GHQ's check post, he blew himself up, resulting in the deaths of one security official and a bystander.
56		Dec.	9	Suicidal	Near Matta, Swat District	10		Three policeofficers and seven civilians, including two children, perished in a car bombing.
57			10	Suicidal	Near Minhas Airbase, Kamra	0	7	Attack on the school bus carrying children during the morning rush injuring seven of them. It was a PAF employees bus. It was a second major attack on the Pakistan Air Force after the Sargodha attack.
58			13	Suicidal (2)	Quetta	7	35	Two suicide bombings near an army checkpost Three personnel from the Pakistan Army among the dead.
59			15	Suicidal	Nowshera	5	11	Explosives-laden bicycle rammed into a military checkpost. First-ever suicide attack in the city of Nowshera. The attack occurred at a checkpoint near the gate of an army school.
60			17	Suicidal	[restitive city of] Kohat, Khyber Pakhtunkhwa	12	5	The victims were members of the army's local football team.
61			21	Suicidal	Jamia Masjid Sherpao, in Charsadda District	57	100	On the eve of Eid ul-Adha, a suicide bomb blast again targeted Aftab Ahmad Sherpao. Aftab Sherpao survived the blast, but his younger son Mustafa Khan Sherpao, was injured.
62			23	Suicidal	Near Mingora	7	23	A suicide bomber targeted an army convoy. One soldier among the dead.
63			27	Assassination	Liaquat Bagh, Rawalpindi	21	Many	Main article: Assassination of Benazir Bhutto Two-time Prime Minister Benazir Bhutto is assassinated in a shooting and suicide bombing. The site is notorious as the place where former Prime Minister Liaquat Ali Khan was also assassinated in October 1951.
64			28	Violence	Nationwide	33		Violence ensues all over Pakistan following the assassination of former prime minister Benazir Bhutto. The situation grew so bad that Sindh Rangers were given orders to shoot-at-sight. Four policeofficers among the dead.
65			28	Roadside bomb	in Swat District.	9		Among the dead are former PML-Q minister Miangul Asfandyar Amir zeb, who was the grandson of the former ruler of the Swat (princely state).
66	2008	Jan.	10	Suicidal	Lahore High Court, Lahore	24	73	Policemen deliberately targeted outside Lahore High Court before the scheduled lawyer's protest against the government in provincial capital of Lahore. This attack was first of its kind in Lahore since the start of War on Terrorism.
67			14	Bomb	Karachi	10	50	The bomb was planted on a bicycle and it went off during wee hours in a vegetable market.
5			15-16	Gun attack	South Waziristan	<30		Several dozen Islamic militants overran a paramilitary fort in South Waziristan, Pakistan, killing or kidnapping many troops. The capture of Sararogha Fort represented the first time the militants managed to isolate and capture a strongly defended government position since October 2007, when they seized several isolated police stations and small military posts in Swat valley
68			17	Suicidal	Mirza Qasim Baig Imambargah in Mohalla Janghi, Kohati, Peshawar	12	25	
7		Jan.	29		North Waziristan	1		Abu Laith al-Libi killed.
69		Febr.	4	Suicidal	Army Medical College, near the General Headquarters in Rawalpindi	10	27	A suicide bomber crashed his bike into an armed forces bus carrying students and officials.
70			9	Bomb	Charsadda in the north-western Pakistan.	25	35	Main article: 2008 Charsadda bombing A powerful explosion hit an opposition election rally in The attack targeted ANP, a secular party, one of whose leaders, Fazal-ur-Rehman Atakhail, was assassinated February 7 in Karachi triggering widespread protests.
71			11	Suicidal	Miranshah, North Waziristan	12	25	A suicide attack on a public meeting in left at least eight people dead and a dozen wounded, including a candidate for the National Assembly. It was the second attack on ANP's election gathering in two days.
72			16	Suicidal	Parachinar, Kurram Agency in northwestern Pakistan.	47	150	Main article: 2008 Parachinar bombing An explosive-laden vehicle is rammed into the election meeting of Pakistan Peoples Party, the party of the slain former Prime Minister Benazir Bhutto. It was the fourth such attack on PPP's political workers within a year; two of them targeting the former PPP leader Benazir Bhutto.
73			18	Violence	Nationwide	24	200	Election-related on the eve of Pakistani general election, Aaj TV reported.
74			22	Roadside bomb	near the town of Matta, Swat District, Khyber Pakhtunkhwa	13	~12	An army spokesman said the bomb had been detonated by remote control. Women and children were among the casualties.
75			25	Suicidal	Near Army General Headquarters in Rawalpindi.	8	20	The Pakistan Army's top medic Lt Gen Mushtaq Baig was killed, along with the driver and security guard, when a suicide attack ripped apart the vehicle he was traveling in at 2:45pm local time. Gen Baig was the highest-ranking officer to be killed in Pakistan since the 9/11 attacks.
8			28		South Waziristan	13		
77			29	Suicidal	Mingora, Swat District	38	75	The attack happened during the funeral of a senior police officer who had been killed hours earlier in Lakki Marwat in the southern part of Khyber Pakhtunkhwa. The police DSP was killed along with three other policemen when their vehicle was hit in a roadside bomb earlier in the day.
78		March	2	Suicidal	Darra Adam Khel, a few miles south of Peshawar	42	58	A bomber struck the meeting of tribal elders and local officials. The town of Darra was the center of violent clashes earlier in January when the militants took over the Kohat Tunnel that connected Peshawar with Kohat. After the onslaught of security forces to take back the tunnel, the fighting resulted in the deaths of 13 troops and 70 militants.
79			4	Suicidal	parking area of the Pakistan Navy War College, Lahore.	8	24	Two suicide bombers blew themselves up. It was the first time a Pakistani naval institution was targeted by the militants (Army has been targeted at least eight times outside the war zone and Air Force twice) since the ongoing War on Terrorism in Pakistan in general and post-Lal Masjid siege in particular.
80			11	Suicidal	Lahore	24	200	Two suicide bombings. One of the attacks ripped apart Federal Investigation Agency building killing 21, including 16 policemen. The other one hit the posh locality of Model Town, exploding close to Bilawal House, associated with PPP leaders Benazir Bhutto and her husband Asif Ali Zardari.
81			15	Bomb	A restaurant in Islamabad	1	10	A bomb was hurled over a wall surrounding the restaurant. Four of the 12 people wounded in the bombing were U.S. FBI agents. In addition to wounding the agents, the explosion killed a Turkish woman and wounded a fifth American, three Pakistanis, a person from the United Kingdom and someone from Japan.
9			16		South Waziristan	9	9	3 bombs dropped by a United States aircraft killed nine people and wounded nine others in the tribal area. The bombs hit a mud compound in Wana, killing an Arab of Middle Eastern origin, two men from Turkmenistan and six Pakistanis from outside the tribal area. However, the attack missed its target, a senior Al Qaeda official.
82		April	9	Riots	Karachi	9	Many	Riots after two groups of lawyers scuffle that begin after PML-Q leaders, former CM Sindh Arbab Ghulam Rahim and former federal minister Sher Afgan Niazi are maltreated ahead of government formation in the provinces of Sindh and Punjab.
83			17	Clashes	Khyber Agency	20	dozens	Clashes between two belligerent factions.
84		May	6	Suicidal	Bannu	4		
85			18	Bomb	The Army's Punjab Regimental Center market in the city of Mardan	13	20	This was the second attack in Mardan in a month after a car bomb on April 25 killed three and injured 26 people.
86			19	Remote-controlled bomb	Mamond Tehsil of Bajaur Agency.	4	2	A blast outside a mosque.
10			21		South Waziristan	6		
87			26	Sectarian violence	Dera Ismail Khan	7	5	
88		June	2	Suicidal	Islamabad	6		Main article: 2008 Danish embassy bombing The Danish embassy in Islamabad is attacked with a car bomb killing six people. A post purportedly from Al-Qaeda's Mustafa Abu al-Yazid appears on the Internet a day after the attack claiming responsibility. The statement mentions the publication of "insulting drawings" and the refusal to "apologize for publishing them" referring to the Jyllands-Posten Muhammad cartoons controversy.
89			9	Remote-controlled bomb	Dera Ismail Khan		4	Sufi Muhammad, leader of the TNSM, survived. Four policemen got injured.
11			10		South Waziristan	19		Main article: Gora Prai airstrike 10 Pakistani Para Military Soldiers and 1 Regular Army Major killed, 8 Taliban militants killed
90			26	Bomb	Dera Ismail Khan	4	2	A blast inside a Shia mosque.
91		July	6	Suicidal	Islamabad	19		Main article: 2008 Lal Masjid bombing Attack targeting policemen deployed at a rally observing the first anniversary of an army raid on the Islamabad's Lal Masjid
92			7	Bombs	Karachi		<37	A string of small explosions, apparently from bombs, wounded at least 37 people, rattling Pakistan a day after a deadly suicide attack in capital of Pakistan.
12			28		South Waziristan	6		Midhat Mursi and 5 other Al-Qaeda operatives killed.
93		Aug.	2	Remote-controlled bomb	Mingora, Swat	8		At least eight police and security workers were killed when a remote-controlled bomb exploded near their vehicle.
94		Aug.	4	Fighting	Swat Valley	136		After a week of fighting between the security forces and pro-Taliban militants, the casualties included at least 94 militants, 14 soldiers and around 28 civilians.
95			9	Gun attack	Kingargalai, Buner District	8		Militants stormed a police post killing eight policemen.
96			12	Bomb	A major road near the center of Peshawar	13	11	A bomb targeting a Pakistani Air Force bus carrying personnel from a military base killed 13 people and wounded 11 others on Tuesday. Taliban forces reportedly took responsibility. The attack was seen as retaliation for Pakistani airstrikes in Bajaur Agency, a militant stronghold near the border with Afghanistan. Five of the dead were air force personnel and the eight others were bystanders.
97			13	Suicidal	Lahore	8	20	Two policemen were killed and over 20, including 12 policemen, were injured after an alleged suicide bomber blew himself up near a police station in Lahore on the eve of Independence Day celebrations.
98			13	Explosions, handgrenate attacks	Hub, Uthal, Panjgur, Kharan and Turbat towns in Balochistan	6	19	Four policemen were injured in explosions, there was a hand-grenade attack in Panjgur and shooting incidents in Balochistan, while leader of the banned outfit Amr Bil Maroof Wa Nahi Anil Munkar Haji Namdar was shot dead when he was delivering sermon in Bara tehsil. Haji Namdar had earlier escaped a suicide attack on 1 May 2008 in which 17 people were injured.
99			7-18	Sectarian	Kurram Agency	287	372	Clashes mainly between the Toori and Bangash tribes, but which involved other local tribes, in 12 consecutive days of fighting. In the later incidents, pro-Taliban militants were involved too, after which the local tribesmen asked the government to flush out the militants.
100			19	Suicidal	District Headquarters Hospital in Dera Ismail Khan	32	55	Main article: 2008 Dera Ismail Khan suicide bombing Seven policemen and two health officials were among the killed. Tehrik-i-Taliban Pakistan claimed responsibility for the attack.
101			21	Suicidal	Pakistan Ordnance Factories, Wah Cantt	70	67	Main article: 2008 Wah bombing 2 suicidebombers blew themselves up outside the gates of the state run factories. Tehrik-i-Taliban Pakistan claimed responsibility for the attack.
102			21	Assassination	Ningulai, Tehsil Kabal, Swat District	5	1	Main article: Haji Musa Khan An influential person of Ningulai, Haji Musa Khan, was shot dead by unidentified assailants as soon as he stepped out of the mosque after prayers. His guards opened fire but the assailants managed to escape. Haji Musa Khan had escaped a bomb and a gun attack in recent past. Tehrik-i-Taliban Pakistan claimed responsibility for the killing and accused the tribal elder of being an active supporter of security forces.
13			23		South Waziristan	10		
102			23	Suicidal	Charbagh Tehsil, Swat valley	20		Main article: 23 August 2008 Swat Valley bombing An explosive-laden car rams into a police station. Tehrik-i-Taliban Pakistan claimed responsibility for the attack.
103			25	Rocket attack	Swat valley	10		Attack targeting the house of a local member of provincial assembly (MPA). As a result of the attack, ANP MPA Waqar Ahmed's brother and other family members were killed.
104			26	Bomb	Model Town area on the outskirts of Islamabad	8	20	A bomb explosion at a roadside restaurant.
105			28	Bomb	Bannu area, Khyber Pakhtunkhwa	9	15	An attack targeting a police van.
14			31		South Waziristan	10		
15		Sept.	3		South Waziristan	23		Main article: Angoor Ada raid
16			4		North Waziristan	4		
17			5		North Waziristan	5		
106			6	Suicidal	20 km from Peshawar	30	70	Main article: September 2008 Peshawar bombing Attack against a paramilitary checkpoint. The attack came during the voting to elect Asif Ali Zardari as the President of Pakistan and the marking of Defence Day.
18			8		North Waziristan	23		Main article: Daande Darpkhel airstrike
107			10	grenade-and-gun attack	Maskanai area of Lower Dir District, Khyber Pakhtunkhwa	25	50	In a mosque
19			12		North Waziristan	12		Main article: Miranshah airstrike
20			15		South Waziristan			Main article: Pakistan-U.S. Standoff 15 September 2008
21			17		South Waziristan	5		Main article: Baghar Cheena airstrike
108			19	Bomb	Quetta	5	8	Islamic religious school run by Jamiat Ulema-e-Islam
109			20	Suicidal	Islamabad	57	266	Main article: Islamabad Marriott Hotel bombing
22			21		North Waziristan			Main article: Lowara Mandi Repel
110			22	Suicidal	Swat	9		A checkpost
23			25		Tanai region			Main article: Tanai border repel
111			26	Bomb	Near city of Bahawalpur	3	15	Bomb on railway track derails passenger train.
24		Oct.	1		"Border-area"	6		
112			2	Suicidal	Walibagh, Charsadda	6		
113			6	Suicidal	Bhakkar, Punjab	20	60	
25			9		Tappi, North Waziristan	8		
114			9	Suicidal	Islamabad	8	8	Main Police Headquarters List of terrorist incidents in Pakistan since 2001#2008
115			10	Suicidal	Adazai, Orakzai Agency	110	200	Main article: 10 October 2008 Orakzai bombing
116			13	Suicidal	Khyber Pakhtunkhwa		5	
26			16		Taparghai, South Waziristan	1		
117			16	Suicidal	Mingora, Swat	4		
118			19	Suicidal	Dera Bugti district, Balochistan	3	6	
27			22		Taparghai, South Waziristan	4		
28			26		South Waziristan	20		
119			26	Suicidal	Ghalaanai, Mohmand Agency	11	5	
120			27	Suicidal	Ghalaanai, Quetta	2	12	Near the District Court Complex
121			31	Suicidal	Mardan, Khyber Pakhtunkhwa	8	20	
122		Nov.	2	Suicidal	Wana, South Waziristan	8		Security checkpost
123			4	Suicidal	Hangu District	7	6	Security checkpost
124			6	Suicidal	Bajaur Agency	22	45	At a Salarzai jirga
125			11	Suicidal	Qayyum Stadium in Peshawar	4	13	Khyber Pakhtunkhwa Governor Owais Ahmed Ghani had just left the venue and senior provincial minister Bashir Bilour was on his way out.
126			12	Suicidal	Charsadda District	7	15	Explosives-filled bus into the gates of a school
29			14		Miranshah, North Waziristan	12		
127			17	Suicidal	Khawazakhela area, Swat	>3		
128			19	Assassination	Islamabad	2		Former head of the army's elite commando force Special Service Group, Maj-Gen (R) Ameer Faisal Alavi, who commanded the SSG during the first major assault on militants in South Waziristan in 2004 and his driver gunned down.
129			20	Suicidal	Mamoond tehsil of Bajaur Agency	>9	4	
130			21	Suicidal	Dera Ismail Khan	7	17	During the funeral of a cleric near the bus stand.
30			22		North Waziristan	5		
131			28	Suicidal	Peshawar-Bannu Road in Domel area of Bannu	9	16	Explosive-laden rams a police vehicle. 4 police officers among the dead.
132		Dec.	1	Suicidal	7 kilometers north-east of Mingora	10	49	Explosive-laden truck near the Sangota security post.
133			5	Bombs	Peshwar and Orakzai	27	50	Main article: 5 December 2008 Peshawar bombing Two bombs exploded in crowded markets.
31			22		South Waziristan	<8		Two vehicles hit at different locations. Most of those on board killed.
32			22		Kari Khel, 8 km from Wana, South Waziristan	7		
134			28	Suicidal	Buner District	36	16	Near a polling station in a government school, believed to have been carried out to disrupt the by-election for a National Assembly seat.
33	2009	Jan.	1			3		2 senior Al-Qaeda leaders Usama al-Kini & Sheikh Ahmed Salim Swedan killed
135			4	Suicidal	Government Polytechnic College, Multan Road in Dera Ismail Khan.	7	25	3 police officers and 2 journalist among the dead. Most of the injured policemen.
136			10	Gunbattle	Hangu	27	Several	Rival sects fight for 2 days
34			23		Waziristan	14		
137			26	Bomb	Dera Ismail Khan	5	Several	Bomb attached to a bicycle went off on a busy main road.
138			26	Assassination	Quetta	1	Several	Hussain Ali Yousafi, chairman of the Hazara Democratic Party, was shot dead by Lashkar-e-Jhangvi
139		Feb.	3	Hand grenade attack	Mohallah Joginwala in Dera Ismail Khan	1	18	At a Sunni mosque.
140			5	Suicidal	Al Hussainia Mosque, Dera Ghazi Khan	32		A crowd of Shia worshippers shortly before a religious gathering.
141			7	Gunbattle	Mianwali in Punjab, near Khyber Pakhtunkhwa	7		All killed were policeofficers at a checkpoint.
142			11	Remote controlled bomb	Dalazak Road in Peshawar	1	11	Bomb fitted to motorbike parked near the residence of Awami National Party (ANP) provincial lawmaker Alam Zeb Khan. This was the sixth such attack on ANP in less than a year.
35		Feb.	14		Makeen in South Waziristan	<30		
36			16		Waziristan	14		
143			17	Bomb	Bazidkhel-suburb near Peshawar	3	Several	Outside the home of a government official. He survived but several people were hurt.
144			20	Suicidal	Dera Ismail Khan	30	157	A funeral of Shia leader Sher Zaman – who was gunned down a day earlier. A curfew was imposed in Dera Ismail Khan and the army called in to quell riots immediately. Witnesses said police 'ran off' when gunfire broke out after the blast.
37		March	1		Sararogha village in South Waziristan	14		
145			2	Suicidal	Pishin District, Balochistan	4	12	At a girls' religious school.
146			3	Gunattack	Gaddafi Stadium in Lahore.	8	6	Main article: 2009 attack on the Sri Lanka national cricket team 6 policeofficers killed when a convoy carrying Sri Lankan cricketers and officials in two buses was fired upon by 12 gunmen.
147			5	Handgrenade	Ameer Hamza mosque, Dera Ismail Khan	1	19	
148			5	4 Bombs	Peshawar	0	0	The mausoleum of the most-revered mystic poet of the Pakhtun land Rahman Baba blown up.
149			7	Bomb	Peshawar	8	5	Seven policeoficers killed. In a separate incident, a roadside bomb killed three civilians and wounded four troops in the town of Darra Adam Khel.
150			11	Assassination	Namak Mandi, Peshawar	6	4	Khyber Pakhtunkhwa Senior Minister and Awami National Party leader Bashir Bilour survived the firing, grenade attack and suicide blast. This was the second assassination attempt on Bilour in less than six months and seventh suicide attack on ANP in little over a year.
38			12		Berju in Kurram Agency	24		
39			15		Jani Khel in Bannu district, Khyber Pakhtunkhwa	4		
151			16	Suicidal	Busiest busstand, (Pirwadhai) of Rawalpindi	14	17	
152			18	Gun attack	University of Malakand, Chakdara, Lower Dir District	5	4'	3 police officers among the dead when over 100 unidentified armed men attacked a police vehicle at the entrance.
153			23	Suicidal	Islamabad	1	3	A security official killed and three others injured outside a police Special Branch office.
40			25		Makin area of South Waziristan	7		2 vehicles by two missiles
41			26		Essokhel area in North Waziristan	4		
154			26	Suicidal	Near Jandola, South Waziristan	10	25	At a restaurant targeting opponents of Tehreek-e-Taliban Pakistan chief Baitullah Mehsud
155			27	Suicidal	Peshawar-Torkham Highway in Jamrud, Khyber Agency	75	100	Main article: 2009 Jamrud mosque bombing At a mosque at during the Friday congregation. Intelligence sources put the number of dead at 86 but officials of the political administration were conservative by putting the death toll at 50.
156			30	Gun & grenade attack	Manawan Police Training School in Lahore near the border with India	9	93	Main article: 2009 Lahore police academy attacks At least eight police recruits killed by 10 terrorists. Security forces regained control of the facility in an operation that lasted for more than eight hours.
42		April	1		Orakzai Agency	14		
157			4	Suicidal	Margalla Road, Islamabad	<10	12	Main article: 2009 Islamabad Frontier Corps post attack A camp of the Frontier Constabulary (FC) attacked. At least eight FC personnel killed.
158			5	Suicidal	an Imambargah in Chakwal	22	60	Main article: 2009 Chakwal mosque bombing At the gates of a Shia mosque where some 1,200 people were attending a religious gathering.
159			6	Killing	Shinkiari area of Mansehra District	4	3	Police found bullet-riddled bodies of four local aid workers, including three women, in on Monday.
43			8		Gangi Khel in South Waziristan	4		
160			15	Suicidal	Charsadda, near Peshawar.	9	5	A security attacked killing nine policeofficers and injuring five others.
161			18	Suicidal	Doaba area of Hangu	22	15	A checkpoint killing five security personnel.
44			19		South Waziristan	<3	5	
162			26	Tragedy	Lower Dir District	12		12 children were killed after playing with a bomb they mistook for a football.
45			29		Kanni Garam village in South Waziristan	6		
163			29	Targeted killings	Karachi	34	40	Unidentified gunmen in a matter of hours in different parts of the city. In the month-long incidents of violence until April 28, the police record showed that 16 people had been shot dead and 54 wounded in different incidents of targeted killings. The statistics further showed that of the total number of people, 43 people belonged to the Pakhtun community while seven happened to be Urdu-speaking people.
164		May	5	Suicidal	Peshawar-Bara road 12 km west of Peshawar Cantonment	7	48	An explosives-laden car rammed into a pick-up near a checkpost
46			9		Sararogha, South Waziristan	6		strike in kills 6 militants.
165		May	11	Suicidal	Outskirts of Darra Adam Khel	8	27	Explosives-laden vehicle near an FC checkpost.
47			12		Sra Khawra village in South Waziristan	8		
48			16		Sarkai Naki village, North Waziristan	25		
166			16	Bombs	Peshawar	13	34	A powerful car-bomb in the Barisco area killed 12 people and wounded 31 others, including schoolchildren and women, while a low intensity device ripped through a garments store in the packed Gora Bazaar in Peshawar Saddar, killing a minor girl and injuring three others.
167			21	Suicidal	Frontier Corps (FC) fort, Jandola area, Tank District	9	25	Five security personnel were among the dead.
168			22	Car bomb	Cinema Road, Peshawar	10	75	The attack happened outside a cinema.
	Total					6545	9872	
6		April	26-	Battle (ongoing)	Buner, Lower Dir, Swat and Shangla districts	~800 (Army claim)	102	Main article: Operation Black Thunderstorm Operation Black Thunderstorm is an ongoing operation that commenced on April 26, conducted by the Pakistani Army, with the aim of retaking Buner, Lower Dir, Swat and Shangla districts from the Taliban after the militants took control of them since the start of the year
	TOTAL	May	25			7364	10074	

Clickable map. Some significant US strikes, battles involving the Pakistani army and other major incidents.
Numbers refers to the corresponding entries in the table below.

== See also ==
- War in North-West Pakistan
- Civilian casualties
- List of terrorist incidents in Pakistan since 2001
- Drone attacks in Pakistan by the United States
