= List of terrorist incidents in 2008 =

This is a timeline of incidents in 2008 that have been labelled as "terrorism" and are not believed to have been carried out by a government or its forces (see state terrorism and state-sponsored terrorism).

Number of terrorist incidents 2008

== Guidelines ==
- To be included, entries must be notable (have a stand-alone article) and described by a consensus of reliable sources as "terrorism".
- List entries must comply with the guidelines outlined in the manual of style under MOS:TERRORIST.
- Casualties figures in this list are the total casualties of the incident including immediate casualties and later casualties (such as people who succumbed to their wounds long after the attacks occurred).
- Casualties listed are the victims. Perpetrator casualties are listed separately (e.g. x (+y) indicate that x victims and y perpetrators were killed/injured).
- Casualty totals may be underestimated or unavailable due to a lack of information. A figure with a plus (+) sign indicates that at least that many people have died (e.g. 10+ indicates that at least 10 people have died) – the actual toll could be considerably higher. A figure with a plus (+) sign may also indicate that over that number of people are victims.
- If casualty figures are 20 or more, they will be shown in **bold**. In addition, figures for casualties more than 50 will also be **underlined**.
- Incidents are limited to one per location per day. If multiple attacks occur in the same place on the same day, they will be merged into a single incident.
- In addition to the guidelines above, the table also includes the following categories:

0 people were killed/injured by the incident.
1–19 people were killed/injured by the incident.
20–49 people were killed/injured by the incident.
50–99 people were killed/injured by the incident.
100+ people were killed/injured by the incident.

== January–April ==
Total incidents: 10

Date	Dead	Injured	Location	Description
3 January	5	110	Diyarbakır, Turkey	See 2008 Diyarbakır bombing
14 January	≈6	≈6	Kabul, Afghanistan	A suicide bomber killed six at the Kabul Serena Hotel.
16 January	30	65	Buttala, Sri Lanka	A civilian bus was bombed, and the fleeing passengers were gunned down and the fleeing gunmen also attacked farmers, killing at least 30 people. The Sri Lankan government claimed that the gunman belonged to LTTE.
18 January	4	4	Hadhramaut Governorate, Yemen	Gunmen opened fire on a group of tourists, killing two Belgian women, their Yemeni driver and a Yemeni man believed to be a tourist guide. Belgian tourist and a Yemeni were wounded in the incident. Al-Qaida suspected.
29 January	2	23	Thénia, Boumerdès Province, Algeria	Suicide bomber drove and detonated a vehicle on a police headquarters, killing several policemen. Al-Qaida suspected.
1 February	0	3	Nouakchott, Mauritania	Unidentified gunmen opened fire on Israel's embassy, wounding three French nationals
11 February	≈25	≈40	Balad, Iraq	Car bomb. See 2008 Balad bombing.
6 March	0	0	New York City, United States	A bomb exploded outside an empty military recruiting station in Times Square.
6 April	15	90	Weliveriya, Sri Lanka	See 2008 Weliveriya bombing
12 April	13	~200	Shiraz, Iran	A bomb exploded inside the Shohada Hosseiniyeh mosque at around 9 pm during a sermon by a cleric well known for criticism of Wahhabism and of the Baháʼí Faith. Tehran blamed Western-backed monarchists for the attack. On its website, a group called Anjoman-e Padeshahi-e Iran (API), or Soldiers of the Kingdom Assembly of Iran, claimed responsibility.

== May ==
Total incidents: 4

Date	Dead	Injured	Location	Description
2 May	~15	~55	Saada Governorate, Yemen	15 killed and 55 injured in a bombing at the Bin Salman mosque.
13 May	80	216	Jaipur, India	A simultaneous bomb blast at eight different sites, including a crowded shopping site and a Hanuman temple, a self-styled Indian Mujahideen, (a collaboration of LeT & SIMI) has claimed responsibility.
22 May	0	1	Exeter, United Kingdom	See 2008 Exeter bombing
28 May	3	5	Negele Boran, Ethiopia	A bomb blast at Kidane Mihret and Shuferoch hotel, Islamic militants suspected.

== June ==
Total incidents: 6

Date	Dead	Injured	Location	Description
2 June	~8	~30	Islamabad, Pakistan	A suicide car bombing blast occurred at around 1 pm local time outside the Danish embassy. Nearby buildings also suffered damage. The attack was thought to be the work of fundamentalist terrorists.
6 June	21	47	Moratuwa suburb of Colombo, Sri Lanka.	A roadside bomb blast targeted a crowded state-run commuter bus at about 7:35 am The government quickly placed blame upon LTTE. See 2008 Moratuwa bus bombing
6 June	2	20	Kandy district, Sri Lanka	The Sri Lankan government blamed LTTE militants for a bomb explosion that occurred aboard a commuter bus only a few hours after a similar attack near Colombo. See 2008 Polgolla bus bombing
9 June	12		Boumerdès Province, Algeria	Two explosions kill 13 in the town of Beni Amrane. Islamic militants suspected.
16 June	12	40+	Northern Province, Sri Lanka	Explosives in a motorcycle detonated in front of a police station in Vavuniya, killing 12 police and injuring 40, including children.
26 June	18	25	Al-Karmah, Al Anbar Governorate, Iraq	A suicide bomber attacked a meeting of tribal sheikhs. U.S. troops, who were in attendance, were among the injured. It is believed that AQI was behind the attack.

== July ==
Total incidents: 9

Date	Dead	Injured	Location	Description
6 July	11	~22	Islamabad, Pakistan	A suicide-bomber targeted a group of police officers near the Lal Masjid almost a year after a deadly siege and raid on the mosque.
7 July	58	150+	Kabul, Afghanistan	A suicide-bomber drove an explosives-laden automobile into the front gates of the Indian embassy.
9 July	3	3	Istanbul, Turkey	Four men, believed to be Turkish citizens, attacked the American consulate around 1100 local time. Three of the four began shooting and were soon met with police fire. The three gunmen, as well as three police officers, were killed in the exchange. The fourth assailant, the driver, escaped the scene. Injuries occurred to two other people.
15 July	35	63	Diyala, Iraq	Two men detonated explosive-laden belts seconds apart in a crowd of Army recruits at the Saad military base. The two bombers disguised themselves as recruits.
21 July	2	13	Kunming, Yunnan, China	Two bomb explosions occurred on board separate passenger buses during the early morning commute. The first blast happened at about 7:00 am and the second came about an hour later.
25 July	2	20	Bangalore, India	A series of nine blasts kills 2 and injures 20 people.
26 July	56	200	Ahmedabad, India	A series of seventeen blasts killing 49 and injuring 160 people.
27 July	~17	150+	Istanbul, Turkey	Two bombs kill 17 people and wound at least 150.
27 July	2	7	Knoxville, Tennessee, United States	Knoxville Unitarian Universalist church shooting, Jim David Adkisson kills 2 people and injures 7.

== August ==
Total incidents: 4

Date	Dead	Injured	Location	Description
9 August	2	23	Zemmouri, Boumerdès Province, Algeria	Suicide bomber drove and detonated a vehicle on a gendarmerie headquarters, killing several people. Al-Qaida suspected.
19 August	43	45	Issers, Boumerdès Province, Algeria	A suicide bomber drove a vehicle into a large group of military recruits gathering for exams. Although no one claimed responsibility, such attacks are usually blamed upon Al-Qaeda Organization in the Islamic Maghreb.
21 August	63	81	Wah, Attock District, Pakistan	Twin suicide bombings kill 63 people and injure 81 people targeting Pakistan's main munitions factory, the Pakistan Ordnance Factories. The Pakistani Taliban claims responsibility in retaliation for Pakistan Army attacks in the War in North-West Pakistan.
23 August	8		Swat, Pakistan	A suicide bomber drives and detonates a vehicle into a checkpoint, killing 8 policemen and injuring several others.

== September ==
Total incidents: 11

Date	Dead	Injured	Location	Description
6 September	50+	80+	Peshawar, Pakistan	Two bombs exploded. The first occurred when suicide bomber in a pickup truck, detonated near a paramilitary checkpoint, killing 16. Two hours later, a suicide bomber struck a police post, killing 30 and injuring dozens.
12 September	28	40	Salah ad Din, Iraq	28 people killed and 40 injured in a suicide car bombing. The attack happened around 1800 (1500 GMT), when a suicide bomber drove and detonated a vehicle into a police station.
13 September	30	90	Delhi, India	A series of 5 bombs exploded in Delhi, killing 30 and injuring 90.
15 September	22	32	Diyala, Iraq	A female suicide bomber detonates herself at a party, killing 22 and injuring 32.
15 September	8	132	Morelia, Michoacán, Mexico	A series of grenades are detonated in crowds gathered to celebrate Independence Day.
17 September	16+	16+	Sanaa, Yemen	A car bomb exploded outside the U.S. Embassy, followed by an assault by militants. The attackers, reportedly dressed as policemen, also exchanged rocket and gun fire. A group calling itself Islamic Jihad in Yemen claimed responsibility.
20 September	60+	250+	Islamabad, Pakistan	The Marriott Hotel is attacked by a massive suicide car bomb, killing over 60 and injuring 250. The blast caused a natural gas leak fire, which destroyed the hotel further. Hours before the blast, President Asif Ali Zardari addressed a joint session of Parliament and promised to root out terrorism.
27 September	17	14	Damascus, Syria	At least 17 people were killed and 14 hurt by a car bomb. The target of the blast was unclear, but it struck close to an important Shia shrine and a security post.
28 September	34	100+	Baghdad, Iraq	Several blasts occurred across Baghdad in what turned out to be the deadliest day in the city during Ramadan. The first attack was planted inside a minibus, in the Shurta neighborhood, killing 12 and injuring at least 30. Minutes later, a car bomb exploded in the Hay al-Amil district, killing one. Later, a suicide bomber wearing an explosives vest detonated minutes after a bomb in a parked car exploded. A roadside bomb also occurred within the time frame. An Iraqi government security spokesperson said "the insurgents want to show there is no security in Baghdad".
28 September	7	30	Tripoli, Lebanon	A car bomb targeting a military bus carrying soldiers detonated, killing 7 and injuring 30.
30 September	8	30	Gujarat and Maharashtra, India	Three bombs explode in two states killing 8 and injuring 30.

== October ==
Total incidents: 4

Date	Dead	Injured	Location	Description
1 October	~4	100	Agartala, India	Three bombs exploded in insurgency-racked North-East India. Police said they suspected Muslim militant groups based in Bangladesh for the blasts in the Radhanagar and Gulbazar areas of Tripura's capital.
10 October	113	100+	Orakzai, Pakistan	A suicide bomber drove his car into a meeting of 600 people which was being held in open ground and blew himself up. The meeting was a council of local leaders discussing to raise a militia to evict Taliban from the region.
21 October	17+	30+	Imphal, India	A bomb was suspected to have been planted on a moped near the Manipur police commando complex at Minuthong at 19:30. Police said none of the Manipur police commando personnel staying at the barrack complex were among the casualties. Unconfirmed reports, however, said a surrendered militant may be among the dead.
30 October	84+	470+	Assam, India	A series of 13 blasts occurred in and around Guwahati.

== November ==
Total incidents: 2

Date	Dead	Injured	Location	Description
6 November	11	41	Vladikavkaz, Russia	A bombing on a microbus killed 11 people and injured 41 more. The attack occurred in the province of North Ossetia bordering war-scarred Chechnya as well as the disputed territory of South Ossetia. Investigators stated that a female suicide bomber may have conducted the attack.
26–29 November	175	327+	Mumbai, India	Armed terrorists opened fire at eight different sites in a coordinated attack. They wielded automatic weapons and attacked locations including a train station, hotels, restaurants, a police station, and a hospital. Some terrorists took hostages and high military grade explosives (RDX) were found nearby; at least eight explosions were reported.

== December ==
Total incidents: 2

Date	Dead	Injured	Location	Description
5 December	29	100	Peshawar, Pakistan	A car bomb is detonated near a Shia mosque in the central Kissa Khwani bazaar.
24 December	860+	?	Haut-Uele, Democratic Republic of the Congo	2008 Christmas massacres
