= Times Square bomb attack =

Times Square bomb attack could refer to:

- 2008 Times Square bombing, an attack on a US armed forces recruiting station
- A failed September 2009 al-Qaeda plot by Najibullah Zazi and alleged co-conspirators
- 2010 Times Square car bombing attempt, a failed car bomb attack
- 2017 New York City Subway bombing, a failed attack on the Times Square subway station
