= Haji Musa Khan =

Pakistani tribal elder

Malak Haji Musa Khan Shaheed
- موسی خان
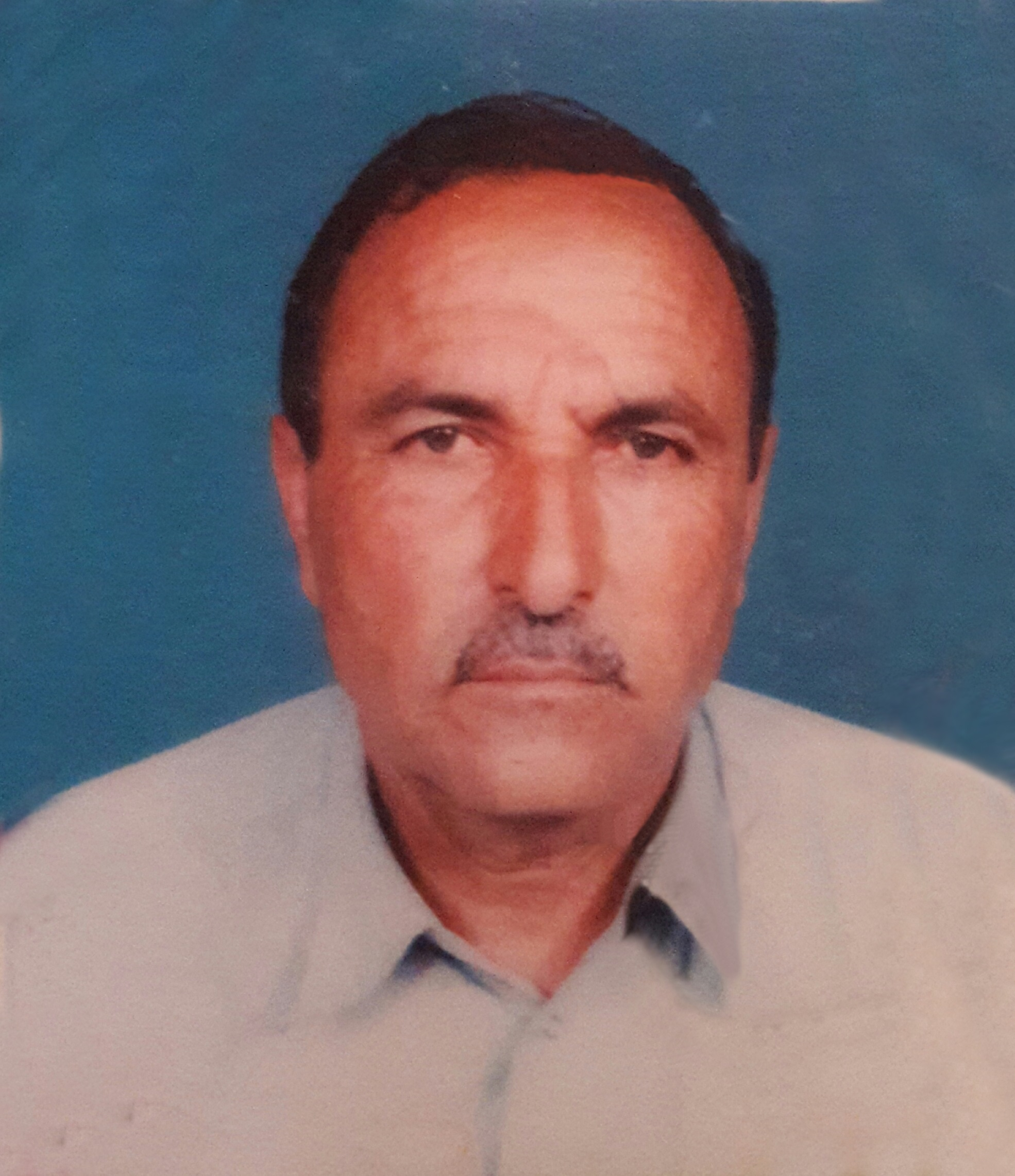
- Born: 1950; Ningolai, Swat
- Died: August 21, 2008 (aged 58); Ningolai, Swat
- Cause of death: Assassinated by Taliban
- Body discovered: Musa Khan has been was found shot dead from a single gunshot wound to the head.
- Burial place: Malak Abad Graveyard; 34°50′7.94″N 72°24′35.24″E
- Monuments: Musa Khan Mohallah; Haji.Musa Khan (Shaheed) Filling Station
- Other names: Haji Sahib, Malak Sahib, Khan
- Citizenship: Pakistan
- Occupation: Late pro-government tribal elder
- Known for: Bravery, patriotic
- Title: joint secretary of tehsil Kabal
- Political party: PPP Pakistan peoples party
- Children: Ex-Village Nazim and VDC Chairman Shaheed Fatihullah Khan & Habibullah Khan
- Father: Malak Amanullah Khan
- Relatives: Malak Mohibullah Khan (Brother)
- Family: Grand Sons; Riaz Ahmad Khan; Imran Khan; Malak Rahmat Ali Khan; Malak Barkat Ali Khan; Malak Azmat Ali Khan; Malak Abdullah Khan
- Website: ningolai.weebly.com

Haji Musa Khan (Pashto: حاجی موسی خان) also known as Haji Sahib or Malak Sahib (1950 - August 21, 2008) was a Pakistani Pashtun, former Councillor of Union council Bara Bandai in Swat valley Khyber Pakhtunkhwa. He was a late pro-government tribal elder and head of Village Ningolai. He was considered to be one of the most powerful & Brave tribal elder in Tehsil Kabal. After surviving several assassination attempts over the years by the Taliban, Musa Khan was finally assassinated by the group (approximately up to 300 militants) of Taliban. He was shot dead as soon as he stepped out of the Mosque after maghrib prayers.

== Personal life ==
Haji Musa Khan was born in 1950 in the Swat (princely state), Khyber Pakhtunkhwa Province, where he was raised. He hailed from the Yousafzai tribe of the Pashtuns. Musa Khan was illiterate. At younger age, he spent time in UAE and visited many Arab countries.

== Political life ==
After, the state of Swat (princely state) was included in civil administration of NWFP (khyber pakhtunkhwa) Pakistan in 1969. The first large and ruling political party was PPP (Pakistan peoples party). Haji Musa khan joined ppp in his younger age. Later he was designated as a secretary of Tehsil Kabal PPP. He was a senior Member of PPP. Till death he was a member of PPP. In Local body election 2001 he elected as a Councillor of UC Bara Bandai, and won with a large margin of votes.

== Opposition to Taliban ==
Quote Musa Khan "I shall die but will not leave the ground to militants"
One of the few opponents, not in exile, of the Taliban in the region, he has been guarded by Family, relatives, Security forces and personal guards. He survived several assassination attempts allegedly by the supporters of Maulana Fazlullah. When Taliban took birth in Swat in 2006, Haji Musa khan was strictly restricting them. He became the Enemy of Taliban and targeted in the hit list of Taliban. He and his family left Swat for a short duration after the Taliban took control of Swat. They returned after the PakArmy-led invasion of Swat in 2008. He supported security forces to eliminate Taliban from Swat for peace in area. After several assassination attempts by Taliban, they attacked with a large group of militants over Musa Khan, when he was coming home after offering Isha prayers in the Ningolai area of Kabal. His guards opened fire but the assailants managed to escape. A passerby was injured in the firing. Taliban spokesman Muslim Khan claimed responsibility for the killing and accused the tribal elder of being an active supporter of security forces. “He provided land for a security checkpost and several of our men were arrested at the post.” After few days militants blew up the abandoned houses and a hujra of late pro-government tribal elder Musa Khan and his brother Mohibullah Khan.

== Family ==
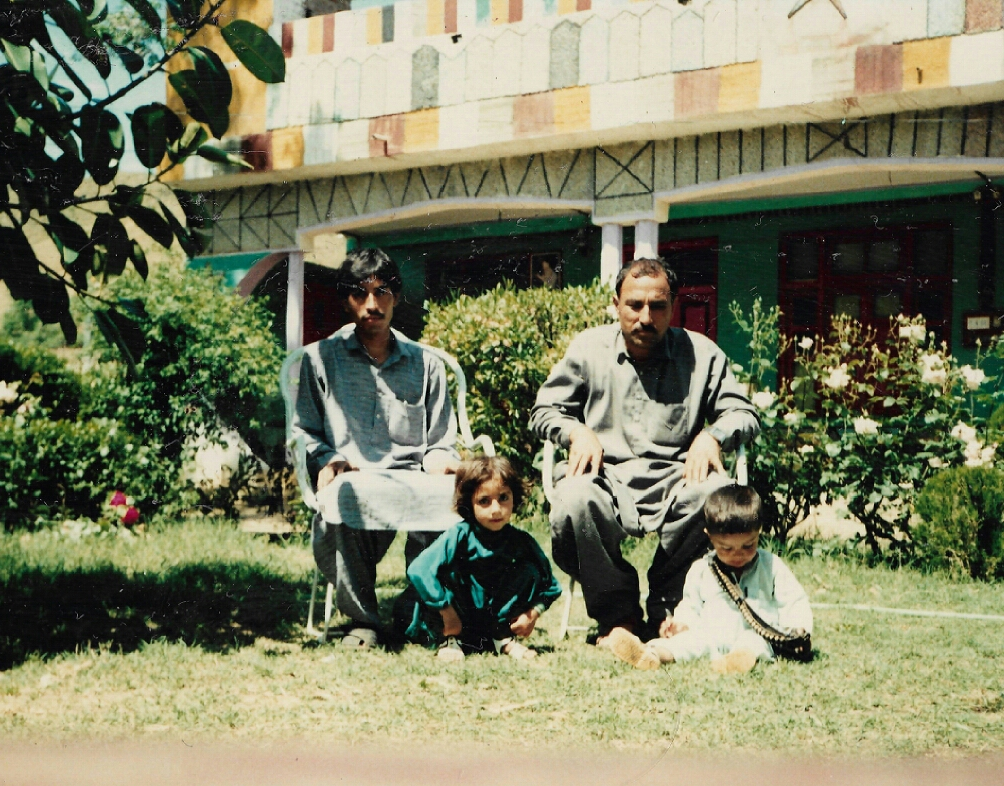
Musa Khan with his son Fatihullah Khan and grandson Imran Khan (1992)

Musa Khan was the son of Malak Amanullah Khan. Married at younger age. He had two siblings & two step-siblings. Brother Mohibullah Khan. Four children, sons Fatihullah Khan and Habibullah Khan & two daughters. His elder son Fatihullah Khan followed in his father's footsteps and became chairman of VDC (Village Defense Committee), member of Qaumi Aman jirga, Village nazim of Ningolai.

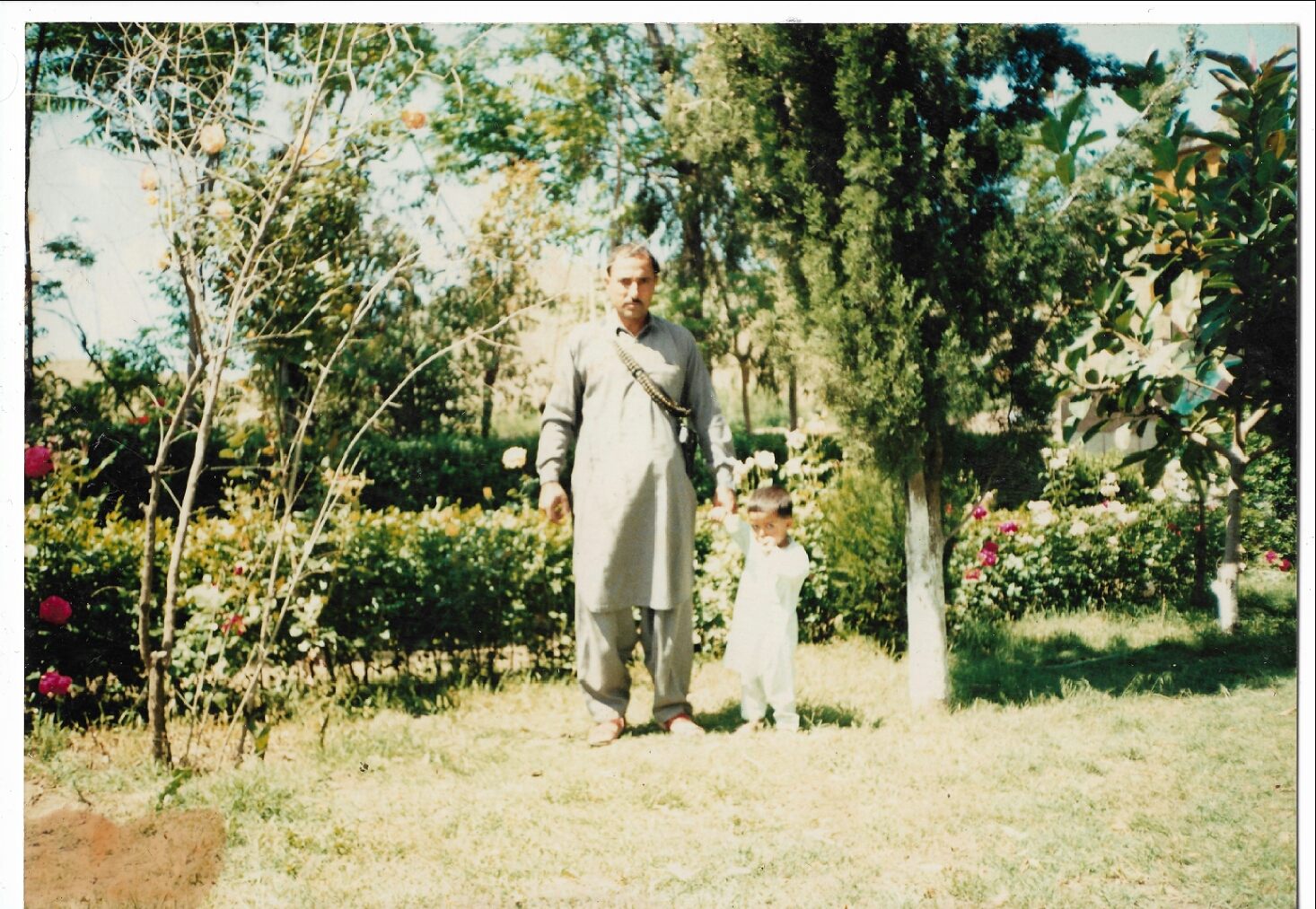
Musa Khan with his grandson Imran khan (1992)

== Death ==
Haji Musa Khan was assassinated by Militants on 21 August 2008. Taliban spokesman Muslim Khan claimed responsibility for killing Musa Khan.
