= 2009 Chakwal mosque bombing =

30 killed and 150 injured in blast at a Shia mosque in Chakwal, Pakistan

5 April 2009 Chakwal Mosque attack
- Location: Chakwal, Punjab, Pakistan
- Date: 5 April 2009 (UTC+05.00)
- Attack type: Suicide bombing
- Weapon: Bomb
- Deaths: 30+
- Injuries: 150
- Perpetrator: unknown

The 2009 Chakwal mosque bombing occurred on 5 April 2009, in Chakwal in the Punjab province of Pakistan. An initial casualty count of 30 was reported with at least 150 injuries. The mosque was reportedly "packed" at the time of the explosion. The attack occurred during a religious congregation

== Background ==
Chakwal is a town located in the Pakistani province of Punjab.

The bombing of the Chakwal mosque came just over a week after another mosque bombing in the Federally Administered Tribal Areas. The attack also occurred at a minority Shia mosque.

=== Follow up ===
The attack came a day after eight paramilitary soldiers were killed in a suicide attack in the capital Islamabad.

== Attack ==
There was no immediate claim of responsibility though security officials said they believed the attack to be a result of a suicide bombing. The attack also came only days after Tehreek-e-Taliban leader Baitullah Mehsud warned of increased attacks.

== See also ==
- Violence in Pakistan 2006-09, table and map providing overview of all violence in Pakistan between 2006 and 2009.
