= Shamshi Khel =

Coordinates: 32°55′24″N 70°44′46″E

- Town and union council
- Interactive map of Shamshi Khel
- Country: Pakistan
- Province: Khyber-Pakhtunkhwa
- District: Bannu District
- Time zone: UTC+5 (PST)

Shamshi Khel Bannu is a town and union council in Bannu District of Khyber-Pakhtunkhwa. It is located at 32°55'24N 70°44'46E and has an altitude of 287 metres (944 feet).

1.

Shamshi Khel (Ahmadzai Wazir Tribe)

- This Shamshi Khel is a sub-clan of the Ahmadzai Wazir tribe.
- The Ahmadzai Wazirs are part of the larger Karlani Pashtun group.
- They are based mainly in South Waziristan (especially Wana), Bannu, Tank, and parts of Afghanistan.
- This Shamshi Khel traces its lineage to Sheikh Hassan, alongside other sub-clans like Boya Khel and Namari Khel.

2.

Shamshi khel (Yusufzai Tribe)

- The Shamshi Khels are sub-clan of the Yusufzai nikpikhel and malakzai Mandarn Yousafzai tribe.
- Shamshe Khel found in Swat Valley, especially in villages like Hazara (Kabal), Kanju, and Aligrama belongs to Nikpikhel yousafzai.
- Shamshi Khel of Mandarn living in Shangla Velley tehsil Chakisar Village Gunangar the fifth Hujra of Chakisar belongs to the Muhammad Khel branch of Malakzai section in Razar and large number of this tribe are living in Yar Hussain and sherdara in Swabi.
- yousafzai Shamshe Khel in swat district belongs to the Zubar Khel branch of Aisha Khel section in nikpikhel.
- Yousafzai > Khwajazai > Nikpikhel > Aishakhel > Zubirkhel >Khata Khel 1. Khani Khel, 2. Shamshi Khel, 3.Adro/duro Khel, 4. Shekhaan
- Shamshi Khel swat: Shamshi Khel in District Swat is fraction of khata Khel clan of the Yusufzai, one of the largest Pashtun tribes. They primarily reside in the Swat Valley of Khyber Pakhtunkhwa, Pakistan, specifically in villages such as Kanju, Aligrama, Hazara.The Yusufzai tribe is known for its significant presence in northern Khyber Pakhtunkhwa and parts of Afghanistan .

Summary

“Shamshi khel” denotes three separate Pashtun tribal affiliations: one as a subtribe of the Yusufzai in the Swat Valley, and second Shangla Chakisar Mandarn yousafzai and other as union council and Ahmadzai Wazir in Bannu District Khyber Pakhtunkhwa. Despite sharing the same name, these groups have distinct ancestries and inhabit different regions.
