= 2008 Peshawar bombings =

Terrorist Attack in Pakistan

There were two bombings in Peshawar, North West Frontier Province, Pakistan, in 2008.

== September 2008 Peshawar bombing ==
September 2008 Peshawar bombing
- Location: Peshawar, Pakistan
- Date: 6 September 2008
- Attack type: Bombing
- Deaths: 35
- Injuries: 70

The September 2008 Peshawar bombing was a bombing that occurred on 6 September 2008, in the outskirts of Peshawar. A suicide bomber blew up at a police checkpoint, killing 35 and injuring 70. The explosives-packed pick-up truck blasted a crater 3-foot-deep (0.91 m) crater and caused some buildings in a nearby market to collapse, leading to frantic rescue efforts.

== December 2008 Peshawar bombing ==
December 2008 Peshawar bombing
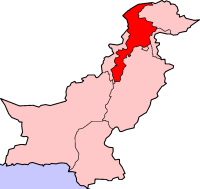
- Khyber Pakhtunkhwa Province shown within Pakistan
- Location: Peshawar, Pakistan
- Date: 5 December 2008
- Target: Westerners
- Attack type: Car bombing
- Deaths: 29
- Injuries: over 100

The December 2008 Peshawar bombing was a bombing that occurred on 5 December 2008 in Peshawar, killing 29 people and injuring over 100 others. Local police chief Naveed Khan suggested that chemicals intended to increase the spread of fire were contained in the bomb.

The attack destroyed a hotel and a mosque, and set fire to several shops.

=== Background ===
The incidents took place while people were shopping for the Eid al-Adha festival, which starts on 9 December 2008, and it took place on the same day as another attack in the country, which killed six people. This attack took place in the area south of Peshawar.

During the weeks before the attack Sunni Muslim groups of militants launched attacks on the minority Shi'ite population, with this attack being located near a community centre for Shi'ites.

=== Reaction ===
Asif Ali Zardari, the President of Pakistan, strongly condemned the attacks, and said that the perpetrators of the attacks will be found and brought to justice, and expressed his condolences to the families of the dead.

He also stated, in response to the attacks, that his country was committed to fighting terrorism. The Pakistani military strengthened its operations against the Taliban and al-Qaida, who are blamed for the attacks.

== See also ==
- List of terrorist incidents in 2008
- List of violent incidents in Pakistan (2006–2009)
