= 2008 Balad Ruz bombing =

2008 suicide bombing in Iraq

Coordinates: 33.7°N 45.083333°E

15 September 2008 Balad Ruz bombing
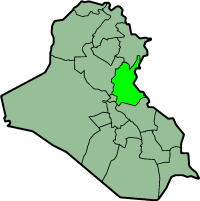
- Location: Balad Ruz, Iraq
- Date: 15 September 2008 (UTC+3)
- Target: Guests at a Party
- Attack type: suicide bombing
- Deaths: 22
- Injuries: 32

The 15 September 2008 Balad Ruz bombing occurred on 15 September 2008 in Balad Ruz, Diyala when a suicide bomber walked into and detonated herself at an Iftar banquet being held in the home of a policeman in celebration of his release from American detention at Camp Bucca. The attack killed 22 and injured 32. Some of the wounded were taken to a joint US-Iraqi base nearby for treatment. 12 were killed in two car bombings in central Baghdad.

== See also ==
- List of terrorist incidents in 2008
