= 2008 Agartala bombings =

Terrorist incident in Tripura, India

- Location: 23.84°N 91.28°E; Agartala, India
- Date: 1 October 2008; 21:30 (UTC+05:30)
- Attack type: 5 serial blasts
- Weapon: Crude bombs
- Deaths: 4
- Injuries: 76-100
- Perpetrator: All-Tripura Tiger Force

In the 2008 Agartala bombings at least 4 people were killed and a 100 injured on 1 October 2008 in a series of 5 blasts set off in Agartala, capital of the Indian state of Tripura, within 45 minutes, while two unexploded bombs were defused.

This is the fourth series of blasts in India within a week, the other three being the 27 September Delhi bombing, and the Malegoan and Modasa bombings.

== Attack ==
The blasts went off at Agartala's main shopping area Maharaja Ganja Bazar, Gobind Ballav Pant market, a busy Radhanagar bus stand, Agartala Motorstand, Battala and Abhay Nagar localities. The first blast happened at Gol Bazar around 7:30 pm (IST), followed by two more at Radha Nagar Bus stand and G B Bazar, around 7:35 and 8:15 respectively. The fourth at Palace Compound. An unidentified man was killed in the blast at Radhanagar bus stand while another person succumbed to injuries. Meanwhile, eyewitnesses said two persons riding a motorcycle were seen moving suspiciously at Radhanagar bus stand and the blast took place about three minutes after they left the area.

The wounded were rushed to G.B. Pant Medical College and Hospital. Tripura police spokesman Nepal Das said that two were high-density blasts, the third a low-density one. Though SP of West Agartala KV Sreejesh contradicted Das about the intensity of blasts, "All bombs were of low intensity. It was meant to create panic before the Durga puja celebrations."

=== Follow-up ===
On 5 October another live bomb was found and defused in a temple in Agartala. Police officials said the powerful bomb, prepared with ammonium nitrate and other explosive materials and connected to a cell-phone, was found placed in a small tin in a Manipuri temple at the Radhanagar area. The bomb was found on Mahasasthi, the first of the five-day Durga puja festival.

== Investigation ==
The police suspect the involvement of Bangladesh-based terror group Harkat-ul-Jihad-e-Islami (HuJI), a group which has been frequently blamed for attacks in Uttar Pradesh and Hyderabad. HuJI which has been using Tripura as a transit route lately, as the state shares a porous 856-km border with the neighbouring country. Three suspected HuJI members were arrested in Agartala in the last two months. Tripura has long been a conduit for smuggling and terror merchandise, most violence in the state had been related to insurgencies of tribal groups.

Tripura's two main insurgent groups, the National Liberation Front of Tripura (NLFT) and the All-Tripura Tiger Force (ATTF) have not had a history of carrying out bomb attacks on civilians. However, a possible link between the two outfits and Bangladeshi Islamist groups like Huji had not been ruled out by security agencies. Tripura's long border with Bangladesh, as well as the presence of senior leaders of both NLFT and ATTF in Bangladesh have increased the likelihood of logistical support to Huji.

Experts from the National Security Guards (NSG) began an investigation seeking to find the nature of explosives used. The team of NSG experts, led by Major Karam Bir from New Delhi, and a team of experts from the National Forensic Laboratory in Kolkata are investigating along with Tripura police officials.

DIG, Nepal Das said six persons have been arrested in connection to the attacks. Four persons, including one of those seen on a bike at the Radhanagar bus stand shortly before the blast there, were arrested on the same night of the explosions. Six extremist of the banned terrorist group All Tripura Tiger Force were convicted by High court of Tripura.

=== Conspiracy ===
Times Now (the television arm of the Times of India) quoted "highly placed intelligence officials" from the Research and Analysis Wing who claimed to have made a technical intercept of a communication between operatives of Bangladesh's intelligence agencies and the Inter Services Intelligence (ISI) of Pakistan. The sources said the intercept indicated ISI wanted its Bangladeshi counterpart to activate its operatives in Northeast India. Based on this, security agencies operating in the Northeast, like the Border Security Forces, the Shastra Seema Bal and provincial governments in the region were put on alert by the central intelligence agencies. The media outlet speculated that it wanted DGFI to specifically target Northeastern states to give terror a pan-India outlook and not allow the country's internal security establishment a chance to come to grip with the situation.

== Reactions ==
A spokesman from the PMO said the PM Singh had spoken to the Chief Minister who had apprised Singh about the incident in his state. Singh, via the spokesman, also condemned the attacks on innocent people and expressed his sorrow over the incident.

The ruling Communist Party of India's general secretary Prakash Karat said "The central government should extend all help to the state government in tracking down the culprits behind this attack especially in view of the fact that the state has international borders on its three sides." He also noted that the Left Front government in Tripura has registered significant success in tackling the extremist groups who used to resort to terrorist violence in the insurgency-racked state. He claimed that the explosions must be seen as an attempt to destabilise the situation. He also said he had spoken to Chief Minister Manik Sarkar to be updated on the situation.

== See also ==
- List of terrorist incidents in 2008
