= Bara Bandai =

- Union Council & village
- بره بانڈئ
- Location within Pakistan
- Coordinates: 34°46′N 72°21′E
- Country: Pakistan
- Province: Khyber Pakhtunkhwa
- District: Swat

Area
  - Total: 6 km^{2} (2.3 sq mi)

Population (2009)
  - Total: 19,374
- Time zone: UTC+5 (PST)
- Postal code: 19201
- Website: www.facebook.com/Bara Bandai

Bara Bandai (برہ بانڈئ) is a village in Swat, Khyber Pakhtunkhwa, Pakistan, known as an area crossed by Alexander the Great during his invasion of the subcontinent. The people of village Bara Bandai belong to subsection Naikpikhel of Yusufzai the biggest and largest tribe of Pashtun or Pakhtun tribes. It is one of the Provincially Administered Tribal Areas (PATA) of Pakistan. The village contains a small series of mountains and a forest, residential area starting from meadows of mountainsand merge with river swat on right bank, a village market, vast land for crops, number of canals, and a part of the Swat river. Mountains of the village include Usmani Sar, Kafar Ghat and Najia Top.

== Etymology ==
The village was renamed by Yusufzai Pakhtuns after capturing it. The name Bara means "Upper" and Bandai means "Meadow", hence was named Bara Bandai due to its locality. On the West side of Bara Bandai is the neighbouring village Kuza Bandai which means The Lower Meadow. The names were basically given by their greenery, comparing the distances of both villages from Mingora the main city of Swat Valley, and by comparing their distances from the upper hilly areas of Swat such as Kalam and Bahrain. The ancient names of these villages are not known as they are just mentioned by locations in old times books and scripts.

== Location ==
Bara Bandai is about 8 Kilometers away from Mingawara or Mingoara, the main city of Swat Valley and 10 Kilometers from Saidu Sharif the Capital of the Yousufzai State of Swat (Princely State). Situated on the left bank (North side) of Suvastu or The River Swat and is important and one of the large village of Nikpikhel. Nikpikhel is a sub tribe of Akozai and Khudizai Yousufzai and their area stretches in North to Godamanai bordering directly with Dir district, Ningolai is on the East, Dadahara and Shamozai on the West. On the South side of Nikpikhel is The River Swat ([Suvastu]). Bara Bandai is about 80 Kilometers from Kalam, the famous tourist spot of North Pakistan. Bara Bandai comes under the PK-9 constituency of Khyber Pakhtunkhwa Provincial Assembly and NA-4 constituency of National Assembly of Pakistan.

== Post Code ==
19201

== Photos ==
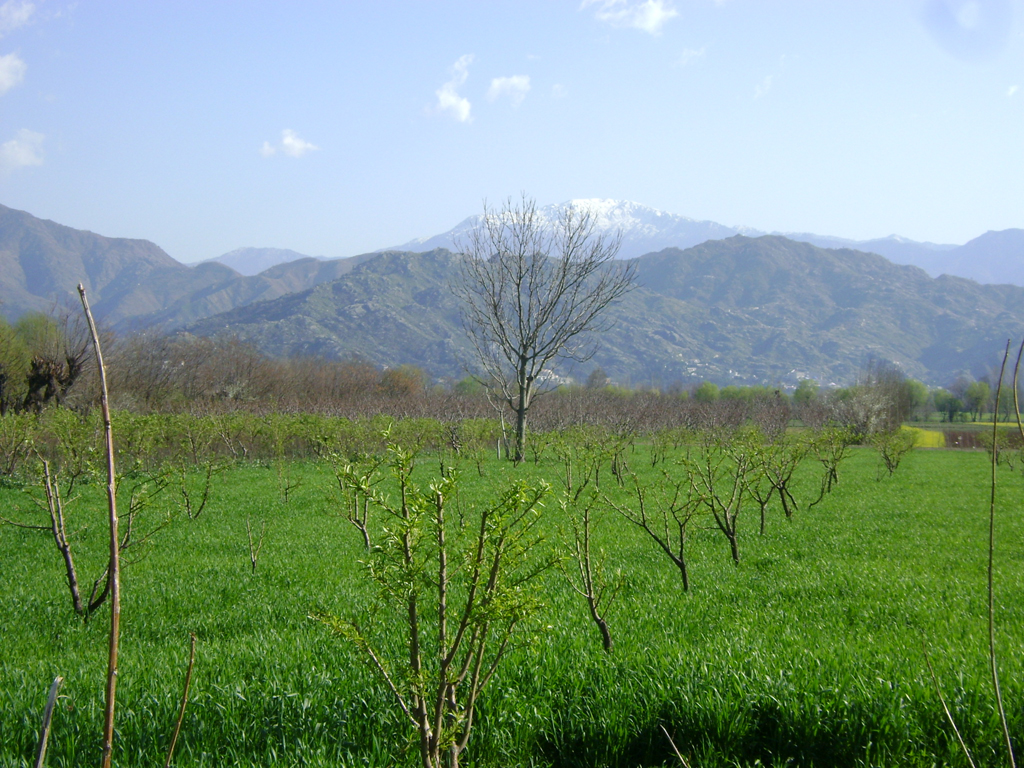
Peach Trees, Bara Bandai

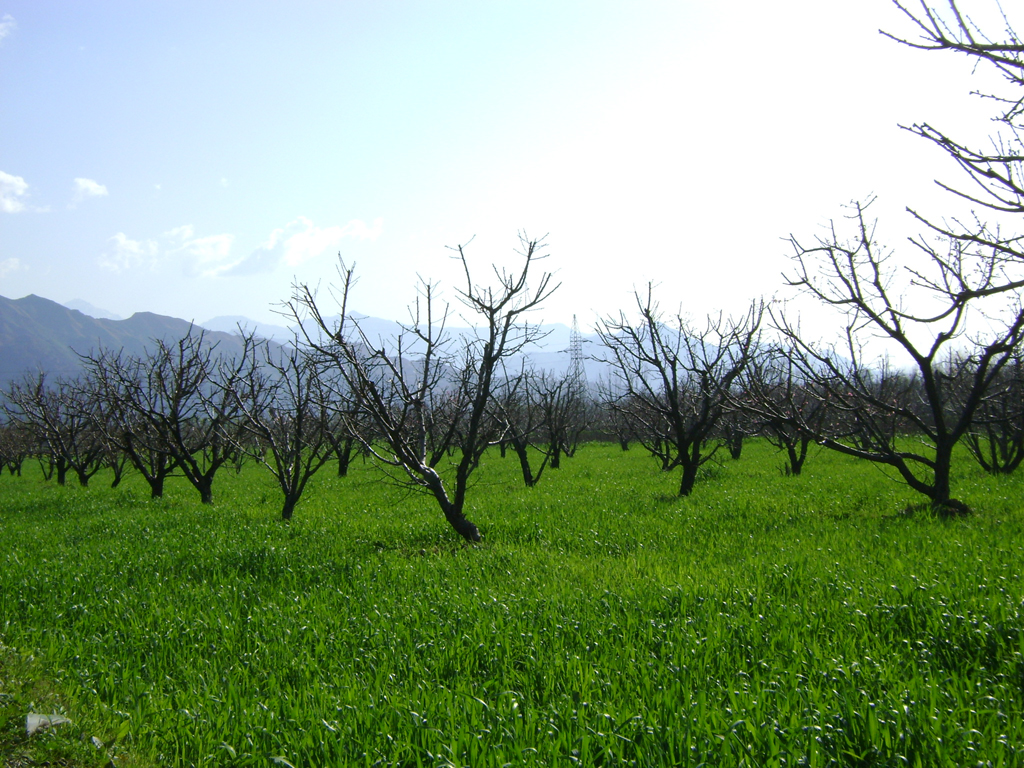
Peach Trees, Bara Bandai

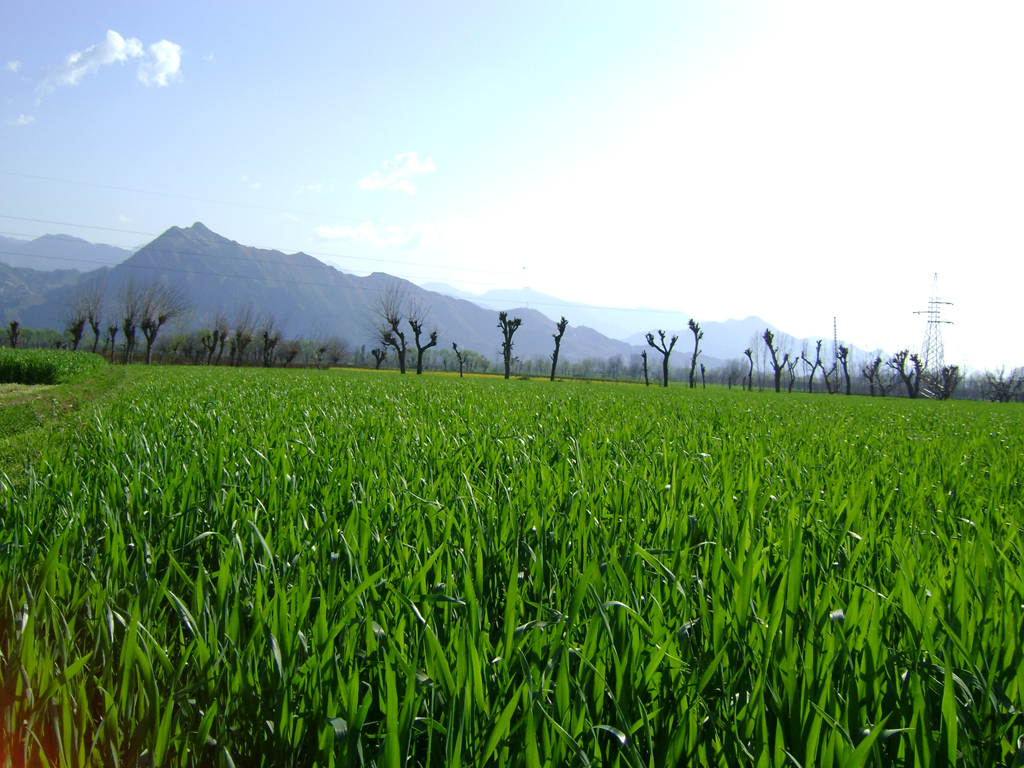
Greenery, Bara Bandai

== Division ==
The village residential areas are divided into sub units called as Chams (Pashto: چم) or Mohallah. Some of the major sub units are.

Hafiz baba, Ali khan khel, Morragai (Miangano Cham), Kotkay, Sarkhana, Shado khel, Awdal Khel, Nasar Khel, Bazar. Chapolo (related to chapolo masjid which names after the tribe lived there named as "chapolo miagan"), Saidu Bibi (named after the aunt of Wali Swat lived there. She was from Saidu Sharif and belongs to Royal family of swat), Matra, Sarhad Colony, Warsaky, khamoosh colony, thana, khona mohalla(territory of khona masjid)

== Languages ==
All the residents speak Pashto as their native language.

== Education ==
The village consist of 1 high, 3 govt boys primary schools and 1 middle govt school for girls along with a number of schools in private sector.

== Health ==
Bara Bandai has its own Basic Health Unit (BHU), numerous clinical laboratories and a number of clinics in private sector which provide healthcare facilities to the residents.

== Administration ==
Administratively, the village is parl of the same name, Union Council Bara Bandai. It is further divided into two Neighbourhood Councils, namely Bara Bandai I & Bara Bandai II. Each neighbourhood council has its own administrative office in their respective Neighbourhood Council with a Village Council Secretary to supervise and oversee the implementation of development schemes and other council activities. Elected members of the councils are elected in Local Government elections under Local Government Act 2013 of Khyber Pakhtunkhwa.

== Climate ==
The weather of the village is cold in the winter season and moderate during summer. Snowfall in winter intensify its beauty.

== Agriculture ==
Swat Valley is known for peach production. The village has numerous private peach orchards.

The village climate made it favorable for many crops and fruits. The village not only fulfill their own need but also supply its product to other areas. Among these onion and peach are commonly produce.

== Notable figures ==
Aimal Khan (a renowned Volleyball player belonging to Awdal Khel tribe). Aimal Khan captain of Pakistan National Volleyball team.

Shaykh Abu Eesa Niamatullah (a Yousafzai of Nasir Khel tribe, an internationally acclaimed religious scholar)

Sultan Room Nasir Khail (Member of Provincial Assembly, PK-9)
