= 2008 Tripoli, Lebanon bombings =

Attacks on military buses in Lebanon

Coordinates: 34.433°N 5.85°E

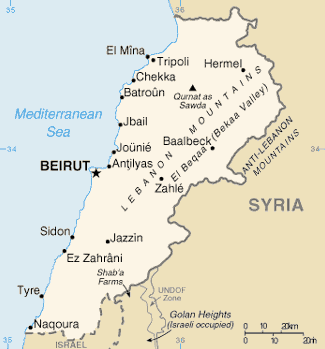
- Location: Tripoli, Lebanon
- Date: August 13 and September 29, 2008 (UTC+2)
- Target: Military buses
- Attack type: Bus bombing (August); Car bombing (September)
- Deaths: 15 (August); 7 (September)
- Injuries: 40+ (August); 30 (September)
- Perpetrator: unknown

Bombings occurred in Tripoli, Lebanon on August 13 and September 29, 2008. Both attacks targeted military buses.

== Background ==
Beginning in May, Tripoli saw some of its worst sectarian battles, pitting Sunni groups which support the Western-backed Lebanese Government against the Arab Democratic Party (ADP) of the city's Alawite community. ADP is a part of the opposition, and has close links to the Alawite-dominated regime in Damascus.

A formal reconciliation was reached in September 2008, between the feuding factions in north Lebanon.

Rifaat Eid, the son of the leader of the ADP, accused Saudi Arabia of funding Salafi jihadists in Northern Lebanon, blaming them for the violence. "The Salafis are like kittens when they are weak, but when they are strong they are like tigers." Salafist leaders in Tripoli insisted that the threat of jihadist militancy is exaggerated. Sheikh Omar Bakri, a Salafist preacher, said "They say we are fanatics and cite what is happening in Iraq, but this is just propaganda to weaken the Sunnis in Lebanon."

== Bombings ==
On August 13, a bomb in a briefcase on a bus carrying Lebanese Army soldiers killed 15 people including 10 soldiers. Two days previously there was another attack, this one a bombing in neighbouring Syria. There was a quick chorus of condemnation and denunciation from local politicians, who said it was targeted at the army. Former Prime Minister of Lebanon Najib Mikati told a local radio station: "This is a direct targeting of the military institution."

In August, Bashar al-Assad, the Syrian President, gave a warning that Islamic extremists were destabilising Northern Lebanon. Later, at the beginning of September, thousands of Syrian troops deployed along the Lebanon-Syria border, triggering fears in Beirut of a possible military incursion.

On September 29, 2008, a car bombing occurred in Tripoli, Lebanon, targeting a military bus carrying soldiers, killing 7 and injuring 30 people. Lebanese officials said the blast came from a car parked by a busy roadside and was detonated by remote control.

== See also ==
- List of terrorist incidents in 2008
