= Pakistan Ordnance Factories explosion =

Industrial accident in Pakistan

- Date: 12 August 2021
- Time: (UTC+05:00)
- Location: Pakistan Ordnance Factories, Wah Cantt, Rawalpindi District, Pakistan
- Deaths: 3
- Injuries: 2

On 12 August 2021, an explosion at the Pakistan Ordnance Factory plant in Wah Cantt, Rawalpindi District killed three workers and injured two others.

The Pakistan Army Public Relations confirmed that an accident had occurred at the POF plant due to a technical fault, that killed three employees and two others injured were shifted to a hospital. According to ISPR, the scene has been cleared and the situation is under the control of the POF Technical Emergency Response Team.

== See also ==
- 2008 Wah bombing
