= 2008 Imphal bombing =

Terrorist incident in India

Coordinates: 24.82°N 93.95°E

21 October 2008 Imphal bombings
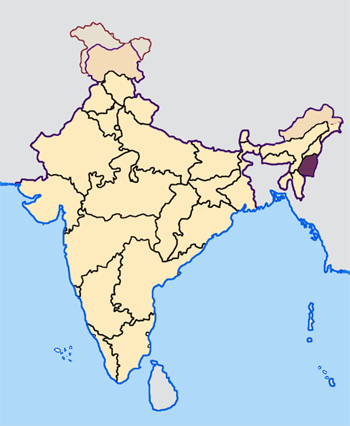
- Location: Imphal, Manipur, India
- Date: 21 October 2008; 19:30 (UTC+05:30)
- Attack type: Bike bomb
- Weapon: Crude bomb
- Deaths: 17
- Injuries: 40+
- Perpetrator: Kangleipak Communist Party (Military Council)

In the 2008 Imphal bombings, at least 17 people were killed and more than 30 were injured on 21 October 2008.

This was the second blast of such a magnitude in the Indian Seven Sisters in the month of October 2008. It followed a season of bomb blasts around the country in 2008 that were carried out by various factions, contributing to a precipitous domestic instability.

== Attack ==
The attack was a single blast triggered from a bomb rigged on to a Kinetic Luna moped in the provincial capital of Manipur. The attack occurred at the gate of Ragailong in the Imphal West District.

The attack targeted the barracks of security personnel, as well as civilians in the area, who were gambling ahead of the Diwali holiday. Police said they suspected the headquarters of the 20th Battalion, Assam Rifles, and the Manipur police commando complex, where personnel live with their families, were the targets of the attackers.

=== Follow-up ===
The blast came just two days after an explosion near the Manipur Chief Minister Okram Ibobi Singh's official residence in the capital.

Two days later security forces shot as many as eight militants who were said to be members of the Kangleipak Communist Party (MC). Imphal East SP, Radheshyam Singh, said: "At least three encounters took place in the two police districts of Imphal East and Imphal West on Thursday evening, during which eight militants have been killed."

The post-blast security sweep resulted in an unidentified militant being killed in an encounter as the 29th Assam Rifles raided Sitakhul area under Tengnoupal police in Manipur's Chandel district bordering with Myanmar following reports of militants roaming the area on 30 October. As some militants opened fire at them, the military personnel were forced into the ensuing encounter. One lethod gun and three bombs were recovered from the spot as others reportedly escaped towards a thick hilly area. In 2008 alone over 310 people have been killed in counter militant activity.

== Investigation ==
Police believed the bomb was to avenge the killing of at least eight rebels by security forces last month. They have suspected the separatist People's Revolutionary Party of Kangleipak (PREPAK) to be responsible for the attack. The residents of Ragailong and its surrounding areas demanded a judicial inquiry into the attack. There was no word indicating the demands for a probe were heeded.

After the arrest and interrogation of the prime accused in the case, Sachindra Debbarma, it was revealed that the blast was planned at a hideout of the Assam-based National Democratic Front of Bodoland (NDFB) in Moulavibazar on 22 July. Police said, besides the cadres of the Pakistan-based ISI and the Bangladesh-based DGFI, seven militant outfits of the Northeastern region attended a meeting at the hideout and chalked out the blueprint for the attack. Debbarma also claimed that militants in the region, backed by some fundamentalist groups, were spreading a fake currency net in the region and planning to destabilise India. He also said that Sagam Ali, who had been arrested by BSF early in the year on the Tripura border, was sent for the same mission. Furthermore, four active mobile SIM cards, including one from Bangladesh, an amulet bearing his name, an international passport and address of a Karachi-based suspected ISI agent, were seized from Ali, a resident of Bongaigaon in Assam. This evidence led to the conclusion that he belonged to Hazrat Shah Sultan Gyasuddin Awalia and had travelled extensively to Bangladesh and Pakistan in 2007. He was remanded to judicial custody till 20 November after a court rejected his bail petition, along with that of all the other nine accused in the blasts.

== Responsibility ==
The following day the Kangleipak Communist Party (Military Council) (KCP (MC)) claimed responsibility for the blast saying it was a reaction to the gambling that reaches its peak during the Diwali holidays. The claim, distributed to newspaper offices in Imphal, said the explosion was triggered "in order to put an end to lagao," a form of gambling which it said was an "alien culture" that was adversely affecting Manipur society. A statement said "Lagao is a form of gambling which is alien to Meitei culture and it needs to be stopped." The statement was signed by Lanheiba Meitei, a leader of the KCP (MC) faction formed out of the original KCP that was formed in 1980. Kangleipak is the historical name of Manipur which was adopted by the KCP in its attempt at the preservation of the Meitei culture, while it also demands secession of Manipur from India in order to achieve such goals.

On 28 October, contradictory reports from the KCP (MC) clarified that it was not involved in attack. The information and public relation officer of the outfit, Puranthaba, did also allege that three of their members killed at the Heingang area earlier in the month were part of the four apprehended from Dimapur just before the alleged encounter. They also denied the possibility of a relationship with the deceased Paominlan and Haokhoken, whom Imphal east commandos and troops of 39 Assam Rifles had gunned down two days after the blast.

The KCP in general has seen an increased level of activity this month as the police reported the execution of two former members. They said the KCP's Thoubal district commander, identified as 2nd lieutenant Udoi alias Nongyai or Angousana, and his female companion, Leisa of Khangabok, were executed by the outfit for their anti-party and anti-revolutionary activities.

== Response ==
The initial response to the attack in a highly fortified area like Ragailong, meant the CM instructed the top brass of the security services to "take up all necessary measures so that such attacks do not recur." This especially rang true with the upcoming festivals of Diwali and Ningol Chakkouba, so as to ensure both pass off peacefully. The SSP of Imphal West, L Kailun, said "apart from intensifying security vigil at all strategic locations in Imphal, the police has also started conducting a massive drive to check any abandoned vehicles." An appeal was also made to citizens to be on high alert and to notify the police if they come across any suspicious objects in market places or crowded areas.

The bigger response to the attack saw the CM calling for the sealing of the border with Myanmar, he said: "We want the centre (federal government) to fence the border, we cannot let them (PREPAK) escape after the incident." An unnamed military commander also added that "We know where [the] militants have their camps across the border, but we can't go inside Myanmar chasing them." In addition a senior intelligence officer in the region added that "Our plan is to fence the border and step up foot patrolling along the border, otherwise it will be difficult to control the situation."

India claims that as many as 3,000 rebels, use the jungles of the Kabaw Valley in Sagaing Division, for training camps and staging areas for incursions into India. Although India has signed a pact with Myanmar to share intelligence, it has proven insufficient to tackle the insurgency that is said to be caused by New Delhi's plundering of the region's mineral and forest resources with little investment returning. In retaliation the rebels want to throw non-Meiteis out of the province, while seeking statehood, a demand to which India did not acquiesce. About 700 armed PREPAK rebels have carried out regular attacks in the area. According to police, the rebels were believed to have escaped across a large porous border to their camps in neighbouring Myanmar. The border with Myanmar stretches about 370 km (230 mi), and security officials want the entire stretch to be barbed-wired to stop the smuggling of weapons and explosives. The entire area, home to more than 200 tribes, has been racked insurgencies virtually since India's independence.

== Reactions ==
Manipur Governor Gurbachand Jagat condemned the bomb blast as an act of terrorism and mindless violence. He stated that the act was targeted against the people of Manipur as a whole, and called upon all peace-loving citizens to condemn such violence as an act against the people and culture of Manipur. He also condemned the perpetrators of the attack for causing injury and distress to the many innocent victims, while he also conveyed his condolences to the bereaved families who faced loss through this barbaric act.

CM Singh, along with giving the assurance of paying an ex-gratia amount to the next of kin of the deceased, gave Rs 5,000 each as an immediate relief for the injured persons who were undergoing medical treatment.

Many social and political organization were also quick to come out in condemnation of either the attack or at least the government:

- The United Committee Manipur (UCM) said the incident has once again shown the "inherent weakness and total failure of the Government in maintaining law and order."
- The All Manipur United Clubs' Organisation (AMUCO) said that regardless of the non-state or state actors or agencies who may have been perpetrators, this should never be considered a part of the ongoing armed conflict since the attack targeted a crowded place.
- The secretary of the United People's Front, Manipur (UPF), N Rupachandra, said triggering a powerful bomb blast in a crowded place is a barbaric act which defies all reasoning.
- Also chiming in the publicity secretary of MAFYF General Council, H Manimohan, said it is the "biggest misfortune of the already hard pressed people of Manipur that they are being subjected to such brutal attacks."
- The Zeliangrong Union and Zeliangrong Youth Front of Assam, Manipur and Nagaland termed the explosion a barbaric and an act of terrorism which is against the law of the land.
- The United NGOs Mission, Manipur said the explosion was a crime against humanity.
- The Manipur State Council of the All India Students' Federation (AISF), said the incident was "a testimony of the complete failure of the Government in maintaining law and order in the State."(sic)
- Inpui (Kabui) Naga Union, Ragailong Pei (Court) and Ragailong Youth Club also strongly condemned the terror strike and Ragailong Pei has urged the Government to pay a befitting ex-gratia payment to all the bereaved families of the blast victims.
- The Centre for Organisation Research and Education (CORE) stood out in appreciated of the prompt response of the CM and other authorities concerned, while urging the government to implement the assurances given to the aggrieved families at the earliest possible date. They also demanded that the government book those involved in the bomb blast, while making an appeal to "all section of the people not to carry out any violent incidents in residential areas."
- Bharatiya Janata Party (BJP) Manipur Pradesh party members held condolences for an executive member of BJP Minority Morcha in observing two minutes of silence during a condolence meeting.
- The convenor of the JAC, Md Abdul Quayum, announced possible agitations in association with other civil organisations if the Government fails to book and punish those behind the blast.
- National Identity Protection Committee (NIPCO), Threatened Indigenous People's Society (TIPS), Kanglei Apunba Ima Yaipha Lup, Students Federation of India (Manipur State Committee) and the Communist Party of India (Marxist) Manipur State Committee also condemned the attack and decried the blast as "an act of terrorism which defies the existing International (sic) and humanitarian laws." The added their condemnation to the opposition controlled provincial government for its failure to protect the lives of people.
- The Manipur Pradesh Congress Committee appealed to all those concerned to ensure such violence incidents do not recur in the future.

On 28 October, public ire was shown against both separatists and the police. Protesters wielded placards reading "Killing innocents is not an act of revolution" and "Don’t kill innocents to show your power," amongst others. While the slogans were clearly directed at the militants, protesters also blamed the police for not paying heed to their call to crack down on gambling in the area, which was the raison d'être for the attack. Once activist said, "We have been calling upon the police for quite some time to take steps to check gambling in the area, but no one bothered to take action." Later, upon meeting the CM to submit a memorandum a member of the delegation said: "We have demanded a judicial enquiry into the incident and have sought relief for the families of those killed and injured."
