= 2008 Orakzai bombing =

Terrorist incident in Pakistan

Coordinates: 33.666°N 73.166°E

10 October 2008 Orakzai bombing
- Location: Orakzai Agency, Pakistan
- Date: 10 October 2008 (UTC+5)
- Attack type: Suicide car bomb
- Deaths: 110
- Injuries: 200+

The 10 October 2008 Orakzai bombing occurred when a suicide bomber drove and detonated a pick-up truck packed with 300 kg of explosives into a meeting of 600 people, killing 40 instantly and injuring 81, although the toll later rose to 110 as many died in hospitals. The attack occurred in a remote region where the injured could not get medical attention for several hours.

The attack was preceded by a row between Taliban militants and local Shia tribesmen. Angry tribesmen clashed with the Taliban the day before and destroyed the homes of militants in the area. At the time of the attack, the Ali Khel tribesmen had gathered to discuss ways to evict the Taliban from the region.

== Background ==
On 28 September, the Taliban had asked the Ali Khel tribe, the biggest and the most influential tribe in the area, and its sub-clans to leave the region because they belonged to the minority Shia community. The tribesmen initially left, although a political agent summoned a grand jirga of all 18 tribes of the Orakzai Agency on 30 September to clear the area of the Taliban by a lashkar, or local militia. The Ali Khel tribe then returned to the area where they held a jirga on 7 October to take collective action against the Taliban along with representatives of the Ahle Sunnat Wal Jamaat, which is another name for Sipah-e-Sahaba Pakistan. On 10 October, the tribesmen gathered at Khadizai village to destroy the local Taliban headquarters and homes of people sheltering the militants.

== See also ==
- List of terrorist incidents in 2008
