= Ningulai =

Ningolai
- Union Council Bara Bandai
- ننگو لئ ننګولئ
- Location within Pakistan
- Coordinates: 34.51°N 72.25°E
- Country: Pakistan
- Province: Khyber-Pakhtunkhwa
- District: Swat
- Tehsil: Kabal

Government
  - Village Nazim: Fatihullah Khan
- Elevation: 974 m (3,196 ft)

Population (2017)
  - Total: 11,793
- Time zone: UTC+5 (PST)
- Postal code: 19201

Ningolai (Urdu: ننگو لئ; Pashto: ننګولئ) is a village in Swat (Khyber Pakhtoon Khwa) Pakistan. Old name was Ningula which was named by a person name Ningula. Later it was named Ningolai by the ruler of Swat State. The people of village Ningolai belong to subsection Naikpikhel of Yusufzai the biggest and largest tribe of Pashtun tribes. The village contains a small series of mountains and a forest, residential area starting from meadows of mountains and merge with river swat on right bank, vast land for crops, number of canals, and a part of the Swat river. Mountains of the village include Usmani Ghar, Kursi Ghat, Kafar Ghat and Najia.

== Location ==
Ningolai is located at 34°51′0″N 72°25′0″E at an altitude of 974 metres (3198 feet). It is about 12 Kilometers away from Mingawara or Mingora, The main city of Swat Valley and 14 Kilometers from Saidu Sharif the Capital of the Yousufzai State of Swat (Princely State). Situated on the left bank (North side) of Suvastu or The River Swat. Shakardara is on the East, Bara Bandai and Kuza Bandai on the West.
