= 2008 Wah bombing =

Double suicide attack on the Pakistan Ordnance Factories

Coordinates: 33°28′50″N 72°25′55″E

- Location: Wah Cantonment, Pakistan
- Date: 21 August 2008 (UTC+5)
- Target: Pakistan Ordnance Factories
- Attack type: Suicide attacks
- Deaths: 70
- Injuries: 100+

The 2008 Wah bombing was a double suicide attack on the Pakistan Ordnance Factories (POF) in Wah, Pakistan, on 21 August 2008. The attack, which killed more than 100 and wounded over 200 is the deadliest on a military site in Pakistan's history. Both bombers detonated themselves at the factory's gates while workers were changing shifts.

== Background ==
The Pakistan Ordnance Factories (POF) in Wah, Pakistan, is the center of the country's defence industry. Nearly 25,000 workers are employed there to produce explosives, weapons and other conventional arms and ammunition.

Since July 2007, the northwest region of Pakistan, has been the site of a wave of militant violence, in which hundreds of militants and Pakistani security force members have been killed. Violence in the region had subsided after the new coalition government, which came to power after the February 2008 general election, had begun talks with tribal leader Baitullah Mehsud. However, violence resumed when Mehsud suspended talks in June. Following an impeachment movement launched by major opposition parties, the President of Pakistan Pervez Musharraf resigned on 18 August 2008, ending his nine years as head of the country.

== Responsibility ==
Maulvi Omar, a spokesman for the Pakistani Taliban, said his group the Tehrik-e-Taliban had carried out the attacks, which he said were in response to military operations against militants in the Bajaur region which began on 6 August 2008 and has cost the lives of perhaps hundreds of civilians and forced some 300,000 people to flee from their homes. He warned that if the Pakistani government continues operations there, "we will continue such attacks". He further stated that the "Wah factory is a killer factory where arms are being produced to kill our women and children."

A third bomber, Hamidullah did not carry out his attack and was subsequently arrested.

== Government response ==
In a message, Dr Fahmida Mirza, Speaker of the National Assembly, and Faisal Karim Kundi, Deputy Speaker, said it was a barbaric act of terrorism, which reflected inhumane and callous nature of the perpetrators. They said that a few misguided people were trying to disrupt peace in the country and derail the peaceful democratic process but they will not succeed in their nefarious designs. They said the criminals behind attacks were playing with the lives of innocent people without realising that they cannot save themselves from the wrath of Allah.

The United Nations Security Council met to officially condemn the terrorist attacks.

== See also ==
- List of terrorist incidents in 2008
- Pakistan Ordnance Factories explosion
