= 2009 Jamrud mosque bombing =

Terrorist incident in Pakistan

27 March 2009 FATA Mosque attack
- Location: Jamrud, FATA, Pakistan
- Date: 27 March 2009 (UTC+05.00)
- Attack type: Suicide bombing
- Weapon: Bomb
- Deaths: 48–70
- Injuries: 100
- Perpetrator: unknown

The 2009 Jamrud mosque bombing occurred on 27 March 2009, in Jamrud, Pakistan in the Khyber Agency of the Federally Administered Tribal Areas during Friday prayers. The local police immediately claimed a casualty count of 48 while adding that the death toll could reach as high as 70. A hundred wounded were also taken to hospital. It was reported that about 250 worshippers were present during prayer time.

== Background ==
Jamrud (Urdu: جمرود) is a town located in the Khyber Agency, one of the Federally Administered Tribal Areas of Pakistan. The town is of strategic importance, as the doorway to the Khyber Pass, part of the Hindu Kush range, which leads into Afghanistan. The Khyber Pass has been a principal route for resupplying NATO forces in the current Afghan theatre of conflict. In February 2009, a bridge 15 miles northwest of Peshawar was blown up by militants presumably sympathetic to or sponsored by the Taliban.

The bombing of the Jamrud mosque came at a time of increased uncertainty in Pakistan following a high-profile attack on the Sri Lankan cricket team as well as more tense moments as former PM Nawaz Sharif threatened to join the lawyers' Long March to Islamabad although he had been placed under 'house arrest at his family's compound Raiwind, with the stated aim of reinstating the sacked Chief Justice Iftikhar Choudhary as promised, although this calls for a new "revolution" was also a direct response to, his being barred, along with his brother, from ever running for any government office again, and the consequent dismissal of the Punjab government led by his brother. There was also talk of an increased American drone bombing campaign into other areas of Pakistan.

Al Jazeera English reported that "rising violence in Pakistan's northwest [was] fueling doubts about the country's ability to counter Taliban and al-Qaeda fighters." Jamrud also lies in the Khyber region, where fighters have intensified attacks on lorries carrying supplies to NATO and US forces in Afghanistan.

This attack came a day after at least 11 people were killed at a restaurant in the same northwest region in the Jandola district of South Waziristan.

=== Follow-up ===
The next day a supply base for NATO troops was attacked and 12 containers were damaged.

== Attack ==
The attack occurred just after the muezzin's call to prayer. As a result of the attack the upper floor of the mosque collapsed on the worshippers below. A photo showed that three columns supporting a beam connected to the Mosque's Minarettes at either side of the structure was all that remained of the Mosque.

== Responsibility ==
Though there was no immediate claim of responsibility, other details have raised speculation. The mosque is near a police checkpoint where "people in that checkpoint usually pray in this mosque"; there were rumours that suggested foreign hands were responsible. A tribal policeman also made an early claim that pro-Taliban fighters were guilty of carrying out the bombing after a recent offensive aimed in part at protecting a supply route for NATO and US troops operating in Afghanistan. He said that "Residents of this area had co-operated and helped us a lot. These infidels had warned that they will take revenge. They are the enemy of Pakistan. They are the enemy of Islam."

A report said a commander of Tehrik-i-Taliban Pakistan's Khyber Agency chapter had warned through the media of attacks if the security forces did not vacate the Frontier Corps checkposts in Jamrud and Landikotal by 20 February. Khassadars at the village of Bagyari (the site of the blast) told reporters that a Taliban commander Nazeer Afridi from the Sepah tribe in Bara had issued the warning through letters, saying they would not allow the Peshawar-Torkham route to be used by vehicles carrying supplies for Nato forces in Afghanistan. Afghanistan-bound Nato convoys and truck terminals in Peshawar and Khyber Agency have been attacked in recent months.

== Reaction ==
Pakistan President Asif Ali Zardari and Prime Minister Yousuf Raza Gilani "strongly condemned the suicide attack" while vowing that the perpetrators would be brought to justice. Asfandyar Wali Khan was quoted as saying 'The bomber and his operatives have once again demonstrated that this is not a war for Islam and Shariah, this is not jihad, but war against humanity.'

== See also ==
- Violence in Pakistan 2006–09, table and map providing overview of all violence in Pakistan between 2006 and 2009.
