= Nikpikhel =

Naikpikhel (also Nekbikhel Pashto: نیکپی خیل') is a sub clan of Yousafzai Pashtun in Swat residing in the surrounding area of Tehsil Kabal, Swat lying just opposite to Mingora (Mingawara) on the western bank of River Swat, Swat, Khyber Pakhtunkhwa, Pakistan.

== Ethnicity ==
Naikpikhel belongs to Yousafzai branch of Pashtuns and further expanded to the family tree from Malak Yousaf (Yousafzai) to Aku (Aku Zai). From the first wife of Aku (Aku Zai) namely 'Gouhara', we have four sons which form the tree to four sub tribes as 1. Baizai, 2. Khwaja Zai, 3. Aba Zai, 4. Khadak Zai.

Khwaja Zai is expended to Mali Zai, Sujni, Shami Zai, Naikpi Khel, Shamo Zai, Aden Zai.

== Etymology ==
The name is a portmanteau of Nikpi (نیکپی), which is Pashto for "fortunate", and khel (خیل), which is Pashto for "tribe" or "clan".

== Naikpi Khel Sub Khel (Tribe/Clan) ==
The Nikpikhel are divided into Four Sub clans, Aba Khel, Aisha Khel, Sheikh Sena and Musa. The Aisha khel comprises villages named Kanju, Dherai, Damghar, Kuza Bandai, Momdherai, Sigram, Lalu Bandai, Kamar Bandai, Jut Kot, Maloka, Bara Bandai, Ghorijo, Delay, Ningolai.

Aba Khel is divided into Bar ("upper") Aba Khel and Koz ("lower") Aba Khel. Koz Aba Khel includes Dedahara, Gadi, Dagay, Kotlai, Akhud Kilay, Kabal, Hazara, Aligrama and Malooch. Bar Aba Khel includes Sirsinai, Kalakalay, Totano Bandai, Manja, Golden, Devlai, Nasrat, Shahdeari, Samai, Maira, Tall, [Dardyal], kamkhwalai, chur, penawrhai and Kamyari.

Bar Aba Khel is divided into three clans or tribes: Mata Khel, Zaina Khel, and Sahib Khel.

Mata Khel sub clan are Karam Ali Khel (Karmali Khel), Maryam Khel, Saran Khel, Fatwa Khel, Jora Khel, Khusal Khel, Bemi Khel, Ranjo Khel, and wasli Khattak (Khattak Khel) reside in Shahderai, Hazara, Totano Bandai (Totanobandai), Golden, Manja and Dardyal.

Zaina Khel sub clan are Merwais Khel, Usman Khel; Merwais Khel is further expanded to Sheda Khel, Umer Khel, Painda Khel, Musa Khel. Usman Khel is further divided into Jogi Khel, Nemat Khel, Baba Khel and Hasan Ali Khel.

Sahib Khel is further divided into sub khel's like Mamo Khel (Mamo Khel sub Khel are Bado khel (Bado Khel sub khel is sherren khel), Mansaf Khel, Wali Khel, baro khel), Bostan Khel, Baro Khel (Baro Khel sub khel is Ayoub Khel) (One sub khel of Ayoub Khel is Pinj Khel and they mainly live in Sirsinai), Syed khan khel, Dolat Khan Khel and Shabor Khel which are based in Devlai, Golden, Nasrat, Shalhand, Tagma, Malakana and Sirsinai. The graves of Baro baba Barokhel famous as (Zyara Baba) and Khushal baba KhushalKhel are situated in Sirsinai.

Musa has only two sub khel according to Shajara namely Sar Abdal and Bakhti.

Aisha Khel is divided in three sub clans Zubar Khel, Khudai Khel and Dado Khel. Zubar Khel has further family tree of Rama Khel, Nemat Khel, Pai Khel and Khata Khel (khata Khel is divided into Khani khel, Shamshi Khel, Adro/doru Khel, Shekhan/shahikhan khel) are based in Kanju, Hazara, aligrama, totano bandai .Khudai Khel to Babokar Khel, Umer Khan khel, Zaal Khel, Mian Khan Khel . Dado Khel to Ali Khan Khel, Aibo Khel, Manki Khel, Jogi Khel, Ghali khel, Nasar Khel and Mandanr khel.(maloch wal)originally this clans belong to shamozo area then they have migrated from maloch village to Bara Bandai.the same manner Ali Khan Khel, is further expended to Audal Khel, Adam Khel, Bucha Khel, Bara Khan Khel, Saido Khel and Sultan Khel. While Nasir Khel is further expanded to Shado Khel, Shado Khel, Mandarn Khel, Ajo Khel and Tawas Khel.

Sheikh Sena has no such further sub khel information.

== See also ==
Gul Muhammad
