= Provincially Administered Tribal Areas =

Former administrative subdivision of Pakistan

The Provincially Administered Tribal Area (PATA) was the former administrative subdivision of Pakistan designated in the Article 246(b) of the Constitution of Pakistan. No Act of Provincial Assembly can be applied to PATA whereas the Governor of the respective province has a mandate parallel to the authority President of Pakistan has over Federally Administered Tribal Areas. In 2018, a Twenty-fifth Amendment to the Constitution of Pakistan merged PATA, as well as FATA into full control of the Khyber-Paktunkhwa government, thus the PATA designation has no legal standing in the future of Khyber-Paktunkhwa.

Provincially Administered Tribal Areas as defined in the Constitution include four former princely states as well as tribal areas and tribal territories in districts:

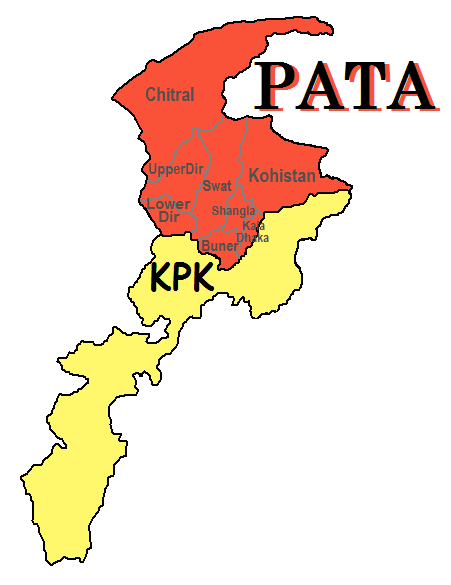
Provincially Administered Tribal Areas-NWFP

- Khyber-Pakhtunkhwa
  - Upper Chitral District (former Chitral state)
  - Lower Chitral District (former Chitral state)
  - Upper Dir District (former Dir state)
  - Lower Dir District (former Dir state)
  - Swat District (former Swat state including Kalam)
  - Buner District (former Swat state)
  - Shangla District (former Swat state)
  - Kohistan District (former Swat state)
  - Malakand
  - Amb state (now in Swabi District)
  - Torghar District (previously known as Kala Dhaka)
  - Tribal Area adjoining Battagram District (Battagram, Allai and Upper Tanawalormer)

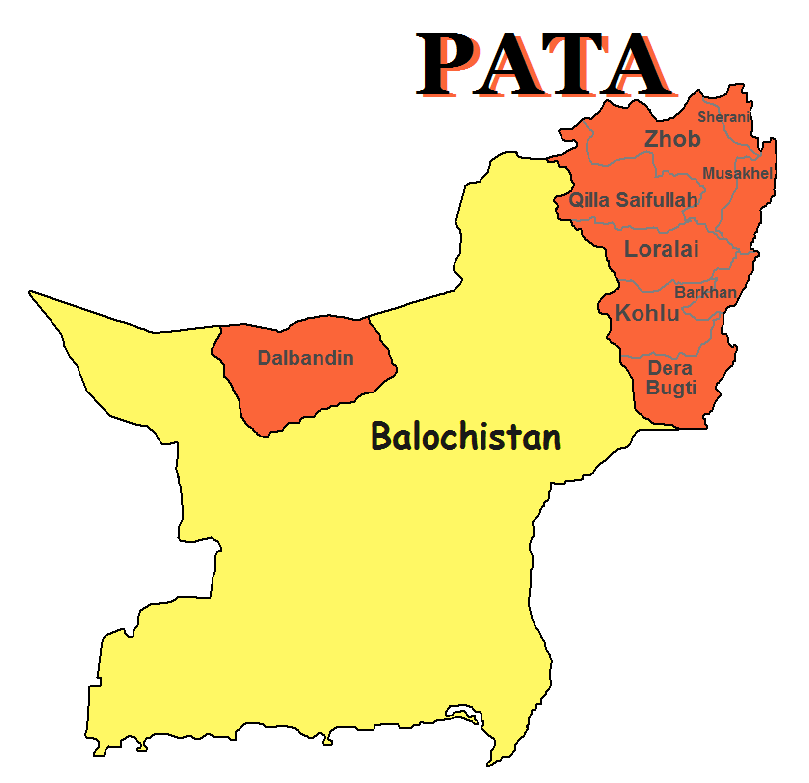
Provincially Administered Tribal Areas-Balochistan

- Balochistan
  - Zhob District
  - Killa Saifullah District
  - Musakhel District
  - Sherani District
  - Loralai District
  - Duki District
  - Barkhan District
  - Kohlu District
  - Dera Bugti District
  - Dalbandin Tehsil of Chagai District

== See also ==
- Federally Administered Tribal Areas
