= 2008 Times Square bombing =

Bomb explosion

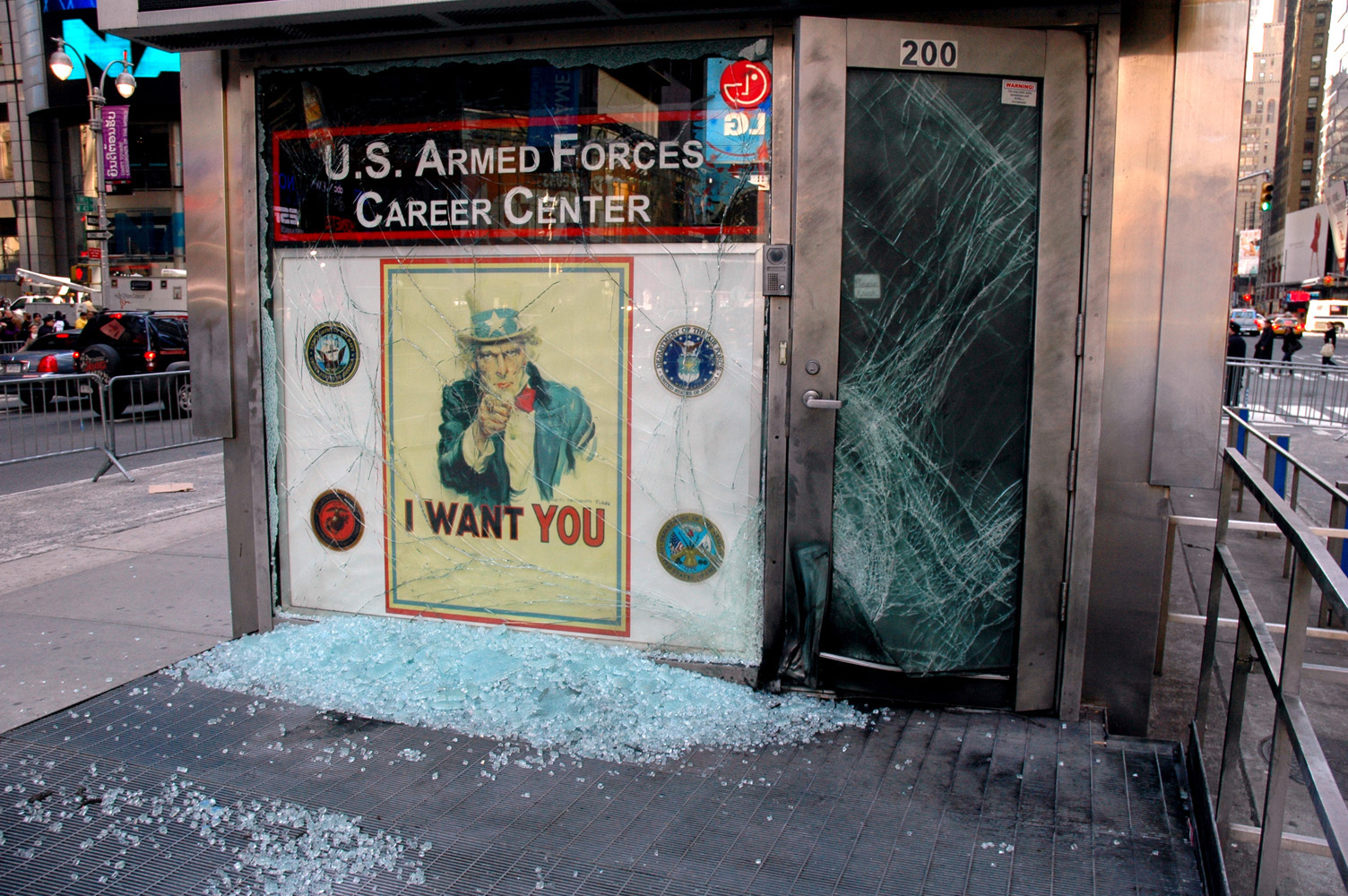
- The bomb shattered the window and door of the recruiting center
- Location: 40°45′24.73″N 73°59′10.28″W; Times Square, New York City
- Date: March 6, 2008; 3:43 a.m (UTC-5)
- Attack type: Bombing
- Deaths: 0
- Injuries: 0
- Perpetrator: Unidentified

On the morning of March 6, 2008, an unknown individual placed a small bomb in front of a United States Armed Forces recruiting station in Times Square, located in Midtown Manhattan in New York City. There were no injuries. A security camera shows the bomber riding a bicycle as he approaches the station, dismounting the bike and planting the bomb, and then speeding off shortly before the blast.

Despite 15 years of investigation, authorities have not identified a suspect in the case. Investigators have suggested the bombing may be linked to two previous unsolved bombings in New York City: one at the British consulate in 2005 and Mexican consulate in 2007.

== Incident ==
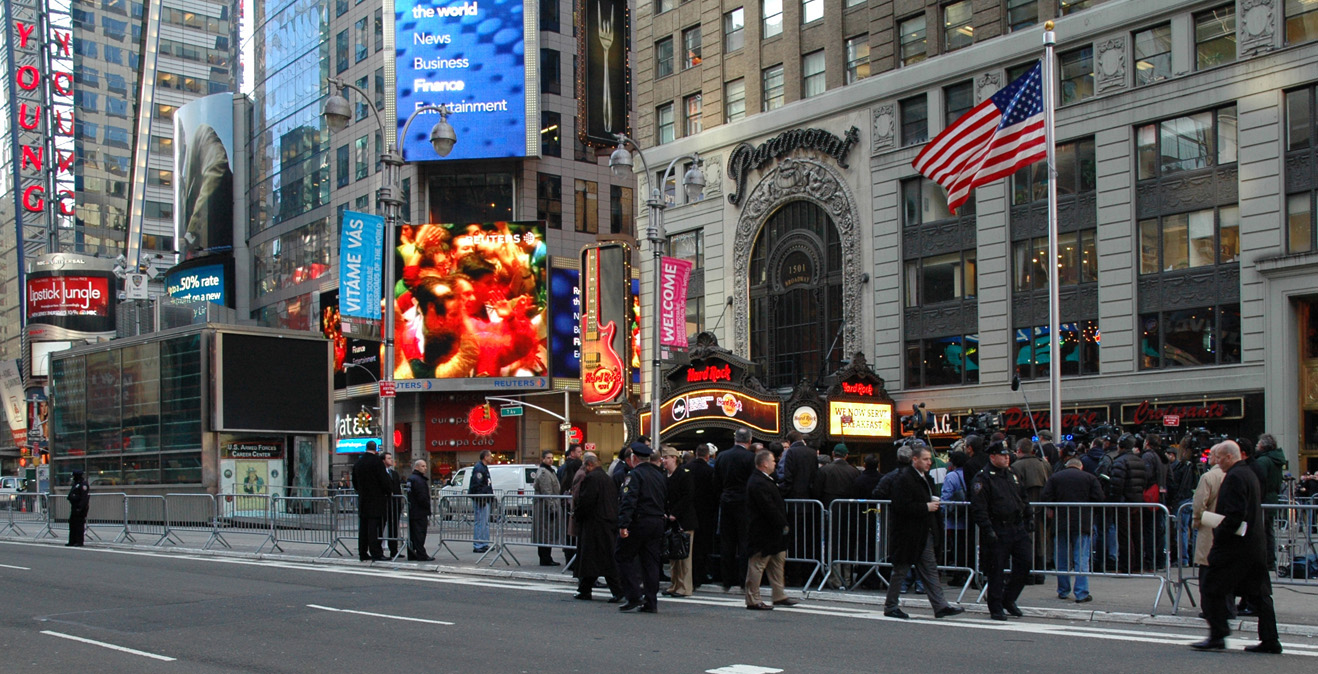
Media gathers after the bombing.

The bombing took place at around 3:43 a.m. in front of a United States Armed Forces recruiting station in Times Square. A security camera mounted at 1501 Broadway shows an individual riding a bicycle eastbound on 38th Street and Madison Avenue. He headed toward the recruiting center, putting himself out of camera view. He then placed an improvised explosive device in front of the building, and left the area on a bicycle, reappearing on camera.

The bomber was seen riding a bicycle wearing a grey hooded jacket and a backpack, and was described as a "large" man. Retired New York City detective Ray Pierce suggested he may be a bicycle messenger, noting the "comfortable" way he is seen riding his bicycle.

== Investigation ==
=== Bicycle ===
A 1980s blue 10-speed Ross bicycle was found by construction workers in a dumpster located on East 38th Street near Madison Avenue. Unaware of the bombing, several of the workers rode around on the bicycle, which made it harder for investigators to obtain fingerprints. After they heard about the bombing, they turned the bicycle over to the police. Investigators identified the bicycle found in the dumpster, a short distance from the recruiting station, to be the one used by the bomber.

Fingerprints lifted from the bicycle ended up having "no value" in figuring out the identity of the bomber. The bicycle was manufactured and sold in the 1980s at a store called "Yonkers Cycle Center" located in Westchester County, New York. The store has since been closed down and the owner has died. Investigators believed the bicycle may have recently changed owners, as one investigator stated "someone may have sold it at a yard sale". Investigators believe the bicycle was stored indoors for most of the time.

=== Bomb ===
New York City Police Commissioner Ray Kelly described the bomb as "low-order explosive" and "not a particularly sophisticated device" contained in a green ammunition box. The ammunition can was "filled halfway with black powder" and a time fuse was used for detonation.

=== FBI investigation ===
The FBI-led New York Joint Terrorism Task Force continues to investigate the case. Over 15 years of investigation, several persons of interest were investigated, but no suspect has been identified. According to the FBI, the bomber may have been aided by up to five other people in Times Square during the attack, comprising a lookout or surveillance team.

In 2013, the FBI released new video footage of the purported bomber, and announced that a $65,000 reward would be given to anyone who could provide information leading to the bomber's identification, arrest and conviction. The reward was increased to $115,000 in April 2015, and was increased to $250,000 in March 2023.

== Possible connection to 2005 British consulate bombing and 2007 Mexican consulate bombing ==
The FBI has said that the bombing may be linked to two previous unsolved bombings in New York City: one at the British consulate in 2005 and Mexican consulate in 2007. The components of the bombs in all three attacks were similar, and the consulate bombings, like the 2008 attack on the Times Square recruitment station, involved a bicyclist who threw an explosive between 3 a.m. and 4 a.m.

== Leads that were ruled out ==
An early morning explosion at an Upper East Side Starbucks in May 2009 was determined to be unrelated to the Times Square bombing of the recruitment station. The perpetrator of the Starbucks blast, age 17 at the time of the explosion, was arrested, pleaded guilty, and was sentenced in 2010.

After the bombing, investigators also revisited a separate incident that occurred on the Canada–United States border. In February 2008, four men attempted to cross the border into Canada from New York. While they were being questioned by Canadian border agents, one of the men fled from the car, getting away. He left behind a backpack, inside of which pictures of New York City locations were found, including at least one picture of the Times Square recruiting center. A senior U.S. government official also told CNN that "anarchist-type material" was found in the car. However, U.S. authorities did not find any evidence of criminal activity, and investigators have not linked the bombing to the border incident. A U.S. government official has stated he strongly doubts a link between the border incident and bombing will be found, noting that the recruiting center is in a prominent location in Times Square and would most likely appear in pictures taken at Times Square.

Hours after the bombing, Democratic Party members of Capitol Hill received letters that contained the words "Happy New Year, We did it" and a picture of a man standing in front of the Times Square recruiting center. The letters also included a 64-page anti-Iraq War statement. After investigating the letters, interrogating the author, and searching his home, authorities proved that the letter was unrelated to the incident and a coincidence. The letters were sent weeks before the bombing occurred.

== Response ==
Mayor Michael Bloomberg, Police Commissioner Raymond Kelly and Federal Bureau of Investigation officials appeared later in the morning in a joint news conference. Mayor Bloomberg denounced the attack and said that it "insults every one of our brave men and women in uniform stationed around the world.”

John McCain’s presidential campaign released a statement after the bombing:

The attempted attack that happened in New York City this morning when someone tried to harm a recruiting station in Times Square is unacceptable in America. I know Mayor Bloomberg as well as other law enforcement agencies are actively working, and I have been assured a full investigation is taking place and hope they bring the individuals to justice as quickly as possible. We cannot allow this to happen to the men and women serving in our military whether they are at home or abroad.

Presidential candidate Hillary Clinton also commented on the bombing:

I am deeply concerned by the detonation of a small bomb at the military recruiting office in Times Square. While we should be grateful that there were no injuries and minimal damage, there is an ongoing investigation into whether the attack is linked to foreign terrorist groups, and federal, state, and city authorities should be given every resource and every tool to swiftly complete that investigation. Having worked with and supported our law enforcement and national security authorities in New York, I am confident that they will get the job done. Whatever else we learn about this attack, it is a reminder of the threats we continue to face at home and the importance of remaining vigilant.

== See also ==
- 2010 Times Square car bomb attempt
- Terrorism in the United States
