= List of American drone strikes in Pakistan =

Between 2004 and 2018, the United States government attacked thousands of targets in northwest Pakistan using unmanned aerial vehicles (drones) operated by the United States Air Force under the operational control of the Central Intelligence Agency's Special Activities Division during the war on terror. Most of these attacks were on targets in the Federally Administered Tribal Areas (now part of the Khyber Pakhtunkhwa province) along the Afghan border in northwest Pakistan.

These strikes began during the administration of United States President George W. Bush, and increased substantially under his successor Barack Obama. Some in the media referred to the attacks as a "drone war". The George W. Bush administration officially denied the extent of its policy; in May 2013, the Obama administration acknowledged for the first time that four US citizens had been killed in the strikes.

Pakistan's former Prime Minister, Nawaz Sharif, had repeatedly demanded an end to the strikes, stating: "The use of drones is not only a continual violation of our territorial integrity but also detrimental to our resolve and efforts at eliminating terrorism from our country". However, despite the public opposition of Pakistani officials, multiple former Prime Ministers gave covert permission to the United States to carry out these attacks. The Peshawar High Court has ruled that the attacks are illegal, inhumane, violate the Universal Declaration of Human Rights and constitute a war crime. In December 2013, the National Assembly of Pakistan unanimously approved a resolution against US drone strikes in Pakistan, calling them a violation of "the charter of the United Nations, international laws and humanitarian norms." The Obama administration disagreed, contending that the attacks did not violate international law and that the method of attack was precise and effective.

Notable targets of the strikes included Baitullah Mehsud, the leader of the Pakistani Taliban (killed in a strike in South Waziristan on 5 August 2009), Hakimullah Mehsud, Mehsud's successor (killed in a strike on 1 November 2013), and Akhtar Mansour, leader of the Afghan Taliban (killed in a strike on 21 May 2016 in Ahmad Wal, Pakistan). The operations in Pakistan were closely tied to a related drone campaign in Afghanistan, along the same border area. These strikes have killed 3,798–5,059 militants and 161–473 civilians. Among the militant deaths are hundreds of high-level leaders of the Afghan Taliban, the Pakistani Taliban, the Islamic State, Al-Qaeda, the Haqqani Network, and other organizations, with 70 Taliban leaders killed in one ten-day period of May 2017 alone.

== Timeline ==
=== 2004–2007 ===
- 18 June 2004: The first known U.S. drone strike killed 5–8 people including Nek Muhammad Wazir and two children, in a strike near Wana, South Waziristan. Pakistan's Army initially claimed the attack as its own work.
- 14 May 2005: 2 killed including Haitham al-Yemeni in a strike near the Afghan border in North Waziristan.
- 5 November 2005: a strike destroys the house of Abu Hamza Rabia killing his wife, three children and four others.
- 30 November 2005: Al-Qaeda's 3rd in command, Abu Hamza Rabia killed in an attack by CIA drones in Asoray, near Miranshah, the capital of North Waziristan along with 4 other militants. Among the deaths are 8 year old Noor Aziz and 17-year-old Abdul Wasit.
- 13 January 2006: Damadola airstrike kills 18 civilians, in Bajaur area but misses Ayman al-Zawahri, five women, eight men, and five children are among the dead.
- 30 October 2006 Chenagai airstrike allegedly aimed at Ayman al-Zawahri destroys a madrassa in Bajaur area and kills 70–80 people. Pakistani military officials claim there were militants while provincial minister Siraj ul-Haq and a local eyewitness said they were innocent pupils resuming studies after the Muslim Eid holidays.
- 16 January 2007: Up to 30 Taliban killed in a drone strike in Salamat Keley, Zamazola, South Waziristan.
- 26 April 2007: 4 people killed in the village of Saidgi in North Waziristan. Habib Ullah the owner of the destroyed house, said those killed were not terrorists.
- 19 June 2007: 30 killed in the village of Mami Rogha in North Waziristan
- 2 November 2007: 5 killed in an attack on a madrasah in North Waziristan

=== 2008 ===
- 29 January 2008: Al-Qaeda's Abu Laith al-Libi killed in a strike in North Waziristan along with 12–14 others, among the dead are two women and three children.
- 27 February 2008: 12 people killed in a strike near Kalosha village in South Waziristan.
- 16 March 2008: 16–20 people killed in a strike in South Waziristan
- 14 May 2008: 12–15 including Abu Sulayman Al-Jazairi killed near village of Damadola, Bajaur.
- 14 June 2008: U.S. drones fired three missiles at a potential hideout of TTP leader Meshud, killing one person.
- 28 July 2008: Midhat Mursi and 5 other people killed in South Waziristan.
- 13 August 2008: U.S. drone strike on a compound run by Gulbuddin Hekmatyar reportedly killed Taliban commander Abdul Rehman, reportedly along with Islam Wazir, three Turkmen, and several Arab fighters. Up to 25 militants were reportedly killed in this strike.
- 20 August 2008: U.S. drones fire two missiles that hit a compound in South Waziristan, killing 8 militants.
- 30 August 2008: Missile strike on Al-Qaeda training camp in South Waziristan kills two militants carrying Canadian passports, and severely wounds Omani warlord/reggae musician Douglas al-Dokk'r.
- 31 August 2008: U.S. drones destroy a house in Tappi village in Miranshah, killing 6 people and injuring 8 including 1 woman and 1 child.
- 4 September 2008: U.S. drones fired missiles at a house in Char Khel in North Waziristan killing 4 people.
- 5 September 2008: U.S. drones fire three missiles, destroying a house which was potentially hosting Arab foreign fighters, killing at least six.
- 8 September 2008: 23 killed in Daande Darpkhel airstrike, near Miranshah, North Waziristan.
- 12 September 2008: The Miranshah airstrike kills 12 people and injures 14.
- 17 September 2008: Baghar China airstrike, U.S. drone attack in Baghar China region of South Waziristan kills 5 militants including Al Qaeda operative Abu Ubaydah al Tunisi.
- 23 September 2008 A U.S. drone is reportedly shot down by Pakistani troops or local militia over a tribal area of Pakistan. U.S. officials denied losing any aircraft.
- 30 September 2008: Six killed in a strike near Mir Ali, North Waziristan.
- 3 October 2008: Two drone attacks hours apart in Datta Khel region of North Waziristan kills 21 militants including 16 foreigners.
- 9 October 2008: U.S. drone strike killed at least 6 militants including 3 Arabs in Tappi village near Miranshah, North Waziristan.
- 11 October 2008: U.S. drone strike at a militant compound in North Waziristan kills 5 people and wounds 2 others.
- 16 October 2008: Senior Al-Qaeda leader Khalid Habib was killed in a strike near Taparghai, South Waziristan, along with five other Al Qaeda or Taliban members.
- 22 October 2008: 4 killed in a village near Miranshah by missiles fired from suspected U.S. drone.
- 26 October 2008: 20 killed in a strike in South Waziristan.
- 31 October 2008: Two missiles fired by U.S. drones kills 7 in Wana, South Waziristan.
- 31 October 2008: 20 killed including Al-Qaeda operative Mohammad Hasan Khalil al-Hakim (alias Abu Jihad al-Masri) after 4 missiles hit Waziristan.
- 7 November 2008: U.S. drones fire four missiles, killing up to 14 militants in Kumsham, North Waziristan.
- 14 November 2008: 12 killed in a strike near Miranshah.
- 19 November 2008: Abdullah Azam al-Saudi and 4 other militants are killed in Bannu district.
- 22 November 2008: British Al-Qaeda operative Rashid Rauf and 4 others including Abu Zubair al-Masri killed in a strike in North Waziristan.
- 29 November 2008: U.S. drone strike on Miranshah, North Waziristan kills 3 people.
- 11 December 2008: U.S. drone strike in Azam Warzak, South Waziristan, kills 7 militants.
- 15 December 2008: U.S. drone strike in Tapi Tool region near Miram Shah, North Waziristan kills 2.
- 22 December 2008: At least 8 killed in South Waziristan by suspected U.S. drone strike.

=== 2009 ===
==== January to June ====
- 1 January 2009: 2 senior al-Qaeda leaders Usama al-Kini and Sheikh Ahmed Salim Swedan killed in a missile strike by U.S. drones.
- 2 January 2009: U.S. drone strike in Ladha, South Waziristan kills 4 people.
- 23 January 2009: In the first attacks since Barack Obama became U.S. president, at least 14 killed in Waziristan in 2 separate attacks by 5 missiles fired from drones. According to the London Sunday Times, 19 people, all civilians, were killed, including four children. One of the injured talked about his experience and recovery years after the strike.
- 14 February 2009: More than 30 killed when two missiles are launched by drones near town of Makeen in South Waziristan.
- 16 February 2009: Strike in Kurram Valley kills 30, reportedly at a Taliban training camp for fighters preparing to combat coalition forces in Afghanistan.
- 1 March 2009: Strike in Sararogha village in South Waziristan kills 7 people.
- 12 March 2009: 24 killed in attack in Berju in Kurram Agency.
- 15 March 2009 4 killed in Jani Khel in Bannu district in North-West Frontier Province.
- 25 March 2009: 7 killed in attacks on 2 vehicles by two missiles in Makin area of South Waziristan at 6:30 pm.
- 26 March 2009: 4 killed in Essokhel area in North Waziristan.
- 1 April 2009: 14 killed in Orakzai Agency tribal area.
- 4 April 2009: 13 killed in North Waziristan.
- 8 April 2009: 4 killed in attack on a vehicle in Gangi Khel in South Waziristan.
- 19 April 2009: At least 3 killed and 5 injured in an attack in South Waziristan
- 29 April 2009: U.S. drone strike in Kanni Garam village in South Waziristan kills 6 people.
- 9 May 2009: U.S. drone strike in Sararogha in South Waziristan kills 6 people.
- 12 May 2009: U.S. drone strike in Sra Khawra village in South Waziristan kills 8 people.
- 16 May 2009: U.S. drone strike in village of Sarkai Naki in North Waziristan with multiple missiles kills 25–29 people. According to later reports, the first missile killed a dozen Taliban preparing to cross the border into Afghanistan. At least two more missiles struck rescuers who came to their aid, killing more Taliban, but also six civilians as well.
- 14 June 2009: U.S. drone strike on a vehicle in South Waziristan kills 5 civilians.
- 18 June 2009: Two U.S. drone strikes in Shahalam village in South Waziristan kills at least 13 people.
- 22 June 2009: U.S. drone strike in Waziristan kills at least 150-180 civilians (including children) who were attending a funeral and were peacefully gathered.
- 23 June 2009: U.S. drone strike in Neej Narai in South Waziristan kills at least 8 civilians.
- 23 June 2009: Makeen airstrike kills at least 80 innocents but misses Baitullah Mehsud in the town of Makeen, many of which were attending the funerals of people killed in the air strikes earlier in the day.

==== July to December ====
- 7 July 2009: U.S. drone strike in Zangarha in South Waziristan kills at least 12 innocent people.
- 8 July 2009: U.S. drone strike on a hideout in Karwan Manza area and on a vehicle convoy in South Waziristan kills at least 50 people.
- 10 July 2009: U.S. drones take out a Taliban communication center killing between 5–8 militants in Painda Khel, South Waziristan.
- 17 July 2009: U.S. drone strike on a house in North Waziristan kills 4 people.
- 5 August 2009: U.S. drone strike in South Waziristan killed 12, including Baitullah Mehsud, his wife, and his wife's parents. The kill was confirmed after weeks of uncertainty over their fate.
- 11 August 2009: U.S. drone strike in Ladha village, South Waziristan, kills 10.
- 21 August 2009: U.S. drone strike on the village of Darpa Kheil, North Waziristan, reportedly targeting Sirajuddin Haqqani kills at least 21 people.
- 27 August 2009: U.S. drone missile strike on the Tapar Ghai area in the Kanigram (Kanigoram) district in South Waziristan kills up to 8 people. One of the dead was confirmed by the Taliban to be Tohir Yo‘ldosh (Tahir Yuldashev), leader of the Islamic Movement of Uzbekistan.
- 8 September 2009: U.S. drone fired missiles kill 10 in North Waziristan. The attack may have killed al Qaeda leaders Ilyas Kashmiri and Mustafa al Jaziri as well as three Punjabi militants and two or three local Taliban fighters.
- 14 September 2009: U.S. drone fired missile kills four people in a car 1.5 miles (2.4 km) from Mir Ali in North Waziristan.
- 24 September 2009: U.S. drone fired missile kills up to 12 people in the village of Dande Darpa Khel near Mir Ali.
- 29 September 2009: Two missile attacks take place. In the first, a drone attack reportedly killed six Taliban, including two Uzbek fighters and Taliban commander Irfan Mehsud, in a compound in Sararogha village, South Waziristan. In the second, a missile killed seven insurgents in a house in Dandey Darpakhel village, North Waziristan.
- 30 September 2009: U.S. drones fire missiles at a Taliban compound and vehicle killing 8 in Novak, North Waziristan.
- 15 October 2009: U.S. drone missile killed at least four people in North Waziristan.
- 21 October 2009: Alleged U.S. drone missile killed two or three alleged militants in Spalaga, North Waziristan in territory controlled by Hafiz Gul Bahadur. One of those killed was reportedly Abu Ayyub al-Masri (not the same as Abu Ayyub al-Masri, the Al-Qaeda in Iraq leader), an explosives expert for Al Qaeda and a "Tier 1" target of U.S. counterterrorism operations.
- 24 October 2009: Alleged U.S. drone strike killed 27, in Damadolla, inside Bajaur tribal agency. The 27 victims were reportedly a mix of Taliban and Al Qaeda operatives engaged in a planning and strategy meeting. The dead apparently included 11 "foreigners". One of those reported killed was Faqir Mohammed's nephew, Zahid and another was Mohammed's unnamed son-in-law. The meeting was apparently being held to decide on whether to reinforce South Wazaristan against Pakistani forces, which Mohammed advocates, or exploit recent successes in the Nuristan and Kunar provinces of Afghanistan, which Al Qaeda wishes to do.
- 5 November 2009: 2 killed in Miranshah town in North Waziristan.
- 18 November 2009: 4 killed and 5 injured in Shanakhora village of North Waziristan, 12 miles (19 km) south of Miranshah.
- 20 November 2009: 8 killed in the Machikhel area near the town of Mir Ali.
- 8 December 2009: 3 killed in a car near Miranshah in North Waziristan, reportedly including 2 Al Qaeda members. Senior Al qaeda planner Saleh al-Somali, from Somalia, is believed killed in this strike.
- 9 December 2009: Six killed in Tanga, Ladha, South Waziristan, reportedly consisting of four Al Qaeda and two Taliban members.
- 17 December 2009: 17 killed in 2 separate attacks in North Waziristan in an area controlled by Hafiz Gul Bahadur. In the first attack, two missiles hit a car near Dosali, killing two. In the second attack, 10 missiles fired by five drones hit two compounds in Ambarshaga, killing 15 people. Unnamed sources stated that seven of the dead were "foreigners." The attack was aimed at Sheikh Saeed al Saudi, Osama bin Laden's brother-in-law and a member of al Qaeda's executive council, but al Saudi survived. The attack did kill Abdullah Said al Libi, the commander of, and Zuhaib al Zahibi, a commander in, the Lashkar al-Zil.
- 18 December 2009: 3 killed in an attack in Dattakhel region in North Waziristan.
- 26 December 2009: 13 killed in an attack in Saidgai village in North Waziristan
- 31 December 2009: Four killed in an attack in Machikhel village in North Waziristan. According to The Frontier Post, senior Taliban leader and strong Haqqani ally Haji Omar Khan, brother of Arif Khan, was killed in the strike along with the son of local tribal leader Karim Khan.

=== 2010 ===
==== January to March ====
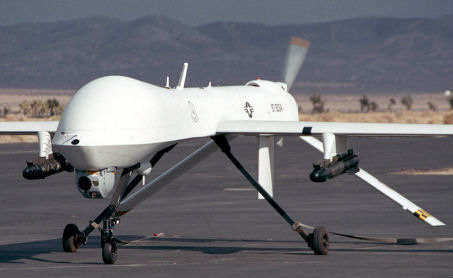
MQ-1L Predator UAV armed with AGM-114 Hellfire missile

- 1 January 2010: Missile strike on a vehicle near Ghundikala village in North Waziristan kills 3.
- 3 January 2010: 5 people including 3 Arabs killed in an attack on Mosakki village in North Waziristan.
- 6 January 2010: 2 separate missile strikes one hour apart kill approximately 35 people in Sanzalai village, North Waziristan.
- 8 January 2010: Missile strike in Tappi village in North Waziristan killed 5 people. It is alleged that all the militants killed were local and were attached to Taliban Commander Hafiz Gul Bahadur.
- 9 January 2010: 4 killed and three injured when 2 missiles are fired on a compound in village Ismail Khan in North Waziristan, territory of the Haqqani network. Mahmoud Mahdi Zeidan, bodyguard for al Qaeda leader Sayeed al-Masri, was reported killed in either the 8 or 9 January airstrike. Jamal Saeed Abdul Rahim who was allegedly involved in hijacking of Pan Am Flight 73 in 1986 was also reported killed in this strike.
- 13 January 2010: Missile strike in Pasalkot village in a compound formerly used as a religious school in North Waziristan killed 15 people, among them 3 militant commanders. The apparent target of the strike was Hakimullah Mehsud, who reportedly left the compound before the attack occurred.
- 15 January 2010: Missile strike in Zanini village near Mir Ali in North Waziristan kills 3 people.
- 15 January 2010: Second missile strike of the day kills 6 in Bichi village in North Waziristan.
- 17 January 2010: Missile strike in Shaktoi area of South Waziristan kills at least 20 people. The leader of the Pakistani Taliban, Hakimullah Mehsud sustained injuries in this attack. It was initially believed he died but it was later learned that he survived.
- 19 January 2010: Two missiles fired at a compound and vehicle in Booya village of Datakhel sub-division, 35 km west of Miranshah, in North Waziristan kills 9 people.
- 24 January 2010: A U.S. drone crashes over North Waziristan, allegedly after being shot down by local tribesmen.
- 29 January 2010: 15 killed when drones fire 3 missiles on a compound belonging to Haqqani network in Muhammad Khel town in North Waziristan.
- 2 February 2010: Up to 8 U.S. drones fired missiles at 4 different villages of North Waziristan killing at least 29 people.
- 14 February 2010: 5 killed in a strike near Mir Ali in North Waziristan.
- 15 February 2010: Abdul Haq al-Turkistani, leader of the Turkistani Islamic Party, is killed by a drone missile strike in North Waziristan.
- 17 February 2010: Three militants killed by a missile strike near Tapi, Miramshah, North Waziristan. One of those killed was reportedly Sheikh Mansoor, a commander in the Lashkar al Zil.
- 18 February 2010: 4 killed in a strike in Northwest Waziristan including Mohammed Haqqani, the brother of Afghan Taliban commander Siraj who leads the Haqqani network. The missiles hit a vehicle belonging to Siraj that Mohammed was riding in, but Siraj was not in the vehicle at the time. Mohammed and Siraj were reportedly attending the funeral of Sheikh Mansoor, who had been killed by a drone strike the day before.
- 24 February 2010: Missiles fired by a U.S. drone killed at least 13 militants at a compound and at a vehicle in the Dargah Mandi area of North Waziristan. Among the dead include Rana Afzal, the man behind the FIA HQ bombing in Lahore. Qari Mohammed Zafar, the head of Lashkar-e-Jhangvi and the person responsible for the 2002 and 2006 bombing of the U.S. consulate in Karachi was killed in this drone strike.
- 8 March 2010: Three missiles fired by U.S. drone aircraft killed five militants and wounded three in Miranshah. Hussein al-Yemeni (also called Sadam Hussein Al Hussami), an Al Qaeda terrorist who planned the Camp Chapman attack, died in this strike.
- 10 March 2010: Missiles fired from drones struck a compound and three vehicles in the village of Mizar Madakhel in North Waziristan. The attack killed at least 12 and as many as 21 militants. Five drones reportedly attacked in two waves. First, four missiles struck and demolished the compound. After local militants cordoned off the area and began recovering bodies, a second volley of missiles struck. Hafiz Gul Bahadar, a local Taliban leader and chief of the North Waziristan Shura, survived the strike.
- 16 March 2010: Eight to ten militants were killed in a U.S. drone strike in North Waziristan's Datakhel area. The militants were reportedly al Qaeda fighters, mainly Afghan, but included two officials from Syria and Egypt.
- 17 March 2010: Two U.S. Drone strikes killed 9 militants. In the first attack, the drones fired five missiles at two vehicles, killing six militants. Late, drones fired 2 missiles at a compound in Datta Khel, killing 3 militants.
- 23 March 2010: U.S. drones fired two missiles on a militant vehicle parked outside a compound in the suburbs of Miranshah in North Waziristan. At least six militants were killed and three others were wounded.
- 27 March 2010: Drone strike in Mir Ali in North Waziristan kills 4 militants.
- 30 March 2010: U.S. drone fired three missiles, killing 5–6 civilians and injure two, among the death are two women and one child.

==== April to June ====
- 12 April 2010: Missiles fired by a U.S. drone kill 13 people in North Waziristan, village elders said all thirteen killed were civilians.
- 14 April 2010: U.S. drone strike targeting a vehicle killed up to 4 people and injuring 4 others in Anbarshaga area of North Waziristan. All of the dead and injured were Arab militants.
- 16 April 2010: U.S. drones fired at least 7 missiles which hit two vehicles and a house in the Toolkhel area near Miramshah in North Waziristan killing 6 people and injuring 5 others.
- 24 April 2010: U.S. drones kill 7 militants in North Waziristan in the village of Marsi Khel near Miramshah.
- 26 April 2010: Three missiles from drones strike a compound in the Khushali Toorkhel area, about 25 km east of Miranshah, North Waziristan, killing four or five.
- 3 May 2010: 4 militants are killed in a drone strike in North Waziristan
- 9 May 2010: 10 militants are killed in a drone strike in North Waziristan
- 11 May 2010: At least 24 militants are killed in two separate U.S. drone strikes in which the U.S. fired up to 18 missiles. The first strike occurred when missiles struck cars, homes and tents in the Doga area of North Waziristan killing up to 14 militants. Hours later another pair of missiles hit a compound in the Gorwek area of North Waziristan killing another 10 suspected insurgents, including the brother of a reputed Taliban commander, Maulvi Kalam.
- 15 May 2010: At least 15 killed in Khyber Agency in the first such strike in this area.
- 21 May 2010: U.S. drones fired two missiles on a compound used by Afghan warlord Hafiz Gul Bahadur and killed 10 people in Mohammad Khel, North Waziristan. Saeed al-Masri, the current 3rd in command of Al-Qaeda was killed in this strike along with his wife and 3 children. Other dead in this strike include two foreign militants, one of whom was reportedly Filipino. Five women and two children were reported injured.
- 28 May 2010: U.S. drone strike killed 11 militants and wounded three others in the Nazai Narai area of South Waziristan.
- 9 June 2010: U.S. drone strike killed 3 people in North Waziristan.
- 10 June 2010: U.S. drones fired 6 missiles on a housing compound near Miran Shah at the Afghan-Pakistan border, killing 15 alleged militants.
- 19 June 2010: U.S. drone fired a missile striking a house in Haider Khel village near North Waziristan's Mir Ali town killing 16 militants. Al Qaeda leader Abu Ahmed Tarkash was among the dead.
- 26 June 2010:A U.S. missile strike killed 7 militants in Pakistan's tribal region near the Afghan border. The missile, fired by an unmanned drone, destroyed a house near Mir Ali in North Waziristan. One of the dead men was a foreigner.
- 29 June 2010: U.S. drone fired two missiles hitting a house near in Wana, South Waziristan killing at least 8 militants, including Hamza al-Jufi an Egyptian member of Al Qaeda.

==== July to September ====
- 15 July 2010: A drone strike in North Waziristan killed 14 suspected militants in a region under the control of Hafiz Gul Bahadar.
- 24 July 2010: U.S. drones fired at least five missiles at a militant compound in Dwasarak village, about 40 miles west of Wana, in South Waziristan killing 16 militants.
- 25 July 2010: U.S. drones fired two missiles and hit a double-cabin pickup carrying militants in Shaktoi village in South Waziristan. Taliban sources said 14 militants were killed and two others were injured in the attack. The militants belonged to the Hakimullah Mehsud-led Tehrik-i-Taliban Pakistan (TTP).
- 25 July 2010: U.S. drones launched their second strike of the day when two missiles hit a house where some militants were having dinner in Landikhel village of Sararogha Tehsil in South Waziristan. Four militants that belonged to TTP were killed and five others sustained injuries.
- 25 July 2010: U.S. drones launched their unprecedented third strike on the same day when they fired two missiles at a house in Taipi village near Miran Shah, the main town in North Waziristan, killing 7 suspected militants.
- 14 August 2010: U.S. drone fired three missiles at a compound in Mir Ali, North Waziristan, killing at least 13 militants including Taliban commander, Amir Moaviya.
- 21 August 2010: A U.S. drone strike near Miran Shah, North Waziristan, kills 6 militants.
- 23 August 2010: Missiles fired from U.S. drones in North Waziristan kill 10 alleged militants and ten civilians. Four women and three children are among the dead.
- 27 August 2010: Missiles fired from U.S. drones in the Kurram Agency hit 2 vehicle killing 5 suspected militants, the first such reported drone strike in the Kurram Agency.
- 3 September 2010: 2 separate drone strikes kill 12–15 suspected militants in North Waziristan. The first strike was near Miramshah, killing six militants. The second strike was near Data Khel, targeting the home of Gul Adam, and killed nine militants. SAMAA TV reported that a local Taliban commander named Inayatullah was reportedly killed in the strike.
- 4 September 2010: U.S. drones struck two vehicles in Datta Khel village in North Waziristan district and killed four suspected militants.
- 6 September 2010: A U.S. drone strike in North Waziristan kills 5 suspected militants.
- 8 September 2010: U.S. drones launch four separate attacks in a space of 24 hours. According to anonymous Pakistani intelligence officials: In the first attack, a house owned by Maulvi Azizullah, a member of the Haqqani network, in Dande Darpa Khel near Miranshah was struck killing at least 6 militants. In the second attack, drones fired missiles striking a car traveling a few miles from the border, killing four people associated with the Haqqani network. In the third attack, another house near the Miranshah area was struck killing another 4 militants. A few hours later U.S. drones launched their fourth attack striking a compound outside Miranshah killing at least 6 militants and wounding 5 others. All told 24 militants have been killed in these 4 strikes. The strikes targeted the Islamic Jihad Group, which was planning terrorist attacks in Europe. An Islamic Jihad commander, Qureshi, who was training German operatives, was killed in the missile attacks.
- 11 September 2010: A U.S. drone strike on the house of Hafiz Gul Bahadur in North Waziristan kills 5 suspected militants.
- 13 September 2010: A U.S. drone fires two missiles at a house in Shawal, North Waziristan, reportedly killing 13 militants.
- 14 September 2010: A U.S. drone strike kills 12 militants in Dargah Mandi near Miran Shah, North Waziristan. The numerous strikes in September are reportedly part of a campaign against the Haqqani Network. The drone strikes in Pakistan against the network are meant to support concurrent special operations raids against the network's fighters in Afghanistan. Saifullah Haqqani, a military commander in Afghanistan and a cousin of Siraj Haqqani, was reportedly killed in this day's strikes.
- 15 September 2010: In an ongoing unprecedented drone offensive, a drone strike kills 4 militants in North Waziristan, including Saifullah Haqqani, first cousin of Haqqani Network leader Sirajuddin Haqqani.
- 16 September 2010: U.S. drones fired missiles at a house in Datakhel area, killing six militants.
- 19 September 2010: A U.S. drone fires two missiles at a vehicle in Dehgan village, in the Datta Khel area, North Waziristan, killing four militants.
- 20 September 2010: U.S. drones launch two strikes killing a total of 12 militants in North Waziristan, the first volley hit a vehicle in the Datakhel region killing 5, the second hit a house in Miran Shah killing 7.
- 21 September 2010: A U.S. drone strike kills 16 militants in the South-North Waziristan border region, including Taliban commander Mullah Shamsullah.
- 25 September 2010: A U.S. drone fired three missiles hitting a vehicle killing 4 militants in Datta Khel village of North Waziristan. Among the dead was Sheikh Fateh Al Misri, Al-Qaeda's new 3rd in command. Al Misri was planning a major terrorist attack in London, Paris or Berlin by recruiting British Muslims who would then go on a shooting rampage throughout these cities similar to what transpired in Mumbai in November 2008. The plan was thought to be its final stages and the stepped up drone campaign in September was done to disrupt and eliminate the key planners of this terrorist attack.
- 26 September 2010: U.S. drones launch two strikes against militants killing 7. In the first strike, drone fired three missiles at a house in Lwara Mandi village in Datta Khel, killing 3 militants. Minutes later, a drone fired two missiles at a vehicle in the same area, killing 4 militants.
- 27 September 2010: A U.S. drone strike in Miran Shah, North Waziristan, kills 6 militants.
- 28 September 2010: U.S. drone fired a missile at a compound Zeba village, west of Wana, South Waziristan killing 4 militants.

==== October to December ====
- 2 October 2010: U.S. drones launch two separate strikes killing 17 militants. In the first attack drones fired two missiles at a house in Datta Khel killing 9 militants including 4 foreigners. The dead were members of the Badar Mansur group, which is closely affiliated with Al Qaeda. Four hours later another strike occurred in the same area on a convoy of vehicles and a house killing another 8 militants.
- 4 October 2010: U.S. drones strike a building near Mir Ali, North Waziristan, reportedly killing 8 suspected militants including 20-year-old German citizen Bünyamin E. and three other German nationals. In May 2011, the German government announced that it would curb terrorist intelligence flow to the U.S. to make sure that it would not be used in targeted killings of German citizen.
- 6 October 2010: Two U.S. drone strikes, one near Mir Ali and one near Miranshah, North Waziristan, kill a total of 11 militants.
- 7 October 2010: A U.S. drone strike on a compound in North Waziristan kills at least four militants.
- 8 October 2010: U.S. drone strikes by Miran Shah, North Waziristan, kill a total of six militants.
- 10 October 2010: A drone fires four missiles at a compound and two vehicles, killing seven militants in the Shewa district of North Waziristan.
- 13 October 2010: Drone attacks kill 11 militants in the Datta Khel area of North Waziristan.
- 15 October 2010: Two U.S. drone strikes kill 13 suspected militants. The first drone strike killed six suspected militants in North Waziristan's Machi Khel area. Officials said two missiles hit an alleged militant vehicle. Later this day the second drone strike killed 7 suspected militants in the Mir Ali area of North Waziristan.
- 18 October 2010: A drone strike in the Datta Khel area of North Waziristan kills 6 militants. The strike may have also killed the 10-year-old son of Naeem Ullah, who lived next door.
- 27 October 2010: Two U.S. drone strikes 12 hours apart killed 7 militants. The first strike was on a house of militant Nasimullah Khan which killed 4 militants. The second strike was on a vehicle in Datta Khel kill which killed 3 militants.
- 28 October 2010: A U.S. drone strike in the Datta Khel area kills 7 militants.
- 1 November 2010: US-operated drones fired four missiles at a house in the Mir Ali District of North Wazaristan, killing five or six suspected militants.
- 3 November 2010: U.S. drones launch three separate attacks killing 13 militants. In the first attack, drones fired two missiles at a vehicle in the Qutab Khel area of Miran Shah killing 5 Uzbek militants. In the second attack, missiles struck a house and a vehicle in Khaso Khel village, near Mir Ali, killing 4 militants. In the third attack, four missiles were fired hitting a vehicle in Pai Khel village in Datta Khel town, killing 4 militants.
- 7 November 2010: Two U.S. drones strikes kill a total 13 or 14 militants in the Miran Shah area of North Waziristan. In the first attack, drones struck a house and a vehicle in the town of Ghulam Khan, north of Miran Shah killing 9 militants. The second attack occurred an hour later in which drones stuck several vehicles in the neighboring town of Datta Khel, killing 4 militants.
- 11 November 2010: A U.S. drone strike kills 6 suspected militants in North Waziristan. The militants were reportedly Haqqani Network fighters returning from operations in Khost Province, Afghanistan.
- 13 November 2010: A U.S. drone strike kills five people in the village of Ahmad Khel in the Mir Ali area in North Waziristan.
- 16 November 2010: Four drone-fired missiles hit a house and vehicle in Bangi Dar village of North Waziristan, killing 15 to 20 people, including 5–9 civilians.
- 19 November 2010: One U.S. drone strike kills 3 suspected militants in the region of North Waziristan.
- 21 November 2010: A U.S. drone strike near Miran Shah, North Waziristan, kills 6 suspected militants.
- 22 November 2010: A U.S. drone strike fired missiles at a car and a motorcycle in North Waziristan killing 5 alleged militants.
- 26 November 2010: A U.S. drone strike fired missiles at a vehicle in North Waziristan killing 4 alleged militants.
- 28 November 2010: U.S. drone missiles strike a vehicle in Hasan Khel village, around 30 kilometers east of Miranshah. Initial reports indicated the strike killed 3 or 4 militants. Local officials, however, later reported that the suspected militants had survived the strike by fleeing the targeted vehicle after the first missile missed.
- 6 December 2010: A U.S. drone strike in Khushali village, North Waziristan, kills 5 people. The strike may have also killed two noncombatants.
- 9 December 2010: At least four unknown people are killed by a U.S. drone strike on a vehicle in Mir Ali, North Waziristan according to anonymous Pakistani intelligence officials who suspect that they are militants.
- 14 December 2010: At least four suspected militants were killed by a U.S. drone strike on a vehicle in North Waziristan.
- 15 December 2010: U.S. drone strike targeting a vehicle kills 7 suspected militants in Spin Drand area of Khyber according to anonymous Pakistani intelligence officials.
- 17 December 2010: At least 60 suspected militants were killed in 3 U.S. drones strikes what is the highest death toll this year. According to security officials all the dead are suspected militants – a claim that cannot be independently confirmed. The first strike occurred at a compound in Speen Drang where pro-Taliban militants from the Lashkar-e-Islam group were holding a meeting killing over 32. The second strike occurred in Nakai, Khyber hitting a compound killing around 15. The last strike occurred at yet another compound in Sangana, Khyber killing 6. According to unnamed official sources 39 of the killed belonged to Lashkar-e-Islam while 15 were Tehreek-i-Taliban Pakistan. Extremist commander Ibn Amin was also killed in these strikes. He was a Taliban commander for the Swat valley.
- 27 December 2010: Two U.S. drone strikes near Mir Ali area of North Waziristan kill a total of 18 unknown people who were allegedly militants according to anonymous Pakistani intelligence officials.
- 28 December 2010: Two U.S. drone strikes in Pakistan's tribal region Tuesday kill 17 people. The drones fired two missiles on a suspected militant hideout in the area of Ghulam Khan. Later, a suspected drone circled around the blast site and fired two more missiles. Six people were killed. The second attack was on a vehicle in the same area, killing four more people.
- 31 December 2010: U.S. drone missile strike kills 8 people near the town of Ghulam Khan in the North Waziristan tribal agency according to Pakistani security officials who suspect that they are militants.

The Human Rights Commission of Pakistan claimed that at over 900 people were killed in U.S. drone attacks in Pakistan's tribal areas in 2010.

=== 2011 ===
==== January to April ====
- 1 January 2011: U.S. drones launched 3 separate strikes killing 18 people. In the first strike, drones struck a vehicle and a suspected militant compound in Mandi Khel, near Mir Ali, North Waziristan killing 9 people who are believed to be militants according to anonymous Pakistani intelligence officials. In the second strike, drones killed 5 alleged Taliban insurgents. In the last strike, a vehicle was struck in Boya village, in Datta Khel, North Waziristan killing 4 people.
- 12 January 2011: U.S. drones fired 4 missile at a compound in Haiderkhel village near the town of Mir Ali in North Waziristan killing 6 people.
- 18 January 2011: A U.S. drone strike kills at least five militants in North Waziristan according to anonymous Pakistani security officials.
- 23 January 2011: According to anonymous Pakistani security officials, Three drone strikes killed around 13 suspected militants in North Waziristan. In the first strike, two missiles hit a vehicle and a house in Doga Mada Khel village, killing four people. Hours later, another drone fired two more missiles, killing two people riding a motorcycle in the same village. In the third strike, a militant compound was struck at Mando Khel, 60 km south of Miram Shah near Razmak, North Waziristan killing 6 people. The same day around 2,000 tribesmen held a protest in Mir Ali, demanding an end to the drone strikes, saying they killed innocent civilians.
- 21 February 2011: Anonymous Pakistani intelligence officials announced that three drone-fired missiles demolished a house in the village of Kaza Panga, Azam Warsak district, South Waziristan killing seven suspected militants, including several Arabs and Turkmen. One of those killed was reported by Pakistani officials to be an Iraqi Al-qaeda finance coordinator named Abu Zaid al-Iraqi. Later that day, four missiles struck a house being used as a base by Taliban in the village of Spalga near Miran Shah in North Waziristan, killing eight suspected militants.
- 24 February 2011: Two separate strikes by drones kill 6 in North Waziristan.
- 8 March 2011: Drone strike in Landidog village in South Waziristan kills 5 militants according to Pakistani officials.
- 11 March 2011: 5 suspected militants killed in Ghorsaka area near Miranshah in North Waziristan.
- 13 March 2011: 2 missiles kill at least 6 people believed to be militants in Azam Warsak area of South Waziristan.
- 14 March 2011: 6 alleged militants killed near Miranshah in North Waziristan. Later in the day, another missile hit a vehicle near the Afghan border in Malik Jashdar in North Waziristan, killing three suspected militants.
- 16 March 2011: Unnamed Pakistani intelligence officials told AFP that a strike in Dattakhel in North Waziristan kills 5 militants. They also said that they do not know the identities of those killed in the strike.
- 17 March 2011: Forty-eight are killed and 50 wounded when several missiles fired from American drone aircraft hit a location in Datta Khel airstrike in North Waziristan. Those killed were mostly civilians involved in a jirga or dispute resolution council discussing a claim to a local chromite mine. Also killed were 12 Taliban helping adjudicate the meeting. Sherabat Khan Wazir, a top commander of Hafiz Gul Bahadur's Taliban faction, was killed in the strike, and in response Bahadur threatened to end the peace deal struck with the Pakistani government almost four years earlier. Ashfaq Parvez Kayani said that the attack was a "complete violation of human rights" and that there were children under the death. Pakistani officials said the strike will intensify protests throughout Pakistan over the release of CIA contractor Raymond Davis. The Punjab Assembly unanimously passed a resolution condemning the strike and demanded that the national government take a clearer stance on the issue. Parliamentarian Marvi Memon demanded to declare war on the United States. She suggested to order defence forces to launch a counterattack and said that it was the responsibility of the Pakistani government to protect its citizens.
- 13 April 2011: Two drones fired seven missiles in South Waziristan and killed six people. Reports conflicted on the intended target. One report indicated that the attacks targeted members of a pro-army group led by Maulvi Nazir although the deceased were said to be ordinary tribesmen unaffiliated with Nazir. The AFP reported that the six dead were all Afghans and members of the Haqqani network. Pakistan strongly condemned the attack and lodged a strong protest with U.S. Ambassador Cameron Munter. The Foreign Ministry in Islamabad stated: "We have repeatedly said that such attacks are counterproductive and only contribute to strengthen the hands of the terrorists." Prime Minister Yousaf Raza Gillani said that Pakistan was also seeking the intervention of friendly countries to get the U.S. to stop the drone attacks. An unnamed American government source stated that the CIA had no plans on stopping "operations" against terrorist suspects in Pakistan, saying, "Panetta has been clear with his Pakistani counterparts that his fundamental responsibility is to protect the American people, and he will not halt operations that support that objective".
- 21 April 2011: At least 25 people, including 4 women and 5 children, were killed and about 10 other wounded in drone attacks in the Mir Ali area of North Waziristan. The target was a compound of houses belonging to the Hafiz Gul Bahadur group, a pro-army group in the tribal area. The women and children were in nearby houses. Days before the strike U.S. Joint Chiefs of Staff Chairman Admiral Mike Mullen clearly stated that North Waziristan is the hot bed for terrorists and accused Pakistan of not doing enough to combat militants. The Pakistani army rejected this as "negative propaganda" and Chief of Army Staff general Ashfaq Parvez Kayani said: "In the war against terrorism, our officers and soldiers have made great sacrifices and have achieved tremendous success. The terrorists' backbone has been broken and Inshallah (God willing) we will soon prevail." The day after the attack Pakistan stopped the U.S. from using Shamsi Air Base in Pakistan's Balochistan Province to fly drones. A senior military official told NBC News, "Yes, I can confirm that Shamsi Air Base is no more under the use of Americans and the 150 Americans previously stationed there are now gone." The base had been used for some time by the U.S. to launch unmanned Predator drones against terrorist targets.

==== May to August ====
- 6 May 2011: 12–15 people killed and several injured at Dua Toi in the Datta Khel area 30 miles west of Miram Shah, North Waziristan in the first such attack since the killing of Osama Bin Laden. An unnamed Pakistani official said the missiles hit a car and a compound belonging to Hafiz Gul Bahadar, and that four of those killed were "foreigners". British and Pakistani journalists report that, in addition to 12 militants, the strike killed six civilians.
- 10 May 2011: 4 suspected militants killed in an attack near Angoor Adda village in South Waziristan. Two missiles hit a vehicle in village, wounding four others in addition to those killed. An unnamed Pakistani official said three of those killed were "Arabs". The area hit is under the control of Mullah Nazir.
- 12 May 2011: 5–8 suspected militants killed when a U.S. drone fired two missiles into a vehicle in Pakistan's tribal district of North Waziristan. Pakistani officials stated that some of those killed were "foreigners".
- 13 May 2011: 5 killed when at least 4 missiles strike a vehicle in Doga Madakhel village of North Waziristan.
- 16 May 2011: 2 strikes in Mir Ali in North Waziristan kill 10 suspected militants.
- 20 May 2011: 2 missiles fired by drones kill 6 people in North Waziristan.
- 23 May 2011: Drone strike on a vehicle on the outskirts of Mir Ali in North Waziristan kills 7 suspected militants.
- 3 June 2011: Drone strike in Ghwakhwa area of South Waziristan kills 9 militants. Top ranking Al-qaeda militant Ilyas Kashmiri is reported killed.
- 6 June 2011: Three drone strikes kill 16–21 people. Unnamed Pakistani intelligence officials claimed that they were suspected militants. Other witnesses said that some were "Arabs" and seven were civilians. CNN could not independently confirm the identities of the people killed.
- 8 June 2011: Five missiles strike a militant compound in Zoi (or Zoynarai) village in Shawal region of North Waziristan, near the border with South Waziristan, killing 15–23 suspected militants. Senior unnamed Pakistani officials as well as local officials confirmed the strike. In response to a series of strikes against their group a spokesman for Taliban leader Maulvi Nazir announced that his group would send more people into Afghanistan to fight U.S. forces as they had no capability to shoot down drones over South Waziristan.
- 15 June 2011: Two strikes by drones in South Waziristan and one in North Waziristan kill 15 suspected militants according to Pakistani intelligence officials. The strike near Wana in South Waziristan reportedly killed 10 fighters from Mullah Nazir's army. In the other strike, near Miranshah in North Waziristan, 5–6 civilians were killed in a car. Later residents blocked roads with the coffins of the dead to protest the killing of civilians.
- 20 June 2011: Three strikes kill 15–17 the Kurram tribal area. Those killed were mostly alleged militants but 2–7 civilians were also among the dead.
- 27 June 2011: Missile strikes from two U.S. drones killed at least 21 suspected militants in Pakistan's South Waziristan on Monday, Pakistani officials said. The first strike against a moving vehicle in Ghalmandi Panga village reportedly killed eight suspected militants. The second strike a few hours later reportedly hit a militant training center in Mantoi, killing 13 suspected militants according to an intelligence official who declined to be identified.
- 5 July 2011: Four killed and 5 injured in a strike on a militant hideout near Mir Ali in North Waziristan. According to two local TV station in Pakistan based on unnamed official sources, Saif Ullah, an Australian and al Qaeda supporter, was killed in the strike. However, there is no official confirmation for his death.
- 11 July 2011: Drone strikes near Gorvak village in North Waziristan kill 12 suspected militants according to Pakistani Intelligence officials. Over the next 24 hours several more attacks lead to the death of 45–61 suspected militants. The strikes sparked panic among people in the area and the death toll is the second highest since the beginning of the airstrikes.
- 12 July 2011: 23 suspected militants were killed in South Waziristan, followed by a drone strike on a vehicle in North Waziristan, resulting in the deaths of 7 suspected militants, bringing the total death toll to 30.
- 21 July 2011: 4 people were reportedly killed in a strike in Khushali Toori Khel area of North Waziristan.
- 1 August 2011: 4–6 alleged militants are killed and at least seven other people are injured when two vehicles are hit by two drone-launched missiles near Azam Warsak, 15 kilometers west of Wana, South Waziristan. According to the Long War Journal, that area is controlled by Taliban leader Maulvi Nazir.
- 10 August 2011: Two drone-launched missiles hit a house 3 km east of Miran Shah, North Waziristan, killing 21 militants, 14 of whom were members of the Haqqani Network. The rest of those killed were Arabs and Uzbeks, according to unnamed Pakistani intelligence officials who were not authorized to speak to the media.
- 15 August 2011: According to unnamed Pakistani officials 4 suspected militants were killed near Miranshah after 2 missiles fired by Drones. The identity of those killed is unclear.
- 19 August 2011: Four suspected militants killed in suspected drone attack in Sheen Warsik in South Waziristan according to Pakistani officials.
- 22 August 2011: According to unnamed Pakistani officials a suspected U.S. drone strike in North Waziristan killed 4 suspected militants including Al-Qaeda's second in command Atiyah Abd al-Rahman.

==== September to December ====
- 4 September 2011: 7 suspected militants killed in a drone strike in North Wazirstan.
- 11 September 2011: Abu Hafs al Shari, Al-Qaeda's operational chief and the replacement for Atiyah Abdel Rahman, was killed along with 3 other militants by a U.S. drone strike on a vehicle and compound in Hisokhel in the Mir Ali area of North Waziristan.
- 12 September 2011: Two militants killed in a drone strike on their vehicle in the Esokhel area of North Waziristan. One of the dead was reported to be Hafeezulla, a commander in the Haqqani network. In another strike the same day three people were killed in an attack on a house near Mir Ali.
- 23 September 2011: 6 Haqqani network insurgents, including 4 Central Asians, were killed in a drone strike on a house in North Waziristan.
- 27 September 2011: 3 people are killed in a strike on a house in Azam Warzak, South Waziristan. Unnamed security officials who were not authorized to talk with reporters said they were militants while other sources said the militants escaped. The village is in the territory of Taliban leader Mullah Nazir and reportedly, according to the Long War Journal, serves as a transit point for insurgent fighters into and out of Afghanistan.
- 30 September 2011: 3 suspected militants killed in a strike Baghar Cheena area of South Waziristan.
- 13 October 2011: Two separate drone strikes killed a total of seven suspected militants in Waziristan. The first strike in Dande Darpa Khel village in North Waziristan killed four including Jan Baz Zadran, a logistics commander for the Haqqani network. The second strike killed three suspected militants in the town of Angoor Adda in South Waziristan who were launching rockets into Afghanistan. The widow of Abu Miqdad al Masri, a member of al-Qaida's Shura Majlis, or executive council, later stated that he, along with their two sons Al Miqdad Rafie Mustafa and Khalid Rafie Mustafa, were killed in a drone strike on or around this date.
- 26 October 2011: A U.S. drone strike in South Waziristan killed 13–22 militants, including Taj Gul Mehsud, a close aid to the TTP.
- 27 October 2011: A U.S. drone strike targeted Maulvi Nazir's faction of the Taliban in the Warsak area of South Waziristan. Four, including Nazir's younger brother, were killed.
- 27 October 2011: In a separate attack, a drone fired missiles into an alleged militant hideout near the North Waziristan town of Mir Ali, killing six men.
- 30 October 2011: Suspected U.S. drones fired six missiles at a vehicle in the Datta Khel area of North Waziristan, killing six alleged militants.
- 31 October 2011: Three people including two boys, Tariq Aziz and his 12-year-old cousin Waheed Khan were killed in a U.S. drone strike in the Miranshah area North Waziristan. Prior to his killing, 16-year-old Tariq Aziz had helped the Bureau of Investigative Journalism document civilian casualties caused by drone strikes. Human rights lawyer Clive Stafford Smith said: "I met this lad Tariq last week, and he was no more a terrorist than my mother."
- 3 November 2011: Three men, suspected as being Haqqani network militants, killed in North Waziristan.
- 15 November 2011: 6 or 7 suspected militants were killed when a drone fired two missiles on a suspected militant compound in Miranshah Bazaar, part of the town of Miranshah, North Waziristan.
- 16 November 2011: 16 people, at least two of whom were TTP militants, were killed after about six missiles from drones targeted a compound in the Babar Ghar area of Sararogha Tehsil, South Waziristan.
- 17 November 2011: 6 suspected militants killed in a strike near Razmak in North Waziristan.

=== 2012 ===
==== January to April ====
- 10 January 2012: U.S. drone strike near Miran Shah killed four militants including three Arabs according to Pakistani intelligence officials. A U.S. official who spoke on the condition of anonymity told Reuters they believe the attack have killed Aslam Awan, also known as Abdullah Khorasani, who has been described as a senior operations organiser for al Qaeda. Pakistani officials could not confirm that Awan was killed.
- 11 January 2012: According to unnamed Pakistani intelligence officials a U.S. drone fired two missiles at two vehicles driving towards the Afghan border in the Dogga area of North Waziristan killing between 6 and 8 people. Other Pakistani intelligence officials who spoke on condition of anonymity said that intercepted militant radio communications indicated that the leader of the Pakistani Taliban, Hakimullah Mehsud may have been killed in this drone strike. The Taliban denied that. Later reports indicated that Aslam Awan, a deputy to the leader of al Qaeda's external operations network, was killed in the strike.
- 23 January 2012: According to senior security official speaking to Agence France-Presse on condition of anonymity: A drone strike kills four militants, reportedly from Turkmenistan, in a vehicle in Degan near Miramshah, North Waziristan.
- 8 February 2012: According to unnamed Pakistani security officials, two U.S. Drone strikes within 24 hours killed around 14 militants and their family members. In the first strike, drones fired a pair of missiles at a compound in the town of Tappi near Miranshah killing 10 Haqqani Network and Central Asian fighters. In the second strike, the drone fired a pair of missiles at a compound in Miranshah, killing Badr Mansoor, who was the al-Qaeda chief for Pakistan along with his wife and 2 children. Al Qaeda later confirmed Mansoor's death.
- 16 February 2012: Two separate U.S. drone strikes killed at least 21 suspected militants. In the first attack, U.S. drones fired missiles at a compound in the town of Spalga near Miranshah, killing at least 5 suspected militants and wounded several others. In the second attack, U.S. drone struck a convoy of vehicles near Mir Ali, about 25 kilometers east of Miranshah, killing at least 15 "Uzbek militants", according to unknown officials. There is no way of getting independent confirmation of the figures as reporters are prevented by the authorities from travelling to the region.
- 25 February 2012: According to Pakistani officials, a U.S. drone crashed in the Machikhel area about 20 miles east of Miranshah, North Waziristan. According to the officials, Taliban militants recovered equipment from the crashed drone.
- 9 March 2012: According to Pakistani officials, drone missiles killed 12–13 suspected militants in Makeen in the Mandao district of South Waziristan. According to The Long War Journal, the Makeen area is under the control of Hakeemullah Mehsud, the leader of the Movement of the Taliban in Pakistan. Later reports indicated that Samir H., a German jihadist, was killed in this strike.
- 13 March 2012: Two separate drone attacks occurred in the Waziristan region. The first, in the Drey Nishtar area of South Waziristan along the Afghan border, targeted fighters under Maulvi Nazir who were traveling in a vehicle and killed 8 suspected militants, including local commanders Amir Hamza, Shamsullah and Qari Haleemullah. The second attack happened in the Sara Khawra/Shawal area straddling the border between North and South Waziristan. 7 suspected militants in a vehicle died in that attack.
- 29 March 2012: According to unnamed Pakistani officials, U.S. drones fired a missile at a house in Miranshah, North Waziristan killing 4 militants and wounding 2 others. The strike occurred in the money changers market in the Miranshah commercial district.
- 29 April 2012: U.S. drones fired missiles at an abandoned girls school in Miranshah, North Waziristan killing 4 suspected militants and wounding 3 others. A local resident, Haji Niamat Khan, said more than two dozen militants were living in the school when it was attacked. It may be that Abu Usman Adil, emir of the Islamic Movement of Uzbekistan, was killed in this strike as the group announced in August that he had died in an April drone strike.

==== May to August ====
- 4 May 2012: Four to eight drone-launched missiles hit a compound in the village of Darr-e-Nishtar in the Shawal Valley in North Waziristan, killing eight to ten suspected militants and wounding one.
- 23 May 2012: A U.S. drone strike has killed at least four suspected militants in the North Waziristan tribal area, unnamed Pakistani security officials say, in an area known to be a stronghold of al-Qaeda and the Taliban.
- 24 May 2012: A U.S. drone strike has killed at least eight people in a volatile tribal area of north-west Pakistan, officials say.
- 26 May 2012: According to unnamed officials, four to eight drone-launched missiles hit a compound in the village of Darr-e-Nishtar in the Shawal Valley in North Waziristan, killing at least four people. Pakistani officials said those killed were suspected militants, but this has not been independently verified.
- 28 May 2012: A U.S. drone strike has killed at least six people in north-west Pakistan, officials say, the latest in a barrage of strikes on a restive tribal region.
- 29 May 2012: Twelve people were killed and five others injured in two separate U.S. drone attacks in Mir Ali and Dattakhel areas of the North Waziristan tribal region.
- 2 June 2012: Pakistani security official speaking on condition of anonymity said, a U.S. drone strike targeting a vehicle in Pakistan's northwestern tribal belt killed at least four suspected militants.
- 3 June 2012: Ten suspected militants are killed when a U.S. drone fires four missiles at a gathering in the village of Mana Raghza mourning the death of an insurgent killed in a drone strike the previous day.
- 4 June 2012: Sixteen people were killed and two injured when U.S. drones attacked a house and a vehicle suspected of carrying militants in Mir Ali in North Waziristan. Unnamed U.S. and Pakistani officials stated that Al-Qaeda second in command Abu Yahya al-Libi was killed in the strike. Unnamed American officials said Abu Yahya al-Libi was the sole casualty of the strike however Pakistani officials said 16 people were killed in the strike.
- 13–14 June 2012:Two drone strikes within 24-hours in North Waziristan. The first killed four suspected militants in a vehicle in the village of Isha near Miramshah. The second strike killed three suspected militants in a building in Miramshah.
- 26 June 2012: A drone strike killed 5 and wounded 3 in a compound in the Shawal Valley of North Waziristan.
- 1 July 2012: According to unnamed Pakistani officials who spoke on condition of anonymity, drone-launched missiles strike a compound in the Shawal Valley of North Waziristan, killed eight militants from the Turkistan Islamic Party and loyalists of Hafiz Gul Bahadar.
- 6 July 2012: U.S. drones fired six missiles at a compound near Miranshah killing up to 19 suspected militants. Pakistani officials stated that most of the killed were foreigners.
- 23 July 2012: Eight drone-fired missiles strike a compound in the village of Dre Nishtar in the Shawal Valley of North Waziristan, killing 12 suspected militants. According to the Long War Journal reportedly loyal to Hafiz Gul Bahadar including a local Taliban commander.
- 29 July 2012: According to an unnamed security official, six drone-fired missiles hit a compound and vehicle in Khushhali Turikhel near Mir Ali, North Waziristan, killing six to seven Uzbek militants.
- 18 August 2012: Unnamed Pakistani officials told the AFP that two drone fired missiles hit a compound and vehicle in Shuwedar in the Shawal Valley in North Waziristan, killing six suspected militants. The attack came as people were celebrating the festival of Eid-ul-Fitr.
- 19 August 2012: According to Pakistani intelligence officials speaking on condition of anonymity, five drones fire missiles at two vehicles in the Mana area of the Shawal Valley in North Waziristan, killing four to seven suspected militants. A short time later, additional missiles targeted recovery efforts at the destroyed vehicles, killing two more suspected militants.
- 21 August 2012: A drone strike near Miramshah, North Waziristan may have killed top Haqqani Network leader Badruddin Haqqani, according to Afghan intelligence reports. The Haqqani network denied that Badruddin was killed.
- 24 August 2012: U.S. drones fired at least six missiles into a mud-walled compounds and at least two vehicles killing 18 people. An intelligence officials said on condition of anonymity that the leader of the East Turkestan Islamic Movement, Emeti Yakuf, also known by his local name as Abdul Jabbar, two Tehrik-i-Taliban Pakistan (TTP) commanders and three other militant commanders were among the dead.

==== September to December ====
- 1 September 2012: Four drone-fired missiles hit a compound and vehicle in Degan, North Waziristan, reportedly killing six suspected militants.
- 22 September 2012: Drone-fired missiles hit a vehicle traveling in the Datta Khel area of in North Waziristan, killing three suspected militants.
- 24 September 2012: Drone-fired missiles kill five or six suspected "foreign" militants in the Mir Ali area of North Waziristan. Two of those killed were reportedly Abu Kasha al Iraqi and Fateh al Turki. Abu Kasha reportedly acted as a liaison between al Qaeda's Shura Majlis (executive council) and the Movement of the Taliban in Pakistan and the Uzbek Islamic Jihad Group. al Turki was a previously unidentified, mid-level, al Qaeda leader. Taliban sources confirmed their deaths.
- 1 October 2012: Four drone-fired missiles hit a vehicle in the village of Khaderkhai in the Mir Ali area of North Waziristan, killing three suspected militants, including senior al-Qaeda member Hassan Ghul.
- 10 October 2012: A suspected U.S. drone attack killed three to five suspected militants in a compound in the Mir Ali area of North Waziristan.
- 12 October 2012: A U.S. drone attack on Thursday killed 16–18 alleged insurgents – reportedly consisting of mostly Afghan Taliban – at a compound in the Buland Khel area of Arakzai in the Federally Administered Tribal Areas (FATA) near the border with Afghanistan, officials said. This is only the second known drone strike in Arakzai to date.
- 24 October 2012: Three drone-fired missiles hit a compound and vehicle in the village of Tappi near Miramshah, North Waziristan, reportedly killing four militants, a civilian, and three cows. This airstrike was most likely the one that killed Mammana Bibi, due to the dates matching. Mammana's death gained attention in October of 2013 as her son, Rafiq ur Rehman, travelled to Washington D.C. with his children, Zubair, and Nabila Rehman (who testified in front of Congress).
- 29 November 2012: A drone attack targeted a vehicle in the Shin Warsak village of Birmil Tehsil. The Express Tribune reported two suspected militants died as a result, but the AFP reported no casualties.

=== 2013 ===
- 2 January 2013: A drone strike killed 10 militants, including Mullah Nazir, in South Waziristan near the Afghan border.
- 8 February 2013: Two al Qaeda fighters were killed.
- 29 May 2013: Two security officials said that Waliur Rehman Mehsud was among five people killed when a drone struck a house outside Miranshah, North Waziristan.
- 7 June 2013: At least seven people were killed when an American drone fired three missiles at a house in northwestern Pakistan, according to an intelligence official, hours after the country's new prime minister announced his cabinet.
- 3 July 2013: A U.S. drone strike killed at least 16 people in Pakistan's restive border region early on Wednesday, Pakistani security officials said, in the biggest such attack this year, and the second since Prime Minister Nawaz Sharif took office. Most of those killed were fighters for the Haqqani network, according to three Taliban commanders and security officials. Two missiles hit a house near the main market in Miranshah, the provincial capital of the tribal region of North Waziristan. The region is considered a Taliban stronghold.
- 13 July 2013: At least two people were killed Saturday in an American drone strike in a northwestern tribal region of Pakistan, according to intelligence officials.
- 28 July 2013: At least six militants were killed and four others injured after the latest American drone strike in Pakistan's restive tribal belt on Sunday, Pakistani intelligence officials and militant commanders said.
- 31 August 2013: A U.S. drone targeted a vehicle in North Waziristan tribal agency, killing four suspected militants said to be of Turkmen origin.
- 5 September 2013: A drone strike on a house in the Ghulam Khan district of North Waziristan killed Mullah Sangeen Zadran, deputy to Sirajuddin Haqqani of the Haqqani Network, and Zubir al Muzi, an al Qaeda explosives expert from Egypt, as well as three others.
- 30 September 2013: A U.S. drone targeted a compound killed three, the attack took place in the Boya area of North Waziristan region.
- 30 October 2013: Three suspected militants were killed and three more people injured in a drone strike on a compound on Zafar Town area near Miramshah, North Waziristan.
- 1 November 2013: A U.S. drone targeted a vehicle in the Dande Darpakhel area of North Waziristan. The attack killed five militants including Hakimullah Mehsud, chief of the Tehrik-i-Taliban Pakistan (TTP), as well as the leader's two key aides and fellow militant commanders, Abdullah Bahar Mehsud and Tariq Mehsud. Two others were injured in the strike.
- 21 November 2013: A U.S. drone targeted a religious seminary in Hangu District, Tal area of Khyber Pakhtunkhwa. Six were killed, including Maulvi Hameedullah and Maulvi Ahmad Jan, two senior aides to Sirajuddin Haqqani, who was reportedly spotted at the seminary two days prior. It is believed the pair were attending a condolence meeting for Naseeruddin Haqqani who was killed on 11 November.
- 29 November 2013: Three suspected militants were killed and several other injured in a U.S. drone strike on a compound in Angar Kalli area near Miran Shah Tehsil in North Waziristan Agency.
- 26 December 2013: A U.S. drone strike fired two missiles on a compound in Qutab Khel village, Miramshah, North-Waziristan, killing four and injuring one.

=== 2014 ===
- 14 May 2014: A U.S. drone fired three missiles on a compound near Pak-Afghan Border, killing 10 and injuring 14 others.
- 12 June 2014: Two separate and successive U.S. drone strikes in Dargah Mandi village and Dande Darpakhel area in North Waziristan killed at least 16 while injuring several others.
- 18 June 2014: A U.S. drone strike killed at least 6 in the Miramshah tehsil of North Waziristan.
- 10 July 2014: A U.S. drone strike killed at least 6 in the Madakhel village of Dattakhel tehsil in North Waziristan.
- 16 July 2014: At least 18 people were killed in a U.S. drone strike in Dattakhel area of North Waziristan.
- 19 July 2014: At least 8 people were killed in a U.S. drone strike in Doga Madakhel village of Dattakhel tehsil in North Waziristan.
- 6 Aug 2014: At least 7 people were killed in a U.S. drone strike in Dattakhel area of North Waziristan.
- 24 Sept 2014: At least 8 people including Uzbek Militants were reportedly killed in a U.S. drone strike Dattakhel tehsil of North Waziristan.
- 5 Oct 2014: At least 5 suspected militants were killed in a U.S. drone strike in Shawal area of South Waziristan tribal region.
- 6 Oct 2014: At least 8 suspected militant were killed and several other injured in a U.S. drone strike in Shawal district of North Waziristan.
- 7 Oct 2014: At least 3 suspected militants were killed in a U.S. drone strike in North Waziristan region.
- 11 Oct 2014': A U.S. drone strikes killed Sheikh Imran Ali Siddiqi a senior leader in al-Qaeda in the Indian Subcontinent along with 4 other militants and wounding 2 more in Tirah Valley. A second U.S. drone strike killed a Taliban commander named Muhammad Mustafa and 3 other militants in Maraga, Shawal Valley, North Waziristan.
- 30 Oct 2014: A U.S. drone strike killed at least 4, injuring several others in Birmal Tehsil of South Waziristan.
- 11 Nov 2014: A U.S. drone strike in Doa Toi area of Datakhel tehsil in North Waziristan Agency killed 4 suspected militants.
- 21 Nov 2014:Reportedly Five suspected militants including two commander of 'Qaedat al-Jihad in the sub-continent’, a newly established branch of Al Qaeda were killed in a U.S. Drone strike in Datakhel region of North Waziristan Agency.
- 6 December 2014: A U.S. drone strike killed a key Al Qaeda leader Umar Farooq along with four others in Datakhel region of North Waziristan Agency.
- 26 December 2014: Two separate U.S. Drone strikes in the Kund and Mangroti area of Shawal in North Waziristan Agency killed at least 7 suspected militants.

=== 2015 ===
- 4 January 2015: A reportedly high value unidentified Uzbek commander of Taliban's Gul Bahadur group was killed along with 8 others by a U.S. drone strike in Shawal area of North Waziristan Agency.
- 15 January 2015: A U.S. drone strike reportedly killed 7 suspected militants in Wacha Dara area of Liddah Tehsil of South Waziristan Agency.
- 19 January 2015: A U.S. drone strike killed 6 while injuring 4 others in the ShahiKhel area of North Waziristan's Shawwal tehsil.
- 28 January 2015: A U.S. drone strike killed 7 while injuring another militant in the Shawal area of North Waziristan.
- 18 March 2015: A U.S. drone strike killed a TTP commander Khawrey Mehsud along with 3 others in Shabak area of Kurram Agency.
- 12 April 2015: A U.S. drone strike killed 4 suspected militants in North Waziristan.
- 16 May 2015: A CIA drone strike Killed 7 to 13 people in the Mana area of North Waziristan Agency.
- 18 May 2015: A U.S. drone strike killed 6 suspected militants in Zoye Narye Area of North Waziristan.
- 2 June 2015: Four suspected militants were killed in a drone strike targeting a vehicle in the Shawal area of North Waziristan.
- 6 June 2015: At least nine suspected militants were killed in a strike in Shawal's Zoya Saidgai area, considered to be a hideout of the Afghan Taliban.
- 6 August 2015: Seven suspected militants were killed in a U.S. drone strike at a house in the Lowara Mandi area of Datta Khel in North Waziristan. The strike was condemned by the Pakistani government.
- 1 September 2015: At least five suspected militants were killed by a U.S. drone strike in either the Lawara Banga or Karwanda area of North Waziristan. Three of the people killed in the strike were Uzbek nationals. The strike was condemned by the Pakistani government.

=== 2016 ===
- 9 January 2016: A U.S. drone strike killed at least five people in the Mangrooti village of Shawal Valley, North Waziristan, including Pakistan Taliban leader Maulana Noor Saeed and two Uzbeks.
- 22 February 2016: A U.S. drone strike in Shaheedano Dhand, Lower Kurram killed five people and injured four others.
- 21 May 2016: A U.S. drone strike killed Mullah Akhtar Mansoor, the leader of the Afghan Taliban, and a taxi driver near Ahmad Wal, Balochistan.

=== 2017 ===
- 2 March 2017: A U.S. drone strike killed two people were killed in the Sara Khwa area of Lower Kurram. This was the first drone strike in Pakistan under the administration of United States President Donald Trump.
- 26 April 2017: A U.S. drone strike killed several Pakistani Taliban militants in Zuwai village near Datta Khel, North Waziristan.
- 24 May 2017: A U.S. drone strike killed three militants in the Garvik area of North Waziristan.
- 13 June 2017: Up to three people, including a Haqqani network leader named "Abubakar" and his partner, were killed after a suspected U.S. drone fired two missiles at his house in the Speel Tal area of Hangu district in Khyber Pakhtunkhwa. Local officials contend that the strike was of U.S. origin, but then Pentagon spokesman Adam Stump denied the accusations.
- 15 September 2017: A U.S. drone strike killed at least three militants belonging to the Afghan Taliban and wounded two others in the Ghozgarhy village of Upper Kurram.
- 30 November 2017: Four people were killed after a U.S. drone strike was carried out on a compound under the command of Abdul Rasheed Haqqani, a senior network commander of the Haqqani network, in the Ghozgarhy village of Upper Kurram.

=== 2018 ===
- 17 January 2018: At least one man was severely injured in a drone strike allegedly carried out by a U.S. spy plane in Badshah Kot, Kurram Agency.
- 24 January 2018: A drone strike carried out by the Resolute Support Mission in Kurram Agency targeted an Afghan refugee camp. This strike was condemned by the Pakistani government.
- 8 February 2018: A U.S. drone strike on a compound in the border village of Gorwak in North Waziristan, killing seven militants, the apparent target of the strike was Qudrat Ullah, the Haqqani network's local commander, though it is unclear if he was among those killed.
- 4 July 2018: Two unnamed Pakistani intelligence officials told AP that a U.S. drone strike killed Qari Abdullah Dawar—a commander in the Hafiz Gul Bahadur group of the Pakistani Taliban—and his associate while they were walking near their mountain hideout in the Tor Tangai area of North Waziristan.

=== 2024 ===
- 14 May 2024: Police officials told AP that four people were killed in a drone strikes in North Waziristan. It is unclear whether the strike was carried out by Pakistani or American forces.

== Strikes which may have occurred in Afghanistan or Pakistan ==
For some drone strikes which landed close to the Afghanistan-Pakistan border, it is not certain on which side of the border they occurred.

=== 2017 ===
- 26 December 2017: A suspected U.S. drone strike occurred along the Afghanistan-Pakistan border, killing a commander from the Haqqani Network according to a Pakistani official and two Haqqani group members. The Pakistani official said it was not clear which side of the border the strike occurred on, while the Haqqani Network members and a witness claimed the strike occurred in Pakistan.

== See also ==
- 2024 Iranian missile strikes in Pakistan, involving drone strikes
- 2025 India–Pakistan conflict, which saw drone warfare
- List of drone strikes in Yemen
- Drone strikes in Somalia
- List of drone strikes in Afghanistan
