= Battle of Wana =

Military engagement between Pakistan and Al-Qaeda

Coordinates: 32.3061°N 69.5928°E

- Part of the Insurgency in Khyber Pakhtunkhwa
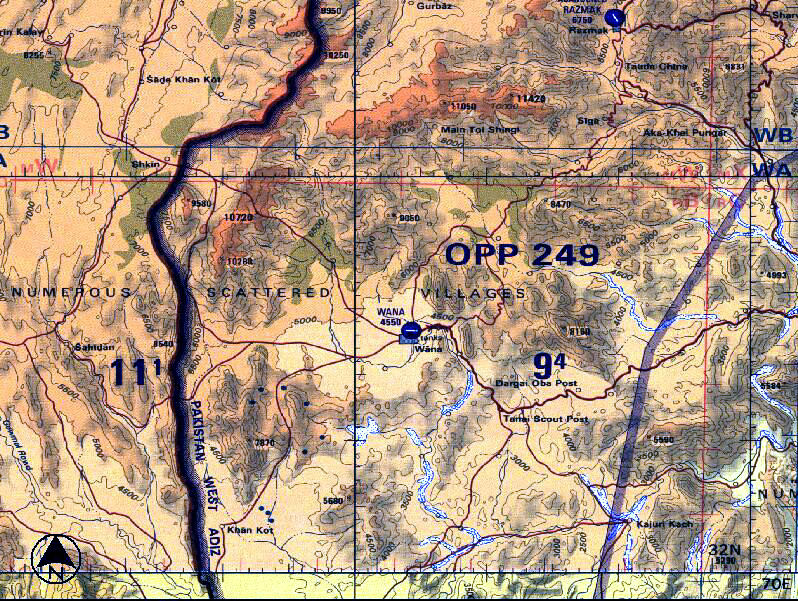
- Military Intelligence map: The area involved in the fighting.
| Date | March 16 – March 23, 2004 (7 days) |
| Location | Wana, South Waziristan, Federally Administered Tribal Areas, Pakistan |
| Result | Pakistani victory |

Belligerents
| Pakistan | al-Qaeda; Pro-Taliban Pakistani mujahideen Islamic Movement of Uzbekistan |

Commanders and leaders
| Ali Jan Orakzai | Ayman al-Zawahiri; Osama bin Laden; Tohir Yoʻldosh (WIA); Naik Muhammad †; Noor Wali Mehsud |

Units involved
| Pakistan Armed Forces; Pakistan Army; 9th Infantry Division; 4th Cobra Squadron; 20th Mountain Brigade; Pakistan Air Force | al-Qaeda and TTP Mujahedeen forces |

Strength
| ~7,000; 4–8 F-7 & F-16 jets; ~50 ISI CAD members | 400 al-Qaeda fighters |

Casualties and losses
| 17 soldiers killed; 11 soldiers captured; 33 soldiers wounded | 55 al-Qaeda fighters killed; 150 fighters captured |

The Battle of Wana was a March 2004 military engagement between the Pakistan Army and members of Osama Bin Laden's al-Qaeda at Azam Warsak, near the South Waziristan town of Wana. The army troops and intelligence paramilitary soldiers faced an estimated ~500 al-Qaeda foreign fighters holed up in several fortified settlements. The fighting ended with 17 soldiers dead.

It was speculated at the time that Osama bin Laden's deputy Ayman al-Zawahiri was among those trapped by the Pakistan Army, but he either escaped or was never among these fighters. After weeks of fighting, the ISPR admitted that it was actually Tohir Yoldeshev, leader of the Islamic Movement of Uzbekistan, who was hiding there.

== Background ==
Wana (Pashto: واڼۀ) is a small town inhabitant by the Mehsud and Wazir Tribes. The town is situated in complex series of White mountains range in western Pakistan. The town closely aligned with Tora Bora area of adjacent country, Afghanistan.

In early months of 2002, Pakistan Army sent and deployed large formation of Infantry and Mountaineering Divisions. The Mountaineering and Infantry Divisions were deployed under the command of Lieutenant-General Ali Jan Aurakzai, who later became Governor of North-West Frontier Province of Pakistan. The Army Divisions entered the Tirah Valley in the Khyber Agency for the first time since Pakistan independence in 1947. The troops were later proceeded to move into the Shawal Valley of North Waziristan, and later South Waziristan.

In late December 2003, the tension between Pakistan Government and the Waziri tribes mounted as the tribe leaders viewed the action as an attempt to subjugate them.

== Military Intelligence ==
According to the reports of the military intelligence, there were ~500–600 al-Qaeda fighters in the region; all militants were Chechens, Uighurs, Uzbeks, Arabs and Tajik fighters. By March 19, 2004, a team of ISI's Covert Action Division (CAD) secretly inserted in the Shin Warsak area, where they confirmed the High-value target presence. The media reports claimed that it was Ayman al-Zawahiri hiding in the area and might be holed up in one of the areas. In describing the military intelligence reports, President Musharraf testified that:

We feel that there may be a high-value target. I can't say who. The ferociousness of the surrounded fighters indicated that they were protecting someone particularly significant.

After a week of fighting, the ISPR testified that military intelligence sources have confirmed that one of the top al Qaeda leader, Tohir Yo‘ldosh, has been injured in the military operation in the tribal area and has fled the area. According to one version of the military intelligence reports reads:

Reports indicate that it was actually Tahir and not Zawahiri, who was driving in the bullet-proof double-cabin pick- up truck that subsequently hit a wall and was later found abandoned.

== The Battle for Mountains ==
On 13–19 March 2004, a small team of the ISI's Covert Action Division and SS Directorate were inserted by a helicopter in the Shin Warsk area to confirm the militant activities. The CAD and SSD teams confirmed the fighters were Chechens, Uzbeks, and Tajiks; this marked the start of the military operation. On 16 March 2004, the army troops made the first contact with the al-Qaeda foreign fighters around the South Waziristan village of Wana.

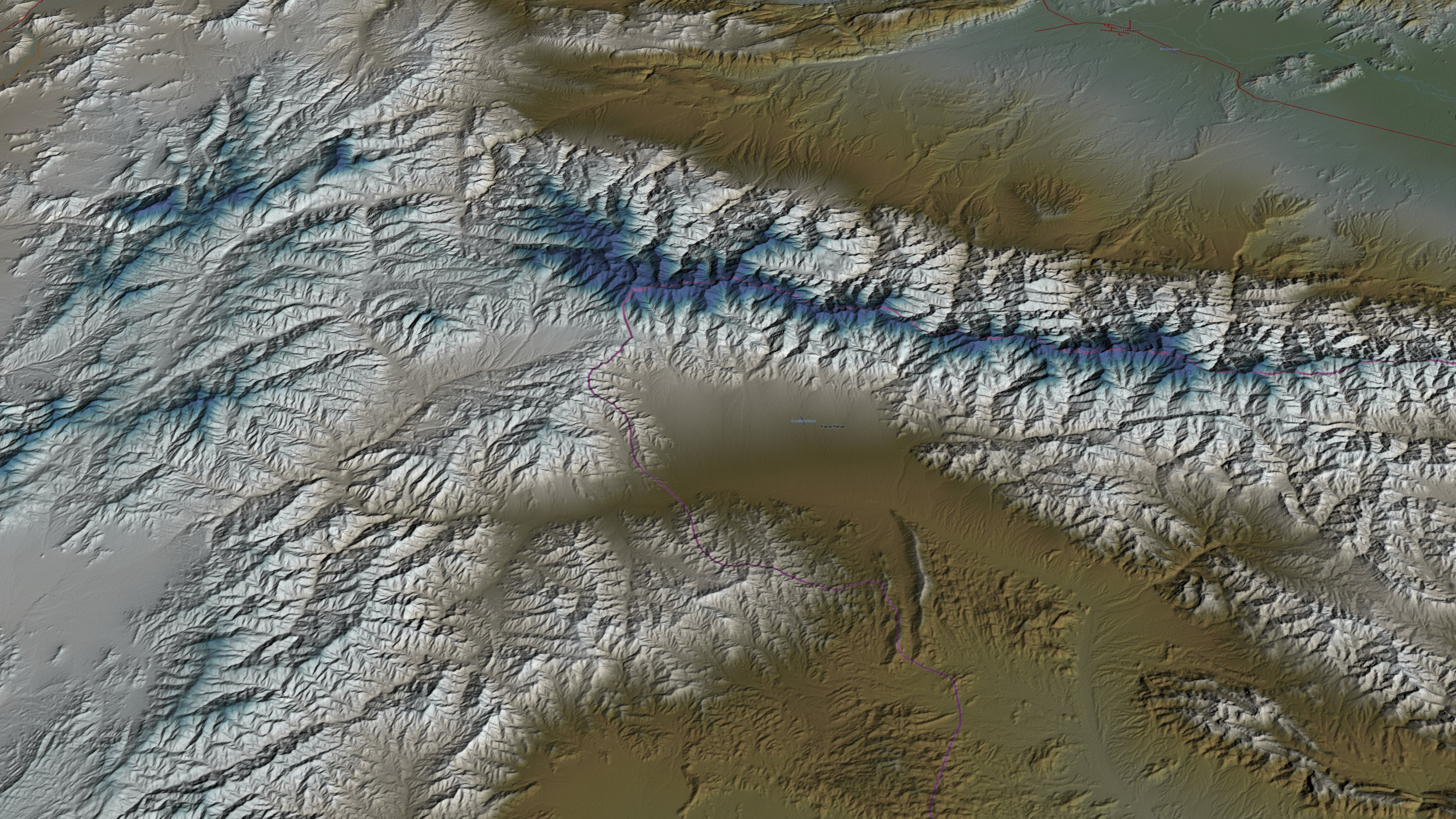
Air Intelligence map: The Pakistan Armed Forces troops and the foreign fighters fought the phases of the battle in White Mountains (Safed Koh range) of Pakistan, closely aligned to Tora Bora of Afghanistan.

Heavy fighting between army infantry troops and al-Qaeda fighters began in the small village of Wana, though al-Qaeda had evacuated the village but army had suffered heavy casualties. Soon after the confrontation, the Pakistan Army realised the seriousness of the foreign fighters capabilities, and deployed the 20th Mountain Brigade to support operations in the mountainous areas. Two days later, on March 18, 2004, reports began to surface that the Pakistani military had surrounded a High-value target, possibly Al-Qaeda's second-in-command Dr. Ayman al-Zawahiri. However, both the Pakistani and U.S. military refused to confirm or deny Zawahiri's presence. The army surrounded the mountain redoubt where al-Qaeda foreign fighters were well dug-in. The CAD and SSD teams were tasked with finding the high-value target during the armed conflict and that high-value target was reportedly wounded in the battle. Heavy fighting ensued, and repeated assaults were beaten back by al-Qaeda fighters. The Pakistan Army forces suffered heavy casualties.

As troops pushed into the mountains, the al-Qaeda fighters launched aggressive attacks on Pakistani troops as more and more foreign fighters began to join the fight. The al-Qaeda fighters had set up their main strategic posts at the top of the mountains allowing them to observe the movements of the Pakistan Army infantry and mountaineering troops. The troops called for air strikes which were carried out by PAF F-16s and the army aviation corps, targeting the suspected posts and hidden positions of al-Qaeda. Following the air strikes, the infantry troops redoubled their efforts to gain control of the mountains.

In the night of 18 March 2004, the army troops and foreign fighters again engage in a heavy and bloody gun battle occurred wherein infantry troops had repeatedly beaten the assaults after assaults. After days of fighting, the infantry troops gained control of key positions in the mountains which al-Qaeda had previously held. Sporadic fighting continued as the infantry units began to pursue the al-Qaeda foreign fighters. Soon, all the strategic mountain posts were evacuated by the al-Qaeda fighters as the infantry troops had reached the top of the mountains. By dawn, the infantry troops with the help of 20th Mountain Brigade had taken control of the mountains.

They never surrender. They like to fight and they like to die there... so the only thing I can say is, we have to wait and see.

— Rashid Ahmad, Information ministry, Cited source

In a last attempt to regain their territory, al-Qaeda fighters planned another assault against the army at night which continued until dawn. The army troops and paramilitary officers then counter-attacked, and the battle soon slipped to adjacent mountains as the al-Qaida foreign fighters began to escape. Both sides sustained casualties, and the next morning al-Qaeda fighters began abandoning their positions and retreating from the area. As requested by the theater commander, additional army infantry, combat engineering and Mountain troops were rushed to help the remaining fighting troops. The battle ended soon after as reinforcements arrived and took their positions. With the arrival of the additional mountain troops, the army intensified its search for remaining al-Qaeda fighters. A week later, the Pakistan Army captured the entire mountainous area along with hundreds of al-Qaeda fighters.

== Aftermath ==
Tunnels were discovered at the site of the battle that led into Afghanistan, possibly the Tora Bora region. The military consolidated its position in the area. On 20 March 2004, the ISI's CAD and Military Intelligence, and a unit of troops reportedly saw a mysterious "foreigner" fleeing the siege, the Military Intelligence theorized that it may have been Ayman al-Zawahiri, since Uzbek militant Tohir Yuldashev had earlier escaped to Afghanistan while injured in a battle.

It is possible that some of the (high value) suspects might have escaped through this (Kaloosha) tunnel. It has been there for quite some time. We don't know how effective was the cordon on the first night...during the suspension of military action

— Brigadier-General Mahmood Shah, GOC of 20th Mountaineering Brigade, source

By 23 March 23, 2004, the last fortified area was taken over by the army troops after a week of combat. Later, the 20th Mountain Brigade of Army took control of the mountains and set up posts. The Army also sent its investigators from "M.I. Directorate for High Value Target Acquisition". The Army incurred casualties consisting of 17 soldiers killed, 33 wounded, and 11 captured (all of whom were released on March 28, 2004); the military intelligence inflicted on al-Qaeda losses of 55 fighters killed (majority being Uzbeks and Chechens) and 149 captured. The Battle of Wana also led to the unannounced War in North-West Pakistan.

== See also ==
- Battle of Tora Bora
- Afghan Civil War
- Osama bin Laden
- War in Afghanistan (2001–2021)
- ISI's Covert Action Division
- List of drone strikes in Pakistan
