= Bajaur airstrike =

The Bajaur airstrike may refer to two different airstrikes within Pakistan:

- The Damadola airstrike, which took place on 13 January 2006
- The Chenagai airstrike, which took place on 30 October 2006
