= Jazairi =

Jazairi (and its variant Al Jazairi) is an Arabic origin surname referring to people from Algeria. Notable people with the surname include:

- Abd El Razzaq Al-Jazaïri, Algerian scientist
- Abu Bakr al-Jazaeri (1921–2018), Algerian scholar
- Mufid Mohammad Jawad al-Jazairi (born 1939), Iraqi politician
- Sabah Jazairi, Syrian actress
- Abu Sulayman Al-Jazairi (died 2008), Algerian Al Qaeda militant
- Tahir al-Jazairi (1852–1920), Syrian scholar and educator
