= 2006 Dargai bombing =

Terrorist incident in Pakistan

- Part of War in North-West Pakistan
- Dargai (Khyber Pakhtunkhwa) Dargai (Pakistan)
- Location: 34°30′55.75″N 71°53′45.42″E; Punjab regiment center, Dargai, Malakand District, Khyber Pakhtunkhwa, Pakistan
- Date: 8 November 2006; 08:40 (PST)
- Target: Punjab Regiment
- Attack type: Suicide bombing
- Weapon: Explosive belt
- Deaths: 42
- Injuries: 20
- Victim: Pakistan Army soldiers
- Perpetrator: Pakistani Taliban
- No. of participants: 2
- Defender: Pakistan Army soldiers
- Motive: Retaliation against Chenagai airstrike

On 8 November 2006, a suicide bombing took place at Punjab Regiment Center in Dargai, Khyber Pakistanhtunkhwa, Pakistan that targeted Pakistan army. The attack left 42 soldiers dead while 20 others were wounded. Pakistan Taliban claimed responsibility for the attack.

== Background ==
On 30 October 2006, missiles were launched on a madrassa in Chenagai village of Bajour Agency at around 05:00 am in which 82 people were killed. The motive of the airstrike was to kill Osama bin Laden. The airstrike was carried out by Central Intelligence Agency and Pakistani forces jointly.

== Bombing ==
At around 08:40 (UTC + 05:00), when 130 recruits of Punjab Regiment were preparing for parade, a short bearded suicide bomber wearing cloak shouted "Allah hu Akbar" (God is Great) and blew himself up killing 38 and wounding 22 people at the spot, out of whom, 2 died later rising the death toll to 40. Another suicide bomber failed to explode and was hunted as he tried to escape.

== Aftermath ==
Security forces reached the site and cordoned off the area. Experts from KPK were summoned to Dargai for investigation.

== Attribution and responsibility ==
Initially the security forces blamed the banned militant organization, Tehreek-e-Nafaz-e-Shariat-e-Mohammadi for the attack. Later on, an unidentified caller told a local journalist that Pakistani Taliban had carried out the attack to avenge the attack on a seminary in Bajaur. The caller was referring to the air strike carried out by United States on 30 October on the Bajaur seminary killing 82 people. The caller said the suicide bombing had been carried out by a group led by a hitherto unknown figure Abu Kalim Muhammad Ansari and claimed that it had another 274 volunteers ready to sacrifice their lives.

== Reactions ==
Interior Minister of Pakistan Aftab Ahmad Khan Sherpao condemned the attack saying, "I very strongly condemn the reprehensible and cowardly act of terrorism against the innocent recruits undergoing training at the Punjab Regimental Training Centre in Dargai". Amir Muqam, in a statement, expressed deep sorrow. "Terrorists are neither friends of Islam nor well-wishers of Pakistan," he maintained. CM KPK Akram Khan Durrani said "it is an act of naked aggression which has shaken the conscience of the humanity". Qazi Hussain Ahmed of the Muttahida Majlis-e-Amal said he was saddened by the deaths, but criticised the government for fomenting the bloodshed. "The government is to be blamed for today’s attack. If you kill innocent students and teachers by attacking their school, you should be ready to face such things," he said. President of Awami National Party Asfandyar Wali Khan also expressed deep shock and condoled with the bereaved families. Maulana Samiul Haq expressed his profound grief and shock. Governor of Khyber Pakistanhtunkhwa Ali Muhammad Jan Orakzai strongly condemned the suicide attack, describing it a "heinous act of cowardice". MNA Haroon-ur-Rashid said the people of Bajaur lodged a peaceful protest on every occasion against the killing of innocent students of the seminary.

The attack caused the Prince of Wales (now Charles III) and his wife, the Duchess of Cornwall (now Queen Camilla), to cancel a planned trip to Peshawar. US government officials condemned the attack and praised Pakistan's role in the War on Terror.

== See also ==
- Terrorist incidents in Pakistan in 2006
- June 1993 UNOSOM II attack
