= List of civilian casualties in the war in Afghanistan (2001–2006) =

List of civilian casualties in the war in Afghanistan from 2001 to 2006

2001

- On October 9, 2001, in a news conference in Islamabad, Pakistan, a United Nations spokeswoman reported that a cruise missile had killed four U.N. employees and injured four others in a building several miles east of Kabul. The casualties were Afghans employed as security guards by the Afghan Technical Consultancy, the U.N. demining agency (Afghanistan is the most heavily mined country on the planet). The Taliban reported about 8 to 20 civilian casualties, unconfirmed by independent sources.
- On October 10, 2001, the Sultanpur mosque in Jalalabad was bombed (BBC) twice – once during prayer, and again when rescue workers returned to remove the wounded and the dead. Initial casualty estimates ranged from 15 to 70 in the first attack, and up to 120 in the second. This two-hit bombing was repeated later on November 19, when 32 people were killed in Shamshad and then the rescuers were hit again. Several other mosques were bombed later, such as the Kunduz mosque on October 12 and the particularly deadly bombing of the Kala Shah Pir village mosque on October 23. On the same day, the villages of Darunta, Torghar, and Farmada were bombed, killing between 28 and 100 people.
- On October 11, 2001, the village of Karam was completely destroyed. (The Guardian) Reporters on the scene reported having to hold their noses due to the smell. Between 160 and 200 people, in addition to their livestock, were killed, as reported by the surviving villagers. In response, Donald Rumsfeld stated "We do not have information that validates any of that", but added that Washington's information on the ground was "imperfect". Al-Qaeda was believed to have training camps and ammunition storage tunnels in the area around Karam.
- On October 17, 2001, downtown Kandahar was targeted with bombs and rockets in the area around a ministry building; the bombing destroyed several dozen stores and homes, and killing between 40 and 47 people. This was repeated the following day elsewhere in Kandahar, where bombs near the Kepten intersection destroyed a bazaar and killed between 10 and 47 additional people. This began a relatively deadly few days, where 40 people were killed in the Kabul area on the 18th, several dozen people were killed in Tarin Kot on the 19th, and 60-70 were killed in Herat and 50 killed in Kandahar on the 20th.
- On October 21, 2001, the casualty rate peaked with the bombing of a hospital and mosque in Herat. The 200-bed hospital, used for both military and civilian patients, was reportedly not the target; the target was 300 feet (91 m) away. Approximately 100 bodies were found among the wreckage. On the same day, over 20 people (including 9 children) died when the tractor trailer used by several families to flee Tarin Kut was bombed (similar to an event on October 24); a stray bomb in the Parod Gajadad district of Khair Khana destroyed two homes; in another district of Khair Khana, 18 people were killed when 17 homes were destroyed by a bomb that missed a military base by 1/2 mile (800 m); 5 people from Kabul's Kaluezaman Khan neighborhood were killed; an 8-year-old girl was killed in Macroyan, Kabul; 11 people were killed in Tarin Kut; and 3 were killed in Kandahar city. The following day, the casualty rate didn't fall much, with the coalition stepping up the targeting of fuel trucks and the accidental bombing of homes and shops in several cities, killing well over 100 people.
- On October 23, 2001, the village of Chowkar Kariz was destroyed; testimony from the survivors indicated a casualty number between 52 and 93. Times journalist Paul Rogers reported that "not a single house has been left intact" and that "evidence that this remote spot had ever been used for military or terrorist purposes is non-existent." In the face of opposition from human rights groups, including Human Rights Watch, U.S. officials continued to claim that the town was a "fully legitimate target" and that "the people there are dead because we wanted them dead." This was the last major case of civilian casualties for the next few weeks, as incidents dropped to an average of four per day and an average of about 8 casualties per said attack. The most lethal attack between the 23rd and November 4, 2001, was an attack on residential areas in Kabul on October 29 that took 25 lives.
- On October 26, 2001, twenty-three people were killed in a bombing raid in the village Thori in the Urozgan province.
- On November 5, 2001, an upswing in civilian casualties occurred with major attacks on Kabul and villages in the Balkh province. The most deadly of the attacks occurred in Ogopruk village, near Mazar e Sharif, where 36 people in a residential area were killed by stray bombs. The daily civilian casualty rate remained over 50 through November 10, where it peaked with attacks on three villages near Khakrez that killed approximately 125 people.
- On November 13, 2001, an American missile went "awry", according to the Pentagon, and destroyed the Al-Jazeera bureau in Kabul. In (November 27, 2003 – Hearst Newspapers, www.commondreams.org/scriptfiles/views03/1127-07.htm).
- On November 17, 2001, 62 people were killed in the bombing of a Madrassa in Khost, while 42 nomads were killed near Maiwand, two families with a total of 30 people were killed in Charikar village, 28 people were killed in Zani Khel village, and other scattered attacks took another 13 lives.
- November 18, 2001 proved to be one of the more deadly days of bombing in the conflict. Scores of Gypsies were killed in Kundar, 100-150 people were killed in villages near Khanabad in an attack described by witnesses as "carpet bombing", 35 people were killed in Shamshad village, and 24 in Garikee Kah village. Several of these villages were near the front lines, and were likely hit by stray bombs. A similar error occurred on November 20 when 40 people were killed as their mud houses collapsed from a stray bomb in a village near the Kunduz front line.
- An incident, similar to the October 9 incident, killed 12 people at another mine clearing facility.
- On November 25, 2001, 92 people (including 18 women and 7 children) were killed by bombing in Kandahar. On the same day, 70 people were killed when cluster bombs were dropped in the Kunduz area, as well as scattered deaths in Adha village and Takhta-Pal.
- On December 1, 2001, about 100 people were killed by 25 bombs in their houses in the village of Kama Ado. Kandahar city reported numerous civilian casualties, while four trucks and five busses carrying passengers fleeing the war were hit on a highway, killing 30. Talkhel and Balut villages suffered 50 casualties, while Chperagem village suffered 28. About 20 people were killed in the Agam district, while 15 people died in refugee vehicles in Arghisan, and over 30 people died in the Jada area near Herat. It proved to be another particularly lethal day in the conflict for civilians. The subsequent days were little improved. About 150 civilians died across the country on December 2 in a variety of villages. In the same week, over 300 villagers in the white mountains near Tora Bora, as US forces attacked villages which fighters passed through, hoping to kill any which remained in the area.
- After the Tora Bora bombing campaign, the effort dispersed to kill Taliban and al-Qaeda members fleeing with their families, and focused on the Paktia and Paktika provinces. Numerous villages were hit shortly after the leaders passed through, leaving a chain of destruction following their path. The first place to be struck was Mashikhel in Paktia, in what inaccurate intelligence had said was a Taliban base. The city's mosque (Saqawa) was hit, killing 10 and injuring 12. The bombing then moved to Mashkhel, killing another 16 civilians. On December 20, 2001, U.S. AC-130 gunships and Navy fighters attacked and destroyed a convoy in Afghanistan believed to be carrying the leaders and struck surrounding villages. The convoy turned out to be carrying tribal elders heading to the inauguration ceremony for Hamid Karzai; between 20 and 65 people died. Overnight on the 27th, US forces struck at the village of Naka. Between 25 and 40 people were killed, 5-25 houses were destroyed, and 4-60 people were injured; however, US forces got one of their targets (the Taliban's Minister of Security, Qari Ahmadullah) and two sons of a commander they were also seeking (Maulvi Ahmed Taha). Taha himself was not killed in the attack. The next night, the village of Shekhan was bombed, killing 15 civilians and destroying three houses.
- The following day (December 31, 2001), one of the largest single incidents of civilian casualties in the entire war occurred: at least one U.S. fighter jet, a B-52 bomber and two helicopters swooped on Qalaye Niazi near Gardez, killing over 100 people. The area was littered with craters; one person (Janat Gul) recounted how all other 24 members of her family were killed. Body parts were reported scattered throughout the streets; the United Nations has confirmed that all of the dead were civilians.

2002

- On July 1, 2002, 48 people at a wedding party in a village in Oruzgan province were killed, and a further 117 injured, in a bombing raid. New figures from October 2006 say that 46 people were killed. The name of the village is Del Rawad, though early reports gave its name as Kakrakai or Kakrak. Gunfire meant to celebrate the wedding was apparently mistaken by US military for hostile gunfire. A B-52 bomber and AC-130 gunship were both involved in the incident, which reportedly went on for over an hour. The victims included many women and children. Some survivors were treated in Mirwai Hospital in Kandahar, and at least four children were treated at military hospitals in Bagram and Kandahar. The incident resulted in a formal protest, and later a warning, from the Afghan government. An anti-American rally was held in Kabul on July 5 as a protest against the incident. On July 3, US President George Bush expressed "deep condolences for the loss of human life", and US authorities later stated that the area affected by the bombing would be rebuilt. Several inquiries into the incident were undertaken. According to The Times, a preliminary UN report has stated that US forces arrived at the scene of the bombing raid and removed vital evidence.

2003

- February 2003 – At least 17 civilians, mostly women and children, were killed in coalition bombing raids in a mountainous region Helmand province.
- February 2003 – Reuters reported that according to locals, 8 civilians were killed in the Baghran Valley area of Helmand province when a U.S. bomber and gunship attacked the area.
- April 9, 2003 – Eleven Afghans, seven of them women, were killed and one wounded when a stray U.S. laser-guided bomb hit a house on the outskirts of Shkin in Paktika province.
- September 2003 – At least eight civilians died in a U.S. air strike in the Naw Bahar district of the Zabul province that also killed a Taliban commander.
- October 30, 2003 – In a small hamlet near the village of Aranj in the Waygal district of Nuristan province, Afghanistan, six people of the same family were killed when a house was bombarded by U.S. warplanes. The house belonged to a former provincial governor, Ghulam Rabbani, who was in Kabul at the time. The raid was aimed at Gulbuddin Hekmatyar and Mullah Faqirullah, both of whom had left the area just hours before. The victims (three children, an adolescent, a young man and an old woman) were all relatives of Mullah Rabbani.
- November 15, 2003 – Six civilians died when a U.S. warplane dropped a bomb in the Barmal district of Paktika province.
- December 5, 2003 – Near Gardez in Paktia province, an air and ground attack by U.S. special forces on a compound, used by a rebel commander Mullah Jalani to store munitions, killed six children and two adults.
- December 6. 2003 – According to both villagers and the U.S. military, 9 children – 7 boys and 2 girls from the ages of 9 to 12 – and a 25-year-old man were killed when two U.S. A-10 Thunderbolt II planes attacked the village of Hutala with rockets and guns. Mullah Wazir, the intended target, was not at home at the time. U.S. ambassador Zalmay Khalilzad stated the next day that Wazir was killed in the attack, but retracted the statement shortly after. Names and ages of the children killed: Habibullah, 11; Obaidullah, 10; Faizullah, 9; Ismail Jan, 11; Nabi Jan, 9; Habibullah, 12; Aminullah, 9; Bibi Toara, 10; and Bibi Tamama, 9.

2004

- January 18, 2004 – 11 civilians – 4 children and 7 adults – were killed by a U.S. air strike on a house in the village of Saghatho.

2005

- July 1, 2005 – An "unknown number" of noncombatants were killed in an airstrike in Kunar province. A second source dates the incident on July 3 and places the number of victims at 17.

2006

- January 14, 2006 – Several missiles were fired from a CIA-operated unmanned Predator drones over the Afghan border into the Pakistani village of Damadola in the Bajaur area. 18 civilians were killed.
- March 14, 2006 – Canadian troops in Kandahar open fire on a taxi, killing one of its passengers, Nasrat Ali Hassan.
- May 22, 2006 – 17 villagers were killed when coalition warplanes attacked Taliban forces in Kandahar Province. The U.S. military, which said dozens of militants also died in the fighting, expressed regret over the deaths.
- August 22, 2006 – A 10-year-old boy riding as a passenger on a motorcycle was shot and killed by Canadian troops in Kandahar.
- August 26, 2006 – Canadian troops shot and killed an Afghan policeman with 6 others injured.
- October 18, 2006 – A rocket hit a house during a nighttime clash between suspected Taliban insurgents and NATO and Afghan security forces in the farming village of Tajikai, 135 miles (217 km) west of Kandahar city. The rocket was fired from an aircraft and killed 13 villagers inside the home. A NATO spokesman said alliance jets and helicopters fired rockets and dropped bombs on Taliban positions in the area after 2 am October 18, 2006, but could not confirm that they hit a civilian house. He added that the Taliban had been using mortars in the area of the clash. About 100 families live in Tajikai.
- October 19, 2006 – Airstrikes by NATO helicopters hunting Taliban fighters ripped through three dried mud homes in southern Afghanistan as villagers slept early October 18, 2006. At least nine civilians were killed, including women and children, said residents and the provincial governor. Angry villagers in Ashogho condemned the attack, which set back NATO's hopes of winning local support for their tough counterinsurgency campaign. The airstrikes came at about the same time a rocket struck a house in a village to the west, reportedly killing 13 people. NATO's International Security Assistance Force said in a statement that October 18, 2006 operation in Kandahar was believed to have caused several civilian casualties. The alliance said the operation was meant to detain people involved in roadside bomb attacks in Panjwayi district, which borders Zhari District. NATO said it regretted any civilian casualties and that it makes every effort to minimize the risk of collateral damage.
- October 26, 2006 – Between 40 and 60 villagers were killed in two separate night air raids, followed by mortar and rocket attacks against villages in the Panjwayi district of Kandahar province.
- November 16, 2006 – British troops open fire at a vehicle and killed two of its occupant, wounding a young girl, near Girish, in Helmand Province.
- December 12, 2006 – An elderly motorcyclist was shot and killed by Canadian troops in Kandahar.

== See also ==
- Civilian casualties in the war in Afghanistan (2001–2014)
