= Naik Muhammad Wazir =

Pakistani militant leader

Naik Muhammad Wazir نیک محمد وزیر
- Naik Muhammad in c. 2004

Leader of the Pro-Taliban Militia
- In office c. 2003 – 18 June 2004
- Succeeded by: Haji Omar

Personal details
- Born: 1975 Kalosha, South Waziristan, Khyber Pakhtunkhwa, Pakistan
- Died: 18 June 2004 (aged 28–29) South Waziristan, Khyber Pakhtunkhwa, Pakistan

Military service
- Allegiance: Afghan Taliban (1995–2004)
- Years of service: Early 1990s–2004
- Rank: Leader of Pro-Taliban Tribal Militia
- Battles/wars: Afghanistan Conflict; Afghan Civil War; War in Afghanistan; War in North-West Pakistan; Battle of Wanna

Naik Muhammad Wazir (Pashto/Urdu: نیک محمد وزیر, also Naik Mohammed; 1975 – 18 June 2004) was a prominent Pakistani mujahideen jihadist and militant leader.

He was assassinated in a US drone strike in South Waziristan, FATA, Pakistan in 2004. This was the first CIA drone strike inside Pakistan.

== Early life ==
Naik Muhammad belonged to the Yargul Khail subclan of the Ahmadzai Wazir Pashtun tribe. According to Pakistan's Dawn News, his father:

"...had inherited a maliki which entitled him to token government allowances as well as a vote in the restricted franchise system and a khasadari, a political policeman's job which comes under a tribal system of distribution called nikat."

Here, a Maliki being inherited is probably using the term in the sense where it refers to a position of political intermediary and local representative, or Malik.

Naik's father, Nawaz Khan, was a member of the tribal elite and owned property in the village of Kalosha, South Waziristan, close to the Afghanistan border: Naik Muhammad was his second child. Muhammad was expelled from one madrassa for poor discipline. He received his early education at an Islamic school run by Jamiat-i-Ulema-i-Islam leader Noor Muhammad.

Naik studied for five years at the Jamia Darul Uloom Waziristan. One of his teachers stated that he was a strong-willed student:

"Naik never had an intellectual mind, but some other personality traits became evident during his stay at the Darul Uloom.

He showed himself to be a hard-headed boy, endowed with an impenetrable soul and an obstinate determination to carry out his will no matter how mindless it might be."

He was later admitted to a college run by the Awami National Party (ANP) but did not complete his studies, choosing instead to start a shop in the main bazaar of Wana.

== With the Taliban in Afghanistan ==
During Naik Muhammad's childhood, Wana was a significant training base for mujahideen fighters in the 1980s Soviet–Afghan War. Around the age of 19, Muhammad joined the Taliban, recruited by his friend Mohammad Gul. He and Gul served with the forces of Saif-ur-Rehman Mansoor. He rose rapidly in the ranks, becoming a sub-commander of a Waziri Taliban unit, and fighting in battles against the Northern Alliance forces of Ahmad Shah Massoud in Bagram, Bamyan and Panjshir. He reportedly ultimately led a force of 3,000 Taliban at one time.

During this period, he reportedly met al-Qaeda leader Osama bin Laden at the Rash Khor training camp south of Kabul. He also met bin Laden's deputy, Ayman al-Zawahiri, and reportedly also became friends-in-arms with Taliban minister Mullah Nazir, the leader of the Islamic Movement of Uzbekistan, Tohir Yoʻldosh, and Uighur separatist leader Hasan Mahsum.

== Return to Waziristan ==
After the Taliban regime fell in late 2001, Muhammad returned to Wana, where he reportedly facilitated the escape of many other Taliban and foreign fighters from Afghanistan.

Muhammad formed a new organization called Jaishul al-Qiba al-Jihadi al-Siri al-Alami. This group allegedly ran training camps in South Waziristan for the Taliban and Al-Qaeda and produced anti-Western literature and videos for indoctrination purposes. He reportedly became immensely wealthy, owning over 40 vehicles by December 2003.

Some members of this group were also recruited into Jundullah, a militant anti-government organization. Jundullah members Attaur Rehman and Abu Musab al-Balochi (al-Baloshi) would later be implicated in the attempted assassination of a senior military official in Karachi. Jundullah's media studio, Ummat, was allegedly connected with Al-Qaeda's media front organization, the Al-Sahab Foundation, and Jundullah itself with Al-Qaeda leader Khalid Shaikh. Ummat also produced anti-Western and anti-government videos.

In April 2004, Muhammed, as leader of anti-government militant forces in South Waziristan fighting in the Waziristan War, accepted an offer of a cease-fire and amnesty with Pakistani forces. The ceasefire lasted only briefly before conflict resumed, however.

== Assassination ==
At the time of his death Mohammad was accused of having provided a safe haven for Taliban and Al-Qaeda fighters, and also to fighters from Chechnya and other conflicts. When he was killed, Voice of America called him as an Al-Qaida facilitator.

Only a day after the famous Shakai agreement with Pakistan's military in April 2004, in a long interview with the Voice of America Pashto Correspondent Mukhtar Ahmad, Naik Mohammad disclosed that he would never abandon his jihad against the US and other allied forces in Afghanistan. A few miles away from Wana, in this face-to-face radio interview, Mohammad vowed to continue his support for Al-Qaeda and Taliban and argued that no peace agreement with the Pakistani government could compel him to force the Al-Qaeda fighters and other foreign militants to leave Pakistan's tribal area.

Despite Naik Mohammad's hatred for the US and Western media, he often appeared on their Pashto channels. He had stated on several occasions that VOA and Radio Azadi were the mouthpieces of the US government and that its broadcasters and reporters are the 'paid agents' or 'spies' for the US.

On 18 June 2004, after signing the Shakai Peace deal, he was killed in a missile attack. The Pakistani army stated that it was responsible for Muhammad's death, but PBS Frontline reported in 2006 that he had been killed along with four other suspected militants and two children by a missile from an American Predator UAV, allegedly as they sat eating dinner. According to Mark Mazzetti, author of The Way of the Knife: The CIA, a Secret Army, and a War at the Ends of the Earth, the killing of Naik Muhammed (who had been marked by Pakistan as an enemy of the state), was a condition for a secret deal between the United States and Pakistan to allow the use by the CIA of drones in Pakistan airspace to kill individuals designated as enemies of the US.

According to Asad Durrani, a retired 3-star rank lieutenant general and former director-general of the Pakistan Army's Military Intelligence, Naik Mohammad Wazir was killed by an American drone.
