= Terrorist incidents in Pakistan in 2006 =

In 2006, 30 terrorist attacks, including 10 of a sectarian nature, took place in Pakistan, leaving 100 people dead and 230 others injured.

== January - April ==
- 25 January:- At least six people were killed and five others hurt after a bus ran over a landmine in Dera Bugti District, Balochistan.
- 5 February:- A bomb explosion killed 13 people including three army personnel and injured 18 on a Lahore-bound bus en route from Quetta in Kolpur, Bolan District, Balochistan. No groups claimed of responsibility for the attack.
- 9 February:- Sectarian violence marred the holiest day of the Shiite calendar, with at least 36 people killed and more than 100 wounded in attacks and clashes in Pakistan and Afghanistan. The violence erupted with a suspected suicide attack on Shiites in Hangu, in the northwestern part of the country, as they celebrated Day of Ashura.
- 2 March:- A power suicide car bomb attack in the high security zone near the US Consulate, Karachi, killed four people including a US diplomat, a day before President George W. Bush was to reach Pakistan.
- 10 March:- At least 26 people, mostly women and children, were killed in Dera Bugti District, Balochistan after their bus hit a landmine. Tribal rebels had planted landmines in the area.
- 11 April:- Over 50 people, including Sunni (Barelvi) scholars, were killed in a bomb explosion at a religious gathering celebrating the birthday of the Islamic prophet Muhammad in Nishtar Park, Karachi.

== June - August ==
- 12 June:- At least five people were killed and 17 wounded in a bomb attack at a Quetta hotel.
- 15 June:- Unidentified gunmen killed a senior prison official Amanullah Khan Niazi and four others in the southern Pakistani city of Karachi.
- 16 June:- Two female teachers and two children were shot dead in Khoga Chiri village in Orakzai Agency.
- 14 July:- Allama Hassan Turabi, a Shiite religious scholar and chief of Tehrik-e-Jafaria Pakistan, and his 12-year-old nephew were killed in a suicide attack near his Abbas Town residence. The suicide bomber was later identified as Abdul Karim, a Bangladeshi-speaking, resident of a shanty town in the central city area of Karachi.
- 26 August:- Tribal leader Nawab Akbar Bugti was killed in a battle between tribal militants and government forces in Balochistan. At least five soldiers and at least 30 rebels are thought to have died too.
- 26–31 August:- Akbar Bugti's killing sparked five days of rioting that left six people dead, dozens wounded and 700 under arrest.

== September - November ==
- 8 September:- At least six people were killed and 17 injured, four of them seriously, when a powerful bomb blast hit the Rakhni bazaar area of Barkhan District, Balochistan.
- 6 October:- 17 people were killed in fighting between Sunni and Shia Muslims over a dispute over ownership of the shrine to 18th Century figure Syed Amir Anwar Shah shrine in Pakistan's Orakzai tribal region.
- 20 October:- A bomb blast killed at least six people and left 21 injured in a busy shopping district of Peshawar.
- 8 November:- A suicide bomber killed 42 Pakistani Army soldiers and injured 20 in the northwestern town of Dargai, apparently in retaliation to the Chenagai airstrike which killed 80 people in the same Bajaur region in the previous month. This was the second such attack on the Army since the 2004 assassination attempt on Karachi Corps commander.
