= Baghar China airstrike =

- Part of Insurgency in Khyber Pakhtunkhwa
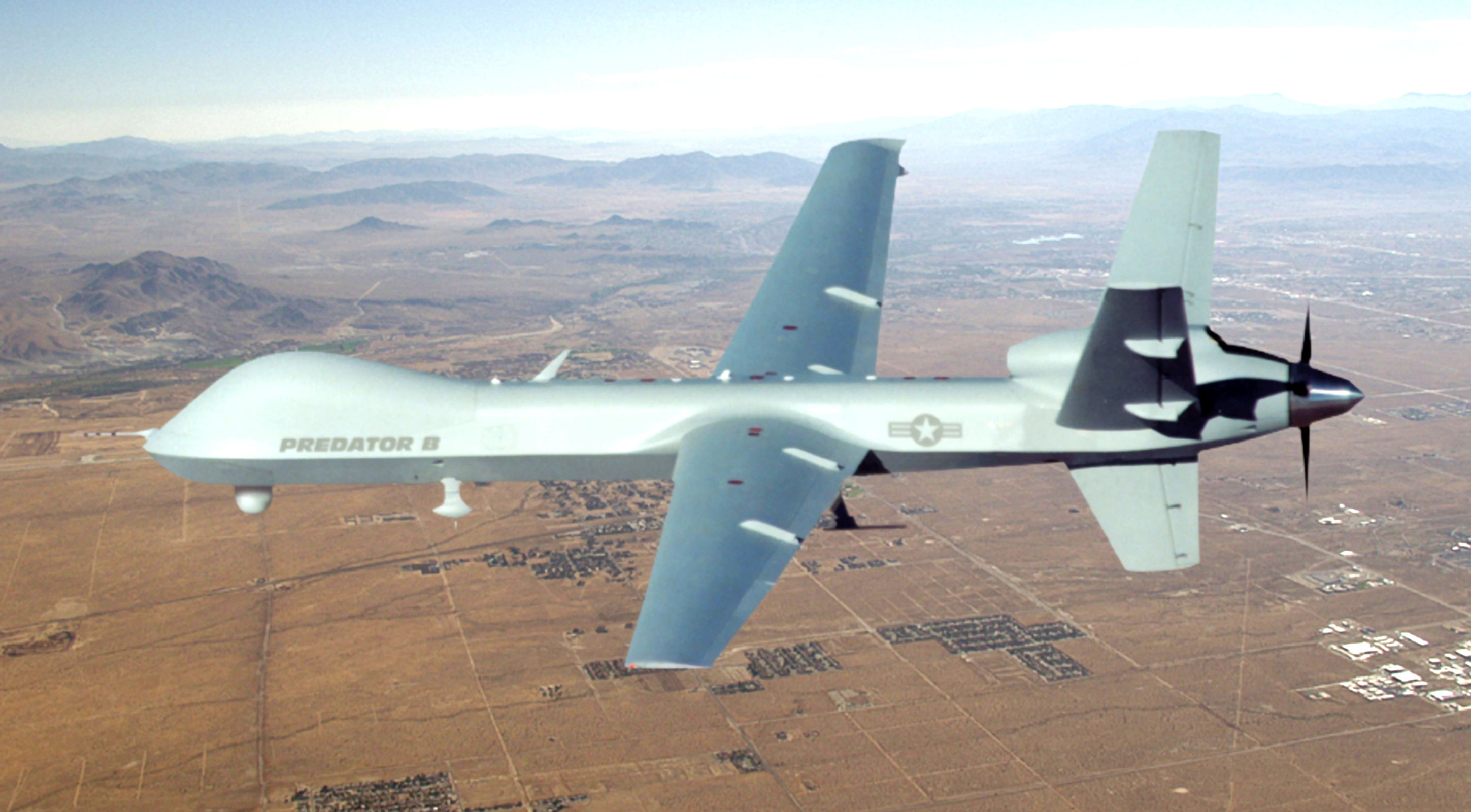
- The MQ-9 Reaper began operation in Afghanistan in Oct. 2007
- Type: UAV attack
- Location: South Waziristan, Pakistan.
- Target: Taliban fighters
- Date: 17 September 2008
- Executed by: United States
- Casualties: 5 killed 6 injured

The Baghar China UAV strike (Pashto: د بغر چينې هوايي بريد) happened in the evening on 17 September 2008, when four missiles fired from a United States Air Force drone aircraft hit the village of Baghar China in the mountains of South Waziristan, in the Federally Administered Tribal Areas (FATA) of Pakistan, about 4 kilometres from the Afghan border and 55 kilometres west of Wana, the main town in the region and close to Angur Ada, the village that was raided by US commandos on 3 September. The missiles hit a militant training camp, killing five and injuring at least six people.

This was the sixth confirmed U.S. missile attack inside Pakistan since the end of August 2008, and comes two days after a Pakistan–U.S. standoff on 15 September 2008, in which Pakistani forces fired shots into the air, in order to deter U.S. forces from entering Pakistani territory. The incident came as the top US military commander, Admiral Michael Mullen met Pakistan's most senior army officer, General Ashfaq Kayani and prime-minister Yousuf Raza Gilani in Islamabad to discuss growing tension over US attacks along the border.

== See also ==
- Insurgency in Khyber Pakhtunkhwa
- List of drone strikes in Pakistan
