= Haji Omar =

Haji Omar (1951 – 26 October 2008) was the amir (leader) the Pakistani Taliban, a jihadist militant organisation that has been designated as a terrorist organisation by the United Nations, the United States and the Government of Pakistan. He was named as the terrorist group's amir after the killing of Nek Muhammad Wazir. Haji Omar was killed in a US airstrike in Pakistan on 26 October 2008.
