= Miramshah airstrike =

- Part of Insurgency in Khyber Pakhtunkhwa
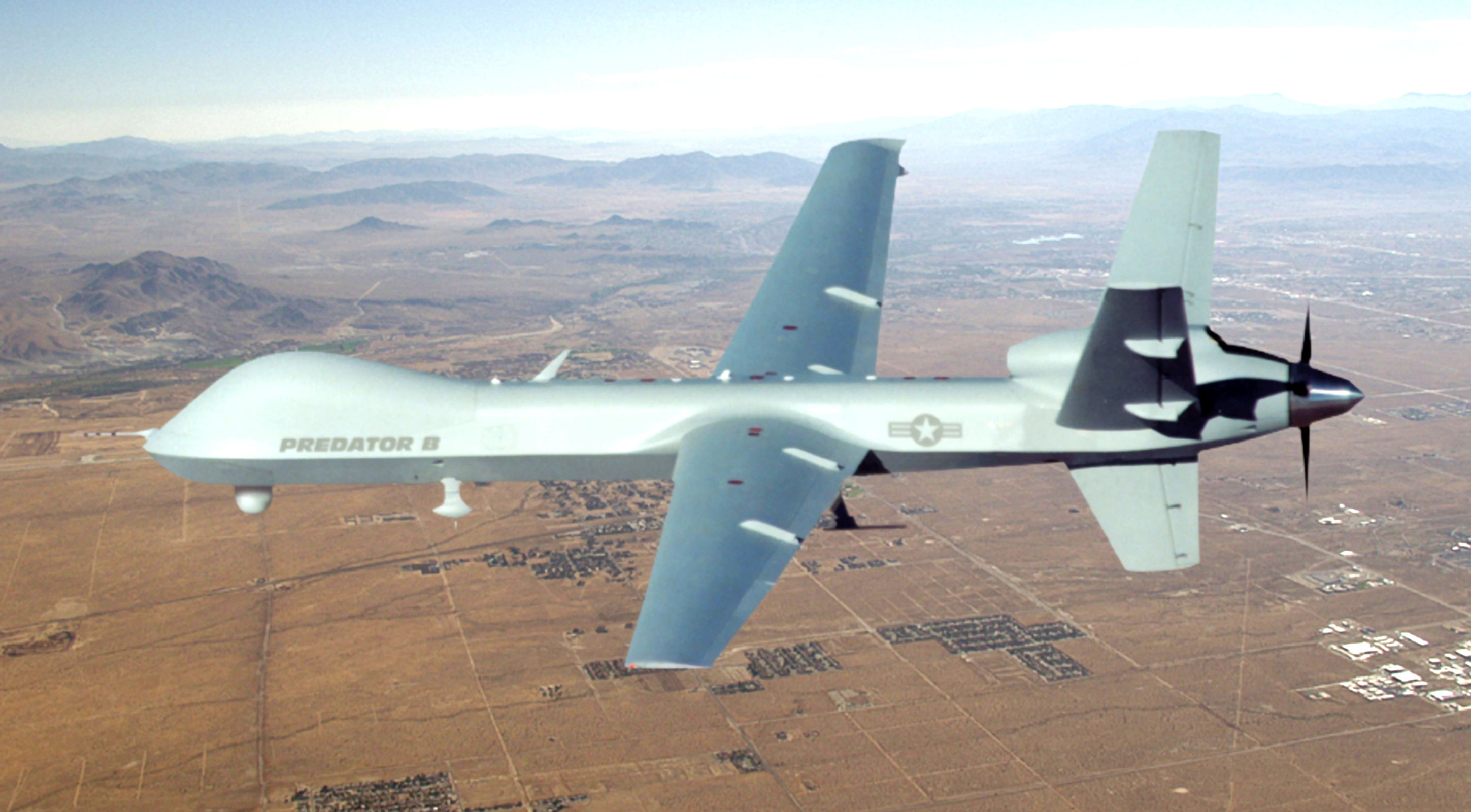
- The MQ-9 Reaper began operation in Afghanistan in Oct. 2007
- Type: UAV attack
- Location: North Waziristan, Pakistan
- Target: Taliban fighters
- Date: 12 September 2008
- Executed by: United States
- Casualties: 12 killed

The Miramshah airstrike took place on Friday 12 September 2008 in Miramshah in North Waziristan in the Federally Administered Tribal Areas (FATA) in Pakistan. It was part of a series of attacks targeting presumed militants, and was carried out by a United States Air Force drone aircraft. It took advantage of the power vacuum in Pakistan, following the fall of Pervez Musharraf on 18 August 2008. The missiles hit two buildings – in one three women and two children were killed, and in the other seven Taliban militants died.

President George W. Bush had two months prior to this attack issued a classified order authorizing US raids against militants in Pakistan without prior approval from Islamabad.

Missile strikes have traditionally provoked an outpouring of public resentment that Musharraf's political opponents used to help drive him from power. Many of those opponents are now seated in the new government – giving it broader political support and fewer high-profile critics.

I think the government really is not concerned much about the domestic fallout because there is no leader who would challenge its position or who would rally people around him and launch a country-wide protest. So the coalition forces, the Americans, are taking full advantage of the situation where there is a sort of vacuum as far as leadership is concerned.

— Rustam Shah Mohmand, Pakistan's former ambassador to Afghanistan

The attack came at the same time as American and international troops was fighting Taliban and al-Qaeda militants close by in neighboring Afghanistan. The upsurge in strikes alarmed Pakistani military and government officials, who said it seriously undermined their counter-insurgency operations. Pakistan had repeatedly stated, that it would not allow foreign forces onto its territory and that it would vigorously protect its sovereignty. It said that cross border raids were not the best way of fighting the "war against terror".

== See also ==
- Insurgency in Khyber Pakhtunkhwa
- United States and state terrorism
- List of drone strikes in Pakistan
