= Sangeen Zadran =

Afghan Terrorist

Mullah Sangeen Zadran
- Born: 1976 or 1979
- Died: 5 September 2013
- Cause of death: CIA drone strike
- Military career
- Allegiance: Haqqani network
- Rank: Operational commander

Mullah Sangeen Zadran (1976 or 1979 − 5 September 2013) was an Afghan militant and shadow governor of Paktika province. Zadran was an operational commander of the Haqqani network, an Islamist insurgent group. He was held responsible for the capture of American soldier Bowe Bergdahl. In 2011, he was added to the list of specially designated global terrorists by the United States of America. According to the U.S. military, Zadran was the leader of one of the most resilient militant groups based in Afghanistan. He was killed in a CIA drone strike on 5 September 2013. His younger brother, Bilal Zadran, was nominated as the new official commander of the Haqqani group. A photo of Sangeen's corpse was published on a jihadist forum in October 2013.
