= Lashkar al-Zil =

Paramilitary organization

Fighters of Lashkar al-Zil in Swat, Pakistan.

The Lashkar al-Zil (Urdu: لشکر الضل; the Shadow Army), also known as Jaish al-Usrah, or the Army of the Protective Shield, is a paramilitary organization linked to al-Qaeda and descended from the 055 Brigade. According to Syed Saleem Shahzad, it "comprises the Pakistani Taliban, 313 Brigade, the Afghan Taliban, Hezb-e-Islami Afghanistan and former Iraqi Republican Guards". Lashkar al-Zil has reportedly been led by Khalid Habib al Shami, Abdullah Said al Libi, and Ilyas Kashmiri.

The Lashkar al-Zil has been involved in attacks in Afghanistan's eastern and southern provinces. News reports have linked it to several specific attacks, including the Camp Chapman attack and the Sudhnati suicide bombing. The group have not claimed any attacks since 2013 and a year later was officially merged with AQIS.
