= Abu Zubair al-Masri =

Egyptian al-Qaeda member

Abu Zubair al-Masri was a top Al-Qaeda operative originally from Egypt. He was an explosives expert. He was killed in a drone attack on November 22, 2008, in the village of Ali Khel in North Waziristan. He was holding an operational meeting with 4 others including Rashid Rauf who also were killed. The information about the location of al-Masri was provided to the Americans by Pakistani authorities.
