= Upper Kurram Tehsil =

Upper Kurram تحصیل کرم بالا پورتنۍ کرم تحصیل
- Tehsil
- Location of Upper Kurram Tehsil in the Federally Administered Tribal Areas
- Coordinates: 33°52′11″N 70°5′59″E
- Country: Pakistan
- Region: Khyber Pakhtunkhwa
- District: Kurram District

Government
  - Nazim: Muzammil Hussain (MWM)

Population (2017)
  - Tehsil: 253,478
  - Urban: 5,502
  - Rural: 247,976
- Time zone: UTC+5 (PST)

Upper Kurram Tehsil is a subdivision located in Kurram District, Khyber Pakhtunkhwa, Pakistan. The population is 253,478 according to the 2017 census.

== History ==
In 2014, Upper Kurram's Assistant Political Agent Maqsood Hassan was arrested by the National Accountability Bureau on corruption charges.

In November 2017, a US drone strike was carried out on a house in Ghozgarhy, Upper Kurram. This action was condemned by the Foreign Office. Four people were killed in this strike.

== Geography ==
=== Adjacent administrative units ===
- Sherzad District, Nangarhar Province, Afghanistan (north)
- Khogyani District, Nangarhar Province, Afghanistan (northeast)
- Pachir Aw Agam District, Nangarhar Province, Afghanistan (northeast)
- Central Kurram F.R. (east)
- Lower Kurram Tehsil (southeast)
- Zazi Maidan District, Khost Province, Afghanistan (southwest)
- Dand Aw Patan District, Paktia Province, Afghanistan (southwest)
- Zazi District, Paktia Province, Afghanistan (west)

== Demographics ==
Upper Kurram is predominantly Shiite.

== See also ==
- Parachinar
- List of tehsils of Khyber Pakhtunkhwa
