= Abu Sulayman Al-Jazairi =

Algerian al-Qaeda member

- Born: 1963; Algeria
- Died: 14 May 2008 (aged 44–45); Damadola, Bajaur District, Pakistan
- Military career
- Allegiance: Al-Qaeda
- Branch: Al-Qaeda central (?–2008)
- Rank: Al-Qada officer and Weapons instructor
- Conflicts: War in Afghanistan (2001–present); War in North-West Pakistan

Abu Sulayman Jazairi (died 14 May 2008) was a senior leader of Al-Qaeda. He is originally from Algeria and was killed in Pakistan.

== Operations ==
Jazairi was known as a weapons expert and was trained with planning attacks on Western targets. He was involved in training Al-Qaeda terrorists.

== Death ==
Jazairi and several other men, were killed by a drone attack launched from a Predator UAV, in Damadola, Bajaur District, on 14 May 2008.
