= Midhat Mursi =

Egyptian chemist and alleged bomb maker

Midhat Mursi al-Sayid Umar (Arabic: مدحت مرسي السيد عمر), also known as Abu Khabab al-Masri (Arabic: أبو خباب المصري; 29 April 1953 in Egypt – 28 July 2008 in Pakistan) was a chemist and alleged top bomb maker for al-Qaeda and part of Osama bin Laden's inner circle. The United States had a $5 million bounty on his head. Although reported to have been killed in a U.S. attack in January 2006, he survived and intelligence officials believe he went on to attempt to resurrect al-Qaeda's program to develop or obtain weapons of mass destruction. On 28 July 2008, Mursi was killed in an American drone attack in South Waziristan, Pakistan.

== Al-Qaeda activities ==
Umar is believed by U.S. authorities to have run the infamous Derunta training camp in Afghanistan where he is reported to have used dogs and other animals for his chemical experiments. He is also alleged to have written an explosives manual, and to have personally trained Richard Reid, the so-called "shoe bomber", as well as Zacarias Moussaoui. The manual is still in use by al-Qaeda operatives today.

== Wrong photo ==
The CIA acknowledged on 26 January 2006 that they had been using a photo of Abu Hamza al-Masri in their wanted photo for Midhat Mursi, who shared the similar alias "Abu Khabab al Masri". Mursi's poster at the Rewards for Justice Program was changed to a different photo.

== Misreported death ==
He was reported to have been killed in the Damadola airstrike in Pakistan on 13 January 2006 along with several other al-Qaeda operatives. The target of the strike was Ayman al-Zawahiri, al-Qaeda's then-number 2 man. Pakistani intelligence originally confirmed Mursi's death in the airstrike along with al-Zawahiri's alleged son-in-law, Abdul Rehman al-Maghribi, but on 8 September 2007, the Washington Post, citing "U.S. and Pakistani officials", said that all the dead in that raid had been locals.

== Death ==
On 28 July 2008, the Pentagon confirmed al-Masri was killed in a missile strike in Pakistan that also killed five other militants including Ibrahim, the son of Ahmad Salama Mabruk.

== Family ==
Mursi's son, Mohammed al-Masri, was born in 1980 in Aqaba, Jordan. He has been associated with the Islamic State of Iraq and the Levant as well as al-Qaeda, though he has expressed dissatisfaction with the conduct of the former.
