= Ghozgarhy =

Ghozgarhy غوز گڑھی
- Village
- Location in Khyber Pakhtunkhwa Ghozgarhy (Pakistan)
- Coordinates: 33°47′N 70°00′E
- Country: Pakistan
- Region: Khyber Pakhtunkhwa
- District: Kurram District
- Tehsil: Upper Kurram

Population (2017)
  - Total: 7,349
- Time zone: UTC+5 (PST)
  - Summer (DST): UTC+6 (PDT)

Ghozgarhy, Ghoz Garhi, or Ghozgarhi is a Pakistani village and area located in Upper Kurram, Kurram District, Khyber Pakhtunkhwa. The population is 7,349 according to the 2017 census. Ghozgarhy is located near the border of Pakistan with Paktia, Afghanistan. It is a Sunni village.

== History ==
In November 2017, a US drone strike was carried out on a house in Ghozgarhy. This action was condemned by the Foreign Office. Four people were killed in this strike.
