= Abd El Razzaq Al-Jazaïri =

- Born: 17th century Algiers
- Died: 18th century

Academic work
- Main interests: Medicine, Pharmacology

Abd El Razzaq Ibn Mouhammed Ibn Hamadouch Al-Jazaïri (Arabic: عبد الرزاق الجزائري), also known as Abd El Razzaq Al-Jazaïri, was an important 17-18th-century Algerian Muslim physician and scientist. His most important work was Kachef Eroumouz fi eharh-El-aquakir ou El-alchbab (Revealing the mysteries and effects of drugs and plants), which is a treatise on medical subject classified in alphabetical order. This book was very successful in Algeria and Maghreb, and more generally throughout all of the Arab world, and influenced Islamic medicine.

The physician and historian Nicholas Lucien Leclerc writes that he can be considered as the last major representative of Arab medicine.

== Biography ==
Very little is known about him, other than that he was born in the 17th century in the State of Algiers and died in the 18th century. In his book "Revealing the mysteries and the effects of drugs and plants", Abd El Razzaq Al-Jazaïri informs us that he collected certain pharmacological knowledge in Cairo during his pilgrimage to Mecca, in 1130 AH (i.e. during the year 1717 and 1718 of the Gregorian calendar).

Abd El Razzaq Al-Jazaïri was influenced by various treatises of medicine of the 16 century Arab Ottoman physician Daoud Al-Antaki, notably by his book Tedkret; but also by the treatises of medicine of the 13 century Ibn Beithar.

== Works ==
=== Revealing the mysteries and effects of drugs and plants ===
After a definition and a brief description, the book gives the elementary qualities, the general properties, the special properties and the special uses of each drug with the dosage and the substitutes. Its work is preceded by an introduction on the general properties of drugs and preservation methods. The book describes more than 987 drugs and substances.

=== Correction of temperament according to the rules of the treatment ===
Abd El Razzaq Al-Jazaïri wrote in 1748 Tadil El-Mizadj Bisabai Koudin El Iladj (Correction of temperament according to the rules of the treatment) which is a book that deals with genital functions, their disorders and their treatment.

=== Others ===
The manuscript of the national library of Algiers has as a subtitle drawn in red ink:

"Fourth volume of the book on simple medicines, description of their name - Work of the respectable Abd El Razzaq Ibn Mouhammed Al-Jazaïri (May God grant him missericorde, grant him his forgiveness and give him access to the highest degrees)"

According to Gabriel Colin, this shows clearly that the book 'Revealing the mysteries and the effects of drugs and plants' is only a small part of the work of Abd El Razzaq Al-Jazaïri.
