= Shin Warsak =

Pakistani Village

Coordinates: 32°16′N 69°31′E

Shin Warsak is a village in the South Waziristan District of Pakistan's Khyber Pakhtunkhwa province. The village is situated approximately 5 kilometres southwest of Wana and 10 kilometres east of the Afghan border. In 2007, the area was the site of the Shinwar Massacre, in which 20 foreign nationals were killed.
