= Chenagai airstrike =

2006 airstrike in Bajaur Agency, Pakistan

- Part of the Insurgency in Khyber Pakhtunkhwa and the war on terror
- Operational scope: Massacre in the Chenagai village of the Bajaur Agency
- Type: airstrike
- Location: Chenagai village, Bajaur, KPK, Pakistan
- Commanded by: Unknown (Pakistan or United States)
- Target: Deputy al-Qaeda leader Ayman al-Zawahiri
- Objective: Target militant hideouts in Northwest Pakistan
- Date: 30 October 2006
- Executed by: Disputed/Unknown: Pakistan Air Force or United States Air Force
- Outcome: Unknown
- Casualties: 70–82 (per local sources) killed Unknown injured

The Chenagai airstrike took place on October 30, 2006, around 5:00 am local time in the Chenagai village of Bajaur Agency (today Bajaur District) of the Federally Administered Tribal Areas (FATA, today Khyber Pakhtunkhwa Province, KPK) on Pakistan's western border with Afghanistan. Both Pakistan and the United States were accused of conducting the attack, however the United States officially denied responsibility for the attack.

Security and terrorism commentator Alexis Debat reported the target of the strike was Ayman al-Zawahiri, al-Qaeda's second-in-command. Though Zawahiri was not among the dead and was killed in a July 2022 airstrike in Kabul, two to five senior al-Qaeda commanders were present, during or shortly before the attack including Matiur Rehman Ali Muhammad, mastermind of the 2006 transatlantic aircraft plot, and Faqir Mohammad, a close friend of Zawahiri and deputy leader of Tehrik-e Taliban Pakistan (TTP).

No official count of casualties was undertaken, local sources claim between 70 and 82 were killed in the attack.

== Strike ==
The attack took place in Chenagai village near the town of Khar, the headquarters of Bajaur Agency. The leader of the madrassa, cleric Maulana Liaqat Ullah Hussain, was suspected to be sheltering al-Qaeda militants and was among the dead.

=== Responsibility ===
According to ABC News, the attack was launched by a MQ-1 Predator with Ayman al-Zawahiri as its intended target. However, the report's author has since been removed from ABC's site due to questions concerning the reliability of his reporting.

Pakistani officials have said that the strike was conducted by the U.S. and that they have also requested the U.S. not to violate their sovereignty again. In an article immediately after the strike, Bill Roggio of the Long War Journal, concluded the strike was indeed carried out by U.S. as Pakistan does not possess capabilities to conduct precision night strikes.

== Reaction ==
There were angry reactions in response to the strike. Many Muslim groups have condemned the action. Siraj-ul-Haq, the senior Minister and Provincial Chief of the Jamaat-e-Islami party, resigned from the provincial cabinet in protest against the strikes. Sahibzada Haroonur Rashid, MNA (Member of National Assembly) from Bajaur Agency, also resigned from the National Assembly in protest.

== Retaliation ==
On November 8, 2006, a suicide bomber killed 42 Pakistani soldiers and injured 20 others in Dargai, Khyber-Pakhtunkhwa. The bombing was named the deadliest attack by the militants on the Pakistani armed forces since it began operations against pro-Taliban and al-Qaeda forces. Though no claims of responsibility were issued, the attack has been linked to the militants in Bajaur.

== See also ==
- Damadola airstrike
- Gora Prai airstrike
- Drone attacks in Pakistan
- List of drone strikes in Pakistan
