= Damadola =

Coordinates: 34°48′N 71°28′E

Damadola is a village in the Bajaur District of the Khyber Pakhtunkhwa in Pakistan, about 7 km (4.3 mi) from the Afghanistan border, it is located at 34° 48' 20N 71° 28' 0E at an altitude of 1082 metres (3553 feet). The village gained international attention in early 2006 after the U.S. launched an airstrike on Damadola killing at least 18 people. It was captured by Frontier Corps from the Taliban by February 6, 2010.

== See also ==
- Khosrow Sofla
- Tarok Kolache
