= Kalosha =

Pakistani village near the Afghan border

Kalosha is a village in South Waziristan, Pakistan, near the border with Afghanistan. It was the location of a missile attack that killed 12 people on 28 February 2008.
