= Azam Warsak =

Azam Warsak اعظم ورسک
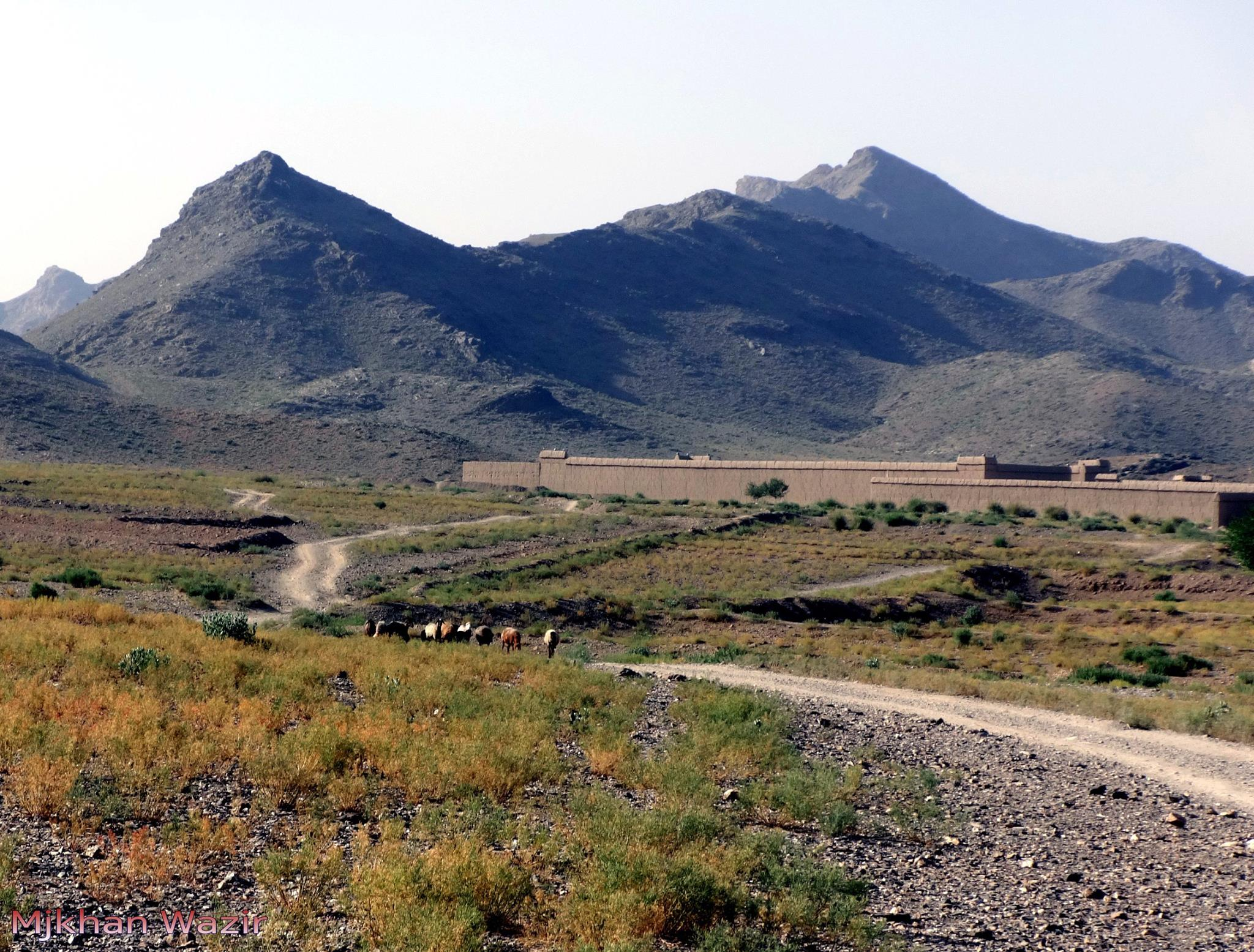
- Dramatic scenery of Azam Warsak

- Location within Khyber Pakhtunkhwa Location within Pakistan
- Coordinates: 32°17′15.8″N 69°24′49.5″E
- Country: Pakistan
- Province: Khyber Pakhtunkhwa
- District: South Waziristan
- Tehsil: Birmal Tehsil
- Elevation: 1,387 m (4,551 ft)
- Time zone: UTC+5 (PST)

Azam Warsak is a village located in Birmil Tehsil in the Lower South Waziristan District of Khyber Pakhtunkhwa province, Pakistan. It is located approximately 20 kilometres west of the town of Wanna. The village lies in area that is prone to cold weather in the winter.

Latitude:	32° 17' 15" N
Longitude:	69° 24' 49" E
Lat/Long (dec):	32.28772,69.41375

== Militancy ==
- In July 2008, a missile strike killed at least six people near the village.
- In August 2011 a drone strike attacked two vehicles killing at least 4 alleged militants
- In January 2013 senior Taliban Commander Maulvi Nazir was buried in Azam Warsak after being killed in a drone strike, reportedly 10,000 people attended his funeral.
- In December 2022, militants suspected to be the Pakistani Taliban, attacked a girls' school - killing one person and wounding another.
- In November 2024 militants attacked a government high school and detonated explosives after locking two members of staff inside the building.
- In August 2025 militants destroyed a school and a bridge in two separate attacks on the same day.
- In October 2025 Maulana Sakhi Wazir, a local JUI-F leader, narrow escaped being killed when an IED exploded in his mosque.

== See also ==
- Datakhel
- Kaniguram
- Jandola
