= Damadola airstrike =

- Part of Insurgency in Khyber Pakhtunkhwa
- Location: Damadola, Khyber Pakhtunkhwa, Pakistan
- Date: 13 January 2006
- Attack type: Drone strike
- Deaths: 18–25
- Perpetrator: Central Intelligence Agency

On 13 January 2006, the Central Intelligence Agency fired missiles into the Pakistani village of Damadola (Urdu: ڈمہ ڈولا) in the Bajaur (Urdu: باجوڑ ) tribal area, near the Afghan border, in an apparent anti-al-Qaeda operation, killing at least 18 people. United States officials later admitted that no al-Qaeda leaders perished in the strike and that only local villagers were killed. The attack purportedly targeted Ayman al-Zawahiri, second-in-command of al-Qaeda after Osama bin Laden, who was thought to be in the village.

== Airstrike ==
The attack was carried out by four CIA-operated unmanned Predator drones which launched four Hellfire missiles at a mud-walled compound, destroying three houses several hundred yards apart. Another report said that as many as 10 missiles were fired. The official number of dead is 18, including eight men, five women and five children, but other reports indicate that as many as 25 people were killed. Fourteen of the dead were said to be from the same family. There is confusion over the actual number killed, since reports claims that 13–15 of the dead were buried immediately. Some sources say this was "according to Islamic custom", others say they were buried "without customary funeral arrangements".

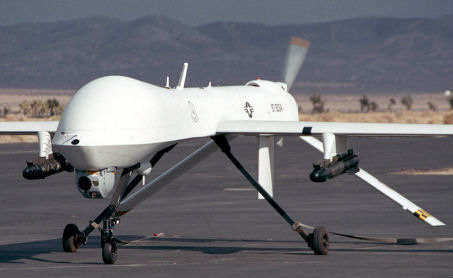
MQ-1L Predator UAV armed with AGM-114 Hellfire missiles

The Associated Press (AP) reported that unnamed Pakistani intelligence officials asserted that the attack was conducted based on intelligence that al-Zawahiri was invited to a dinner to mark the Islamic holiday of Eid al-Adha at the compound that was targeted. In the days after the attack, it was reported that several foreign members of al-Qaeda were among the dead. The provincial government of Bajaur, where the attack took place, stated that "four or five foreign terrorists" were killed in the attack, and that "10 or 12" extremists had attended in all. ABC reported that al-Qaeda bomb maker and chemical weapons expert Midhat Mursi was killed in the strike. According to Pakistani officials, Khalid Habib, the al-Qaeda operations chief for Pakistan and Afghanistan, and Abdul Rehman al Magrabi, a senior operations commander for al-Qaeda, were also killed. It was reported that the al-Qaeda members were attending a "terror summit" called to funnel new money into attacks against US forces in Afghanistan. United States and Pakistani officials later admitted that none of those al-Qaeda members perished in the strike and that only local villagers were killed. Midhat Mursi and Khalib Habib were killed in two other missile strikes in 2008.

Two Pakistani intelligence officials said Libyan-born Abu Faraj al-Libbi, who was captured in Pakistan in May 2005, told interrogators that he had met al-Zawahiri last year at the home of Bakhtpur Khan, one of the thirteen villagers killed in the airstrike. After that confession, US and Pakistani intelligence agents, with the help of local tribesmen and Afghans, monitored Bakhtpur Khan's home.

== Responses ==
Pakistan's Foreign Ministry issued a statement saying it protested to US Ambassador Ryan Crocker over the "loss of innocent civilian lives." The Pakistani government angrily denounced the attack. Pakistan's Information Minister Sheikh Rashid Ahmed called the attack "highly condemnable" and said the government wanted "to assure the people we will not allow such incidents to recur." Tension remained high throughout tribal areas. Angry Pakistanis protested against the strike, claiming it was illegal, and that the attack had killed innocent civilians. Thousands of tribesmen staged protests and a mob set fire to the office of Associated Development Construction, an ostensibly non-governmental organisation funded by the US Agency for International Development, in a sign of increasing frustration over a recent series of suspected US attacks along Pakistan's frontier with Afghanistan. On Sunday 15 January, tens of thousands of Pakistanis took part in anti-US protests across the country. The largest demonstration was held in the city of Karachi where protesters chanted "Death to America" and "Stop bombing innocent people". Hundreds of riot police were deployed to control the crowds. A leader in the coalition of Islamic groups that organised the nationwide protests demanded that General Musharraf step down.

Also on 15 January, US politicians expressed regret over the deaths caused by the attack but said the airstrike was justified. "It's terrible when innocent people are killed; we regret that," said US Senator John McCain. "We apologize, but I can't tell you that we wouldn't do the same thing again. We have to do what we think is necessary to take out al-Qaeda, particularly the top operatives. This guy has been more visible than Osama bin Laden lately." Senator Evan Bayh blamed the Pakistani government for being unable to control the frontier, rhetorically asking "Now, it's a regrettable situation, but what else are we supposed to do? It's like the Wild, Wild West out there. The Pakistani border [with Afghanistan] is a real problem."

George W. Bush provided written legal authority to the CIA to hunt down and kill people designated as enemy combatant "high-value targets" without seeking further approval each time the agency is about to stage an operation. The CIA believes it possesses all the necessary approvals within its "counterterror" centre in Langley, Virginia to fire missiles anywhere in the world, including Pakistan, when a high-value al-Qaeda target is spotted. The agency doesn't require further clearance from the White House, local governments, or the CIA director to kill an al-Qaeda operative. The purpose of this expanded authority is to expedite rapid action in case a targeted killing opportunity is time-sensitive. On 30 January, a video showing al-Zawahri wearing white robes and a white turban, said the 13 January airstrike killed "innocents" and said the United States had ignored an offer from bin Laden for a truce.

== See also ==
- Chenagai airstrike
- Gora Prai airstrike
- Drone attacks in Pakistan
  - List of drone strikes in Pakistan
- Waziristan War
- 2009 Makin airstrike
