= Islamabad Marriott Hotel bombing =

Suicide bombing at the Marriott Hotel in Pakistan on 20 September 2008

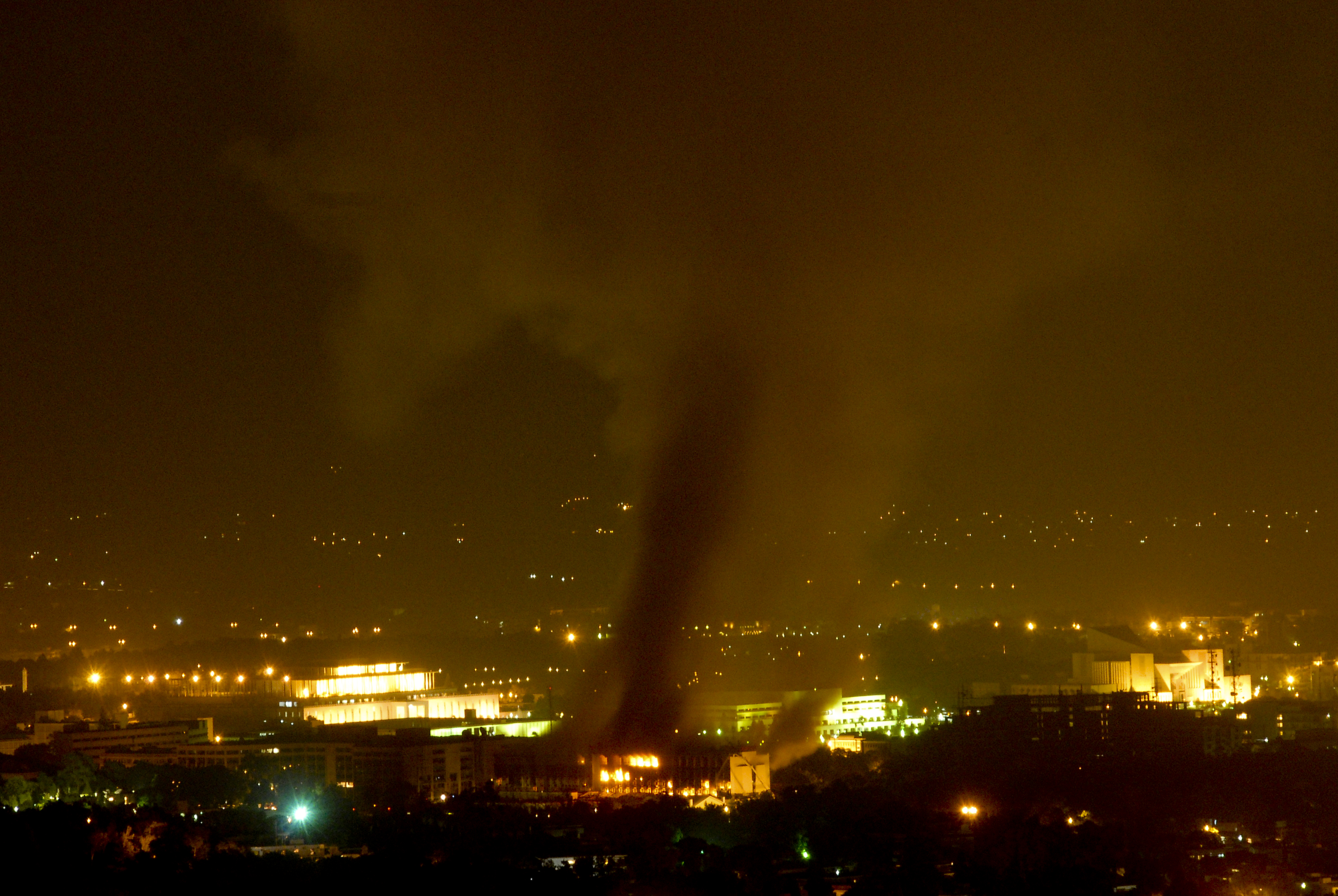
- View of the hotel after the attack
- Location: 33.7328°N 73.0871°E; Islamabad, Pakistan
- Date: 20 September 2008; 18 years ago 19:56. (UTC+05:00)
- Attack type: Suicide attack, truck bombing
- Weapon: Dump truck filled with IED
- Deaths: 55 (including one bomber)
- Injuries: 266
- Perpetrator: Unknown

The Islamabad Marriott Hotel bombing occurred on the night of 20 September 2008, when a dumper truck filled with explosives was detonated in front of the Marriott Hotel in the Pakistani capital Islamabad, killing at least 54 people, injuring at least 266 and leaving a 60 ft (18 m) wide, 20 ft (6.1 m) deep crater outside the hotel. The majority of the casualties were Pakistanis; at least five foreign nationals were also killed (including The Czech ambassador to Pakistan, Dr. Ivo Žďárek) and fifteen others reported injured. The attack occurred only hours after President Asif Ali Zardari made his first speech to the Pakistani parliament. The Marriott was the most prestigious hotel in the capital, and was located near government buildings, diplomatic missions, embassies and high commissions.

During the investigation, three suspected terrorists were arrested by the Pakistani police. They were suspected of having facilitated the suicide bomber. However, later they were acquitted of all charges as no evidence was ever presented against them.

Only a few months after the hotel's bombing, owner Sadruddin Hashwani had arranged a re-construction, and the Islamabad Marriott reopened officially on 28 December 2008. It is one of the worst terrorist attacks in the history of Pakistan.

== Attack ==
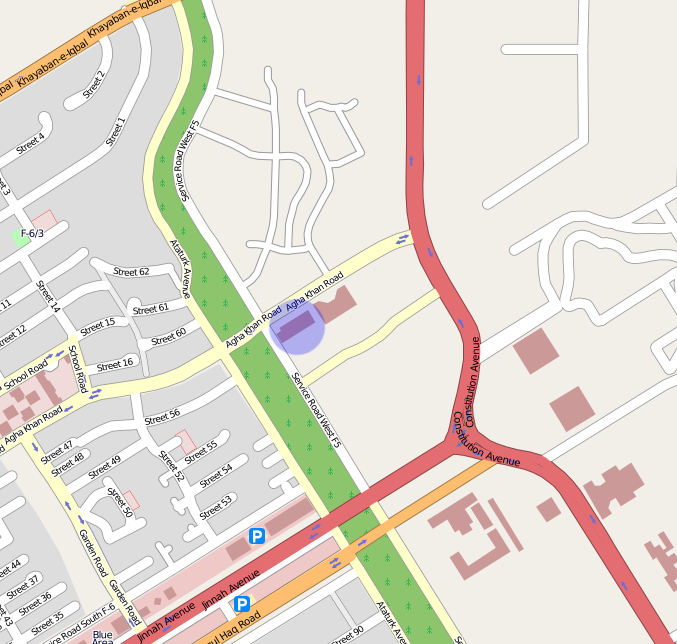
Map of the location of the hotel and its surroundings with the hotel highlighted in purple

The hotel blast caused a severe natural gas leak that set the top floor of the five-story, 258-room hotel on fire, police said. The explosion was heard 15 kilometres away. The blaze that followed quickly engulfed the entire structure of the Marriott hotel. About two-thirds of the building caught fire as a result of the explosion after a natural gas pipe was blown open, and the reception area was completely destroyed.

The owner of the Marriott Hotel, Hashoo Group, owned by Sadruddin Hashwani, said the truck carrying the bomb had been stopped at the front barrier. "Some shots were fired. One of our guards fired back, and in the meantime the suicide bomber detonated all the explosives. All the guards on the gate died", said Hashwani.

== Victims ==
Victims by nationality
Country	Deaths	Injured
Pakistan	46	245
United States	3	1
Germany	1	7
Denmark	1	3
Czech Republic	1	
Vietnam	1	
Egypt	1	
United Kingdom		4
Islamic Republic of Afghanistan		1
Lebanon		1
Libyan Arab Jamahiriya		1
Morocco		1
Philippines		1
Saudi Arabia		1
Total	54	266

Most of the dead were Pakistani citizens; several foreigners were also killed. Two American military personnel and a Danish intelligence agent were killed, and a U.S. State Department employee was missing and presumed dead. The Czech ambassador to Pakistan, Dr. Ivo Žďárek, also died in the ensuing fire along with his Vietnamese companion. Although Žďárek had survived the initial blast, he returned to the hotel to help in the rescue effort but was trapped in the burning building. An Egyptian citizen also died in the attack. In addition, six Germans, four Britons and a Filipina receptionist from the hotel were among the injured.

=== Meeting of the Pakistani leadership ===
Pakistan's top leaders were to have been in the Islamabad Marriott hotel when it was bombed; instead, having changed their plans at the last minute, they gathered for dinner at the Prime Minister's house, a few hundred yards from the explosion, following President Asif Ali Zardari's maiden address to a joint session of parliament. "The national assembly speaker had arranged a dinner for the entire leadership – for the president, prime minister and armed services chiefs – at the Marriott that day", the Interior ministry head, Rehman Malik, told reporters.

However, the hotel owner, Sadruddin Hashwani, denied that such a meeting had ever been scheduled to take place. According to a spokesman for Hashwani, "We didn't have any reservation for such a dinner that the government official is talking about."

Pakistani Interior Minister Rehman Malik said both Zardari and Prime Minister Yousaf Raza Gilani condemned the attack and vowed their determination to deal with terrorism, with Law Minister Farooq Naek stating "this is Pakistan's 9/11".

=== Explosives used ===
Government advisor Rehman Malik said RDX and TNT were used in the attack. Approximately 600 kg (1,300 lb) of RDX was mixed with TNT (Torpex or H6) and a mixture of mortar and ammunition to increase the explosive capacity. Aluminium powder was also mixed with the material to further enhance this capability. Torpex is about 50 percent more powerful than TNT by weight. The blast was heard for many miles throughout the capital.

"Delay switches" might also have been used. Guards were first alerted by a minor blast, which was followed by the much larger explosion about four minutes later.

=== Video of the attack ===
CCTV footage of a six-wheeled dumper truck as it enters the gates of the Marriott hotel.

The Pakistani government released the CCTV footage of the attack at a press conference saying that a six-wheeled dumper truck filled with explosives and an accelerant pulled up at the gate and first caught fire before exploding a few minutes later.

=== Hashwani claim ===
Sadruddin Hashwani, the owner of Islamabad Marriott Hotel, alleged that the Pakistani President at the time, Asif Ali Zardari might have been involved in the attack, citing his old rivalry with the President.

== American presence ==
An unnamed senior security official stated that about 30 U.S. Marines, scheduled to go to Afghanistan, were staying at the hotel, and they were believed to have been the targets of the bombing. This conflicted with information given by another unnamed official, who stated that the Marines were in Pakistan in connection with the visit by U.S. Chairman of the Joint Chiefs of Staff, Admiral Mike Mullen, who met the Pakistani Prime Minister Yousaf Raza Gillani and other government officials on Wednesday. The personnel were staying on the fourth floor of the hotel, which was also among the most severely damaged by the fire which ensued following the bomb blast. According to the Dawn, a number of the marines who stayed at the hotel sustained injuries; the newspaper also cited an unnamed law enforcement official stating "personnel of a U.S. security agency" were in all likelihood a target of the attack. There are also reports that more Americans were present at the hotel, as several senior CIA officers were visiting Islamabad at the time of the attack and were believed to be staying at the hotel, according to unnamed "well placed sources". A 29 May 2009 press release from NSA reads: CTM3 Matthew J. O'Bryant, USN, a Navy Cryptologist, was assigned to Navy Information Operations Command (NIOC) Maryland. CTM3 O'Bryant made the ultimate sacrifice on 20 September 2008 while performing a cryptologic mission in Pakistan. The hotel has a direct line of sight to the telecom system in Islamabad Pakistan. The other American service member killed was Major Rodolfo Ivan Rodriguez, USAF. Major Rodriguez was doing work for the US Embassy and staying at the Marriott at the time of the attack.

=== Claims of American marines breaching security ===
An MP for the ruling Pakistan Peoples Party, Syed Mumtaz Alam Gillani, has come forward with testimony evidencing a purportedly serious security breach at the Marriott on the night between 16 and 17 September, several days before the bombing. Alam Gillani and two friends are said to have witnessed several large steel boxes being unloaded from a U.S. Embassy truck by a group of U.S. Marines and, according to someone at the hotel, transported to the fourth and fifth floors. Among the several people who witnessed this incident was Pakistan Peoples Party leader Sajjad Chaudhry.

However, Alam Gilani was the only one who objected to and protested the apparent security breach taking place, but was met with silence from the American Marines. The hotel security staff did not respond to Alam Gilani's protests as they passively watched what was taking place, not being allowed to go near the boxes by the U.S. Marines. Alam Gilani has since denounced the newspaper account, asserting that he was merely making light conversation with the journalist; the newspaper, however, stands by its account. Pakistani authorities are also investigating this issue.

The American Embassy has said that it routinely rents rooms at the Marriott. Confronted with the activities of the U.S. Marines on the night of 16/17 September, embassy spokesperson Lou Fintor stated: "A team of support personnel often and routinely precede and/or accompany certain U.S. government officials. They often carry communication and office equipment required to support large delegations, such as high-level administration officials and members of the U.S. Congress." However, the incident occurred after Admiral Mullen's departure.

== Consequences ==
Graham Usher reports on the bombing for Canada's Talk Nation Radio
On 22 September 2008, Graham Usher discussed the Marriott bombing and other news from the region.

President Asif Ali Zardari was considering delaying his visit to the US to attend the UN General Assembly session in the wake of the bombing. MP Ayaz Amir said that he felt that the president should cancel his visit given the circumstances, and instead should combat terrorism and extremism. He added, "I believe that the UN General Assembly annual session is the most useless event in the world where leaders go to listen to their own speeches." However, Zardari did make it to New York for the opening of the new session of the General Assembly.

Due to the attack, British Airways suspended flights to Islamabad as a precautionary measure "until further notice." British Airways did not resume flights until June 2019 a decade later. American schools and universities in Islamabad closed for the rest of that week as well.

=== Terror pledge ===
The BBC reported that Pakistan was an important ally of the United States in its "war on terror", but that it had disagreements over tactics and had complained about US raids from Afghanistan. Following an apparent power vacuum as a result of the stepping down of former president Pervez Musharraf earlier in the month, U.S. missile-strikes had increased, culminating in the Baghar Cheena airstrike on 17 September. After the event, president Asif Ali Zardari appealed for "all democratic forces" to help to save Pakistan and he pledged to rid Pakistan of Islamic militants: "Terrorism is a cancer in Pakistan, we are determined, God willing, we will rid the country of this cancer. I promise you that such actions by these cowards will not lower our resolve." Pakistan's chief adviser on internal security, Rehman Malik, said "the authorities would fight on until the last terrorist is cleared. We think that the safe Pakistan, safe Afghanistan is safety for the world and therefore we will not let them have easy way."

=== Possible perpetrators ===
A Taliban spokesperson denied the group's involvement in the blast, saying they "do not believe in killing so many locals."

An American intelligence official stated that the attack "bears all the hallmarks of a terrorist operation carried out by Al Qaeda or its associates."

Some investigators suspect another Islamist group, Harkat-ul-Jihad-al-Islami, was responsible for the attack, based upon the similarities between this incident and four previous attacks allegedly conducted by its operatives.

Dubai-based Arabiya Television says a group calling itself Fedayeen Islam (also spelled Fedayan-i-Islam), variously translated as "Islamic Commandos" or "Islamic Patriots" has called Arabiya's correspondent in the Pakistani capital, Islamabad. The correspondent said he received a text message on his mobile phone, showing a telephone number. He said he called the number and then heard a recording in which the group admitted launching Saturday's attack. The Arabiya television correspondent says the speaker spoke in English language with a South Asian accent. The Fedayeen Islam group has issued several demands including for Pakistan to stop its cooperation with the United States.

=== U.S. airstrike ===
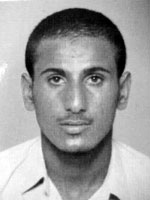
Fahid Mohammed Ally Msalam, one of the suspects who were involved in the hotel attacks

On 1 January 2009 a missile fired from an unmanned aerial vehicle killed al-Qaeda's chief of operations for Pakistan, Fahid Mohammed Ally Msalam, and his aide, Sheikh Ahmed Salim Swedan. U.S. officials stated that they believed that al-Kini masterminded the hotel bombing.

=== Legal Issues ===
Represented by Miami-based attorney Andrew C. Hall and a Maryland attorney, Jonathan A. Azrael, the family of an American killed in the blast sued Marriott for negligence in federal court in Maryland in 2011.

== Fund ==
The "Islamabad Marriott Assistance Fund" was started by the owner of the hotel as the blast and resulting fires killed about 40 hotel staff, including the security guards who had tried to avert the disaster, while scores of other employees were also wounded.

Sadruddin Hashwani said: "We have set up a fund to cater for the future expenses of the families of employees either killed or wounded in the attack." He announced that he would make an initial donation of US$126,000 to the fund, and appealed for people to donate generously.

The Marriott International and The J. Willard and Alice S. Marriott Foundation also made contributions to the fund, established through United Way to provide financial assistance to the associates and their families affected by the tragedy.

== Investigation ==
A panel that the government had formed, consisting of police officials and experts from security agencies to probe the attack, presented a preliminary report to the Prime Minister. The Interior Secretary Syed Kamal Shah also admitted to the Senate's Standing Committee on his ministry that the blast was the result of a defective security system. He added that the Islamabad police chief has said intelligence agencies had informed the police about an explosives-laden vehicle entering the city to carry out an attack.

Three suspected terrorists Mohammed Aqeel (possibly Dr. Usman), Rana Ilyas and Hameed Afzal were arrested in Peshawar on 17 October by the Pakistani police with connection to the attack were remanded to police custody for 7 days on 18 October for questioning by an anti-terrorism court. They were suspected of having facilitated the suicide bomber. In requesting the court for a 10-day remand, the police also said they hoped to arrest more suspects with information from the three. Judge Sakhi Muhammad Kahut, who remanded the trio to police custody, also ordered police to produce them in court again on 24 October.

A man by the name of Dr. Usman, possibly the same individual, was involved in the attack on the Sri Lanka national cricket team and the raid against the Pakistani Army Headquarters.

Police said that Qari Ishtiaq, who is said to be the commander of Punjabi Taliban, was arrested from Bahawalpur on the information provided by the Hijratullah who has been jailed for 10 years due to his role in Lahore police academy attacks. Seven other militants were arrested from different parts of Punjab regions. Four hundred kilograms (880 pounds) of explosives were also seized from Qari Ishtiaq.

On 5 May 2010, Mohammed Aqeel, Rana Ilyas, Muhammad Hamid Afzal and Tahseen Ullah were acquitted of all charges as no evidence was ever presented against them.

== International reactions ==
=== Intergovernmental organizations ===
Country	Response
European Union	President of the European Council and French President Nicolas Sarkozy said that the European Union will "more than ever stand side by side" with Pakistan's fight against terrorism. High Representative for the Common Foreign and Security Policy, Javier Solana said that he condemns in the "strongest possible terms the despicable bomb attack." And that "I wish to convey my sincere condolences to the families of the victims and to the Pakistani government. My thoughts are also with those who were injured, to whom I wish a prompt recovery."
NATO	General Secretary Jaap de Hoop Scheffer said: "I condemn in the strongest possible terms the terrorist bombing of the Marriott Hotel in Islamabad. This grotesque attack, which has caused huge loss of life and great suffering, has no justification whatsoever." He added that "NATO remains committed to working with Pakistan, including the new government, to combat the shared threat of violent extremism."
Organization of the Islamic Conference	Ekmeleddin Ihsanoglu, the secretary-general of the Organisation of the Islamic Conference described the attacks as "despicable terrorist actions completely contradict the praiseworthy precepts of Islam." and called the perpetrators "the enemies of peace whom the international community must fight with all possible means."
United Nations	A statement issued by U.N. Secretary General Ban Ki-moon described the bombing as a "heinous" terrorist attack. He expressed his "heartfelt condolences to the families of the victims of this appalling attack, as well as to the government and people of Pakistan. No cause can justify the indiscriminate targeting of civilians." The United Nations Security Council held a formal 5-minute meeting to condemn the attack and underline "the need to bring the perpetrators, organizers, financiers and sponsors of this reprehensible act of terrorism to justice".

=== State entities ===
Country	Response
Afghanistan	President Hamid Karzai in a statement called for an "honest struggle" to beat terrorism. Adding that "As long as this evil phenomenon is active in the region, terror, horror and explosions will continue."
Australia	Prime Minister Kevin Rudd said that he was hoping to hold prompt discussions with the Pakistani government about its response to the truck bomb attack and labelled it as a "barbaric attack on innocent civilians".
Bangladesh	Foreign adviser Dr. Iftekhar Ahmed Chowdhury condemned the bomb blasts terming the attack a cowardly act of terrorism and describing the act as "heinous." He added "such [an] attack will bring no benefit for the perpetrators. The people of Bangladesh stand by the people and the government of Pakistan at this hour.".
Canada	Canada condemned the bombing of the Marriott Hotel in Islamabad which killed at least 60 people and offered its support for the Pakistani government. Canada "condemns the bomb attack ... and the appalling loss of life and injuries it has caused to so many innocent people", read a statement by Prime Minister Stephen Harper. "The use of violence and terror against innocent civilians must never be tolerated and we condemn those who have perpetrated this terrible act...[Canada] continues to stand beside the government and people of Pakistan in their fight against extremism and terror." Harper said there were no known Canadian casualties, but that authorities are monitoring the situation. "The government and people of Canada extend their deepest sympathies to the families of the dead and injured", the statement read. Liberal party leader Stéphane Dion issued a statement saying "I strongly condemn the terrorist bombing...No cause can justify this kind of brutal attack on innocent civilians. Those who show such disrespect for human life, demonstrate only their own cowardice. The world will not tolerate this kind of assault on the people of Pakistan...My Liberal colleagues and I extend our deepest sympathies to the family and friends of those who have been killed, and wish those who have been injured a speedy recovery."
China	People's Republic of China's Foreign Ministry spokeswoman Jiang Yu stated: "China opposes terrorism of any kind. As the friendly neighbor and all-weather friend of Pakistan, China will continue to support the unremitting efforts of Pakistan's government and people to maintain stability." China condemned the terrorist attack and expressed condolences and extended sympathies to the victims and bereaved families.
Czech Republic	The Czech minister of foreign affairs, Karel Schwarzenberg, informed the family of the Czech ambassador about his death. He sharply condemned the attack and expressed condolences to the victims' families. He said the attack was an attempt to destabilise the situation in Pakistan after the recent presidential elections. He also welcomed the Pakistani government's assurance that the attack won't weaken its resolve to fight the terrorists. Prime minister Mirek Topolánek has also talked to the envoy's family to express his sorrow. In his public statement, he said that "the Czech Republic sharply condemns any kind of terrorist activities." Topolánek added that Pakistan could be heading in the direction of a state like Iran or North Korea. As it owns nuclear weapons, a victory of fundamentalism in the country could destabilise the whole region and affect countries as remote as the Czech Republic. In his letter to the widow and her two sons, president Václav Klaus communicated his sorrow caused by the act and said that the diplomat seemed to be the right man in the right place.
Denmark	The Danish Foreign Minister Per Stig Møller says that he understands Pakistanis who compare this attack with the September 11 attacks. He stated that "The terrorists want to install a fanatical Islamic regime. However, Pakistan has nuclear arms and therefore this must not happen".
Egypt	Egyptian Foreign Minister Ahmed Aboul Gheit expressed Egypt's deepest condolences to the victims' families and wished the wounded a speedy recovery. Ahmed Aboul Gheit said Egypt supports Pakistan in face of violence and terror.
France	See European Union.
Germany	Chancellor Angela Merkel condemned the "brutal, inhumane" bombing, saying "The fight against transnational terrorism remains a top priority for affected countries like Pakistan and the international community. Germany will be continuing to support its partner Pakistan in efforts for stability and prosperity." Foreign Minister Frank-Walter Steinmeier sent a condolence message to the Pakistani Foreign Ministry saying that everything must be done to "discourage support for the terrorists."
India	Prime Minister Manmohan Singh, in a letter to Yousuf Raza Gilani, said: "Such attacks are a grim reminder of the challenges we face from destructive forces which have pitted themselves against the values of democracy and pluralism and the voices of moderation. We strongly condemn this act of terrorism. They threaten the peace, stability and development of each of us individually and all of us collectively. We must not allow such forces to succeed. They must be dealt with and brought to justice." Indian Foreign Minister Pranab Mukherjee said, "India condemns [sic] such acts of destruction and terrorism in any country of the world."
Indonesia	Government spokesman Dino Patti Djalal said that he hoped that the Pakistani government could reveal the case and bring the perpetrators to justice. Adding that "The Indonesian government strongly condemns the bombings in Marriot Hotel in Pakistan. We express a deep condolences to the victims, including Pakistanis and foreign citizens." The Indonesian Islamic Propagation Institute (LDII) Chairman Prasetyo Sunaryo chimed in, saying: "Not only non-Muslims but also Muslims in the country fell victim to the bomb attack. This is fasting month. The perpetrators of the bomb attack must respect it and refrain from committing a crime that claims the lives of other people. The bomb attack is certainly not the act of a Muslim. We, Muslims, must always keep watch for any attempt by foreign parties who try to disrupt harmony among adherents of different faiths. That is why we call on religious adherents in Indonesia to be united so we cannot easily be pitted one against the other."
Iran	According to the Iranian ministry of foreign affairs, the extent of the grief inflicted upon the people of Pakistan has gravely saddened the Iranian nation. "Such despicable acts that lead to the death of innocent people destabilize Pakistan. We strongly believe a secure and stable Pakistan would benefit all regional countries."
Italy	Foreign Minister Franco Frattini "firmly condemned" the attack saying it underlined the need to "reinforce international collaboration, in particular with the countries of the region" to "wipe out terrorism."
Jordan	King Abdullah II condemned the terrorist act in Pakistan and expressed solidarity with families of the victims.
Japan	The Foreign Ministry issued a statement saying, "We express sympathy for the victims and send condolences to their bereaved families. We also pray for the early recovery of injured. The government of Japan firmly condemns these bombings as inexcusable acts. We pay our respect to and have supported the government of Pakistan which has tackled with war on terror while making enormous sacrifices. We are resolved to continue our support to President Asif Ali Zardari and the government of Pakistan that declared their strong determination not to give way to this act of terrorism."
Kenya	Vice President Kalonzo Musyoka said, "Clearly, the attacks were not meant for the Kenyan embassy and our citizens are out of danger." He also sent messages of condolences to the people of the country on behalf of his government. The attack that left the Kenyan embassy in Islamabad damaged. The Permanent Secretary in the Foreign Affairs ministry Mwangi Thuita confirmed the incidence. The blast only shattered windows and doors of the embassy.
Malaysia	Foreign Minister Rais Yatim stated his government was deeply shocked and saddened that the bombing was deliberately directed at a civilian target designed to inflict maximum human casualties. He added, "That this senseless act of violence was committed during the holy month of Ramadan has made it all the more reprehensible. It is our hope that the perpetrators of this heinous and despicable crime be brought to justice."
New Zealand	Prime Minister of New Zealand Helen Clark said "New Zealand offers its sympathy to the people and government of Pakistan at this sad time. I know this is also a very worrying time for members of the Pakistani community in New Zealand, who fear for their loved ones, friends, and communities at home. New Zealand condemns such acts of terrorism without reservation. They are horrific and cowardly acts causing death and misery to innocent people. New Zealand and Pakistan have a longstanding relationship, through the Commonwealth. We welcomed the restoration of democracy in Pakistan, and its return as a full participant in the Commonwealth family. We recognize, however, that Pakistan has difficult challenges ahead of it. Its problems with internal terrorism, and the insecurity and instability in the border area with Afghanistan, are key concerns for Pakistan and the wider international community."
Norway	In a press release the Norwegian Foreign Ministry states: "The government has expressed our empathy towards Pakistani authorities over the loss of so many human lives, and we have asked that this be relayed to the bereaved." The Foreign Minister Jonas Gahr Støre states: "The government condemns the terror attack outside the Marriott Hotel today. There is no excuse for killing innocent civilians and I can do nothing except express my disgust towards those who are behind this act. This is a difficult situation for Pakistan. It is now important to add support to the democratic developments which have been taking place recently.".
Philippines	Press Secretary Jesus Dureza had condemned the bombings and pledges support to Pakistan despite calls to review its policy of being in the Global War against terrorism As such, the Philippine National Police has heightened security on hotels and other high-risk targets in the Philippines.
Qatar	The Foreign Ministry, in a statement, called it "a terrorist act that contravenes ethical and human values", and expressed "Qatar's condolences to the government and friendly people of Pakistan and families of the victims and the injured."
Russia	President Dmitry Medvedev stated: "Resolutely condemning this inhuman act we convey sincere solidarity and support to the people and leaders of Pakistan. I am convinced that the perpetrators of this barbaric act will be found and duly punished. We reaffirm our readiness to deepen interaction with Pakistan in a bilateral format and in the framework of international efforts to deal with the threat of terrorism."
Spain	Prime Minister José Luis Rodríguez Zapatero extended his "deepest condolences to the families of the victims of this bloody attack", and expressed his solidarity "in these difficult moments" with the Pakistani people and their government.
South Korea	South Korea condemned the bombing in a statement saying that the attack was "an act against humanity that cannot be tolerated under any cause."
Slovakia	Press department of the Ministry of Foreign Affairs issued a statement saying: "Slovakia's Foreign Affairs Ministry re-confirms its support for the Pakistani Government in its efforts to introduce democracy and development, and in its fight against terrorism and Islamic fundamentalism striving to destabilise the country".
Saudi Arabia	Saudi Ambassador to Pakistan Ali Bin-Awad Asiri said: "We support Pakistan in its ordeal and we condemn this criminal act and denounce its perpetrators. We wonder how a Muslim person would carry out a criminal act in this holy month in this cruel manner."
Sri Lanka	Ministry of Foreign Affairs issued a statement saying "Sri Lanka fully supports all comprehensive measures being taken by the government of Pakistan to combat the menace of terrorism. The 'people and the government of Sri Lanka are extremely saddened' and 'share the grief of the Pakistan nation in this hour of acute pain'."
Syria	President of Syria Bashar al-Assad condemned the attack in a telegram he sent to Pakistani president Asif Ali Zardari. Assad expressed his deep grief and offered his condolences to Zardari, the friendly people of Pakistan and the families of the victims. He also wished the injured a speedy recovery.
Turkey	President Abdullah Gül said "I strongly condemn this appalling attack which aimed at spoiling domestic peace. I believe that those who waged this attack will be defeated by the national unity and communal compromise". Prime Minister Recep Tayyip Erdoğan said "On behalf of the Turkish people who have suffered great losses for many years due to terror attacks and my Government, I strongly condemn this abhorrent attack which targets Pakistan's stability and its persistently developing democracy".
United Arab Emirates	The foreign ministry said "The UAE strongly condemns this heinous crime, committed by terrorists this evening in Islamabad and led to losses in lives and properties."
United Kingdom	Prime Minister Gordon Brown condemned the suicide bombing in Islamabad and pledged that Britain would do whatever it could to help Pakistan combat terrorism. Foreign Secretary David Miliband said that "This latest bombing attack in Islamabad is yet another shocking and disgraceful attack without justification."
United States of America	15 FBI agents have been offered to help in the investigation into the bombing; deployment pending approval of the Pakistani government. United States National Security Council spokesman Gordon Johndroe said that the country "strongly condemns the terrorist attack[...] [and we] will stand with Pakistan's democratically elected government as they confront this challenge." In the same vein, President George W. Bush said "This attack is a reminder of the ongoing threat faced by Pakistan, the United States, and all those who stand against violent extremism", and that this attack "is part of a continuing assault on the people of Pakistan." Adding that he promised to "assist Pakistan in confronting this threat and bringing the perpetrators to justice", as well as to support the people of Pakistan "as they face enormous challenges economically as well as from terrorism." The two major presidential candidates also gave statements: Republican John McCain pointed to "violent Islamic extremism" and Democrat Barack Obama said the attack "demonstrates the grave and urgent threat that al-Qaida and its affiliates pose to the United States, to Pakistan, and to the security of all nations."
Vietnam	Ministry of Foreign Affairs spokesman Le Dung strongly condemned the terrorist attack and expressed deep condolences to the state, government and people of Pakistan, as well as the families of victims, especially relatives of Vietnamese national Nguyen Hong Ngoc.
Yemen	The Foreign Ministry said that Yemen condemns seriously this terrorist attack, and that this acts as a confirmation that the terrorist network still forms a critical evil threat to security and stability of a number of world countries. The matter requires a boost to security and intelligence cooperation at the regional and international level to confront and end such criminal acts. It also expressed Yemen, its leadership, government and people's condolences to the Pakistani leadership, government and people, and for the victims' families; confirming Yemen's solidarity and its stand with Pakistani government in combating terrorism.

=== Other non-state entities ===
Organization	Response
Cricket Australia	Public affairs manager Peter Young said: "Our reaction is that it's terribly sad and tragic news. Australian cricket has got a lot of friends in Pakistan and I think everyone at the national level is really sorry to hear this sort of continuing news coming out of the place. We enjoy playing against them and we have tours coming up there next year of course. Everyone is praying quite fervently that the domestic situation there settles down so people can live their life in peace and hopefully we can start playing cricket there again." Australian Cricketers' Association president Darren Lehmann said that news of the bombing was shocking. "It's a tragedy over there, and it [would have been] a tragedy if our players and any of the world players were there", he said.
(United States) Marriott International	In a statement on his corporate blog, the CEO of the Marriott group International, Bill Marriott said that, "This senseless tragedy and the profound loss of life has left me greatly saddened. My heart goes out to those who've been injured and the families of the victims.... Currently, our associates who escaped serious injury are doing whatever they can to assist with rescue and recovery efforts. The actions of these associates in Islamabad and their desire and willingness to help in a time of such tremendous tragedy are a true testament to Marriott's culture." and that "We live in a dangerous world and this is a terrible tragedy. We grieve for those people who died, or were injured, and their families..." A statement from the hotel said, "The blast caused extensive damage to the front of the hotel and started a fire. Marriott International and the hotel are working with local authorities and rescue personnel to assist victims. News reports indicate numerous people were killed and injured in the bombing, including the deaths of several hotel security personnel who stopped the truck."
Pakistan Cricket Board	A senior official told Geo TV: "What happened at the Marriott hotel is a human tragedy and very sad. But I think it shows that Pakistan does face a security situation like many other countries." PCB Director (Media) Sohail added, "We have been saying all along that Pakistan is as safe as any other country as no country is safe from terrorist attacks. But we were prepared...Indeed we face a security situation like many other countries but we were permitted and prepared to provide fool-proof and guaranteed security..."

== See also ==
- List of terrorist incidents in 2008
- War in North-West Pakistan
- Pan Am Flight 73
