= Marriott bombing =

Marriott bombing may refer to:

- 2003 Marriott Hotel bombing in Jakarta, Indonesia
- 2008 Marriott Hotel bombing in Islamabad, Pakistan
- 2009 Jakarta bombings in Jakarta, Indonesia
