= Dayle Shackel =

New Zealand cricketer (born 1970)

Personal information
- Full name: Dayle Francis Shackel
- Born: 29 January 1970 (age 56); Christchurch, Canterbury, New Zealand
- Batting: Right-handed
- Role: Wicket-keeper

Domestic team information
- Years: Team
- 1993/94: Otago
- Source: CricInfo, 23 May 2016

Dayle Francis Shackel (born 29 January 1970) is a New Zealand former cricketer who has since worked as a physiotherapist and medical director for cricket teams. He played domestically for Otago.

Shackel was born at Christchurch in 1970 and educated at King's High School in Dunedin. A wicket-keeper, he played age-group cricket for Otago between 1986–87 and 1989–90 and for the Second XI in 1992–93 and 1993–94. His only senior representative appearance was a single List A match against Wellington in January 1994. Batting last in Otago's order, he faced one ball from which he did not score and took a single catch in the match.

Shackel later became the physiotherapist for the New Zealand national team, a role he kept until 2011, when he became the team's injury management and physiotherapy co-ordinator. In May 2002, Shackel was on tour in Pakistan with the New Zealand team when he was lightly wounded in the bomb blast which targeted the team's bus. in 2020, he began working as the medical manager for New Zealand Cricket.
