= Sri Lankan cricket team in Pakistan in 2008–09 =

	Sri Lanka	Pakistan
- Dates: 20 January – 5 March
Captains	Mahela Jayawardene	Shoaib Malik

Test series
- Result: 2-match series drawn 0–0
Most runs	Thilan Samaraweera 469	Younis Khan 313
Most wickets	Dilhara Fernando 2	Umar Gul 9

One Day International series
- Results: Sri Lanka won the 3-match series 2–1
Most runs	Tillakaratne Dilshan 255	Salman Butt 162
Most wickets	Muttiah Muralitharan 6	Umar Gul 10

The Sri Lankan cricket team was touring Pakistan in January and February 2009. The series was the first Test tour of Pakistan since South Africa visited in October 2007. The tour was arranged as a replacement for the scheduled tour of India which was cancelled by BCCI following 2008 Mumbai attacks. The tour included 3 ODIs and 2 Tests.

The safety of touring cricket teams in Pakistan had long been in issue. In May 2002, New Zealand abandoned their Test series in Pakistan after a suicide bomb attack outside their hotel. Australia had recently refused to tour on safety grounds. In order to persuade the Sri Lankan team to visit, the Pakistan government offered to arrange "presidential-style security." During the Second Test at Lahore, the Sri Lankan team were attacked by masked gunmen in a terror attack. Six members of the teams' security detail and two other civilians were killed. No cricketers were killed but five were listed as injured including Mahela Jayawardene, the Sri Lankan captain, and his deputy Kumar Sangakkara, Ajantha Mendis, Thilan Samaraweera and Tharanga Paranavitana.

This was the final tour of a visiting team in Pakistan until Zimbabwe toured in 2015.

== ODI series ==
=== 1st ODI ===
20 January 2009
Scorecard

Sri Lanka; 219 (45.2 overs)	v	Pakistan; 220/2 (45.5 overs)
Kumar Sangakkara 40 (70 balls); Iftikhar Anjum 4/42 (8.2 overs)		Salman Butt 100* (117 balls); Muttiah Muralitharan 1/42 (10 overs)

Pakistan won by 8 wickets
National Stadium, Karachi
Umpires: Nigel Llong (Eng) and Nadeem Ghauri (Pak)
Player of the match: Salman Butt (Pak)

=== 2nd ODI ===
21 January 2009
Scorecard

Sri Lanka; 290/8 (50 overs)	v	Pakistan; 161 (34.5 overs)
Tillakaratne Dilshan 76 (88 balls); Umar Gul 4/58 (9 overs)		Salman Butt 62 (87 balls); Muttiah Muralitharan 3/19 (7 overs)

Sri Lanka won by 129 runs
National Stadium, Karachi
Umpires: Asad Rauf (Pak) and Nigel Llong (Eng)
Player of the match: Tillakaratne Dilshan (SL)

=== 3rd ODI ===
24 January 2009
Scorecard

Sri Lanka; 309/5 (50 overs)	v	Pakistan; 75 (22.5 overs)
Tillakaratne Dilshan 137 (139); Umar Gul 3/45 (9 overs)		Umar Gul 27 (35); Nuwan Kulasekara 3/17 (7 overs)

Sri Lanka won by 234 runs
Gaddafi Stadium, Lahore
Umpires: Asad Rauf (Pak) and Nigel Llong (Eng)
Player of the match: Tillakaratne Dilshan (SL)

== Test series ==
=== 1st Test ===
21–25 February 2009
Scorecard

Sri Lanka	v	Pakistan
644/7 d (155.2 overs); Mahela Jayawardene 240 (424); Danish Kaneria 3/170 (46.2 overs)		765/6 d (248.5 overs); Younis Khan 313 (568); Dilhara Fernando 2/124 (39 overs)
144/5 (31 overs); Kumar Sangakkara 65 (66); Danish Kaneria 2/35 (9.0 overs)

Match drawn
National Stadium, Karachi
Umpires: Steve Davis (Aus) and Simon Taufel (Aus)
Player of the match: Younis Khan (Pak)

- For the first time in history, both captains hit innings of 200 or more in the same Test.
- This is only the second Test in history to see three batsmen hit double centuries. The other double century in the match was by Sri Lankan Thilan Samaraweera.
- Khurram Manzoor and Sohail Khan (Pak) and Tharanga Paranavitana (SL) made their Test debuts.

=== 2nd Test ===
1–5 March 2009
scorecard

Sri Lanka	v	Pakistan
606 (151 overs); Thilan Samaraweera 214 (338); Umar Gul 6/135 (37 overs)		110/1 (23.4 overs); Khurram Manzoor 59* (71); Ajantha Mendis 0/21 (8 overs)

Match drawn
Gaddafi Stadium, Lahore
Umpires: Steve Davis (Aus) and Simon Taufel (Aus)

- Match abandoned as a result of an attack on Sri Lankan cricket team in Lahore
- Mohammad Talha (Pak) made his Test debut.

== Only Tour Match:Pakistan Cricket Board Patron's XI vs Sri Lankans ==
17–18 February 2009
(scorecard)

Pakistan Cricket Board Patron's XI; 395/4 (90 overs)	v	Sri Lankans; 283/5 (90 overs)
Ahmed Shehzad 146(retired hurt) (174); Chaminda Vaas 1/27 (10 overs)		Kumar Sangakkara 100(retired not out) (176); Mohammad Khalil 1/10 (4 overs)

Pakistan Cricket Board Patron's XI won by 112 runs
Southend Club Cricket Stadium, Karachi
Umpires: Ehtesham-ul-Haq & Riazuddin (both PAK)

- Players per side: 14 (11 batting, 11 fielding)
- Maximum of 90 overs
