= 2002 Karachi bus bombing =

Terror attack in Karachi, Pakistan

Coordinates: 24°51′36″N 67°00′36″E

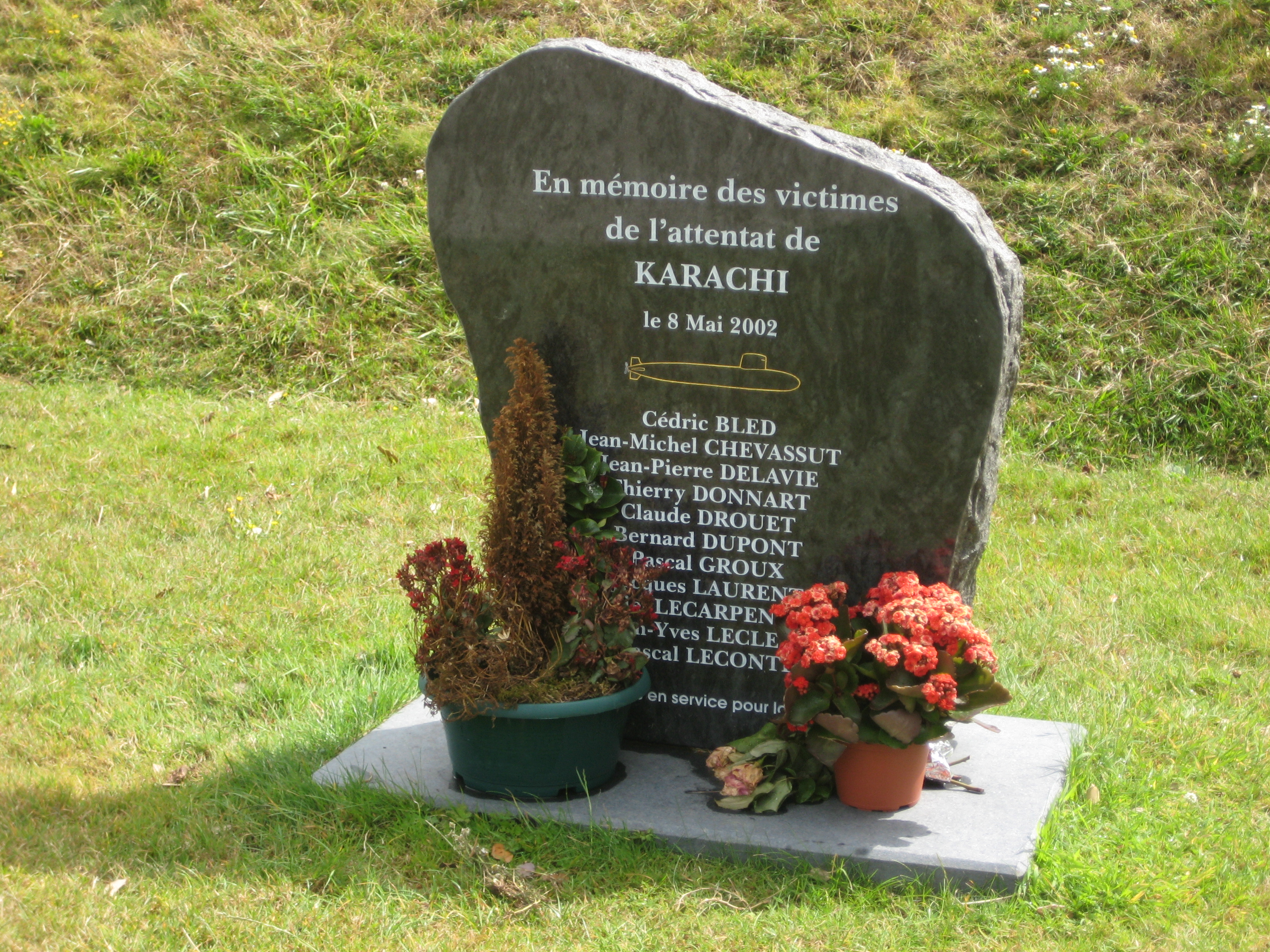
- Memorial to the French victims in Cherbourg, France
- Location: Karachi, Sindh, Pakistan
- Date: May 8, 2002
- Target: French people
- Attack type: Suicide car bomb
- Deaths: 14
- Injuries: 40

The 2002 Karachi bus bombing was a suicide car bomb attack that occurred in Karachi, Sindh, Pakistan in 2002. The blast was said to have targeted French nationals and killed 14 people, including 11 French engineers and 3 Pakistanis. Approximately 40 others were wounded.

== Details ==
On 8 May 2002, a man driving a car bomb pulled up next to a bus outside Sheraton Hotel in Karachi. He detonated the car, ripping the bus apart, and killing himself, 11 Frenchmen, and two Pakistanis. The Frenchmen were engineers working with Pakistan to design an Agosta 90B-class submarine for Pakistani Navy. About 40 others were wounded.

The bombing occurred close to the Pearl-Continental Hotel where the New Zealand national cricket team were staying during their tour of 2002. The team's physiotherapist Dayle Shackel received a minor cut to his forearm from flying glass. The team abandoned the tour immediately and returned to New Zealand on the first available flight.

Al-Qaeda was blamed for the blast. In 2003, two men Mohammad Sharib and Mufti Zubair were arrested and sentenced to life imprisonment for their role in the bombing by a Karachi court. The suspected bombmaker, Mufti Mohammad Sabir, was arrested in Karachi on 8 September 2005. There were several convictions in the case, though Pakistani courts acquitted three defendants by 2009.

== Karachigate ==
Contrary to official announcements by the Pakistani and the French governments at the time, it is now thought to be unlikely that those responsible for the attack had links to al-Qaeda. In 2007, anti-terrorism judge Jean-Louis Bruguière, assigned to lead the investigation into the bombing, was replaced by two investigating magistrates, Marc Trevidic and Renaud Van Ruymbeke. The former opened a new line in the investigation: that the attack was linked to the halting of kickback. The resulting scandal has been dubbed "Karachigate".

An investigation is currently underway in France to establish the extent to which former French Prime Minister Édouard Balladur and former French President Nicolas Sarkozy were implicated in the sale of kickbacks to Pakistani officials. Sarkozy was allegedly involved in accepting kickbacks from Pakistan to fund the presidential campaign of Balladur. When Jacques Chirac came to power, he cancelled the Pakistani officials' kickbacks, angering many people in Pakistan.

== See also ==
- Karachi affair
- 2009 attack on the Sri Lanka national cricket team
