= 2009 attack on the Sri Lanka national cricket team =

Attack on cricket team in Pakistan by terrorists

2009 attack on the Sri Lanka national cricket team in Pakistan
- Location: 31°30′38″N 74°20′25″E; Lahore, Pakistan
- Date: 3 March 2009; 08:40 PKT (UTC+5:00)
- Attack type: Ambush
- Weapons: AK-47s, 6–7 RPGs and 22–70 hand grenades
- Deaths: 6 Pakistani police officers 2 civilians Minivan driver
- Injuries: 6 Sri Lankan cricketers 2 staff 1 reserve umpire
- Perpetrator: Lashkar-e-Jhangvi (allegedly)
- No. of participants: 14–15
- Defender: Punjab Police/Elite Police

On 3 March 2009, a bus carrying Sri Lankan cricketers, part of a larger convoy, was fired upon by 12 gunmen near Gaddafi Stadium in Lahore, Pakistan. The cricketers were on their way to play the third day of the second Test against the Pakistani cricket team. Six members of the Sri Lanka national cricket team were wounded and six Pakistani policemen and two civilians were killed.

The attack was believed to have been carried out by the Lashkar-e-Jhangvi. In August 2016, three of the terrorists involved in the attack were killed during a police raid in Lahore. In October, the attack's mastermind was killed in eastern Afghanistan during a military operation, while hiding there.

== Background of the tour ==
The safety of touring cricket teams in Pakistan had long been an issue. In May 2002, New Zealand abandoned their Test series in Pakistan after a suicide bomb attack outside their hotel. However, they returned in the 2003/2004 season to fulfill their commitments. Australia had refused to tour in October 2002 on safety grounds. The Sri Lankan cricket team was in Pakistan as a replacement for the Indian team, who had pulled out after the terrorist attacks in Mumbai. In order to persuade the Sri Lankan team to visit, the Pakistan government offered to give them presidential-style security, which they failed to provide to the Sri Lankan team. The series was the first Test tour of Pakistan since South Africa visited in October 2007.

== Attack ==
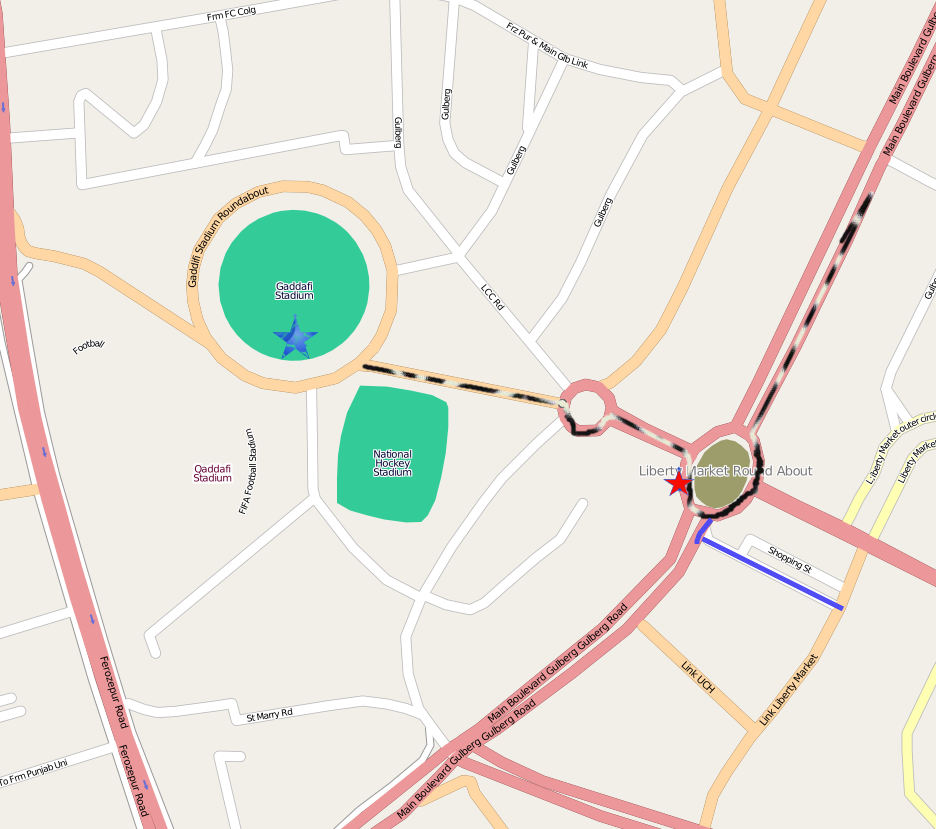
Black/grey depicts the route for team convoy. The escape route for attackers is shown in blue.

According to the officials, 12 gunmen were hiding near Liberty Square, in the centre of Lahore, waiting for the Sri Lankan team to pass on their way to the Gaddafi stadium. They started firing at the bus when it crossed the road. The Pakistan police escorting the team returned fire; in the ensuing fighting, six policemen and two civilians died. After about 20 minutes, the militants fled, leaving behind rocket launchers and grenades.

The gunmen first shot at the wheels of the bus, and then fired at the bus itself and its occupants. The attackers had fired a rocket at the bus, which missed and hit a nearby electric pole. The driver of the bus, Mehar Mohammad Khalil, had then kept on driving a distance of about 500 metres (1,600 ft) until they reached the stadium. Khalil was awarded Tamgha-i-Shujaat for his bravery. The attackers had also thrown a grenade under the bus, which exploded after the bus had passed over it.

A minivan following the team bus carrying the match referee and umpires was also fired upon and the driver was killed. Simon Taufel, Steve Davis, Nadeem Ghauri, Ahsan Raza, umpires performance manager Peter Manuel, liaison officer Abdul Sami and ICC match referee Chris Broad were in this minivan. The minivan was subsequently allegedly abandoned by security personnel and no bullets were fired by the security forces for twenty minutes. Chris Broad threw himself over and kept his hand on the chest of Ahsan Raza to slow down the profuse bleeding from a bullet injury. A police officer who climbed into the minivan to seek cover drove the minivan to safety.

Security cameras captured footage of several gunmen carrying automatic weapons and backpacks, firing on the convoy from the Liberty Square roundabout. They were later seen jogging up the street and escaping on motorcycles. The video was broadcast around the world presenting pictures of the attacks. CCTV footage has been made public. They arrived at 8:39 am local time and left at 8:46 am. The attackers were armed with AK-47 assault rifles, hand grenades, RPG launchers, claymores and explosive charges.

The Sri Lankan team were then taken to the stadium and airlifted from the pitch via Pakistan Air Force Mil Mi-17 helicopters, and immediate arrangements were made for the Sri Lankan team to return to Colombo on the next available flight. The second Test, which was the last scheduled fixture of the tour, was abandoned as a draw.

== Injuries ==
Several team members sustained minor wounds, including:

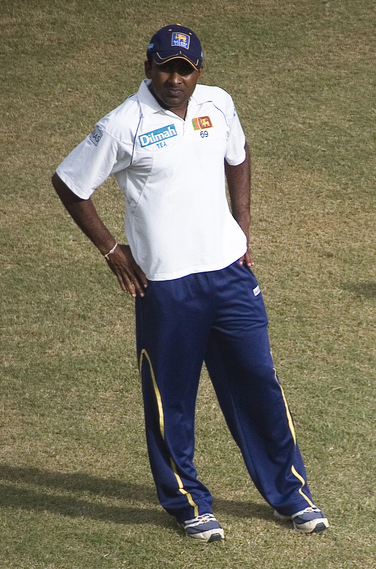
Sri Lankan captain Mahela Jayawardene was one of those injured.

- Thilan Samaraweera
- Kumar Sangakkara (vice-captain)
- Tharanga Paranavitana
- Ajantha Mendis
- Chaminda Vaas
- Mahela Jayawardene (captain)
- Suranga Lakmal

Six Pakistani policemen and two civilians were killed in the attack. Samaraweera and Paranavitana were hospitalised following the incident. The others had sustained minor injuries and shrapnel wounds. Samaraweera sustained shrapnel wounds to his thigh, and Paranavitana to his chest. The team's Assistant Coach Paul Farbrace was also injured. Although it was reported that Coach Trevor Bayliss also sustained minor injuries, it was later announced that this was incorrect.

Reserve umpire Ahsan Raza, who was travelling in a van for the umpires that was following the Sri Lankan team bus, was shot twice and taken to hospital. The driver of the minibus was killed in the attack.

== Investigation and attribution ==
Immediately following the attacks, Pakistani authorities blamed the Lashkar-e-Taiba (LeT), a militant organisation. Pakistani officials said that the attacks were similar to the Mumbai attacks. Most of the Pakistani press blamed Pakistani Islamist militants and Al-Qaeda for the attacks. Police said that kidnapping was a possible motive, but police officials refused to comment on this.

Sri Lankan Foreign Minister Rohitha Bogollagama said on 4 March that he could not rule out involvement of the rebel Liberation Tigers of Tamil Eelam (LTTE) in the Lahore attacks. Some European intelligence sources supported this suspicion. Sri Lankan military officials, on the other hand, were skeptical of LTTE involvement, and an LTTE spokesperson labelled reports of LTTE connection as 'not true'. A junior Pakistani cabinet minister said that the government had evidence that the attackers came from India. On 6 March 2009, government officials had ruled out the involvement of Indian intelligence agency Research and Analysis Wing and LTTE and were zeroing in on Lashkar-e-Taiba.

On the morning of the attack, the Sri Lankan and Pakistani cricket teams did not depart from the hotel together, as they had done on previous days, and the Pakistani team's schedule was delayed by 5 minutes. Statements by Australian umpire Simon Taufel, match referee Chris Broad, and spin bowler Muttiah Muralitharan, referencing this delay sparked conspiracy theories that the militants were acting on inside information. Later, Muralitharan expressed alarm at such interpretations of his comments and explained that he only suspected the gunmen to be monitoring the team movements.

Federal Bureau of Investigation director Robert Mueller arrived in Pakistan the day after these attacks and met with Pakistani officials to discuss security issues and the Mumbai attacks.

Interior Adviser Rehman Malik, told the National Assembly Standing Committee on the Interior that no evidence of LeT's involvement has been found so far, and that sufficient evidence has been surfaced pointing to involvement of a foreign hand.

=== Security lapse ===
The Investigation committee found three Superintendents of police (SPs) to have neglected the initial warning. by Intelligence agencies The Chief Minister of Punjab had also tipped off the authorities about a possible threat to the Sri Lankan team a month before.

=== Arrests ===
On 5 March, Salmaan Taseer, the governor of Punjab province, said the individuals responsible for the attack had been identified, but would not be revealed until the investigation was complete. The province offered a reward of 10 million rupees (US$125,000) for information leading to the capture of the militants responsible for the attack.

Police in Punjab arrested over 250 suspects, including 4 who were said to be 'prime suspects'. Police called Muhammad Aqeel, who ran a sports bikes business in Islampura, the mastermind behind the attack, and said that he had received a call from one of the militants at 9:05 am on the morning of the attacks asking for instructions. Though Aqeel was still absconding, his brother, Muhammad Faisal, had been arrested. Police also arrested Shahzad Babar of Rahim Yar Khan after a Subscriber Identity Module (SIM) card registered in his name was used in the attack along with eight others.

Security officials in Pakistan told The Times that most of the two dozen people arrested in connection with the attacks belonged to Jaish-e-Mohammed, Lashkar-e-Jhangvi, outlawed militant groups with close links to Al-Qaeda. Aqeel, who is an activist of Lashkar-e-Jhangvi, escaped a police raid on his home in Kahuta on 9 March 2009.

Also another gunman Zubair, aka Naik Mohammad, of Zubair, was arrested from Madina Colony, Walton Road in Lahore. He was a waiter at a hotel in Rawalpindi, when he was recruited by Sifullah. He went to Miram Shah and was trained in the use of different weapons.

Other accused including Samiullah, alias Ejaz of Nankana district, Adnan, alias Sajjad, Ajmal alias Ahsaan, Farooq, Ameer of Punjab Taliban, and Umer, alias Abdul Wahab of D. I. Khan, were still at large.

The attack was planned at Tauheed Hotel, and a house rented for this purpose in Madina Colony, Walton Road. The auto rickshaws used in the attack were purchased by Samiullah.

A secret investigative report has surfaced later prepared by the Additional Inspector General of the Crime Investigation Division, Punjab on 22 January 2009 outlining the potential threat to the Sri Lankan team.

== Reactions ==
=== Pakistan and Sri Lanka ===
Pakistan – The attack was condemned by the Pakistani president Asif Ali Zardari and prime minister Yousaf Raza Gillani. Governor Salmaan Taseer stated that the same people who executed the 2008 Mumbai attacks were responsible for this attack. Following the attack, Pakistan's interior minister Rehman Malik declared Pakistan to be "in a state of war". Pakistani officials also blamed India of covert involvement, citing long-standing enmity between the two South Asian countries. These claims were largely seen as an exercise in diverting attention away from the crisis.

Chief Minister of Punjab (Pakistan) Shehbaz Sharif criticised the current government and said that he had already tipped authorities of a possible attack beforehand.

Pakistani newspaper Dawn condemned the attack and cited security loopholes.

The Daily Times, blamed Al-Qaeda and the Lashkar-e Jhangvi in an editorial, stating, "International cricket is no longer possible in Pakistan; therefore we should stop accusing foreign teams of discriminating against Pakistan vis-à-vis India. The question here is of the survival of Pakistan, not of cricket." The Daily Jang, responding on Chris Broad, Simon Taufel and Steve Davis's comments, said that their "vivid description of the terrifying attack gives us an insight into how people everywhere will see the events of the morning of March 3." It went on to say the "men appeared genuinely shocked over the sight of Pakistani security men running for cover". The paper goes on to say that "their candid comments will seal the fate of Pakistan cricket for some time to come". It also said that Pakistan "must give up complaining" and that "ways to liven up the game at the domestic level need to be reconsidered with renewed urgency".

Sri Lanka – Sri Lankan president Mahinda Rajapaksa said, "I condemn this cowardly terrorist attack targeting the Sri Lankan cricket team. The Sri Lankan players had gone to Pakistan as ambassadors of goodwill." Prime Minister Ratnasiri Wickremanayake said that "Sri Lanka and Pakistan share a very close relationship and we will take all steps to protect this relationship." The driver of the bus whose presence of mind saved the cricketers was hailed as a hero. The Sri Lankan team praised the bus driver. Then-captain of the Sri Lanka cricket team Mahela Jayawardene praised Khalil saying he owed his life to the driver. Spinner Muttiah Muralitharan also gave Khalil his team shirt.

=== Others ===
United Nations – Secretary General Ban Ki-moon strongly condemned the attacks according to UN spokesman Marie Okabe. She also added that "Any attack targeting civilians, in this case athletes, is despicable and unjustifiable, and we urge authorities in Pakistan to do all in their power to find the culprits and bring them to justice."

The International Cricket Council – Chief Executive Haroon Lorgat said:

We note with dismay and regret the events of this morning in Lahore and we condemn this attack without reservation. It is a source of great sadness that there have been a number of fatalities in this attack and it is also very upsetting for the wider cricket family that some of the Sri Lanka players and one match official have been injured in this attack. At this time our thoughts and prayers are with the injured people and also the families of those who have died.

The West Indies Cricket Board made a statement through president Julian Hunte and said "It was a sad day for International Cricket", and gave their full sympathy to the Sri Lankan players and the umpires.

Indian and New Zealand players wore black armbands while playing their next One Day International as a show of solidarity towards the Sri Lankan players injured in the attack, as did Australia and South Africa while playing their next test.

=== Other countries ===
Australia – Prime Minister Kevin Rudd also condemned the attack on the Sri Lankan cricket team, calling it "shameful and cowardly". He demanded answers from Pakistan after claims that police left Australians travelling with Sri Lanka's cricket team in the lurch as the bus was attacked. "I am sufficiently concerned about what has been said by the Australians that we need an explanation and we intend to get one." Foreign Minister Stephen Smith said the attack demonstrates that there is a persistent threat to Pakistan's very existence and showed the need for a tougher war against extremists.

China – Foreign Ministry spokesman Qin Gang said that the Chinese government expressed deep condolences to the victims and sincere sympathy to the wounded.

France – French Ministry of Foreign and European Affairs expressed solidarity with the Pakistani people and authorities at this "testing time".

India – Home Minister P. Chidambaram expressed shock over the attack on the Sri Lankan cricket team in Pakistan: "We condemn the incident. We are sorry for the Sri Lankan team. We hope that the players ... I read two, three names ... Samaraweera, Mendis ... I hope they are safe and will recover. We are shocked by that incident." Further he said that Pakistan could become a failed state and it was not clear who was in control of the country.

New Zealand - Prime Minister John Key was outraged over the attack. He called it a "despicable terrorist act" while condemning the attack. He further said that he intends to convey "a message of condolence to the Sri Lankan Government and Sri Lankan cricket team".

Turkey – Foreign Minister Ali Babacan called Pakistan's Foreign Minister Makhdoom Shah Mehmood Qureshi and offered his condolences personally and on behalf of the government and the people of Turkey.

United Kingdom – Prime Minister Gordon Brown, commenting on the attacks, said that Pakistan must clamp down on such perpetrators in its midst and said that a vast majority of Al-Qaeda fighters were in Pakistan, adding the government must make arrests to show it is "fulfilling its role in the world community". Foreign Secretary David Miliband stated that Pakistan was facing a "mortal threat" from internal militancy.

United States – President Barack Obama expressed deep concern over the attack. Secretary of State Hillary Clinton called these attacks an "eerie replica" of the Mumbai attacks and said Pakistan was facing a serious internal security threat. Ambassador to Afghanistan Christopher Dell mused that Pakistan potentially posed a bigger security problem for the rest of the world than Afghanistan.

== Criticism ==
Politician and former Pakistan cricket captain Imran Khan criticised the security arrangements and said that the security provided was 10 times less than what is provided to government officials such as Rehman Malik.

Match referee Chris Broad was also critical of the security provided. He stated that he and his colleagues were left like 'sitting ducks' in the trailing minivan during the attack. He also accused the security personnel of fleeing the scene. He questioned why the Pakistan team which usually travelled with the Sri Lankan team was delayed by seven minutes that day and avoided being attacked. Javed Miandad was critical of Broad's comments and demanded that International Cricket Council ban him for life. Pakistan Cricket Board lodged a formal complaint against Chris Broad with the International Cricket Council on 9 March 2009. Ijaz Butt, the head of Pakistan Cricket Board accused Broad of lying. Umpire Simon Taufel also said that the umpire's minibus was abandoned while the players' bus was moved to the ground to evacuate the players. Criticising the security entourage for abandoning them and inability of the police to arrest the attackers Simon said, "You tell me why no one was caught. You tell me why. Supposedly 25 armed commandos were in our convoy, and when the team bus got going again, we were left on our own."

Co-umpire Steve Davis said "he felt let down" by the security. International Cricket Council umpires performance manager for East Asia, Sri Lanka and Pakistan, Peter Manuel told Dawn that the minivan carrying the umpires was basically abandoned by the security personnel: "It was unbelievable. Bullets were raining on us and not a shot was fired in our defense by the Pakistan security officials." Sri Lanka coach Trevor Bayliss backed the comments made by Simon Taufel, Chris Broad and Steve Davis criticising the security. Intikhab Alab, Pakistan cricket team's coach, asked Chris Broad to apologise to his country and team due to the remarks he made against Pakistani police security. English cricketer Dominic Cork who was commentating in Pakistan on the series and who himself was caught in the attack later criticised the security and Pakistan Cricket Board chairman Ijaz Butt.

Sri Lankan bowler Muttiah Muralitharan said the security arrangement was the worst he had ever seen, and vastly inferior to that provided in Sri Lanka. He said "The security people we had didn't even seem to fight back. Were they professionals with enough training? They didn't seem to know what to do. I was surprised the terrorists were able to just reload the magazines and keep firing, and they never got caught. It was shameful. If this had happened in Colombo they would never have got away."

Eyewitness Habib Akram, bureau chief of SAMAA TV news channel, said that the gunmen were very calm as they moved and fired by turns and that there was hardly any fire returned by the police. His office overlooks the traffic circle where the incident took place. Closed-circuit television footage of the event reported by Geo TV showed four of the attackers walking or jogging away unchallenged from the site, into a marketplace while no policemen are seen.

Former president and former army chief Pervez Musharraf criticised the police commandos inability to kill any of the gunmen, saying "If this was the elite force I would expect them to have shot down those people who attacked them, the reaction, their training should be on a level that if anyone shoots toward the company they are guarding, in less than three seconds they should shoot the man down." In spite the ICC umpires, referee and Sri Lankan team heavily criticized Pakistani police and security services present on the attack site for their incompetence, Governor of Punjab province where the attack took place in Pakistan, gave medals and awards to honour valour and bravery of police officials for fighting the terrorists during the attack, which was met with severe controversy and described as "ironic".

== Aftermath ==
Insurance cost for cricket matches in India, Pakistan, Bangladesh and Sri Lanka rose.

The New Zealand team cancelled its December 2009 tour of Pakistan. Bangladesh also put off a scheduled tour by Pakistan to Bangladesh.

The Union Home Minister of India, P. Chidambaram, said that the Indian Premier League should consider postponing the forthcoming T20 league matches due to be held over 45 days from 10 April to 24 May 2009 in 9 Indian cities, since in the light of these attacks, security forces would be stretched too thin between the league matches and the five phases of the forthcoming general elections in India. The elections were slated to be held between 16 April and 13 May and it was impossible to reschedule them while IPL organisers appeared to be unwilling to postpone the tournament. Former England coach Duncan Fletcher said that English players contracted to the IPL would now be more concerned for their safety. The 2009 Indian Premier League was hosted by South Africa between 18 April and 24 May 2009. Former Indian captain Sourav Ganguly said after these attacks Pakistan was not a safe venue to play cricket.

The 2011 Cricket World Cup was to be co-hosted by Pakistan, India, Sri Lanka and Bangladesh, but in the wake of this attack on the Sri Lankan cricket team the International Cricket Council (ICC) stripped Pakistan of its hosting rights due to security concerns. The headquarters of the organising committee were originally situated in Lahore, but was then shifted to Mumbai. Pakistan was supposed to hold 14 matches, including one semi-final. Eight of Pakistan's matches were awarded to India, four to Sri Lanka and two to Bangladesh.

The Sri Lankan Foreign minister has said the Sri Lankan cricket team "will give highest consideration to the invitation extended to it to undertake visit again. Sri Lanka will not allow Pakistan's isolation in cricket." In October 2017, the Sri Lankan cricket team returned to Pakistan for the first time since the attack to play a Twenty20 International match at the Gaddafi Stadium. In September 2019, the Sri Lankan team toured Pakistan, playing a 3-match One-Day International series in National Stadium, Karachi and a 3-match Twenty20 International series in Gaddafi Stadium, Lahore.

In December 2019, Sri Lanka agreed to play a two-match test series in Pakistan, thus marking test cricket's return to Pakistan after a decade since the terror attack.

== See also ==
- Attack on Pakistani ambassador to Sri Lanka
- Togo national football team attack
- List of terrorist incidents in Pakistan since 2001
- Sri Lankan cricket team in Pakistan in 2008–09
- Terrorism in Pakistan
