= Ivo Žďárek =

Czech diplomat (1960-2008)

Czech Republic Ambassador to Vietnam
- In office 2004 – August 2008
- President: Václav Klaus
- Preceded by: Luboš Nový
- Succeeded by: Michal Král

Czech Republic Ambassador to Pakistan
- In office August 2008 – 20 September 2008
- President: Václav Klaus
- Preceded by: Alexandr Langer
- Succeeded by: Pavol Šepeľák

Personal details
- Born: 6 November 1960 Trutnov, Czechoslovakia
- Died: 20 September 2008 (aged 47) Islamabad Marriott Hotel, Pakistan
- Education: Stanford University

Ivo Žďárek (6 November 1960 – 20 September 2008) was a Czech diplomat. He died in the fire in the aftermath of the Islamabad Marriott Hotel bombing trying to rescue people from the burning building.

== Early life ==
He studied at the Moscow State Institute of International Relations in Moscow, at the Charles University in Prague, at Stanford University, and the Czech Diplomatic Academy. He had a wife, Jana, and two children.

== Diplomatic career ==
Žďárek worked at various diplomatic missions of the Czech Republic in Asia. He served as consul-general in Shanghai, People's Republic of China from 1995 to 1999. From 2004 to August 2008, he was the ambassador in Vietnam. He then became the ambassador to Pakistan.

== Death ==
Žďárek survived the bombing of the Islamabad Marriott Hotel, but went in to help other survivors get out of the burning building. He called with his mobile phone asking to be rescued but was unable to escape the blaze.

Žďárek's body was returned to his country. A ceremony paying homage to him was held at Prague's airport.

"We are all very saddened, we always appreciated the ambassador’s work considerably."

– Czech President Václav Klaus

The ceremony was attended by Žďárek's family and Prime Minister Mirek Topolánek.
