= Pakistan Services Limited =

Pakistani hospitality company

- Type: Public
- Traded as: PSX: PSEL; KSE 100 component
- Industry: Hospitality
- Founded: December 6, 1958; 67 years ago in Karachi, Pakistan
- Headquarters: Islamabad, Pakistan
- Area served: Pakistan
- Key people: Sadruddin Hashwani (Chairman); Bastien Blanc (CEO)
- Revenue: ▲ Rs. 13.26 billion (US$47 million) (2023)
- Operating income: ▼ Rs. 67.77 million (US$240,000) (2023)
- Net income: ▼ Rs. -218.27 million (US$−780,000) (2023)
- Total assets: ▼ Rs. 64.74 billion (US$230 million) (2023)
- Total equity: ▼ Rs. 44.93 billion (US$160 million) (2023)
- Number of employees: 1,660 (2023)
- Parent: Hashoo Group
- Website: psl.com.pk

Pakistan Services Limited (PSL) is a Pakistani hotel company that owns and operates the Pearl-Continental chain and is headquartered in Islamabad.

It was formed in 1958 with the backing of Pakistan International Airlines (PIA) and Pan American World Airways (Pan Am) to build InterContinental hotels in West and East Pakistan, and came under the government control in the 1970s after he nationalisation of private banks, before its sale to Sadruddin Hashwani in 1984.

== History ==
Pakistan Services Limited (PSL) was incorporated in Karachi on December 6, 1958, as a public limited company. It was a joint venture between Pakistan International Airlines (PIA) and Pan American World Airways (Pan Am) to build InterContinental hotels in Pakistan. In March 1961, PIA announced plans for six hotels, four in West Pakistan, at Karachi, Lahore, Rawalpindi and Peshawar, and two in East Pakistan, at Dacca and Chittagong. By October 1961, PSL was a consortium of Pan Am's subsidiary Inter-Continental Hotels Corporation (IHC), PIA and Haroon Sons, a company of the family of Yusuf Haroon. The government let PIA take as much as 30 percent of the equity, while IHC was to take a quarter of the shares with rupees borrowed from the United States government's Cooley loan fund.

In 1961, work began on the first, the ten-storey, 300-room InterContinental hotel in Karachi. It was designed by the New York architect William B. Tabler and was budgeted at about US$7 million. Of that sum, US$3.37 million was lent by the Export–Import Bank of Washington with a guarantee from the Industrial Development Bank of Pakistan. President Ayub Khan opened the hotel on May 10, 1964, and PSL's shares were quoted on the Karachi Stock Exchange from that year. The Dacca InterContinental began operating in November 1966, and the hotels in Rawalpindi and Lahore opened in 1967. Together the four hotels had about 1,000 rooms and had cost about Rs 150 million. IHC ran them under a 20-year management contract, and in 1966 PIA owned 20 percent of PSL while IHC owned 16.5 percent. PSL was chaired by the heads of PIA, first Nur Khan and then Asghar Khan, with Yusuf Haroon as managing director. By June 1970, Haroon was serving as its chairman.

PIA also planned smaller hotels. In 1967, its chief announced a Rs 44.5 million chain of small hotels in cities and resort areas, for which PIA's board had approved about Rs 10 million and to which PSL was expected to contribute. Later that year, Pan Am invested US$3.1 million in a US$11.5 million joint venture with PSL and PIA to put up 14 tourist hotels in Pakistan's smaller towns. Separately from PSL, the airline owned and ran a chain of smaller hotels, among them Midway House at Karachi airport and hotels in Larkana, Sukkur, Saidu Sharif and Gilgit, and by 1982 it had a wholly owned subsidiary named PIA Hotels. In 1985, a company owned by the Aga Khan was taking over four small provincial PIA hotels, to be run under its Serena brand.

After the Bangladesh Liberation War of 1971, PSL lost control of the Dacca hotel and its earnings. The state-owned Bangladesh Services Limited was treated as PSL's successor for the hotel and its loans, and IHC signed a five-year contract with it in May 1973 to continue managing the property. In Pakistan, PSL came under the government control in the early 1970s, when the banks that owned 40 percent of its shares were nationalised. PIA owned a further 22 percent. PSL's plans for a hotel and ski facilities at Malam Jabba in Swat were under discussion by April 1972. The 150-room Khyber InterContinental in Peshawar, a franchised member of the InterContinental chain, opened in October 1975. In 1980, PSL, then a subsidiary of PIA, formed a company named Malam Jabba Resort to develop the ski resort. By 1982, PIA held a controlling share in PSL, which owned four InterContinental hotels in Pakistan. That year, IHC sold a minority stake to Galadari family, and the Haroon family's Allied Industrial group was another minority shareholder.

In 1984, the government decided to sell the combined 62 percent held by the nationalised banks and PIA, since the hotels required costly modernisation and were hampered by mismanagement. Three of the four hotels were losing money at the time, and profits at the Karachi hotel were declining. The Banking Council of Pakistan invited bids. The Haroon family's Allied group raised its offer to Rs 55.50 a share during negotiations, but it was outbid by Sadruddin Hashwani, the owner of the Holiday Inn hotels in Karachi and Islamabad, who offered Rs 56. The Haroons argued without success that the sale would give Hashwani a monopoly over six of the country's nine leading hotels. The family was then out of favour with the government, as Mahmoud Haroon had recently left the post of interior minister following differences with President Zia-ul-Haq. The 51 percent stake, made up of 2,286,024 shares, was sold in December 1984 for about Rs 128 million, when the shares were trading at Rs 12.50 on the market. At the time, Herald, a monthly magazine owned by Haroon family, published articles alleging irregularities in the sale. PSL took over the management of the hotels from IHC on October 1, 1985, with Hashwani as its chairman, and renamed them Pearl-Continental.

The new management drew up a Rs 150 million development plan for the hotels and a separate Rs 200 million scheme to add 200 rooms at Lahore. PSL added a resort hotel at Bhurban in the Murree hills, built in 1990–91 at a cost of more than Rs 550 million. In 1993, the International Finance Corporation approved financing for a US$52.1 million project to enlarge the Lahore hotel and strengthen PSL's balance sheet. The expansion, which added 300 rooms and was also funded by the Commonwealth Development Corporation and the German development bank DEG, was completed in 1996.

In 2025, Dawood Jan Muhammad and AKD Holding acquired 56% of the stake in Pakistan Services Limited.
