= Syed Mumtaz Alam Gillani =

Pakistani politician and lawyer (1940–2020)

Federal Minister of Human Rights
- In office 3 November 2008 – 3 November 2008
- President: Asif Ali Zardari
- Prime Minister: Yousaf Raza Gillani

Member of National Assembly
- In office 19 March 2008 – 3 November 2008
- Constituency: 189th constituency (Bahawalnagar-II)

Personal details
- Born: 20 January 1940
- Died: 17 March 2020 (aged 80)
- Party: Pakistan Peoples Party Parliamentarians
- Relations: Shafqat Hussain (father), Hamida Begum (mother); Syed Imtiaz Alam Gilani, Syed Aijaz Alam Gilani (brothers)
- Profession: Lawyer

Syed Mumtaz Alam Gillani (also spelled Gilani and Geelani) (20 January 1940 – 17 March 2020) was a Pakistani lawyer who served as federal minister of Human Rights, a new portfolio, the Ministry of Human Rights which was carved out of the ministry of law and justice. Gillani was voted into the National Assembly of Pakistan in March 2008. He was a member of the Standing Committees on Environment and Information and Broadcasting, however, these positions were revoked as a matter of procedure following his appointment to federal minister. He was a founding member and senior leader of the Pakistan Peoples Party.

== Career ==
Alam Gillani entered politics when he first got elected to the local parliamentary assembly in the 1960s and he became a member of PPP at its founding in 1967. He also campaigned for Fatima Jinnah, the sister of Muhammad Ali Jinnah, when she ran against Ayub Khan in the presidential elections of 1965. Gillani represented the 189th constituency, one of the four constituencies of the southern Punjab metropolis Bahawalnagar. Having run as an independent candidate, he joined the PPPP (Pakistan People's Party Parliamentarians) following the 2008 General Election. The first time Gillani met as an MNA (member of the National Assembly) was in the 1988–1990 assembly when he represented the 144th constituency. In the 2002 General Election Gillani, then representing the Pakistan Muslim League, stood for election in the 189th district and lost to then PPPP candidate Mian Mumtaz Ahmed Matiana.

He was president of the District Bar Association in Bahawalnagar. During his law practice he also became a judge of an appellate tribunal. In March 2006 Gillani addressed a rally in Bahawalnagar organised by the District Bar Association protesting the Muhammad cartoons that were first printed in the Danish newspaper Jyllands-Posten.

A March 2009 disclosure of government minister finances published in Pakistan's Daily Times revealed Alam Gilani's net worth to be around US$60,000. Another disclosure published by Geo TV in September 2010 revealed that 24 government ministers did not pay income tax. Syed Mumtaz Alam Gillani was not among them however, though the amount he had paid was a mere Rs 1,203, the lowest amount among the ministers who had paid taxes. The results were based on 2008 figures obtained from the Election Commission of Pakistan.

In June 2008 Gillani pleaded in the National Assembly for the Prime Minister to announce a special package so that clean drinking water could be provided to Bahawalnagar District citing a survey which indicated high rate of hepatitis in District Bahawalnagar as compared to other districts of the country because of non-availability of clean drinking water in the area. Gillani also proposed that small farmers should be given interest-free loans to make the country self-sufficient in agriculture. In July Gillani announced that the Prime Minister on his request had promised to provide Rs. 120 million (about US$1.5 million) to complete ongoing developmental projects in the District Bahawalnagar.

During riots across Punjab in protest against those people seen as responsible for Pakistan's electricity problems, rioters attempted to storm the house of Syed Mumtaz Alam Gillani on Sunday 17 June 2012 with police having to protect Gillani's house on Eidgah Road.

== The Islamabad Marriott Hotel bombing ==
The bombing of the Marriott Hotel in Islamabad on Saturday 20 September 2008 was followed the next day by an article in the Pakistani newspaper The News International written by journalist Ansar Abbasi in which an account is presented of Alam Gillani being present outside the Marriott several days preceding the attack, witnessing, and protesting, a serious security breach. The story was retold also in other publications based on the story in The News. The story describes how Alam Gillani and two friends witnessed steel boxes being unloaded from a US Embassy truck by US Marines. The article by Abbasi does not reveal who the newspaper's source is for the events being described involving Alam Gillani. Among the several people who witnessed this incident was allegedly also PPP leader Sajjad Chaudhry. The article states that Alam Gilani was the only one who objected to and protested the apparent security breach that was taking place and that he was met with silence from the American marines. The hotel security staff also did not respond to Alam Gilani's protests as they passively watched what was taking place, not being allowed to go near the boxes by the US marines. On Monday, two days after the terrorist attack, Mumtaz Alam Gillani pronounced that the story presented by Abbasi in The News was a "pack of lies" and contrary to all professional ethics. He stated that on the night in question he was standing outside the Marriott making "conversation in a light mood with the reporter". In this version of the events which was printed in a short article in the Associated Press of Pakistan (APP) Gillani only tells of having relayed to the journalist that "Pakistan is a victim of terrorism". Alam Gillani also states that he has contacted Abbasi and demanded that the journalist contradict the article in The News "and tender unconditional apology as he tried to belittle my image as Member of the parliament in the eyes of people particularly of my constituency" and also that he would be issuing a legal notice and if necessary sue Abbasi and The News if after 10 days his demands were not met. In a reply in The News on Tuesday the 23rd, Ansar Abbasi denies having spoken with Mumtaz Alam Gillani, ever. Abbasi explains that the 21 September story "was based on the eyewitness account of a source, which narrated the whole episode of what many witnessed that night", and that it was this source who "quoted the PPP MNA objecting and protesting to the Marines' activity." According to this source Alam Gillani was shouting thus attracting the attention of several others. Abbasi also expressed his bemusement that the image presented of Alam Gillani in any way could be seen as belittling the MP. Abbasi also claimed that one of Alam Gillani's friends who was accompanying him during the alleged incident had confirmed the accuracy of the 21 September story in The News. The 23 September article ends by stating "The News stands by the story."

Political offices
Preceded by none	Federal Minister of Human Rights; 2008	Succeeded by
