= New Zealand cricket team in Pakistan in 2002 =

The New Zealand national cricket team was due to tour Pakistan in September to October 2001 but the tour was cancelled for security reasons in the wake of the World Trade Center & The Pentagon attacks on 11 September 2001. Three Tests had been scheduled at Arbab Niaz Stadium, Peshawar; Iqbal Stadium, Faisalabad; and the National Stadium, Karachi. Instead, New Zealand visited Pakistan in April to May 2002 and played a two-match Test series against the Pakistani national cricket team, but the tour was half played and remaining matches were cancelled following 2002 Karachi bus bombing. Pakistan won the Test series 1–0. New Zealand were captained by Stephen Fleming and Pakistan by Waqar Younis. In addition, the teams played a three-match Limited Overs International (LOI) series which Pakistan won 3–0.

== One Day Internationals (ODIs) ==
Pakistan won the series 3-0.

=== 1st ODI ===
21 April 2002 (D/N)
Scorecard

Pakistan; 275/6 (50 overs)	v	New Zealand; 122 (30 overs)
Yousuf Youhana 125 (155); DR Tuffey 2/24 (6 overs)		NJ Astle 25 (27); Shoaib Akhtar 6/16 (9 overs)

Pakistan won by 153 runs
National Stadium, Karachi
Umpires: SA Bucknor (WI) and Nadeem Ghauri (PAK)
Player of the match: Shoaib Akhtar (PAK)

- Pakistan won the toss and elected to bat.
- RG Hart (NZ) made his ODI debut.

=== 2nd ODI ===
24 April 2002 (D/N)
Scorecard

New Zealand; 277/5 (50 overs)	v	Pakistan; 278/7 (47.1 overs)
CD McMillan 105 (116); Waqar Younis 2/45 (10 overs)		Abdul Razzaq 86 (84); SB Styris 2/53 (10 overs)

Pakistan won by 3 wickets
Rawalpindi Cricket Stadium, Rawalpindi
Umpires: Aleem Dar (PAK) and SA Bucknor (WI)
Player of the match: Abdul Razzaq (PAK)

- New Zealand won the toss and elected to bat.

=== 3rd ODI ===
27 April 2002 (D/N)
Scorecard

Pakistan; 278/5 (50 overs)	v	New Zealand; 212 (45.4 overs)
Shoaib Malik 115 (142); BGK Walker 2/49 (10 overs)		CD McMillan 38 (48); Shoaib Malik 3/37 (10 overs)

Pakistan won by 66 runs
Gaddafi Stadium, Lahore
Umpires: Aleem Dar (PAK) and SA Bucknor (WI)
Player of the match: Shoaib Malik (PAK)

- Pakistan won the toss and elected to bat.
- Misbah-ul-Haq (PAK) made his ODI debut.

== Test series summary ==
=== 1st Test ===
1–3 May 2002
(5-day match)
Scorecard

Pakistan	v	New Zealand
643 (157.5 overs); Inzamam-ul-Haq 329 (436); CD McMillan 3/48 (18 overs)		73 (30.2 overs); L Vincent 21 (46); Shoaib Akhtar 6/11 (8.2 overs)
		246 (76.3 overs) (f/o); SP Fleming 66 (124); Danish Kaneria 5/110 (32 overs)

Pakistan won by an innings and 324 runs
Gaddafi Stadium, Lahore
Umpires: SA Bucknor (WI) and RE Koertzen (SA)
Player of the match: Inzamam-ul-Haq (PAK)

- Pakistan won the toss and elected to bat.
- The match was scheduled for five days but completed in three.
- RG Hart (NZ) made his Test debut.
- This loss is still New Zealand's biggest in Test cricket, and the fifth biggest of all-time.

=== 2nd Test ===
8–12 May 2002
(5-day match)
Scorecard

Pakistan	v	New Zealand

Match abandoned
National Stadium, Karachi
Umpires: SA Bucknor (WI) and RE Koertzen (SA)

- Match cancelled for security reasons after a bomb exploded near the New Zealand team's hotel two hours before the scheduled start of play
