= Hashoo Group =

Pakistani business conglomerate

- Type: Corporate group
- Founded: 1960; 66 years ago
- Headquarters: Islamabad, Pakistan
- Key people: Sadruddin Hashwani (chairman)
- Total assets: ▲US$3.8 billion (2021)
- Website: hashoogroup.com

Hashoo Group (Urdu pronunciation: [hɑːˈʃuː] hah-SHOO) is a group of companies headquartered in Islamabad. It is active in hospitality, oil and gas sectors. It was founded in 1960.

== History ==
Hashoo Group was established in 1960 as Hassan Ali & Company, a commodities trading company based in Karachi Port. By the 1970s, it had become one of Pakistan's largest trading companies. However, in 1972, the Government of Pakistan nationalized cotton and rice exports leading the Hashoo Group to diversify into the hospitality sector. In 1978, the group established Holiday Inn Hotel in Karachi, and then another one in Islamabad in 1981. Both of the hotels were converted into Marriott brand in the 1990s. In 1985, the group made a successful bid for the majority shares of Pakistan Services Limited, which then owned four Inter-Continental Hotels across Pakistan, the hotels were re-branded into Pearl-Continental Hotels.

In 1995, Hashoo acquired the US-based corporation Occidental Petroleum's Pakistan operations (now known as Orient Petroleum Inc.).

In 2001, Hashoo acquired the Destinations of the World franchise in Pakistan. In 2012, the group launched Hotel One, a mid-range hotel chain in Pakistan.

In 2008, Hashoo Group founded a budget hotel chain called Hotel One which operates on the franchising model.

In October 2013, Tullow Pakistan exited the Pakistani market and sold its assets to Ocean Pakistan Limited, a subsidiary of the Hashoo Group.

In March 2016, BHP Billiton sold its Pakistani oil and gas operations to Hashoo Group.

== Companies ==
=== Tours and travels ===
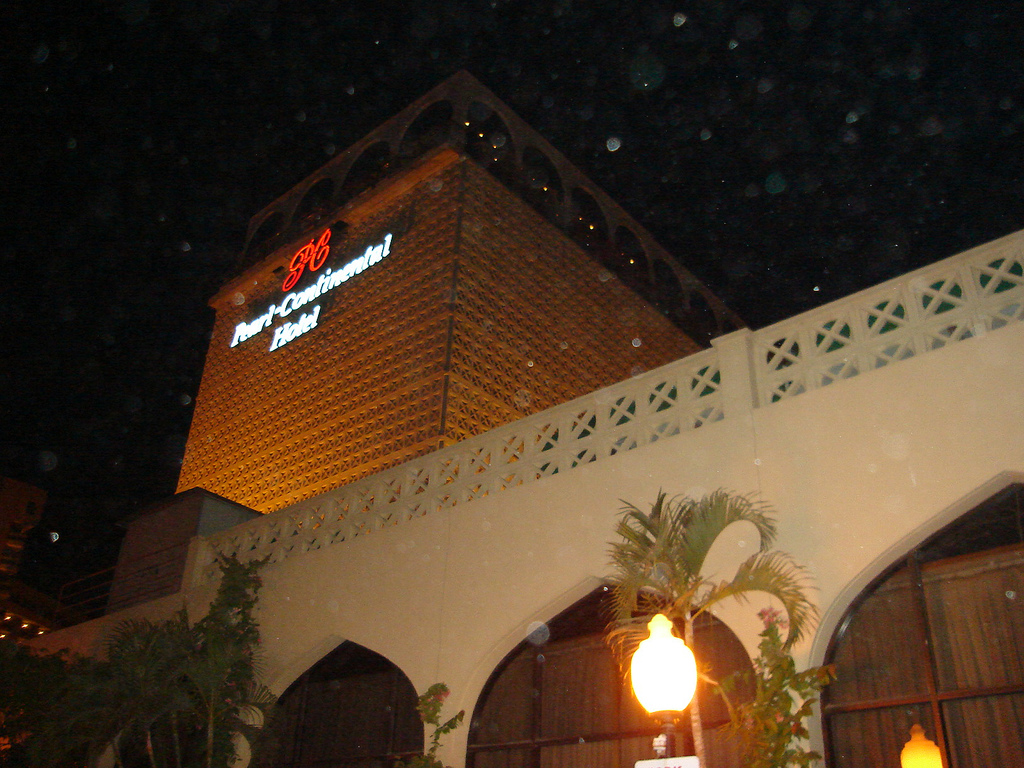
The Pearl Continental Hotel in Karachi

- Pearl Tour & Travels
- Trans Air Travels
- Destinations of the World - Pakistan
- Marriott Hotels, Pakistan
- Pearl-Continental Hotels & Resorts with locations in all major cities of Pakistan
- Hotel One by PC

=== Information technology ===
- Net-21 (Pvt) Limited

=== Oil and gas ===
- Ocean Pakistan Limited
- Zaaver Petroleum Corporation Limited
- OPI Gas (Pvt) Limited

=== Minerals ===
- Zaver Chemicals (Pvt) Limited
- Zaver Mining Company Limited
- Zaver Oils Limited

=== Pharmaceuticals ===
- Gelcaps (Pakistan) Ltd.

=== Ceramics ===
- Pearl Ceramics (Previously known as Cera-e-Noor)

=== Investments ===
- Pakistan Services Limited (PSL) operating Pearl Continental Hotel chain of 6 hotels in Pakistan
- Hashwani Sales & Services (Pvt) Limited

=== Trading companies ===
- Hashoo International (Pvt) Limited
- Hasan Ali & Company (Pvt) Limited
- Genesis Trading (Pvt) Limited
- Muzaffar and Companies

=== Welfare ===
- Hashoo Foundation

== See also ==
- List of largest companies in Pakistan
