= Pearl-Continental Hotels & Resorts =

Pakistan hotel chain

Pearl Continental Hotels and Resorts Pakistan
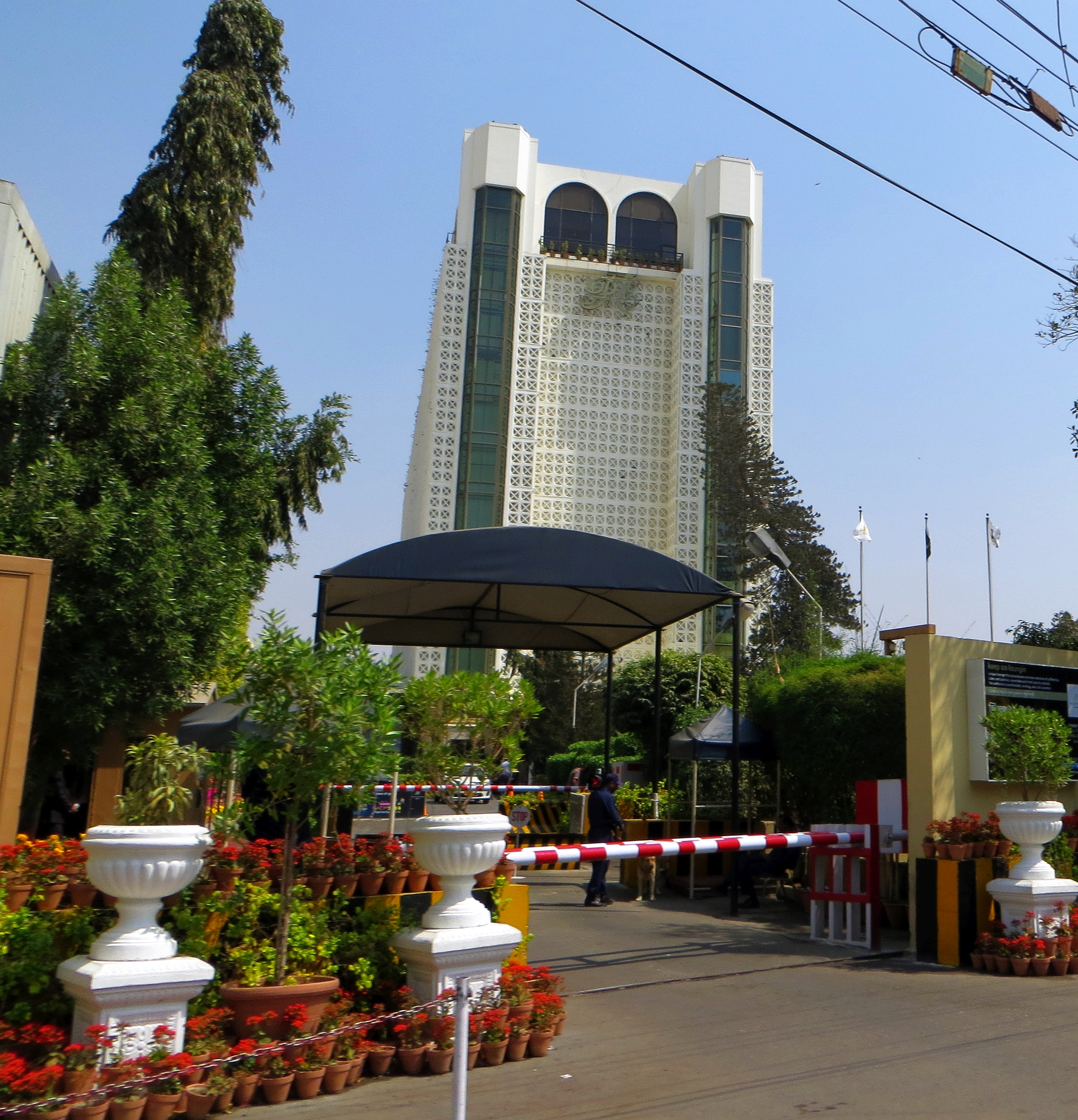
- Pearl-Continental Hotel in Karachi
- Formerly: InterContinental Hotels
- Type: Public
- Traded as: PSX: PSEL; KSE 100 component
- Industry: Hospitality
- Founder: Government of Pakistan
- Headquarters: Islamabad, Pakistan
- Number of locations: Karachi, Lahore, Rawalpindi, Bhurban, Muzaffarabad, Malam Jabba, Skardu, Hunza
- Area served: Pakistan
- Key people: Sadruddin Hashwani (Chairman); Murtaza Hashwani (CEO)
- Revenue: ▲ Rs. 15.04 billion (US$54 million) (2024)
- Operating income: ▲ Rs. 370.13 million (US$1.3 million) (2024)
- Net income: ▲ Rs. 425.46 million (US$1.5 million) (2024)
- Total assets: ▼ Rs. 62.26 billion (US$220 million) (2024)
- Total equity: ▲ Rs. 45.89 billion (US$160 million) (2024)
- Number of employees: 1,704 (2024)
- Parent: Hashoo Group
- Website: pchotels.com

Pearl-Continental Hotels & Resorts (also abbreviated to PC Hotels) is a Pakistani hotel chain founded and operated by Pakistan Services Limited. It owns properties in Karachi, Lahore, Rawalpindi, Bhurban, Muzaffarabad and Malam Jabba.

== History ==
The first Pearl-Continental Hotel (Intercontinental Hotel at the time - part of an international chain) in Karachi was inaugurated by President Muhammad Ayub Khan on 10 May 1964 and was the first five-star hotel in Pakistan. It was a member of the Leading Hotels of the World for over a decade. A new hotel was built for Lahore and Rawalpindi in 1967 with another branch opening in Peshawar in 1975.

In 2021, Hashoo group also launched a chain of four-star hotels under the brand name PC Legacy. The PC Legacy Naran is functional and operating in Naran and another opened in Nasirabad, Hunza in 2023.

== Incidents ==
In 1971, when the Pearl-Continental (or Khyber Intercontinental at the time) construction was initiated in Peshawar, workers digging underground to form its foundation discovered old human, elephant and horse bones. Archaeologists discovered that the Hotel was the site of a battle between the armies of Mahmud of Ghazni and Jayapala in the Battle of Peshawar in the year 1001.

On 11 May 2019, at least eight people including four hotel employees, one soldier and three terrorists were killed in a terror attack targeting the Pearl Continental in Gwadar, Balochistan, Pakistan.

On Thursday night 26 May 2022, the roof of the 5-star property collapsed at Karachi's Pearl-Continental Hotel. According to the reports one person was killed and three others injured after the ceiling of the five-star hotel caved in on top of them. The incident occurred inside the Marco Polo Hall at the hotel where an event was under way.

== Gallery ==
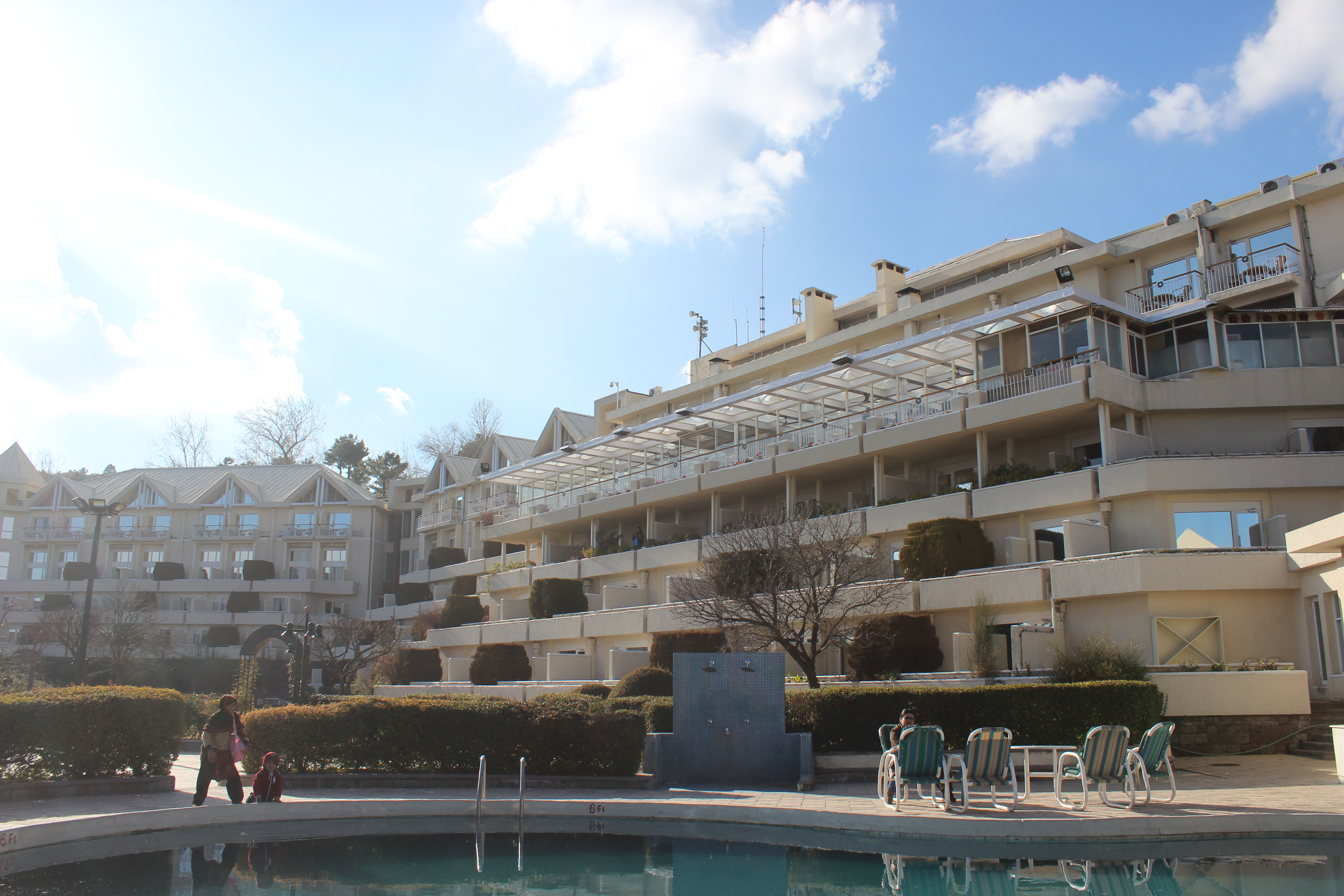
PC resort in Bhurban

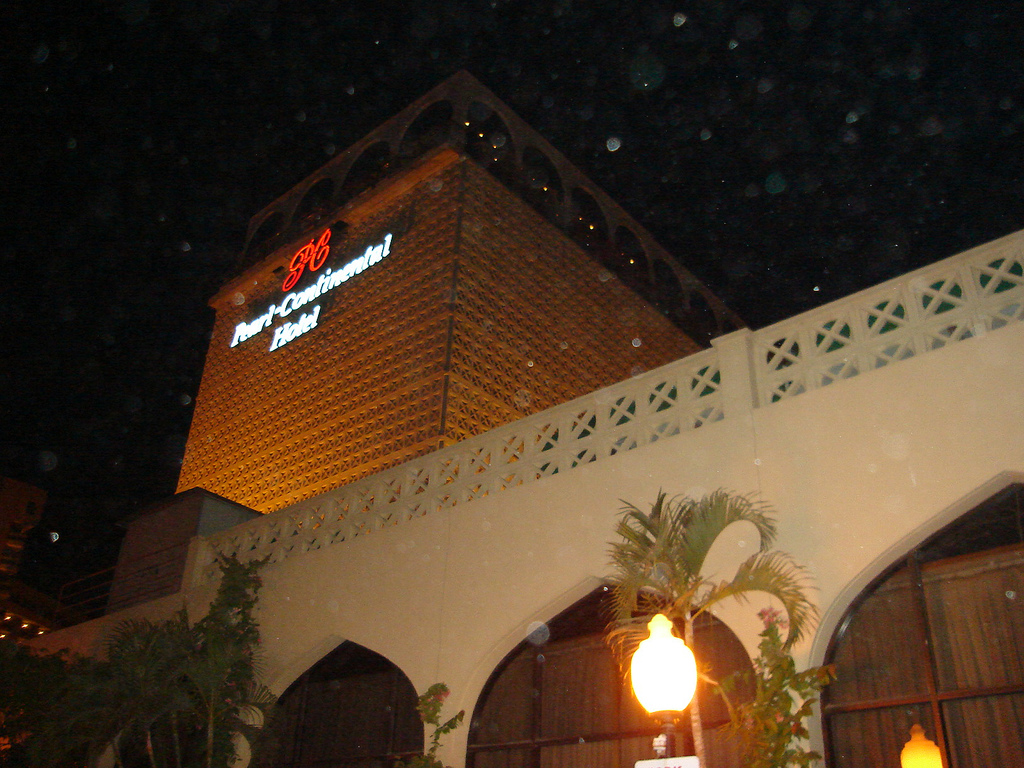
Karachi PC
