= Sadruddin Hashwani =

Pakistani businessman

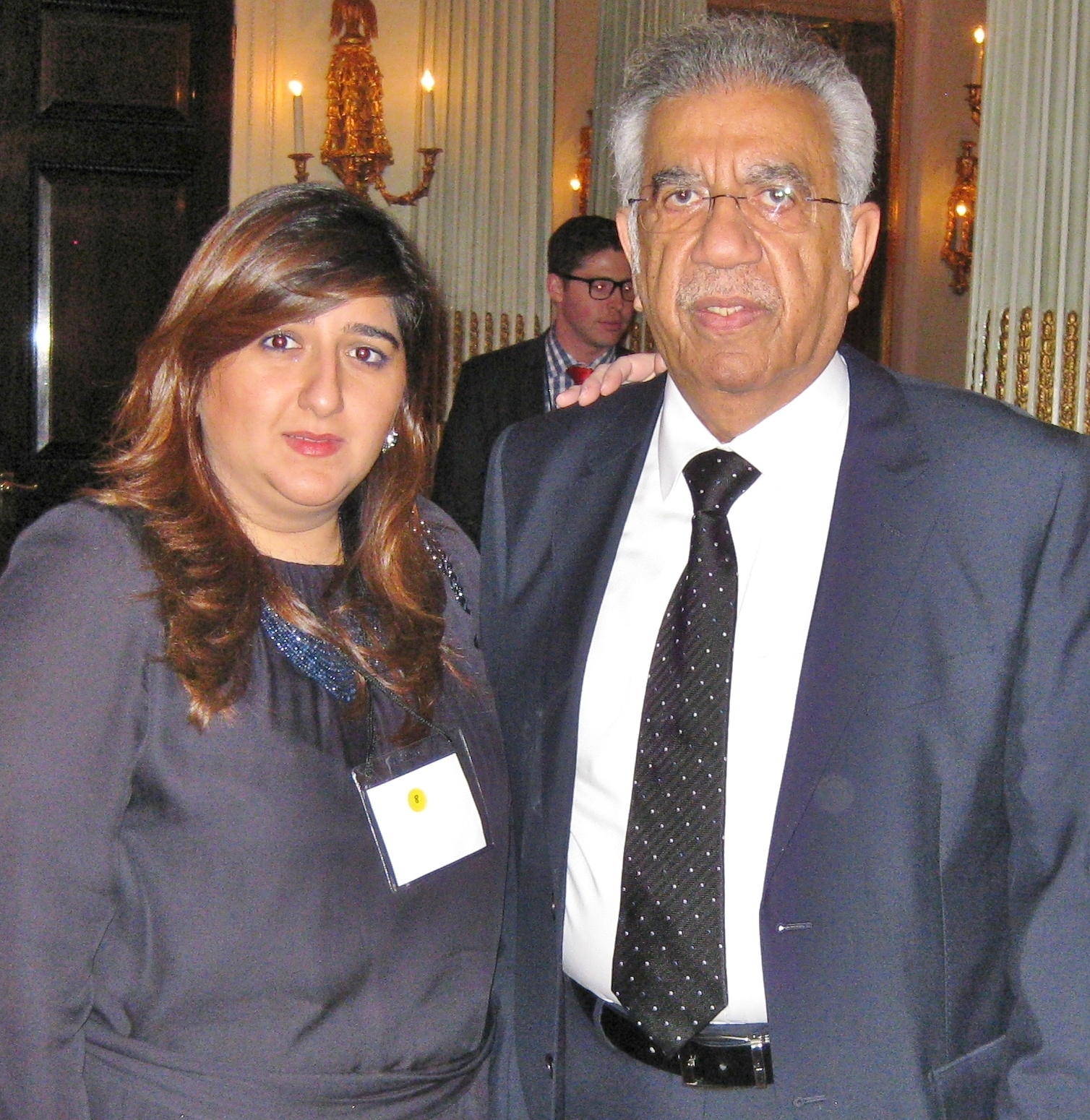
- Sadruddin Hashwani with his daughter, Sarah Hashwani, at an event
- Born: 19 February 1940 (age 86); Karachi, Sind Province, British India
- Education: University of Karachi
- Occupation: Businessman
- Honours: Nishan-e-Imtiaz

Sadruddin Hashwani is a Pakistani hotelier and businessperson who is the chairman of Hashoo Group.

== Biography ==
Sadruddin Hashwani was born in 1940 in Karachi, Sindh, British-pre independent Pakistan into a Khoja Isma'ili family. Hashwanis had migrated with the third Ismaili Imam Agha Khan from Persia in the early 1900s and settled in Lasbela, Balochistan. Hashwani studied at the University of Karachi and in 1960 founded the Hassan Ali Company along with his brother. By 1970s, it had become one of the leading cotton trading company of Pakistan. However, the company was nationalised in 1973. Later Hashwani diverted his resources toward other business ventures, most notably the hotel industry. In 1978, he launched the Holiday Inn hotel in Karachi in 1981 and later in Islamabad. Both of the hotels were converted into Marriott brand in 1990s. In 1985, Hashwani made a successful bid for the majority shares of Pakistan Services Limited, which then owned four Inter-Continental Hotels across Pakistan, the hotels were re-branded as Pearl-Continental Hotels. This acquisition gave him control of the largest chain of five-star hotels in Pakistan. In 2014, Hashwani published his best-selling memoir Truth Always Prevails. In April 2016, he and his son, Murtaza Hashwani, were named in the Panama Papers.

== Bibliography ==
- Hashwani, Sadruddin (2014). Truth Always Prevails

== Awards and recognition ==
- 2019: Nishan-e-Imtiaz
