= Attack on Pakistani ambassador to Sri Lanka =

2006 bombing in Sri Lanka

Attack on Pakistani Ambassador to Sri Lanka
- Date: August 14, 2006
- Target: Bashir Wali Mohamed
- Attack type: Bombing attack
- Weapon: Explosives
- Deaths: 7
- Injuries: 14
- Perpetrator: Liberation Tigers of Tamil Eelam (alleged)
- Motive: Unknown

On August 14, 2006, a convoy carrying the Pakistani High Commissioner to Sri Lanka, Bashir Wali Mohamed, was attacked by a Claymore antipersonnel mine concealed within an auto rickshaw. The High Commissioner escaped unhurt, but seven people (including four Army commandoes) were killed and a further seventeen injured in the blast.

No group claimed responsibility for the attack, but the Sri Lankan government blamed the Liberation Tigers of Tamil Eelam (LTTE). High Commissioner Mohamed claimed that India had carried it out, in order to intimidate Pakistan, which is one of the main suppliers of military equipment to the Sri Lankan government. Pakistan had promised one shipload of the wherewithal every 10 days in coming months.

A Sri Lankan military spokesman said, "Definitely it's an LTTE attack to the Pakistan ambassador's car but they missed and the backup vehicle got caught." The Pakistani ambassador may be a target of the LTTE because Pakistan is a major backer of the Sri Lankan government.

Several LTTE suspects were arrested following the attack.

== Sources ==
- Seven killed in Colombo explosion. BBC News Online. 14 August 2006.
