= Timeline of Pakistani history =

This is a timeline of Pakistani history, comprising important legal and territorial changes and political events in the region of modern-day Pakistan. To read about the background of these events, see History of Pakistan and History of the Islamic Republic of Pakistan.

Paleolithic Period	Middle Paleolithic Period · Upper Paleolithic Period	
Centuries	BCE	35th · 27th · 25th · 19th · 17th · 15th · 13th · 12th · 10th · 7th · 6th · 5th · 4th · 3rd · 2nd · 1st
Centuries	CE	1st · 2nd · 3rd · 4th · 5th · 6th · 7th · 8th · 9th · 10th · 11th · 12th · 13th · 14th · 15th · 16th · 17th · 18th · 19th · 20th · 21st

== Middle Paleolithic ==
Year	Date	Event
300,000 BCE – 100,000 BCE		Flake tools, microliths and other chopping tools have been found in Soan Valley. Most of these tools were composed of the metamorphic quartzite rocks. The stone tool artifacts in this assemblage have been identified as a part of the second inter-pluvial period in Pakistan.

== Upper Paleolithic ==
Year	Date	Event
43,000 BCE		The archaeological site of Riwat 55 dates back to this period. It is modern form of Early Riwat Site. Riwat 55 contains a structure that includes a low wall footing, a pit, and a stone-lined niche, all associated with a freshly flaked stone assemblage that included blades.

== 35th century BCE ==
Year	Date	Event
3500 BCE – 3300 BCE		Mature phases of the Indus Valley Civilization begins. The civilization used an early form of the Indus signs, also called Indus script. Over the course of next 1000–1500 years, inhabitants of the civilization developed new techniques in handicraft (carnelian products and seal carving) and metallurgy (copper, bronze, lead, and tin) had elaborate urban planning, baked brick houses, efficient drainage systems, water supply systems, and clusters of large non-residential buildings. The civilization depended significantly on trade, was the first civilization to use wheeled transport in form of bullock carts, and also used boats.

== 27th century BCE ==
Year	Date	Event
2700 BCE – 2600 BCE		The cities of Harappa and Mohenjo-daro become large metropolises and the civilization expands to over 2,500 cities and settlements across the whole region of modern-day Pakistan, covering a region of around one million square miles, which was larger than the land area of its contemporaries Egypt and Mesopotamia combined, and also had superior urban planning and sewage systems. The civilization began using the mature Indus script for its writing system.

== 25th century BCE ==
Year	Date	Event
2500 BCE – 2000 BCE		The culture, artichetere, technology and educational system of Indus Valley civilization reached at its zenith with Harappa and Kot Diji as main centres. These fluctuations reflect complex and dynamic political, ideological, and economic processes that are an integral part of urban society.

== 19th century BCE ==
Year	Date	Event
1900 BCE – 1300 BCE		Late Harappan Phase (Cemetery H Culture)

== 13th century BCE ==
Year	Date	Event
1300 BCE		Cemetery H culture comes to an end

== 10th century BCE ==
Year	Date	Event
1000 BCE		Middle and Late Vedic period (to 500 BCE)
1000 BCE		Iron Age of Indian subcontinent (including today's Pakistan)

== 6th century BCE ==
Year	Date	Event
600 BCE		Sixteen Maha Janapadas ("Great Realms" or "Great Kingdoms") emerge.
600 BCE		Vedic period ends.
535 BCE – 518 BCE		Achaemenid Emperors launched Persian campaign of Indus Valley and in result parts of modern-day Pakistan became easternmost part of Achaemenid Empire
500 BCE		Gandhara Civilization at first stage of its flourishness.

== 5th century BCE ==
Year	Date	Event
500 BCE – 450 BCE		Persian rule is at its zenith.
500 BCE		Roruka as capital of Sauvira Kingdom become most important trading center of Indian subcontinent, also mentioned in early Buddhist literature.

== 4th century BCE ==
Year	Date	Event
333 BCE		Persian rule in the Pakistan ends after Darius III is defeated by Alexander the Great, who establishes the Macedonian Empire after inheriting the Persian Achaemenid Empire.
326 BCE		Ambhi king of Takshila surrenders to Alexander.
326 BCE		Porus who ruled parts of the Punjab, fought Alexander at the Battle of the Hydaspes River.
325 BCE		During the Mallian Campaign, Alexander was seriously wounded by an arrow in the chest and this became reason of his death.
321 BCE		Mauryan Empire is founded by Chandragupta Maurya.
305 BCE		Chandragupta Maurya defeats Seleucus Nicator of the Seleucid Empire.
304 BCE		Seleucus gives up his territories (Balochistan) to Chandragupta in exchange for 500 elephants. Seleucus offers his daughter in marriage to Chandragupta to seal their friendship.

== 2nd century BCE ==
Year	Date	Event
200 BCE – 150 BCE		Gandhara Civilization (present day Khyber Pakhtunkhwa) flourished in new way by combination of Hellenistic culture and Ancient Indian culture. Taxila became centre of Gandhara Civilization and religion of Buddhism.

== 1st century BCE ==
Year	Date	Event
75 BCE		Arrival of Scythians (Sakas) from Central Asia.
58 BCE		Beginning of Vikram Era.

== 1st century ==
Year	Date	Event
20 AD – 35 AD		Indo-Parthian Kingdom was established and conquered present northern Pakistan.
35 AD		Western Satraps formed.
68 AD		Establishment of the Kushan Empire by Kujula Kadphises.

== 2nd century ==
Year	Date	Event
100 AD or after		Sugar was first produced from sugarcane plants in Punjab.

== 3rd century ==
Year	Date	Event
240 AD		Sri Gupta starts the establishment of Gupta Empire in Indian subcontinent (including present Pakistan).
260 AD		Kushans decline and are dominated by Indo-Sassanians.

== 4th century ==
Year	Date	Event
320 AD		Chandragupta I ascends the throne of Gupta Empire.
320 AD		Kidarite Kingdom came to power in the region of modern-day Pakistan.
335 AD		Samudragupta ascends the Gupta throne and expands the empire.
380 AD		Chandragupta II, Samudragupta's son becomes the Gupta Emperor.

== 5th century ==
Year	Date	Event
450 AD		White Huns (Hephthalites) attacked Gandhara, sacked its cities and burnt down its many monasteries and centres of learning.

== 6th century ==
Year	Date	Event
524 AD		Rai dynasty come to power in the region of Sindh.
554 AD		Collapse of Gupta Empire after the death of Skandagupta.
565 AD		Sassanians and Turks overthrow Huns.

== 7th century ==
Year	Date	Event
601 AD		Rai dynasty reached at its zenith and covered whole of Pakistan and Afghanistan with the capital of Aror, Sindh.
632 AD		Brahman dynasty come into power and Chach of Aror become Maharaja of Sindh.
644 AD		Islam arrived in Indian subcontinent. Rashidun Caliphate defeated Rai dynasty in the Battle of Rasil and Balochistan become easternmost frontier of Rashidun Caliphate.
665 AD		Turk Shahi gained control west of the Indus River, including Gandhara.
671 AD		At the death of Chach of Alor, the Brahmin dynasty reached its zenith and he was succeeded by his brother Chandar of Sindh.
679 AD		Chandar of Sindh died and succeeded by his nephew Raja Dahir, last Hindu Maharaja of Sindh.

== 8th century ==
Year	Date	Event
708 AD – 709 AD		Al-Hajjaj ibn Yusuf sent a force under Ubaidullah ibn Nabhan to raid Debal. Ubaidullah was defeated and slain in battle.
710 AD		Al-Hajjaj dispatched a second, larger force under Budail ibn Tahafe towards Debal. Budail’s army met the forces of Jaisiah (son of Raja Dahir) in a day-long battle. The Umayyad army was routed, and Budail was killed.
712 AD		Muhammad Bin Qasim defeated Raja Dahir and established Umayyad Islamic rule on Sindh and southern Punjab (Multan) on the orders of Al-Hajjaj ibn Yusuf.
747 AD – 751 AD		Umayyad Era finished and Abbasid Era begins. Mansur ibn Jumhur al-Kalbi revolted against Umayyad Dynasty during Abbasid Revolution and after Abbasid victory in revolution, he was confirmed as Abbasid Governor of Sindh.

== 9th century ==
Year	Date	Event
841 AD		Dynastic rule of Habbaris over Sindh begin under suzerainty of Abbasid Caliphate.
870 AD		Hindu Shahis captured Kingdom of Kabul Shahi and expanded their rule in Khyber Pukhtunkhwa and Punjab.
875 AD		Habbari dynasty rule expanded over whole of Sindh, Southern Balochistan and southern Punjab (Multan).

== 10th century ==
Year	Date	Event
965-986		According to the 11th-century Persian scholar Al-Biruni, the Multan Sun Temple was destroyed in that time and its priests were killed by Jalam ibn Shayban, the Ismaili ruler of Multan.
977 AD – 997 AD		Sabuktigin of Ghaznavid dynasty defeated many times Hindu Shahi ruler Jayapala and became ruler of domains east of the Indus River.

== 11th century ==
Year	Date	Event
1001		Mahmud Ghazni defeated Raja Jayapala of Hindu Shahi; after that Jayapala commits suicide.
1021		Mahmud Ghazni defeats Raja Tarnochalpal and Punjab becomes part of Ghaznavid dynasty. In this way whole of Pakistan comes under Muslim rule; Punjab and Khyber Pukhtunkhwa under Ghaznavid Empire, Sindh under Habbari dynasty while Makran (Balochistan) under Caliphate.
1030		Alberuni arrives in Indian subcontinent; death of Mahmud Ghazni.
1058		Muslim Rajput Soomra Dynasty ends the rule of Habbari dynasty and starts to rule on the behave of Abbasid Caliph.
1092		Reign of Zainab Tari begins; first absolute female ruler in the history of South Asia as well as only female who ruled Sindh.

== 12th century ==
Year	Date	Event
1175		Muhammad of Ghurid dynasty defeats Qarmatians rulers of Multan in 1175.
1186		Muhammad Ghori along with Ghiyath al-Din Muhammad ends the rule of Ghaznavid dynasty after having captured Lahore.
1191		"Victory of Prithviraj Chauhan". First Battle of Tarain fought between Muhammad Ghori and Prithviraj III. Ghori is defeated by Prithivi Raj Chauhan III.
1192		"Victory of Muhammad Ghori". Second Battle of Tarain fought between Muhammad Ghori and Prithivi Raj Chauhan III. Chauhan is defeated by Muhammad Ghori.
1193		Qutb al-Din Aibak becomes deputy of Ghurid Empire in Indian subcontinent.

== 13th century ==
Year	Date	Event
1206	15 March	Khukhrains kill Muhammad Ghori during a raid on his camp on the Jhelum River.
1206	12 June	End of Ghurid Era.
1206	25 June	Qutb-ud-din Aibak establishes Delhi Sultanate by becoming first Sultan of the Delhi Sultanate from Mamluk dynasty.
1210	November	Qutb-ud-din Aibak died while playing polo.
1210	December	Aram Shah becomes new Sultan of the Delhi Sultanate.
1211	June	Shams ud-Din Iltutmish defeats Aram Shah in the Battle of Delhi and become third Sultan of the Delhi Sultanate.
1221		Genghis Khan invades Punjab during rule of Iltutmish.
1236	30 April	Iltutmish dies and Rukn ud din Firuz become fourth Sultan of the Delhi Sultanate.
1236	10 October	Razia Sultana abolishes the rule of Rukn ud din Firuz and become fifth Sultan of the Delhi Sultanate.
1240	17 May	Muiz ud din Bahram becomes sixth Sultan of the Delhi Sultanate.
1240	14 October	Murder of Razia Sultan by nobles of Chalisa.
1242	15 May	Murder of Muiz ud din Bahram by army. Ala ud din Masud becomes seventh Sultan of the Delhi Sultanate.
1246	10 June	Nasiruddin Mahmud becomes eighth Sultan of the Delhi Sultanate with the support of Corps of Forty. Balban rules on the behave of Nasiruddin Mahmud as a deputy of empire.
1266	18 February	Nasiruddin Mahmud dies without any hier. Ghiyas ud din Balban becomes ninth Sultan of the Delhi Sultanate.
1285		Delhi Sultanate decisively defeats the army of Mongol Empire at the battle of Beas River.
1287	March	Muiz ud din Qaiqabad becomes tenth Sultan of Delhi Sultanate after the death of his grandfather Ghiyas ud din Balban.
1290	1 February	Murder of Muiz ud din Qaiqabad by Jalaluddin Firuz Khalji, an army commander. Shamsuddin Kayumars becomes eleventh Sultan of the Delhi Sultanate.
1290	13 June	Jalaluddin Firuz Khalji ends the Mamluk Dynasty by murdering Shamsuddin Kayumars. Establishment of Khalji dynasty. Jalaluddin becomes twelfth Sultan of the Delhi Sultanate.
1296	19 July	Alauddin Khalji murders Jalaluddin Firuz Khalji and become thirteen Sultan of the Delhi Sultanate.
1296	October	Allauddin Khalji conquers Multan and eliminates all surviving members of his predecessor Jalaluddin Firuz Khalji.
1297-1298		Mongol Army invades Punjab and Sindh but Delhi Sultanate decisively defeats them and crushes away from Pakistan.
1298		Mongols once again invades Sindh and occupies fort of Sivistan but Delhi Sultanate decisively defeats them.

== 14th century ==
Year	Date	Event
1316	4 January	Alauddin Khalji died due to severe illness.
1316	5 January	Shihabuddin Omar succeeded Alauddin Khalji with the help of Malik Kafur and becomes the 14th Sultan of the Delhi Sultanate.
1316	14 April	After the assassination of Malik Kafur, Qutbuddin Mubarak Shah dethroned his brother Shihabuddin Omar and himself becomes 15th Sultan of the Delhi Sultanate.
1351		Samma Dynasty assumes rule over Sindh
1398		Tamerlane plunders Lahore

== Modern era ==
- 1526 – 1857: Mughal ascendancy (1526–1707),
- 1541 – 1545: Sher Shah Sur builds the Rohtas Fort
- 1586: Yusufzais defeat Akbar at the Karakar pass
- 1701: Kalhoro Dynasty establishes its rule over Sindh
- 1707–1857: Nominal rule by Mughals
- 1739: Nadir Shah of Persia invades Mughal Empire
- 1751–52: Ahmed Shah Abdali annexes Punjab to his kingdom
- 1758–59: Maratha conquest of North-west India
- 1782: The Baloch tribe of Talpur defeats the last Kalhora ruler Mian Abdul Nabi in the battle of Halani
- 12 April 1801— 27 June 1839: Sikhs become dominant force in Punjab, Ranjit Singh rules (1799–1839),
- 1843: British defeat Talpurs in the battle of Miani and annex Sindh
- 29 March 1849: British defeat Sikhs and annex Punjab
- 1 November 1857 The British control most present-day Pakistan region and incorporate it as part of the British Indian Empire.
- 30 December 1906: A new political party All-India Muslim League formed to protect rights of Muslims in British Indian Empire.
- 1909: Muhammad Ali Jinnah was elected to the Legislative Council in 1909
- 1913: Prominent Muslim leader Muhammad Ali Jinnah, acknowledging that Hindu dominant Indian Congress failing to protect Indian Muslim rights, joined the All India Muslim League (AIML). Now he was member of both the political parties, later became leader of the All-India Muslim League and instrumental in the creation of Pakistan.
- 1920: Having disagreement with Gandhi on the issue of Swaraj (self-rule), complete freedom from the British and on using extra-constitutional means, Jinnah resigned from the Congress in 1920
- 1921:
  - MAO College Aligarh upgraded to Aligrah Muslim University
- 29 December 1930: Dr. Muhammad Allama Iqbal, a great Muslim philosopher and poet suggested creation of separate Muslim state in Indian sub-continent to protect Muslim population dominated by Hindu majority.
- 31 May 1935: A strong earthquake with a magnitude of 7.7 jolted Quetta killing over 50,000 people
- 14 August 1947: Pakistan gains independence from the United Kingdom.

== Post-Independence ==
=== 1940s ===
==== 1947 ====
- 3 June: British Government decides to separate British India, into two sovereign Dominions of India and Pakistan.
- 8 July: Constituent Assembly of Pakistan approves the design of Pakistan.
- 26 July: The Gazette of India publishes that the first Constituent Assembly of Pakistan was given shape with 69 members (later on the membership was increased to 79), including one female member.
- 14 August: Pakistan became independent. Quaid-a-Azam took oath as the first Governor General of Pakistan. Liaqat Ali Khan took oath as the first Prime minister of Pakistan. This is followed by the migration of 10 million people, Muslims to Pakistan, Hindus and Sikhs to India .
- 18 August: The Nawab Mohammad Mahabat Khanji III, ruler of the Princely state of Junagadh, and other small states of Bantva, Manavadar and Sardargadh, of the Kathiawar Peninsula despite an overall Hindu majority of the population all acceded to the Dominion of Pakistan, this was influenced by Shah Nawaz Bhutto the Dewan of the state. In response, the Dominion of India claimed that the accession was invalid and demanded a plebiscite . Pakistan agreed, on condition that votes also be held in Hyderabad State and Kashmir and Jammu; India rejected this proposal and also refused to allow the Government of Pakistan any role in administering a plebiscite. It was followed by Indian invasion of junagarh .
- 30 September: Pakistan becomes a member of the UN by a unanimous vote of the Security Council.
- October: 1947 Poonch rebellion against Maharaja of Kashmir ends with rebel victory and Azad Kashmir is formed.
- 3 October:
  - The Nawab (or Ameer) of Bahawalpur, Sadeq Mohammad Khan V, acceded his state to Pakistan.
  - The state of Khairpur also acceded to Pakistan.
- 6 October: The Mehtar of Chitral, Muzaffar-ul-Mulk, acceded his state to Pakistan.
- 22 October: Battle of Muzaffarabad ends in a Pakistani victory and Muzaffarabad is made the capital of Azad Kashmir.
- 27 October: Indian Air troops land in Kashmir as the Maharajah declares accession of Kashmir to India.
- November: Operation Datta Khel is carried out. Gilgit is annexed into Pakistan.
- 3 November:
  - The Wāli of Swat, Miangul Abdul Wadud, acceded his state to Pakistan.
  - Hunza, a small princely state to the north of Jammu and Kashmir acceded to Pakistan.
  - Battle of Badgam ends in an Indian victory.
- 7 November: Battle of Shalateng ends in an Indian victory.
- 18 November: Nagar, a small valley state to the north of Kashmir acceded to Pakistan.
- 27 December: A Douglas C-48C (VT-AUG) of Air India crashed into Korangi Creek en route from Karachi to Bombay, killing all 23 onboard (4 crew and 19 passengers). The crash was found to have been the result of poor visibility during night hours and the instrument lights not working, with serious fault assigned to the captain. The crash was Pakistan's first deadly airliner crash.
- 31 December:'
  - Muhammad Farid Khan, Nawab of Amb, acceded to Pakistan.
  - Khanate of Phulra acceded to Pakistan.

==== 1948 ====
- 1 January: UNO cease-fire orders to operate in Kashmir. War stops accordingly.
- 8 February: The Nawab of Dir, Sir Nawab Shah Jahan Khan acceded to Pakistan.
- 11 February: The outposts at Tsari established by Col Thapa as an external defence and warning for Skardu garrison is defeated in an assault led by Gilgit scouts
- 24 February: Referendum approves Junagadh's accession to India.
- 11 February: Siege of Skardu begins.
- 25 February: Junagadh's Accession to India in effect.
- 17 March:
  - Las Bela's ruler Ghulam Qadir Khan (1920–1988) acceded to Pakistan.
  - Makran acceded to Pakistan
- 27 March: Kalat acceded to Pakistan after the 'strange help' of All India Radio and a period of negotiations and bureaucratic tactics used by Pakistan.
- 1 May: Indo-Pakistani War of 1947, Pakistan enters war on behalf of Kashmir against India.
- 29 June: Operation Eraze is successfully executed by Indian forces.
- 1 July: Quaid-e-Azam inaugurated the State Bank of Pakistan.
- July: First Balochistan conflict Princes Karim Khan and Muhammad Rahim started a rebellion against Pakistan led the Dosht-e Jhalawan (numbering around 1000 militants), they captured Jhalawan and started unconventional attacks on the army.
- 24 July: Battle of Pandu ends in a Pakistani victory.
- 14 August: Siege of Skardu ends in a Pakistani victory.
- 1948: Waziristan rebellion (1948-1954) The Faqir of Ipi supported by Afghanistan took control of North Waziristan's Datta Khel area and declared the establishment of an independent Pashtunistan.
- 11 September: Muhammad Ali Jinnah, the first governor general of Pakistan, passes away.
- 14 September: Khwaja Nazimuddin becomes 2nd Governor-General of Pakistan.
- November: Operation Bison ends in an Indian victory.

==== 1949 ====
- 1 January: United Nations Cease-fire Line established between Pakistan Administered Kashmir (GB & AJ&K) and Indian Administered Kashmir
- 8 February: Azad Kashmir Government shifts its capital to Muzaffarabad.
- 12 March: Objectives Resolution passed by Liaquat Ali Khan.
- June: A Pakistan Air Force warplane inadvertently bombed the Afghan village of Mughalgai while chasing the Pashtunistan separatists who attacked Pakistani positions, this attack killed 23 people.
- 27 July: Pakistan and India sign the Karachi Agreement.

=== 1950s ===
==== 1950 ====
- 8 April: Liaquat and Nehru sign the Liaquat-Nehru Pact.
- 5 June: PC Pak Search Sudhan Operation is launched against Sudhan tribal insurgents.
- 11 July: Pakistan joins the International Monetary Fund and World Bank.
- September 30: Afghan troops cross into the Chaman District, before they are defeated and repulsed in just six days.
- 1950: Princes Karim Khan and Muhammad Rahim surrender themselves to Pakistani authorities ending the First Balochistan conflict.

==== 1951 ====
- 17 January: General Ayub Khan becomes the first non-British Chief of the Army Staff of Pakistan when he replaces General Sir Douglas David Gracey as the chief of army staff.
- 23 February: Rawalpindi conspiracy, Eleven military officers including Major General Akbar Khan and four civilians including prominent poet Faiz Ahmad Faiz and Communist Party of Pakistan leaders Syed Sajjad Zaheer and Muhammad Hussain Ata organise a plot to attempt a coup d'état against the government of Pakistan.
- 9 March: Prime Minister Liaquat Ali Khan announced the foiling of the Rawalpindi conspiracy coup and the conspirators were exposed.
- 16 October: First Prime Minister Liaqat Ali Khan assassinated in Liaqat National Bagh, Rawalpindi.
- 17 October: Finance Minister Malik Ghulam Mohammad (1895–1956) of Muslim League becomes the third Governor General. Governor-General Khawaja Nazimuddin of Muslim League becomes the second Prime Minister.
- 21 August: Pakistan and India agree on the boundary pact between East Bengal and West Bengal.
- 22 August: A 24-hour telegraph telephone service is established between East Pakistan and West Pakistan.
- 24 December: UN Security Council adopts the Anglo-American Resolution on Kashmir urging immediate demilitarization talks between India, Pakistan.

==== 1952 ====
- January 26: At the Dhaka session of the ruling Muslim League party, prime minister Khawaja Nazimuddin declares Urdu the national language of the state of Pakistan.
- February 6: George VI, King of Pakistan, dies at Sandringham House aged 56. Queen Elizabeth II becomes Queen of Pakistan.
- February 21: The first ethnic riots occur in Dhaka, East Pakistan against attempts to make Urdu the national language and lack of representation for Bengalis in central administration. This marks the start of the political struggle for the Bengali language movement.

==== 1953 ====
- February- May: 1953 Lahore riots, Martial law was imposed in Lahore to control the sectarian riots against the Ahmadiyya Muslim Community. This was the first sectarian rioting in the country and the Pakistan Army was called for the first time to control a civil strife. 200 to 2000 Ahmadiyya are killed.
- March 3: CF-CUN, a de Havilland DH-106 Comet 1A of CPAL named Empress of Hawaii, crashed during takeoff from Karachi's Mauripur RAF Station.
- 17 April: 1953 Pakistani constitutional coup, Governor-General Ghulam Mohammad dismissed Pakistani Prime Minister Khawaja Nazimuddin's despite the Prime Minister enjoying the support of the Constituent Assembly. Muhammad Ali Bogra is sworn as the new prime minister.
- 1953–1954 PAF's No. 14 Squadron led an operation from Miramshah airbase and heavily bombarded the Faqir of Ipi's compound in Gurwek ultimately causing the effective end of Waziristan rebellion (1948-1954)

==== 1954 ====
- 2 April: Pakistan forms an alliance with Turkey which, although not including military cooperation, opens the way to the Middle-East alliance due to its allowance of the entry of other nations.
- 19 May: Pakistan and the United States sign a Mutual Defense Assistance Agreement.
- 7 August: Government of Pakistan approves the National Anthem, written by Abu Al-Asar Hafeez Jalandhari and composed by Ahmed G. Chagla.
- 21 September: Constituent Assembly unanimously passes the resolution in favour of Urdu and Bengali as national languages.
- 24 October: Malik Ghulam Muhammad dissolved first constitutional assembly.
- 1954: Mehar Dil Khan Khattak, commander in chief of Pashtunistan armed forces, surrendered to the Pakistani authorities.

==== 1955 ====
- 19 February: Pakistan signs SEA treaty and becomes a part of Southeast Asia Treaty Organization.
- February: 1955 Poonch Uprising, A Civil revolt breaks out in Azad Jammu and Kashmir against the State of Pakistan, provoked largely by the dismissal of Sardar Ibrahim Khan
- 1955: Constitutional crisis, Mohammad Ali Bogra removed, new assembly, new cabinet.
- 7 August: PM Mohammad Ali Bogra resigns after the election of Chaudhri Mohammad Ali.
- 6 October: Governor-General Ghulam Mohammad's resignation is succeeded by Iskander Mirza.
- September 23: Baghdad Pact treaty among Iraq, Turkey, the U.K., Pakistan, and Iran is ratified by Pakistan.
- September 30: One Unit Scheme is implemented, provinces in West Pakistan are abolished.

==== 1956 ====
- 1956: The Constituent Assembly promulgates first indigenous constitution.
- 1956: Constituent Assembly decides the country shall be a Federal Republic known as Islamic Republic of Pakistan
- March 23: Iskander Mirza becomes the first President of Pakistan.
- September: Huseyn Shaheed Suhrawardy becomes Prime Minister of Pakistan.
- 20 September: Treaty of Baral is signed with Sudhan insurgents ending the PC Pak Search Sudhan Operation.

==== 1957 ====
- October: Ibrahim Ismail Chundrigar replaces Huseyn Shaheed Suhrawardy as Prime Minister.
- 16 December: Malik Firoz Khan Noon is sworn in as seventh Prime Minister of Pakistan.

==== 1958 ====
- June 9: Gen Muhammad Ayub Khan's term as the Commander-in-Chief of the Pakistan Army extended by PM Feroz Khan Noon on request of President Mirza
- June 25: Presidential rule imposed in East Pakistan
- August: Second Balochistan conflict begins when the palace guards of Ahmad of Kalat attack deputy commissioner. It is followed by Pakistan army's bombardment and assault on Kalat palace and arrest of Ahmad of Kalat. Protests against the government break out in Balochistan.
- August 7: 1958 East Pakistan-India Border Clashes, Armed skirmishes between East Pakistan and India took place between troops of the East Pakistan Rifles (EPR) and the Indian Army in the small village of Lakshmipur, located in Sylhet District
- October 6: All powers of Ahmad of Kalat are stripped off and he is jailed in Lahore.
- October 7: Iskander Mirza abrogates the constitution and enforces martial law. General Ayub Khan is named Chief Martial Law Administrator (CMLA). Political parties are banned.
- October 27: Ayub and his Cabinet takes oaths. In a dramatic turn of events late night, President Iskander Mirza resigned, giving over his office to Gen Ayub Khan. Ayub now becomes the country's 2nd President. He remained Prime Minister for around 13 hours only, thus becoming the shortest-serving Premier in the history of the country so far.

==== 1958 ====
- 1958: Nauroz Khan launches an insurgency against Pakistan government for abolishment of One Unit Scheme and release of Ahmad of Kalat. Battles erupt between militants and Pakistan army.
- November 27: Iskander Mirza is exiled to London
- December 8: Gawadar, formerly a fief of the Sultan of Oman, is handed over to Pakistan after its purchase.

==== 1959 ====
- 10 April: 1959 Canberra shootdown, an English Electric Canberra of the Indian Air Force was shot down by an F-86F Sabre of the Pakistan Air Force over Rawat
- 18 April: The government takes over dailies The Pakistan Times, Imroze and weekly Lail-o-Nihar.
- 26 October: Ayub Khan announces his system of 80,000 Basic Democrats, who would further form the electoral college for the elections of the President and the members of the Central and Provisional Legislature.
- 1959: Dir campaign, a Pakistan backed civilian revolt against the Nawab of Dir is crushed.

=== 1960s ===
==== 1960 ====
- 1960: Ayub Khan becomes first elected president.
- 1960: Nauroz Khan and his followers surrender to Pakistani authorities concluding the Second Balochistan conflict.
- 1 May: The U-2 Incident begins when an American U-2 spy plane, piloted by Francis Gary Powers, is shot down by Soviet Air Defence Forces. The clandestine flight had taken off from the U.S. base at Badaber near Peshawar, Pakistan.
- 1 August: Islamabad is declared as the principal seat of the Government of Pakistan.
- 19 September: Pakistan and India sign the Indus Waters Treaty, brokered by the World Bank.
- September: Bajaur Campaign, Afghan troops and irregulars invade Bajaur district but they are repulsed by Pakistani tribesmen and airforce.
- September: Dir campaign, Afghan troops and irregulars enter into Dir to support Nawab of Dir against a Pakistan backed revolt. Afghan forces are repulsed and 200 soldiers of Nawab are killed.
- 10 October: A severe cyclone hits Noakhali and Chittagong districts of East Pakistan, killing more than 5,000 people.
- 31 October: A cyclone more powerful than that which hit on 10 October sweeps across East Pakistan, killing 14,174 people.
- October: Dir campaign, Pakistani special forces carry out a coup against Nawab Jahan khan of Dir, he is arrested and exiled. A constitutional government is established.

==== 1961 ====
- 6 May 1961: Constitution Commission, appointed by President Ayub Khan, presents its report, specifying pinpoints the failures of parliamentary government in Pakistan.

==== 1962 ====
- April: Elections for the National and provincial assembly were held on the basis of Basic Democracies.
- 8 June: 1962 Constitution is promulgated. National Assembly elected. Ayub Khan takes oath of first President of Pakistan under new constitution.
- July: the National Assembly passes the Political Parties Act, legalizing the formation of political parties.

==== 1963 ====
- 1963: Start of Third Balochistan conflict by Baloch militants to persuade the government to share revenue form Sui gas fields with the tribal leaders and lifting of One Unit Scheme.

==== 1964 ====
- 2 January: Fatima Jinnah lost the presidential elections, Ayub completes the second term.
- 2 January: Anti-Hindu riots begin in Khulna, East Pakistan. They and reciprocal riots in Calcutta would fuel waves of communal violence on either side of the border over the next few months killing thousands.
- 1 June: Pakistan acquires from the United States its first submarine, the PNS Ghazi
- 22 July: The heads of state of Iran, Pakistan and Turkey issue a joint communique from Istanbul, establishing the Regional Cooperation for Development (RCD).
- 26 November: The country's first television station goes on air in Lahore, operated on a pilot basis by NEC.

==== 1965 ====
- 9 April: Pakistan starts Operation Desert Hawk in the Rann of Kutch
- 30 July: Operation Desert Hawk ends in a Pakistani victory.
- August: Operation Gibraltar is initiated by Pakistan but it fails to complete its objective of inciting a rebellion.
- 28 August: Battle of Haji Pir pass ends in an Indian victory
- 1 September: Pakistan initiates Operation Grand Slam capturing more than 490 square kilometres of territory from Kashmir including the town of Chumb
- 6 September: Second Full-scale war erupts between Pakistan and India over Kashmir.
- 7-8 September: Operation Dwarka is carried out with no losses on either side
- 10 September: Battle of Asal Uttar ends in an Indian victory
- 11 September:
  - Battle of Burki ends in an Indian victory
  - Battle of Ichogil Bund ends in a Pakistani victory
- 12 September: Pakistan successfully defends Lahore in the Battle of Lahore
- 19 September:
  - Battle of Chawinda concludes
  - Gujarat Beechcraft incident takes place and an Indian civilian aircraft is shot down by Pakistan air force.
- 22 September: Battle of Dograi ends in an Indian victory
- 22-23 September: Battle of Phillora ends in an Indian victory
- 23 September: Indo-Pakistani air war of 1965 ends with Pakistan inflicting three times more losses to Indian forces (neutral claim)
- 23 September: A ceasefire comes into action and Indo-Pakistani war of 1965 ends.

==== 1966 ====
- 10 January: Pakistan and India sign the Tashkent Declaration to end hostilities.
- 5 February: Sheikh Mujibur Rahman, general secretary of the East Pakistan Awami League, announces the Six Point Program calling for limiting the federal government to defence and foreign affairs.

==== 1967 ====
- 1 May: Five opposition parties: the National Democratic Front, Council Muslim League, Jamaat-e-Islami, Pakistan Awami League, and Nizam-e-Islam Party, form an alliance called the Pakistan Democratic Movement.
- 6 November: Pakistan is elected to the UN Security Council for a two-year term.
- 30 November: Pakistan Peoples Party founded by Zulfikar Ali Bhutto in Lahore.

==== 1968 ====
- 7 November: Start of 1968–69 Pakistan revolution

==== 1969 ====
- 25 March: Ayub Khan resigns; Yahya Khan declares martial law and assumes presidency.
- 1969: End of Third Balochistan conflict, negotiations between Yahya Khan and militants led to ceasefire and general amnesty.
- 27 November - 6 December: Pakistan sends pilots to help Saudi Arabia against South Yemen in the Al-Wadiah War.

=== 1970s ===
==== 1970 ====
- 6 August: A Pakistan International Airlines F27 enters a steep dive and crashes about three minutes after a night takeoff from Rawalpindi in poor weather. All four crew members and 26 passengers are killed.
- 12 November: East Pakistan: The Bhola cyclone devastates East Pakistan and Eastern India, resulting in extreme loss of life. 300,000 to 500,000 people are killed.
- 7 December: 1970 Pakistani general election were held on 7 December 1970, although the polls in East Pakistan, originally scheduled for October, were delayed by disastrous floods and rescheduled for later in December and January 1971.
- 30 December: A Pakistan International Airlines F27 crashes about 300 feet (91 meters) short of the Shamshernagar Airport runway. Seven of the 31 passengers are killed.

==== 1971 ====
- 1 March: General Yahya Khan calls off the session of National Council to be held on 3 March in a radio address.
- 7 March: Sheikh Mujibur Rahman announces informal independence of Bangladesh
- 9 March: Workers of Chittagong port refuse to unload weapons from the ship 'Swat'.
- 16 March: Yahya Khan starts negotiation with Sheikh Mujibur Rahman.
- 19 March: Nearly 200 people are injured at Jaydevpur during clashes between protesters and the Pakistan Army.
- 24 March: The Pakistan Army opens fire on Bengali protesters in Syedpur and Rangpur. About 150 people are killed.
- 25-26 March: Pakistan Army starts crackdown on Bengali populace in the form of Operation Searchlight, starting Bangladesh liberation war.
- 26 March 1971: Sheikh Mujibur Rahman is arrested by the Pakistani army.
- 27 March: Santahar massacre committed by the Mukhti Bahini
- 31 March: Kushtia resistance begins.
- 2 April: Jinjira massacre.
- 10 April: A provisional Bangladesh government-in-exile is formed.
- 18 April: Battle of Daruin, Comilla and Battle of Rangamati-Mahalchari waterway, take place in Chittagong Hill Tracts.
- 25 April: Operation Jackpot started by Mukti Bahini
- 5 May: Gopalpur massacre.
- 15 May: Indian army starts aiding Mukti Bahini.
- 20 May: The Chuknagar massacre takes place at Khulna where the Pakistan army kills nearly 10 thousand people
- 16 August: Operation Jackpot, Bangladesh naval commando operation concludes.
- 20 August: Flight Lieutenant Matiur Rahman's attempt to defect by hijacking a fighter foiled by Rashid Minhas.
- 30 August: Pakistan Army starts crackdown on Dhaka guerrillas.
- 5 September: Battle of Goalhati.
- 13 October: Dhaka guerrillas kill Abdul Monem Khan, governor of East Pakistan.
- 28 October-3 November: Battle of Dhalai
- 31 October-3 November: Battle of Dhalai: Allied attack from Tripura into East Pakistan to stop Pakistani cross-border shelling.
- 16 November: Battle of Ajmiriganj, an 18-hour encounter between Mukti Bahini and Pakistan army.
- 14 November-4 December: Battle of Kamalpur
- 20-21 November: Battle of Garibpur.
- 22 November-16 December: Battle of Hilli.
- 3 December: Bangladesh Air Force destroys Pakistani oil depots.
- 3 December: Pakistani pre-emptive airstrikes in India. As a result, India declares war against Pakistan starting Indo-Pakistani war of 1971.
- 3-6 December: Battle of Chamb; Pakistan attacks and takes over part of southern Kashmir from India.
- 4 December: Battle of Longewala; India stops a Pakistani invasion directed at Jaisalmer.
- 4-5 December: Battle of Gazipur in which Indian Army and Mukti Bahini captured Gazipur.
- 5 December: Battle of Basantar; India captures the Shakargarh Salient.
- 7-16 December: Battle of Sylhet.
- 8 December: Operation Python, Indian naval attacks on Karachi.
- 9 December:
  - Battle of Kushtia
  - Meghna Heli Bridge captured from Pakistan
- 10 December: Two Bangladeshi ships sunk mistakenly by an Indian air attack.
- 11 December:
  - Tangail Airdrop
  - USS Enterprise is deployed by the US Navy in the Bay of Bengal to intimidate the Indian Navy.
- 13 December 1971: Soviet Navy deploys a group of warships to counter Enterprise. The Enterprise moves towards Southeast Asia, averting a confrontation.
- 14 December: Selective genocide of Bengali nationalist intellectuals.
- 16 December: End of the Bangladesh Liberation War. Mitro Bahini takes Dhaka. Approximately 93,000 troops of Pakistan Armed Forces surrenders to Mitro Bahini represented by Jagjit Singh Aurora of the Indian Army faction of the military coalition.
- 20 December: Yahya Khan resigns.

==== 1972 ====
- 1972: Zulfiqar Ali Bhutto becomes president.
- 20 January: Zulfikar Ali Bhutto publicly announces that Pakistan will immediately begin a nuclear weapons programme.
- January: Pakistan temporarily withdraws from the Commonwealth of Nations in protest at the international recognition of Bangladesh.
- 14 March: New education policy enforced. Free education in all private and public schools.
- 21 April: Martial Law lifted; constitutional rule is restored in the country. Hamoodur Rahman is sworn in as Chief Justice of Pakistan.
- 6 October: Karachi labour unrest of 1972, workers occupied factories
- 18 October: Karachi labour unrest of 1972 The police and military used bulldozers to break factory walls and fired upon workers killing 100.
- 7 July: 1972 Language violence in Sindh kills 47 people.

==== 1973 ====
- 10 February: 1973 raid on the Iraqi embassy in Pakistan, Iraqi weapons for Baloch insurgents are discovered.
- February: Provincial government in Balochistan is dismissed.
- February: Start of the 1970s operation in Balochistan.
- 10 April: 1973 Constitution of Pakistan enacted by the National Assembly.
- 17 July: 1973 Afghan coup d'état strains relations between Pakistan and Afghanistan.
- 11 August: Chaudhry Fazal Ilahi is elected as president.
- 14 August: Zulfiqar Ali Bhutto becomes prime minister. Constitution of Pakistan 1973 promulgated.
- 1973: 1973 Pakistan coup attempt is foiled.

==== 1974 ====
- 1974: Pakistan recognised Bangladesh.
- 27 May: 1974 Anti-Ahmadiyya riots result in the death of 27 Ahmadiyyas and declaration of Ahmadiyyas as non Muslim.
- September: Largest battle between Pakistani troops and Baloch insurgents.

==== 1975 ====
- 22 July 1975: Pakistan backed 1975 Laghman uprising is crushed by Afghan government.

==== 1976 ====
- 1976: Pakistan begins diplomatic relations with Bangladesh.
- 3-10 September: 1976 Dir rebellion is crushed, 300 people are killed.
- 1976: Baloch insurgents, due to lack of ammunition start fleeing.

==== 1977 ====
- 10 January: Nine opposition parties form joint election forum, Pakistan National Alliance (PNA).
- 7 March: 1977 Pakistani general election
- 7 March- July: 1977 Pakistan uprising occurs in response to the alleged rigging in elections. Military is deployed to crush the uprising. More than 150 are killed.
- 5 July: Operation Fair Play, General Muhammad Zia ul-Haq overthrows prime minister Zulfiqar Ali Bhutto and declares martial law.
- July: General Rahimuddin Khan takes over Balochistan. General amnesty is declared. Fourth Balochistan conflict ends with about 25,000 deaths.

==== 1978 ====
- 14 March Sardar Mohammad Daoud Khan visits Islamabad.
- 11 June: Altaf Hussain founded the All Pakistan Muhajir Student Organization (APMSO) in Karachi University starting the First MQM insurrection.
- January 2: 1978 massacre at Multan Colony Textile Mills, On the orders of Muhammad Zia-ul-Haq, paramilitary forces opened fire on peaceful protesting workers in Multan killing 133-900 (official toll is 22).
- 12 September Zia-ul-Haq visits Noor Muhammad Tarakai, marxist leader of Afghanistan in Kabul.
- 16 September: General Muhammad Zia ul-Haq becomes Pakistan's sixth president.
- 22 September: Saur Revolution takes place and further strains Pakistan Afghanistan relations.

==== 1979 ====
- 1979: The military ruler Zia Ul-Haq enacts the Hudood Ordinances.
- 4 April: Zulfiqar Ali Bhutto hanged.
- 3 July: ISI, CIA and GIP Start Operation Cyclone to aid Mujahideen forces in Afghanistan.
- 3 November: 1979 U.S. embassy burning in Islamabad by Jamaat E Islami on false accusations of US involvement in Grand Mosque seizure by Khomeini.
- 24 December: Soviet–Afghan War begins after Soviet deployment.

=== 1980s ===
==== 1980 ====
- 1980: The United States pledges military assistance to Pakistan following Soviet intervention in Afghanistan.
- 1 March: Pakistan Soviet air confrontations, A Soviet Ilyushin Il-26 entered Pakistani airspace and was intercepted by PAF Squadron 15 but the pilots were instructed not to engage.
- 23 March: 1980 Pakistan coup attempt, a plot by Maj. Gen. Tajammul Hussain Malik to assassinate Zia-ul-Haq on Pakistan Day on March 23, 1980, was exposed and thwarted.
- 26 May: Establishment of Federal Shariat Court is announced.

==== 1981 ====
- 2 March: Pakistan International Airlines Flight 326 is hijacked by armed men belonging to Al-Zulfiqar.
- 23 March: Provisional constitutional order enforced, replacing the 1973 constitution.

==== 1982 ====
- 1982: Pakistan builds its first workable nuclear device.

==== 1983 ====
- 12 February: 1983 women's march, Lahore, 50 women are arrested
- August–September: Movement for the Restoration of Democracy arranges nationwide protests against Zia ul Haq.
- 1983: The first F-16 supplied by the US to Pakistan Air Force (PAF).
- 11 March: Kirana-I, Pakistan conduct cold test of a nuclear device, proving the state as one of recognized nuclear weapons state. The test was not announced publicly until 1998.
- December 31: The 7.2 mb Hindu Kush earthquake affects northern Afghanistan and Pakistan with a maximum Mercalli intensity of VII (Very strong), killing 12–26 and injuring 60–483.

==== 1984 ====
- 18 March: Azeem Ahmed Tariq & Altaf Hussain founded the MQM (Muhajir Qaumi Movement) in Karachi and Hyderabad.
- 1984: 1984 Pakistan coup attempt, second coup attempt against Zia ul Haq is thwarted by Inter services intelligence.
- April: Operation Meghdoot, Start of Siachen conflict, The Indian Army captures Siachen in a military raid.

==== 1985 ====
- 28 February: General elections held; Muhammad Khan Junejo becomes prime minister.
- 26–27 April: Badaber uprising by Soviet and Afghan POWs near Peshawar is crushed.
- 1985: KHAD-KGB campaign in Pakistan is started by KGB and KHAD, Hathora murders in Karachi begin
- 1985: Anti Pashtun violence in Karachi kills more than 100.
- August: Mujahideen under the command of Pakistani ISI brigadier general Mohammad Yousuf start Raids inside Soviet union
- 31 December: Martial Law is lifted, amended 1973 Constitution revived.

==== 1986 ====
- February: Pakistan Soviet air confrontations, PAF fighters intercepted a couple of Mig-21s.
- 1986:Zulfiqar Ali Bhutto's daughter Benazir returns from exile to lead the Pakistan Peoples Party (PPP) in a campaign for fresh elections.
- April: During the Second Battle of Zhawar, an Afghan aerial assault group accidentally landed inside Pakistan. 120 personnel and 6 Mi-8 were captured by Pakistani forces.
- 29 April: Pakistan Soviet air confrontations, the Afghan Air Force claimed to have shot down a Pakistani Air Force F-16.
- 17 May: Pakistan Soviet air confrontations, Pakistan Air Force claimed to have destroyed two Su-22M3K belonging to Democratic Republic of Afghanistan Air Force, DRAAF confirmed loss of one.
- 5 September: Pan Am Flight 73, with 358 people on board, is hijacked at Karachi International Airport by four Abu Nidal terrorists.
- 14 December: Qasba Aligarh massacre, violence against Muhajirs by newly settled Pashtuns from KPK, Pakistan and Afghanistan.

==== 1987 ====
- 16 April: Pakistan Soviet air confrontations, PAF shot down an Afghan Su-22.
- 30 March: Pakistan Soviet air confrontations PAF shot down a Soviet An-26.
- June–July: Operation Rajiv ends in an Indian victory.
- 14 July: 1987 Karachi car bombing killed 72 and wounded 250.
- 1987: In a clash with Soviet aircraft one PAF F-16 was due to friendly fire.
- September: In aerial dogfights one Soviet Mig-23 is damaged and two are allegedly destroyed.
- September: Operation Vajrasakti / Qaidat, two expeditions by Pakistani and Indian forces in siachen. Combat results in an Indian victory.
- September 20 At least 5 people were killed and 16 injured when a bomb exploded in a bus station in Rawalpindi.
- 1987: KHAD-KGB campaign in Pakistan, Bomb blast on the US consulate in Peshawar killed 30.

==== 1988 ====
- 20 January: Prominent Pashtun leader Khan Abdul Ghaffar Khan dies in Peshawar.
- 10 April: Ojhri Camp disaster, Army ammunition blown up in Ojhri camp, Rawalpindi; more than 100 people die.
- 29 May: Zia dismisses Junejo's government;
- 8 August: Pakistan Soviet air confrontations, Colonel Alexander Rutskoy's Sukhoi Su-25 was shot down by PAF.
- 14 August: Pakistan signs the Geneva Accords (1988) with Afghanistan under the mediation of United States and Soviet union respectively.
- 17 August: General Zia-ul-Haq is killed in a plane crash near Bahawalpur.
- 30 September: 1988 Hyderabad massacre
- 31 September: Anti-Sindhi violence kills more than 200 Sindhis in Karachi and Hyderabad .
- 3 November: Pakistan Soviet air confrontations, An Afghan Su-24 was shot down by PAF.
- 16 November: New elections held; Benazir Bhutto becomes prime minister after 1988 Pakistani general election
- 1988: ISI personnel start Operation Midnight Jackal against Benazir Bhutto.
- December 10: An Antonov An-26 of Ariana Afghan Airlines was shot down in Pakistani territory by Pakistani fighters on a passenger flight from Khost to Kabul, killing all 25 occupants. Pakistan denied the shooting.

==== 1989 ====
- 1989: Pakistan returns to its status as a Commonwealth republic
- 15 February: Soviet withdrawal from Afghanistan is completed and Soviet-Afghan War ends.
- 15 February: First Afghan Civil War starts.
- February–April: Operation Chumik/Operation Ibex, two expeditions by Pakistani and Indian forces result in the demilitarization of Chumik Glacier.
- 5 March: Battle of Jalalabad (1989) starts and 5000 Pakistani troops enter into Afghanistan.
- 6 April: Afghan SCUD attacks in Pakistan begin.
- 4 May: Afghan SCUD attacks in Pakistan, second strike takes place. 3 people are killed.
- 22 May: third Afghan SCUD attacks in Pakistan.
- 23-26 June: Three Afghan SCUD attacks in Pakistan.
- 31 June: Battle of Jalalabad (1989) commences with an Afghan government victory. ISI chief Hamid Gul is sacked by Pakistani authorities.
- 1989: Operation Midnight Jackal by ISI personnel is exposed and they are trialed.
- 3 August: Seventh Afghan SCUD attacks in Pakistan.
- 15 August: Eighth Afghan SCUD attacks in Pakistan.
- 1 October: Ninth Afghan SCUD attacks in Pakistan.
- 27 October: Tenth Afghan SCUD attacks in Pakistan.

=== 1990s ===
==== 1990 ====
- 4 January: Sukkur rail disaster, more than 300 people are killed
- 10 January: 11th Afghan SCUD attacks in Pakistan
- 1990: Clashes between Muhajirs and Sindhis lead to the death of 190 civilians
- 7 May: 21 people were killed and 30 injured in a train bombing near Lahore.
- 18 May: — 10 people were killed and 54 wounded in a bomb blast in Lahore.
- 26-27 May: Pucca Qila Massacre, about 200 muhajirs are killed massacre is stopped by military intervention.
- 14 June: 12th Afghan SCUD attacks in Pakistan
- 16 July: 43 people were killed and 110 injured in 7 bomb explosions in Hyderabad, Sindh.
- 26 June: 13th Afghan SCUD attacks in Pakistan
- 2 August: Gulf War starts, Pakistan joins the coalition to protect Kuwait.
- 6 August: President Ghulam Ishaq Khan dismisses Benazir Bhutto government; Mian Nawaz Sharif becomes the next prime minister
- 13 September: 14th Afghan SCUD attacks in Pakistan
- 24 October: 1990 Pakistani general election
- 20 November: 15th Afghan SCUD attacks in Pakistan
- 28 November: Last Afghan SCUD attacks in Pakistan
- 1990: Mehrangate is exposed.

==== 1991 ====
- 1991: Prime Minister Nawaz Sharif begins economic liberalisation programme.
- 16 May: Islamic Shariah law formally incorporated into legal code.
- December: A train travelling from Karachi to Lahore hits a parked freight train at Ghotki, killing over 100 of the 800 passengers.

==== 1992 ====
- 28 April: Second Afghan Civil War starts with a heavy Pakistani involvement.
- 20 May: A 6.0 magnitude earthquake affects northern Pakistan causing moderate damage, killing 36 and injuring 100.
- 28 July – 3 August: Siachen conflict, Indian Army launched Operation Trishul Shakti, one Pakistani helicopter is shot down.
- 19 June: Pakistan Army started Operation Clean-up ending the MQM insurrection (1978-1992).
- 8 September: 1992 India–Pakistan floods, almost 1,000 people die and 3 million are evacuated due to flooding in Punjab province caused by torrential rains swelling the Indus river and its tributaries, a thousand more are also killed in the Kashmir region.
- 28 September: Pakistan International Airlines Flight 268, an Airbus A300B4-203, crashes into the southern slope of the Chure Hills on approach to Tribhuvan International Airport in Kathmandu, Nepal, killing all 167 passengers and crew.
- 5 December: Pakistan joins Unified Task Force and participates in Operation Restore Hope.
- 1992: Pakistan becomes fourth largest troop contributor to the United Nations Protection Force in Bosnia.
- 1992: Inter-Services Intelligence activities in Bosnia and Herzegovina begin to support Bosniaks against Serbs.

==== 1993 ====
- 7 March: Political groups from Afghanistan sign the Islamabad Accord in Pakistan, forming a coalition until elections can be held.
- 2 April: The Pakistan government vows to crack down on Arab militants.
- 8 April: After a crack down on illegal immigrants, hundreds of Arab nationals are arrested on suspected links to Islamic militants.
- 5 June: June 1993 attack on Pakistani military in Somalia, 25 Pakistani troops are massacred by SNA.
- 13 June: June 1993 UN killings of Somali protestors, In response to attack on Pakistani military, Pakistani troops open fire on Somali civilians killing 20.
- 16 June: Bosnian Muslim refugees leave Croatia for Pakistan.
- 18 July: President Ghulam Ishaq Khan and Prime Minister Nawaz Sharif both resign under pressure from military. Benazir Bhutto becomes prime minister for the second time.
- August–October: Pakistan participates in Operation Gothic Serpent but coalition is forced to withdraw.
- 3-4 October: Pakistan participates in Battle of Mogadishu (1993) but coalition is forced to withdraw.

==== 1994 ====
- May–June: Start of MQM insurrection (1994-present), 750 people are killed in riots
- 1 November: Malakand insurrection (1994-1995) by Islamist militants begins.
- 1994: MQM insurrection (1994-present), General Naseerullah Babar started an operation against MQM.

==== 1995 ====
- 9 January – 3 March 1995: Pakistan navy participates in Operation United Shield in Somalia.
- May: Siachen conflict, Battle of Tyakshi Post ends in an Indian victory.
- 19 June: Malakand insurrection (1994-1995) ends after implementation of Sharia law in Malakand Division.
- July: The Pakistani embassy in Kabul is attacked.
- October: 1995 Pakistani coup attempt is foiled and coup plotters are arrested.
- 19 November: Attack on the Egyptian Embassy in Pakistan kills 13.
- 1995: As a part of Second MQM insurrection, more than 2000 people are killed in 1995
- 21 December: — 1995 Peshawar bombing: At least 25 people were killed and 100 wounded.

==== 1996 ====
- 28 April: Bhai Pheru bus bombing: 50 people were killed and 26 injured
- 22 July: A briefcase bomb killed 9 and wounded 20 people in the old terminal of Lahore International Airport
- 5 November: President Farooq Leghari dismisses Bhutto government.
- 1996: Second operation against MQM is called off.

==== 1997 ====
- 3 February: 1997 Pakistani general election, Nawaz Sharif becomes prime minister for the second time.
- 2 December: Pakistan's president, Farooq Leghari, resigns. Wasim Sajjad becomes interim president for the second time.

==== 1998 ====
- March 10: — On the Tuesday morning, a bomb blast occurred on Walton railway station, in a Lahore-bound train killed at least 10 and wounding more than 80 people.
- May 28: The first nuclear test — Codename Chagai-I was conducted and supervised by the PAEC at Ras Koh Chaghi, Baluchistan.
- May 30: The second nuclear test Chagai-II was conducted and supervised by the PAEC.
- 8 June: — 23 people were killed as a bomb exploded on moving Khyber Mail (Train) heading towards Peshawar, on Tando Masti Khan railway station.
- 1998: MQM insurrection (1994-present), Governor rule was imposed by Nawaz Sharif in the Sindh province and military operation was initiated against MQM due to Hakeem Saeed's assassination

==== 1999 ====
- 1999: Pakistan tests its Ghauri II missile.
- 20 May: massive hurricane strikes Sindh killing 6000.
- 3 May: Start of Kargil war A Pakistani intrusion in the Kargil district is reported by local shepherds.
- 5 May: Indian Army patrols are sent out in response to earlier reports; 5 Indian soldiers are captured and subsequently killed.
- 9 May: Heavy shelling by the Pakistan Army damages Indian ammunition dumps in Kargil.
- 10 May: Multiple infiltrations across the LoC are confirmed in Dras, Kaksar, and Mushkoh sectors.
- 26 May: The Indian Air Force (IAF) begins airstrikes against suspected infiltrator positions.
- 27 May: One IAF MiG-21 and one MiG-27 are shot down by Pakistan Army's Air Defence Corps;
- 28 May: One IAF Mi-17 is shot down by Pakistani forces; four crew members are killed.
- 1 June: The Pakistan Army begins shelling operations on India's National Highway 1 .
- 6 June: The Indian Army begins a major offensive in Kargil.
- 9 June: Indian troops re-capture two key positions in the Batalik sector.
- 11 June: India releases intercepts of conversations between Pakistani COAS Gen. Pervez Musharraf and CGS Lt. Gen. Aziz Khan as proof of the Pakistan Army's involvement in the Kargil war.
- 13 June: Battle of Tololing ends in Indian victory.
- 15 June: United States President Bill Clinton forces then Prime Minister of Pakistan, Nawaz Sharif to immediately pull all Pakistani troops and irregulars out from Kargil.
- 20 June: Battle of point 5140 ends in an Indian victory.
- 29 June: Pakistani forces begin their retreat and the Indian Army advances towards Tiger Hill.
- June: Siachen conflict, Indian Army captured pt 5770 from Pakistan troops.
- 4 July: Battle of Tiger Hill ends in an Indian victory.
- 5 July: Nawaz Sharif officially announces the Pakistan Army's withdrawal from Kargil following a meeting with President Clinton.
- 7 July: Battle of Point 4875 ends in an Indian victory.
- 11 July: Pakistani forces disengage from the region; India retakes key peak points in Batalik.
- 26 July: Kargil war officially comes to an end. Indian Army announces the complete withdrawal of Pakistani irregular and regular forces.
- 10 August: 1999 Pakistan Breguet 1150 Atlantic shootdown, a Breguet Atlantic maritime patrol aircraft of the Pakistan Naval Air Arm was shot down by a MiG-21 fighter of the Indian Air Force
- 11 August: Pakistani forces fire a missile on an Indian helicopter carrying journalists.
- 12 October: Prime Minister Nawaz Sharif overthrown in military coup led by General Pervez Musharraf.

=== 2000s ===
==== 2000 ====
- April: After military takeover, Former Prime Minister Nawaz Sharif is sentenced to life imprisonment
- 12 May: Supreme Court validated the October 1999 coup and granted General Pervez Musharraf executive and legislative authority for three years.
- December: Nawaz Sharif goes into exile to Saudi Arabia

==== 2001 ====
- 20 June: General Pervez Musharraf dismissed the president and named himself to the post.
- 15 July: Agra Summit starts. President Pervez Musharraf and Indian Prime Minister Vajpayee holds talks over long-standing issues.
- 14 August: New Local Government system installed, after holding of elections in three phases.
- 15 September: The September 11 attacks in America result in Pakistan agreeing to cooperate with the campaign against Al Qaeda.
- 16 September: US Secretary of State Powell told that Pakistan's President Musharraf had agreed to support the U.S. anti-terrorist campaign.
- 7 October: United States invasion of Afghanistan
- 28 October: Bahawalpur church shooting, 18 Christians are killed in retaliation for United States invasion of Afghanistan
- 10 November: US President Bush meets President Musharraf in New York and assures additional aid of one billion dollars.
- 13 December:
  - 2001 Indian Parliament attack is blamed on Pakistan by India.
  - 2001–2002 India–Pakistan standoff begins and 800,000 Indian troops gather at Pakistani border.
- December: Pakistan and India moved ballistic missiles closer to each other's border, and mortar and artillery fire was reported in Kashmir.

==== 2002 ====
- 1 January: an earthquake strikes northern Pakistan.
- 5 January: Musharraf stunned Vajpayee by a hand-shake at the last 11th SAARC summit in Kathmandu.
- 12 January: President Musharraf declares a war on extremism.
- 14 January: India calls off Operation Pakram.
- 22 February — The American journalist Daniel Pearl was kidnapped and murdered in Karachi.
- 26 February At least 11 Shi'a worshipers were killed by firing at the Shah-i-Najaf Mosque in Rawalpindi.
- 30 April: General Pervez Musharraf wins a referendum thus ensures 5 more years in office.
- 2002: Operation al-Mizan is initiated by Pakistan and US against Islamist militants.
- 17 March — A grenade attack on a Protestant church in tdiplomatic enclave in Islamabad killed five persons, including a US diplomat's wife and daughter.
- 8 May: 2002 Karachi bus bombing, 15 killed.
- 24 August: President General Musharraf issues the Legal Framework Order 2002.
- 25 September — Gunmen attacked the offices of a Christian welfare organisation in Karachi killing 7.
- 10 October: 2002 Pakistani general election, First general elections since the 1999 military coup held.
- 21 November: A 6.3 M_{w} earthquake strikes northern Pakistan, leaving sixteen dead, forty injured, and more than 1,000 buildings damaged.
- 23 November: Mir Zafarullah Khan Jamali sworn in as Prime Minister.
- 26 November: The Pakistan army evacuates thousands of people following the earthquake
- 5 December: Three people were killed in an attack at the Macedonian Honorary consulate in Karachi.
- 25 December Grenade attack at a Presbyterian church in Pakistan's central Punjab province, killed three young girls.

==== 2003 ====
- 24 February: Senate elections: Ruling party wins most seats in voting to the upper house.
- 23 March: AAJ TV, Pakistan's premier channel inaugurated.
- 8 June:- 11 Pakistani police trainees were shot dead in a sectarian attack on Sariab Road, Quetta, as they all belonged to Hazara Shi'a branch of Islam.
- 24 June: President Pervez Musharraf meets US President G.W. Bush in Camp David. US announces $3-billion five-year economic assistance package for Pakistan.
- 4 July: 2003 Quetta mosque bombing, 44 killed.
- 11 July: Lahore-Delhi bus service resumed after suspension of 18 months.
- August: Floods in Sindh province result in tens of thousands of people fleeing to relief camps and a food crisis.
- 14 December: General Musharraf survived an assassination attempt in Rawalpindi.
- 25 December General Musharraf survives another assassination attempt

==== 2004 ====
- 1 January: General Musharraf won a vote of confidence in the Senate, National Assembly, and provincial assemblies.
- 5 January: Musharraf meets Vajpayee in Islamabad, discusses Kashmir dispute.
- 18 January: Pakistani agents arrest seven Al-Qaida suspects and confiscate weapons during a raid in the southern city of Karachi.
- 16 March: War in North-West Pakistan begins.
- 16 March: Battle of Wanna begins
- 23 March: Battle of Wanna ends with a Pakistani victory.
- 22 April: The European Parliament voted in favour of a new trade and cooperation agreement with Pakistan, giving a vital boost to Islamabad's relations with the European Union.
- 22 May: Pakistan readmitted to Commonwealth.
- 18 June 2004: Start of Drone strikes in Pakistan, The first known U.S. drone strike killed 5–8 people including Nek Muhammad Wazir and two children, in a strike near Wana, South Waziristan. Pakistan's Army initially claimed the attack as its own work.
- 26 June: Prime Minister Zafarullah Khan Jamali steps down and nominates Ch. Shujaat Hussain as his interim successor.
- 28 August: Shaukat Aziz becomes Prime Minister.
- 9 September: About 70 Taliban or Al Qaida militants, are killed when Pakistan's air force jets raid a terrorist training camp in a tribal region bordering Afghanistan.

==== 2005 ====
- 8 January:- At least 10 people were killed in sectarian violence in the city of Gilgit, Gilgit-Baltistan.
- 2005: Start of Fifth Balochistan conflict, Rape of a female doctor (Shazia Khalid) at the Sui gas facility and the resulting government response started the Fifth Balochistan conflict.
- 19 March:- At least 35 people were killed by a blast at the shrine of Pir Rakhel Shah in the village of Fatehpur in Jhal Magsi District.
- 14 May: 2 killed including Haitham al-Yemeni in a strike near the Afghan border in North Waziristan.
- 25 May:- Six members of a family were killed in an explosion at the village of Bandkhel in Makin Subdivision, South Waziristan.
- 27 May: 2005 Islamabad bombing, At least 20 people were killed and 82 wounded.
- 13 July: 136 people killed and about 170 injured in a collision of three passenger trains near Ghotki.
- 14 July: NWFP Assembly passes the Hasba bill with a majority vote.
- 19 July: Government of Pakistan launches country-wide crackdown against extremist elements.
- 7 October:- 2005 Mong shootings Eight Ahmadiyya are killed
- 8 October: The 7.6 M_{w} Kashmir earthquake affects Azad Kashmir with a maximum Mercalli intensity of VIII (Severe), killing more than 79,000 people and displacing several million more.
- 10 October: The president of Pakistan appeals for international help following the earthquake, saying the country cannot deal with crisis on its own.
- 11 October: Renowned littérateur, linguist and poet, Shanul Haq Haqqee, passes away in Toronto. He was 88.
- 13 October: Clashes between the Rangers and civilians in Gilgit kill 12.
- 5 November: a strike destroys the house of Abu Hamza Rabia killing his wife, three children and four others.
- 30 November: Al-Qaeda's 3rd in command, Abu Hamza Rabia killed in an attack by CIA drones in Asoray, near Miranshah, the capital of North Waziristan along with 4 other militants. Among the deaths are 8 year old Noor Aziz and 17-year-old Abdul Wasit.
- 15 December: the inspector general of the Frontier Corps, Major General Shujaat Zamir Dar, and his deputy Brigadier Salim Nawazl were wounded after shots were fired at their helicopter by Baloch separatists ."
- 22 December: Seven killed in a battle between Islamists and bandits in Jandola.

==== 2006 ====
- 2 January: Dr. Shamshad Akhtar assumes office of State Bank Governor having the first woman Governor of SBP.
- 13 January: Damadola airstrike kills 18 civilians, in Bajaur area but misses Ayman al-Zawahri, five women, eight men, and five children are among the dead.
- 25 January: Landmine blast in Dera Bugti District kills 6.
- 5 February:- 13 killed in a blast on Lahore-bound bus .
- 9 February: 36 killed in violence on the Day of Ashura.
- 2 March: A power suicide car bomb attack near the US Consulate, Karachi, killed four people including a US diplomat, a day before President George W. Bush was to reach Pakistan.
- 10 March: 2006 Pakistan landmine blast, 26 people, are killed.
- 26 April: Pervez Musharraf lays foundation-stone of Diamir-Bhasha dam.
- 11 April: 2006 Karachi Nishtar Park bombing Over 50 people are killed.
- 14 May: Charter of democracy (CoD) is signed by two former prime ministers of Pakistan, Nawaz Sharif and Benazir Bhutto in London.
- 12 June: Five people were killed in a bomb attack in Quetta hotel.
- 15 June Five police officers are killed by gunmen .
- 16 June: Two female teachers and two children were shot dead in Khoga Chiri village in Orakzai Agency.
- 8 July: Process to release over 1600 women prisoners from 55 jails across starts after Presidential Ordinance.
- 10 July: Noted poet, writer and columnist, Ahmed Nadeem Qasmi, passes away in Lahore. He was 89.
- 26 August: Prominent Baloch leader and politician Sirdar Akbar Bugti killed by military
- 26–31 August:- Akbar Bugti's killing sparked five days of rioting that left six people dead, dozens wounded and 700 under arrest.
- 5 September: Waziristan Accords are signed.
- 8 September:- At least six people were killed in bomb blast in Barkhan District.
- 6 October:: 17 people were killed in sectarian violence .
- 20 October: A bomb blast killed six people in Peshawar.
- 30 October: Chenagai airstrike allegedly aimed at Ayman al-Zawahri destroys a madrassa in Bajaur area and kills 70–80 people. Pakistani military officials claim there were militants while provincial minister Siraj ul-Haq and a local eyewitness said they were innocent pupils resuming studies after the Muslim Eid holidays.
- 8 November:2006 Dargai bombing, 42 Pakistani Army soldiers are killed .
- 2006: Operation al-Mizan ends in a US-Pakistani victory.

==== 2007 ====
- 15 January: A blast in the Jalozai killed four people.
- 16 January: Up to 30 Taliban killed in a drone strike in Salamat Keley, Zamazola, South Waziristan.
- 26 January: Two people were killed in a suicide attack at the Marriott hotel in the capital Islamabad.
- 27 January: 13 people, including the Chief of Peshawar City Police Malik Saad, were killed in suicide bombing near a crowded Shiite mosque
- 29 January: January 2007 Dera Ismail Khan suicide bombing 2 people were killed
- 6 February:- A suicide bomber detonated himself outside Islamabad International Airport.
- 17 February: A suicide bomber killed 15 people inside a courtroom in Quetta, Balochistan.
- 20 February: Punjab Minister for social welfare Zil-e-Huma Usman was shot and killed in Gujranwala.
- 9 March: President Musharraf dismissed Chief Justice of Pakistan, Iftikhar.
- 19–22 March: Clashes between pro-government forces and al-Qaeda remnants in the Waziristan kill 135 people on both sides.
- 6 April: 2007 Kurram Agency conflict begins.
- 10–11 April: 35 people were killed in secterian violence in Kurram Agency.
- 13 April: 2007 Kurram Agency conflict ends with a victory of Pakistani government and allied Shi'ite militias.
- 26 April: 4 people killed in the village of Saidgi in North Waziristan in an airstrike. Habib Ullah the owner of the destroyed house, said those killed were not terrorists.
- 28 April April 2007 Charsadda bombing An assassination attempt on Aftab Ahmad Khan Sherpao, Interior minister is unsuccessful but 28 others are killed .
- 12 May: 12 May Karachi riots 50 people were killed in clashes
- 13 May: Afghanistan–Pakistan border skirmishes, 3 Pakistani soldiers were wounded, 13-41 Afghans were killed.
- 15 May: 2007 Peshawar hotel bombing, 24 people are killed.
- 2 June; Five people are killed in road side bombing in Bajaur District
- 8 June: Three people were killed in a bus bombing in Lasbela District.
- 19 June: 30 killed in the village of Mami Rogha in an airstrike in North Waziristan
- 23 June: A barrage of artillery and missiles fired from Afghanistan hit residential compounds and a hotel in Mangrotai area of North Waziristan, killing 11 people.
- 6 July:
  - President General Pervez Musharraf escaped yet another attempt on his life.
  - Four Pakistan Army troops were killed in an IED attack on a military convoy in Dir District
- 8 July: 3 Chinese workers are killed by gunmen
- 11 July: Siege of Lal Masjid ends, which started on 3 July.
- 12 July: Seven people were killed in five attacks in Swat district.
- 14 July: 23 soldiers are killed in a car bombing.
- 15 July:- At least 49 are killed in multiple incidents across Khyber Pakhtunkhwa
- 17 July:- At least 17 people were killed in a suicide bombing in Islamabad.
- 19 July:- More than 40 people were killed in three separate bomb attacks.
- 24 July:- Nine people were killed in rocket attacks in Bannu.
- 27 July:
  - 13 people are killed in a suicide bombing at Muzaffar hotel in Islamabad
  - The same day Raziq Bugti, former guerrilla commander turned spokesman for the Balochistan government, was assassinated in Quetta.
- 2 August:- A shootout in Sargodha killed a policeman and suspected bomber.
- 4 August:- Nine people were killed in suicide bombing in Parachinar, Kurram Agency.
- 25 August – Pakistan successfully tests a nuclear capable cruise missile named Hatf-VIII having a range of 350 km (220 mi).
- 26 August:- Four policemen were killed in a suicide attack in Shangla District.
- 4 September September 2007 bombings in Rawalpindi 25 people were killed
- 11 September:- 17 people are killed in a van bombing in Dera Ismail Khan district. The same day Omar Ayub Khan's protocol officer, Liaquat Hussain, was found shot dead near the Northern Bypass in Karachi.
- 13 September:- At least 20 off-duty commandos were killed in Haripur near Tarbela Dam.
- 15 September:Maulana Hassan Jan is assassinated .
- 20 September: Al-Qaeda declares war on Pakistan.
- 1 October Suicide bombing in Bannu killed 16 people
- 7 October: Battle of Mirali starts
- 10 October: Battle of Mirali ends in a Pakistani victory.
- 12 October: Mohmand Taliban publicly behead six "criminals".
- 18 October: Bhutto, Benazir returned to Pakistan, after exile of about 8 years.
- 19 October: 2007 Karsaz bombing, 180 killed.
- 20 October: Eight people were killed in a bomb blast in Dera Bugti.
- 25 October:
  - 20 people are killed in a suicide blast in swat.
  - First Battle of Swat begins
- 30 October: 7 killed in a suicide attack on a checkpost in Rawalpindi.
- 1 November: A suicide bomber rammed his motorcycle into a PAF bus near Sargodha, killing 10
- 2 November: 5 killed in an airstrike on a madrasah in North Waziristan
- 3 November: Pervez Musharraf imposed emergency, most of the senior judges of Supreme Court ousted.
- 9 November: A suicide bomber killed 3 in Peshawar.
- 16 November: After completion of 5 years, National Assembly dissolved, Caretaker government of Muhammad Mian Soomro took oath.
- 24 November:- 30 people were killed in two suicide attacks in Rawalpindi.
- 25 November: Nawaz Sharif returned Pakistan after 7 years of forced exile.
- 8 December: First Battle of Swat ends in a Pakistani victory.
- 9 December: At least 10 people were killed in a car bombing near Matta, Swat District.
- 10 December:- A suicide attack on the school bus injuring 7.
- 13 December:- Two suicide bombings in Quetta killed seven people.
- 15 December:
  - Emergency lifted, civil rights and suspended constitution restored
  - A suicide bombing on a military checkpost killed five people in Nowshera.
- 17 December 2007 Charsadda mosque bombing 12 people were killed
- 21 December: On the eve of Eid ul-Adha, a suicide bomb blast again targeted Aftab Ahmad Sherpao killing at least 57 and injuring over 100 at Jamia Masjid Sherpao, in Charsadda District. Sherpao survived the blast; his younger son Mustafa Khan Sherpao, was injured.
- 23 December Seven people were killed in a suicide blast in Mingora.
- 27 December: Assassination of Benazir Bhutto, Benazir Bhutto assassinated, along with 20 others.
- 28 December:
  - 33 people are killed in the aftermath of the Assassination of Benazir Bhutto
  - A roadside bomb killed nine people including the grandson of Wali-e-Swat in Swat District.
- 2007: Second MQM insurrection Alleged Pashtuns with ties to Pakistani Taliban along with civilian Pashtuns are killed by MQM.

==== 2008 ====
- 2 January: Elections are postponed following the assassination of Benazir Bhutto.
- 3 January: Pervez Musharraf denies any role in Benazir Bhutto's death. (CNN)
- 10 January: 24 people were killed in a suicide blast outside Lahore High Court.
- 24 January: Pakistan launched Operation Zalzala
- 31 January: The United States announces that Abu Laith al-Libi in a missile strike in northwest Pakistan
- 9 February: 2008 Charsadda bombing, 27 killed.
- 16 February: 2008 Parachinar bombing, 47 killed.
- 18 February: Elections are held amidst tight security. PPP, PML-N, PML-N and ANP win 124, 91, 54 and 13 seats respectively.
- 29 February Mingora funeral bombing, 38 killed
- 24 March: Yusuf Raza Gilani is elected as the new Prime Minister.
- 19 April: Taliban rebels release a video of Pakistan's ambassador to Afghanistan who they are holding as a hostage.
- 20 May: Operation Zalzala ends in a Pakistani victory.
- 10 June: Gora Prai airstrike accidentally hits a Pakistani post killing 10.
- 28 June: Pakistan launched Operation Sirat-e-Mustaqeem
- 6 July: 2008 Lal Masjid bombing, 18 policeman killed and 1 civilian.
- 9 July: Operation Sirat-e-Mustaqeem ends in a Pakistani victory followed by the launch of Operation Zarb E Kaleem.
- 7 August: Battle of Bajaur begins.
- 18 August: Pervez Musharraf resigns.
- 21 August: 2008 Wah bombing, 70 killed.
- 6 September: Asif Zardari wins presidential election with 481 votes.
- 9 September: Asif Zardari takes oath as President of Pakistan.
- 21 September: Lowara Madi incident, no fatalities reported
- 25 September: Tanai incident damages and American helicopter.
- November–December: 2008 India–Pakistan standoff
- 2008: Terrorist incidents in Pakistan in 2008 Pakistan saw 40 terrorist attacks, which caused 154 fatalities and 256 injuries.
- 2008: Drone strike in Pakistan, 36 strikes killed 223 militants, 47 unknown and 28 civilians.

==== 2009 ====
- 16 February: Pakistan government announces a truce with Taliban, accepting a system of Islamic law in the Swat valley, conceding the area as a Taliban sanctuary.
- 9 March: Militants attack bus with the touring Sri Lankan cricket team. All international cricket matches in Pakistan are suspended. Pakistan also loses its status as hosts for the 2011 Cricket World Cup.
- 16 March: As the result of long march Lawyers' Movement succeeded. Iftikhar Mohammed Chaudhry was restored as Chief Justice of Pakistan and other judges dismissed by Musharraf.
- 27 March: 2009 Jamrud mosque bombing, 48–70 killed.
- 13 April: Nizam-e-Adl Regulation 2009 is passed.
- 26 April: Operation Black Thunderstorm is initiated by Pakistan
- 16 May: Second Battle of Swat starts
- 23 May: Pakistan Army launched Operation Rah-e-Rast and cleared Swat valley of all Taliban elements. It is regarded as one of the most successful counter-insurgency operations in modern age (to 15 July)
- 14 June: Operation Black Thunderstorm ends in a Pakistani victory.
- 4 April: 2009 Islamabad Frontier Corps post bombing, 5 killed.
- 5 April: 2009 Chakwal mosque bombing, more than 30 killed.
- 9 June: Pearl Continental hotel bombing, 17 killed.
- 19 June: Operation Rah-e-Nijat started by Pakistan.
- 3 July: military helicopter crash killed 41 people, Taliban claimed that they shot down the helicopter but Pakistani authorities denied the claim.
- 15 July: Second Battle of Swat ends in a Pakistani victory.
- 1 August: The 2009 Gojra riots began. Militant Islamists attacked Pakistan's Christian minority in a massive anti-Christian pogrom.
- 17 August: Pakistan joins the coalition for Operation Ocean Shield in Somalia.
- 1 September: 2009 Khyber Pass offensive is initiated by Pakistan
- September: Orakzai and Kurram offensive initiated by Pakistan
- 10–11 October: Operation Janbaz is successfully executed by Pakistani forces
- 20 October: 2009 International Islamic University bombing, 4 killed.
- 2 November: November 2009 Rawalpindi bombing, 35 killed.
- 3 November: Mohmand offensive is initiated by Pakistan.
- 30 November: 2009 Khyber Pass offensive ends in a Pakistani victory
- 4 December: December 2009 Rawalpindi attack, 40 killed.
- 12 December: Operation Rah-e-Nijat ends in a Pakistani victory.
- 2009: Terrorist incidents in Pakistan in 2009, 50 terrorist, insurgent and sectarian-related incidents that killed 180 people and injured 300.
- 2009: Drone strike in Pakistan, 54 strikes killed 387 militants, 92 unknown and 70 civilians.

=== 2010s ===
==== 2010 ====
- First January: Lakki Marwat Shah Hassan khel suicide attack, 130 killed 250 injured.
- 10 January: January 2010 Bajaur bombing, 16 killed.
- 3 February: February 2010 Lower Dir bombing, 8 killed.
- 5 February: February 2010 Karachi bombings, 25 killed.
- 18 February: February 2010 Khyber mosque bombing, 30 killed.
- 17 February: 2010 Kohistan avalanche killed over 100 people.
- 12 March: Lahore church bombings, more than 72 killed.
- 5 April:
  - April 2010 U.S consulate and ANP attack, 50 killed.
  - 2010 Timergarah bombings, 46 killed.
- 10 April:
  - Pakistan adopts the 18th amendment to the Constitution, stripping President Asif Ali Zardari of key powers.
  - The military kills 100 people in an air raid on a Taliban area in the north-west.
- 17 April: April 2010 Kohat bombings, 58 killed.
- 19 April: 19 April 2010 Peshawar bombing. 25 killed.
- 28 May: 2010 Ahmadiyya mosques massacre, 87 killed.
- June: Orakzai and Kurram offensive, battle ends in a Pakistani victory.
- 6 June: Cyclone Phet makes landfall near Karachi before wreaking havoc in coastal Balochistan province.
- 4 June: Operation Madad by Pakistan navy.
- 1 July: July 2010 Lahore bombings, 50 killed.
- 9 July: Mohmand Agency bombing, 104 killed.
- 16-19 June: Pakistan navy executes Operation Umeed-e-Nuh against Somali pirates.
- 3–6 August: 2010 Karachi riots after the assassination of MP Raza Haider killed 90.
- September: 2010 Pakistan floods. At least 1,600 people were killed.
- 1 September: September 2010 Lahore bombings, 38 killed.
- 3 September: September 2010 Quetta bombing, 73 killed.
- 30 September: Kurram incident, two American helicopters are damaged.
- 20 October: Political and ethnic violence in Karachi killed 35.
- 5 November:
  - 2010 Darra Adam Khel mosque bombing, 66 killed.
  - 2010 Karachi Beechcraft 1900 crash
- 25 December: December 2010 Bajaur bombing, 47 killed.
- 2010: Terrorist incidents in Pakistan in 2010, more than a thousand fatalities.
- 2010: Drone strikes in Pakistan, 122 drone strikes killed 788 militants, 45 unknown and 16 civilians.

==== 2011 ====
- 19 January : The 7.2 M_{w} 2011 Dalbandin earthquake killed 3.
- February: Operation Madad is successfully executed.
- 30 March-1 April: 2011 India–Pakistan border skirmish
- 3 April: 2011 Dera Ghazi Khan bombings, more than 50 killed.
- 2 May: The US Navy Seals killed Osama bin Laden in the city of Abbottabad.
- 17 May: Kurram incident wounds two Pakistani soldiers.
- 12 June: June 2011 Peshawar bombings, more than 34 were killed.
- 24 June: The cell phone of Osama bin Laden's courier is reported to contain contacts with Harakat-ul-Mujahadeen, suggesting potential ties to ISI.
- 4 July: Operation Koh-e-Sufaid is initiated by Pakistan.
- July – August: Mass target killing occurred killing ~344 people throughout Karachi.
- 11 August: 2011 Sindh floods kill 439.
- 18 August: Operation Koh-e-Sufaid ends in a Pakistani victory.
- 19 August: 2011 Khyber Agency bombing, more than 48 killed.
- 26 September: Salala incident kills 24 soldiers. US apologies for the incident. NATO routes are reopened.
- 2011:' Terrorist incidents in Pakistan in 2011
- 2011: Drone strikes in Pakistan, 70 drone strikes kill 415 militants 35 unknown and 62 civilians.
- 2011: Afghanistan–Pakistan border skirmishes, 8 skirmishes were reported.

==== 2012 ====
- 2 January: India-Pakistan exchange a list of their nuclear installations.
- 12 January: Afghanistan–Pakistan border skirmishes, 11 Afghan soldiers are killed but no casualties on Pakistani side.
- January: 2012 Pakistan fake medicine crisis kills 112.
- 24 April: Karachi targeted action and Operation Lyari are initiated.
- 4 May: Operation Lyari is halted due to heavy casualties.
- 22 June: Raja Pervaiz Ashraf is elected as Prime Minister of Pakistan, following the disqualification of Yousaf Raza Gillani over a contempt of court conviction by the Supreme Court of Pakistan.
- 12 September: 2012 Pakistan floods
- September: 2012 Pakistan garment factory fires kill 359. (Reuters)
- 9 October: 15-year-old blogger Malala Yousafzai was shot in the head by the Pakistani Taliban.
- 20 December: Mohmand offensive ends in a Pakistani victory.
- 2012: Terrorist incidents in Pakistan in 2012
- 2012: Drone strikes in Pakistan, 48 strikes killed 268 militants, 33 unknown and 5 civilians.

==== 2013 ====
- 6 January: 2013 India–Pakistan border skirmishes start
- 10 January: January 2013 Quetta bombings, 130 killed.
- 5 April: Operation Rah-e-Shahadat is initiated by Pakistan.
- 2 May: Afghanistan–Pakistan border skirmishes, one Afghan police officer is killed in a skirmish.
- 7 May: 7 May 2013 Syed Janan election rally bombing, 18–25 killed.
- 11 May: 2013 Pakistani general election held
- 5 June: Nawaz Sharif is elected Prime Minister of Pakistan, following the Pakistan Muslim League (N)'s victory in the 2013 general elections for the 3rd time.
- 8 June: Pakistan Army Aviation Bell AH-1 Cobra Gunship Helicopters crossed into Afghanistan and hit 3 TTP Targets before returning.
- 15 June: June 2013 Quetta attacks, 26 killed.
- 18 June: 2013 Mardan funeral bombing, 28 killed.
- 21 June: 2013 Peshawar mosque bombing, 15 killed.
- 30 June: Operation Rah-e-Shahadat ends in a Pakistani victory.
- 30 July: Mamnoon Hussain is elected as the 12th President of Pakistan in 2013 Presidential elections.
- 6 August: 2013 Pakistan–Afghanistan floods, 140 killed
- 8 August: August 2013 Quetta bombing, 31 killed.
- 7 September: Operation Lyari is resumed.
- 22 September: Peshawar church bombing, 127 killed.
- 24 September: 2013 Balochistan earthquakes 825 killed.
- 29 September: Qissa Khawani Bazaar bombing, 41 killed.
- 28 October: 2013 India–Pakistan border skirmishes end with 9 Indian fatalities and 13-15 Pakistani fatalities.
- 2013: Terrorist incidents in Pakistan in 2013
- 2013: Drone strikes in Pakistan 26 drone strikes killed 145 militants, 4 unknown and 4 civilians.

==== 2014 ====
- 7 January: Aitzaz Hasan died between Preventing suicide bomber attack at his school in Hangu District, sacrificed his own life to save the lives of hundreds of his mates.
- 19 January:
  - 2014 Bannu bombing, 26 killed.
  - 2014 Rawalpindi suicide bombing, 14 killed.
- January 20: Pakistani military aircraft bomb suspected Taliban hideouts killing 25 militants in North Waziristan.
- 11 February: Second occurrence in Peshawar cinema bombings, 13 killed. First occurrence was on 2 February, which killed 5.
- February 17: Former president Pervez Musharraf appeared in front of a civil court for the first time.
- March 1: The Pakistan Taliban announces a one-month ceasefire aimed at reviving peace talks.
- March 2: Pakistani military bombs the hideout of a Taliban militant leader killing five insurgents.
- 3 March: Islamabad court attack, 11 killed.
- March 31: A Pakistani court charges former President Pervez Musharraf with high treason in relation to the imposition of the emergency rule in 2007
- April 12: Gunmen kidnap 100 men from a tribal gathering in North-West Pakistan.
- April 13: 73 people are released from captivity by the Taliban, a day after they were kidnapped.
- May 7: An alleged American FBI agent is arrested for carrying ammunition while trying to board a flight.
- May 21: Pakistan Air Force fighter jets bomb suspected militant hideouts in North Waziristan, killing approximately 60 militants and injuring another 30.
- June 9: 2014 Jinnah International Airport attack
- June 10: The Pakistan Air Force conducts bombing raids against Tehrik-i-Taliban Pakistan positions in the Tirah region killing at least 15 militants in response to the Jinnah International Airport attack in Karachi.
- June 15:
  - Pakistan initiates Operation Zarb-e-Azb
  - Airstrikes in the northwestern tribal area bordering Afghanistan kill as many as 100 militants.
- June 16: The Pakistan Air Force conducts airstrikes against 6 Tehrik-i-Taliban Pakistan positions in North Waziristan, killing 27 militants.
- June 17: Clashes in Lahore between the Punjab Police and Pakistan Awami Tehreek activists results in several protesters being killed by police gunfire.
- July 6: Start of 2014–2015 India–Pakistan border skirmishes
- September 4: Monsoon rains in Pakistan kill more than 40 people.
- September 9 – 2014 India–Pakistan floods kill 205 in Pakistan and 200 in India.
- 28 September: At least 21 militants are killed in airstrikes and a gunfight in Pakistan's northwestern tribal areas.
- 7 October: Pakistan initiates Operation Khyber
- 10 October: Activist Malala Yousafzai becomes the first Pakistani to win the Nobel Peace Prize for her struggle to voice girls' right to education.
- 2 November: 2014 Wagah border suicide attack, 60 killed.
- 16 December: 2014 Peshawar school massacre, 148 killed.
- December: National Action Plan (Pakistan) is formulated.
- December: 2014 Kunar Offensive, Pakistan supports Afghanistan against Taliban by sending troops.
- 2014: Terrorist incidents in Pakistan in 2014
- 2014: Drone strikes in Pakistan, 22 drone strikes kill 145 militants with no civilian casualties.
- 2014: Afghanistan–Pakistan border skirmishes, 4 skirmishes are reported.

==== 2015 ====
- 4 January:
  - A United States airstrike kills 8 Uzbek people claimed to be linked with al-Qaeda.
  - The Pakistan Air Force strikes Pakistani Taliban positions in Khyber Agency killing 31 militants.
- 11 January:2015 Karachi traffic accident kills 60.
- 25 January: Blackout leaves 80% of Pakistan without power
- 13 February: 2015 Peshawar mosque attack, 19 killed.
- 11 March: MQM insurrection (1994-present), Pakistan Rangers carried out a raid at Nine Zero and Khursheed Begum Memorial Hall and arrested over 100 MQM activists.
- 15 March: Lahore church bombings, 19 killed.
- 26-29 March: Evacuation of Pakistani citizens during the Yemeni civil war (2015)
- 23 October: 2015 Jacobabad bombing, 22 killed.
- 2 November: End of 2014–2015 India–Pakistan border skirmishes
- 2015: Terrorist incidents in Pakistan in 2015
- 2015: Drone strikes in Pakistan, 10 strikes kill 57 militants, no civilian casualties were reported.
- 2015: Afghanistan–Pakistan border skirmishes kill 7 Pakistani soldiers.

==== 2016 ====
- January: The Pakistan and India governments provided one another with a full list of nuclear sites, military and civilian, in accordance with the 1988 Non-Nuclear Aggression Agreement
- 20 January: Bacha Khan University attack, 20 killed.
- 28 February: Sharmeen Obaid-Chinoy won her second Academy Award for Best Documentary Short Subject for A Girl in the River: The Price of Forgiveness
- 16 March: 2016 Peshawar bus bombing, 15 killed
- 27 March: 2016 Lahore suicide bombing, 75 killed.
- 20 April: In Punjab, at least 33 people died after eating sweets, accidentally tainted with insecticide.
- 13-16 June: Pakistan-Afghanistan skirmishes, 1 Pakistani and 7 Afghans are killed.
- 16 September: 2016 September Pakistan mosque bombing, 36 killed.
- 28 September:
  - 2016 Indian Line of Control strike
  - Start of 2016–2018 India–Pakistan border skirmishes
- October: 2016 Pakistan Floods
- 24 October: 2016 Peshawar bus bombing, 62 killed.
- 12 November: 2016 Khuzdar bombing, 47 killed.
- 7 December: PIA plane PK-661 crashed during flight killing 47 people including Junaid Jumshed and his wife.
- 2016: Terrorist incidents in Pakistan in 2016
- 2016: Drone strikes in Pakistan, 3 strikes killed 9 militants, no civilian casualties were reported.

==== 2017 ====
- 21 January: A bombing at a vegetable market in Parachinar, Pakistan leads to the death of 25 people.
- 9 February: 2017 Pakistan Super League began.
- 22 February: Operation Zarb-e-Azb ends in a Pakistani victory.
- 23 February: Operation Radd-ul-Fasaad is initiated by Pakistan.
- 28 July: A unanimous verdict by the Supreme Court of Pakistan disqualified Prime Minister Nawaz Sharif from office, over the controversy of Panama Papers, which led to his resignation.
- 1 August: Shahid Khaqan Abbasi was sworn in as prime minister, succeeding Nawaz Sharif.
- 21 August: Operation Khyber ends in a Pakistani victory.
- 5-27 November: 2017 Tehreek-e-Labaik protest led to the resignation of the Federal Minister of Law and Justice Zahid Hamid.
- 2017: Terrorist incidents in Pakistan in 2017
- 2017: Drone strikes in Pakistan, 8 strikes kill 36 militants, 1 unknown and 2 civilians.
- 2017: Pakistan-Afghanistan skirmishes, two skirmishes are reported.

==== 2018 ====
- 27 May: The twenty-fifth amendment to the Constitution of Pakistan was approved by the Parliament of Pakistan and the Provincial Assembly of Khyber Pakhtunkhwa (KP), giving way to the merger of the Federally Administered Tribal Areas into the province of Khyber Pakhtunkhwa.
- 16 June: End of 2016–2018 India–Pakistan border skirmishes
- 6 July: Former Prime Minister Nawaz Sharif, his daughter Maryam Nawaz and son-in-law Safdar Awan were given prison sentences of 10, 7 and 1 years respectfully on controversial corruption charges.
- 25 July: 2018 Pakistani general election are held and Imran khan became Prime Minister of Pakistan with majority .
- 31 October – 17 November: Pakistani troops take part in 2018 Batangafo clashes.
- 2018: Terrorist incidents in Pakistan in 2018
- 2018: Drone strikes in Pakistan 6 strikes killed 9 militant, no civilian casualties were reported.
- 2018: Pakistan-Afghanistan skirmishes, two skirmishes were reported.

==== 2019 ====
- 10 – 11, 17 – 19 January: Pakistani troops take part in January 2019 Bambari clashes
- 1 February: 2019 Pakistan floods and storms
- 14 February: Start of 2019 India–Pakistan border skirmishes
- 26 February: Officially spurns Indian claims of Balakot airstrike
- 27 February:
  - Pakistan Air Force shoots down two Indian warplanes in a skirmish and captured Indian pilot wing commander Abhinandan Varthaman
  - 2019 Jammu and Kashmir airstrikes
- 2 March: Pakistan released Abhinandan Varthaman and returned him to India in a simple ceremony via Wagha border.
- 22 March: End of 2019 India–Pakistan border skirmishes
- April: 2019 Sindh HIV outbreak
- July–December: 2019 dengue outbreak in Pakistan
- 30 July: 2019 Pakistan Army military plane crash
- 5 August: India revoked article 370 of the constitution and partitioned the state of Jammu and Kashmir.
- 24 September: Pakistan earthquake
- 31 October: Train fire
- 14 December: Named the top holiday destination for travelers for the year 2020 by the United States-based luxury and lifestyle publication Conde Nast Traveler.
- 2019: Terrorist incidents in Pakistan in 2019
- 2019: Pakistan-Afghanistan skirmishes, 3 skirmishes were reported.

=== 2020 ===
- January 10: January 2020 Quetta bombing by ISIS in a Taliban run mosque killed at least 15 people.
- January 16: 2020 Neelum Valley avalanche killing at least 74 people.
- February 17: February 2020 Quetta bombing on a Sunni rally killed at least 10 people including two police officers
- February 26: The first two cases of COVID-19 are reported in Pakistan.
- February 30: 2020–2021 U.S. troop withdrawal from Afghanistan is initiated, Pakistan logistically supports the Americans.
- 2 March- 19 May: Pakistani troops take part in 2020 N'Délé clashes
- March 10: 2020 Tablighi Jamaat COVID-19 hotspot in Pakistan causing the spread of COVID to various parts of the country. More than 539 confirmed cases were reported.
- March 28: Operation Zarb-e-Ahan is initiated by Pakistan
- April 20: Operation Zarb-e-Ahan ends in a Pakistani victory.
- May 22: Pakistan International Airlines Flight 8303 crashed in Karachi, Sindh, killing 97 of the 99 people on board as well as one on the ground.
- June 29: Pakistan Stock Exchange attack in Karachi left at least 8 people dead including 4 perpetrators.
- August 5: At least 39 people were injured in an RGD-1 grenade attack on a Jamaat-i-Islami rally in the Gulshan-e-Iqbal neighborhood of Karachi. The Sindhudesh Revolutionary Army claimed responsibility for the attack.
- August 10: A bomb killed at least 5 people and several others were injured in Chaman, Balochistan.
- August 25: 2020 Karachi floods killed at least 41 people.
- October 16: two separate attacks killed least 13 soldiers and 7 security guards in Balochistan and North Waziristan.
- 2020: Terrorist incidents in Pakistan in 2020
- 2020: Pakistan-Afghanistan skirmishes, two skirmishes were reported
- 2020: Start of 2020–21 India–Pakistan border skirmishes

=== 2021 ===
- 3 January: Machh attack, a group of Islamic State (IS) militants killed 11 Hazara coal miners.
- 9 January: A massive blackout strikes Pakistan, leaving as much as 90 percent of the country without electricity at its height as officials rush to restore power.
- 25 February: End of 2020–21 India–Pakistan border skirmishes
- 24 March: 2021 Chaman bombings in Chaman, Balochistan killed 10 people.
- 21 April: Quetta Serena Hotel bombing killed 5 people.
- 26 May: Operation Shikarpur is initiated by Pakistan.
- 14 July: Dasu bus attack, a bus carrying Chinese workers in the Dasu area of Upper Kohistan District, Pakistan, fell into a ravine after an explosion, killing 13 people, including nine Chinese citizens and four Pakistanis, and injuring 28 others.
- 20 August: 2021 Gwadar bombing, a suicide attack on a convoy of Chinese workers on the Gwadar Expressway project, as a result two local children were killed and three were injured in southwestern Pakistan.
- 26 August: 26 August 2021 Balochistan attacks, four security personnel were killed and six others were injured in attacks by terrorist in Balochistan's Ziarat and Panjgur districts.
- 14 August: Karachi grenade attack killed 14 civilians.
- 15 August: Fall of Kabul (2021)
- 30 August: 2020–2021 U.S. troop withdrawal from Afghanistan is complete, Pakistan becomes largest base for coalition evacuees
- 5 September: 2021 Quetta suicide attack killed 4 Frontier Corps soldiers.
- 7 October: 2021 Balochistan earthquake killed at least 42 people and injuring 300 others.
- 22 October: October 2021 Tehreek-e-Labbaik Pakistan protests, clashes led to the death of 7 policemen and more than 50 protestors.
- 3 November: Azad Kashmir bus incident killed 23 people
- 3 December: Lynching of Priyantha Kumara over false accusations of blasphemy.
- 2021: Terrorist incidents in Pakistan in 2021
- 2021: Afghanistan–Pakistan border skirmishes, 4 skirmishes reported

=== 2022 ===
- 8 January: 2022 Murree snowstorm kills 23 domestic tourists.
- 20-23 January: 2022 Pakistan landslides
- 26 January: 2022 Karachi protests
- 2 February: Lumpy skin disease outbreak in Karachi
- 12 February: Lynching of Mushtaq Ahmed
- 27 February:
  - Huqooq-e-Sindh March
  - PPP long march
- 1 March: 2022 heat wave in India and Pakistan
- 8 March: No-confidence motion against Imran Khan
- 9 March: Mian Channu incident
- 10 March: Parliament Lodges operation
- 18 March: Protesters storming Sindh House
- 27 March Imran Khan rally in Islamabad
- 29 March: 2022 MONUSCO helicopter crash 6 Pakistani UN Peacekeeping soldiers killed in Democratic Republic of Congo
- 3 April: 2022 Pakistani constitutional crisis
- 10 April: Imran Khan is removed from the post of Prime Minister of Pakistan through a no-confidence motion, adopted by the majority of the parliament.
- 11 April: Shehbaz Sharif is sworn in as the Prime Minister of Pakistan.
- 16 April: 2022 Pakistani airstrikes in Afghanistan
- 19 May: 2022 Pakistan economic crisis
- 25 May: 2022 Azadi march
- 12 June: 2022 Karachi fire
- 14 June – October: 2022 Pakistan floods
- 21 June: June 2022 Afghanistan earthquake
- 18 July: Sadiqabad boat sinking
- 1 August:
  - 2022 Pakistan Army helicopter incident
  - The 2022 Census of Pakistan
- 2 August: The Election Commission of Pakistan announced verdict of PTI foreign funding case.
- 24 September: Pakistani audio leaks controversy
- 9 October: The Centaurus mall fire
- 28 October: 2022 Azadi March-II
- 3 November: Attempted assassination of Imran Khan
- 2022: Terrorist incidents in Pakistan in 2022
- 2022: Pakistan-Afghanistan skirmishes, 7 skirmishes were reported.

=== 2023 ===
- 5 January: Pakistan was shaken by a 5.8-magnitude earthquake
- 21 January: Muhammad Azam Khan was sworn in as the Caretaker Chief Minister of Khyber Pakhtunkhwa.
- 22 January: Mohsin Raza Naqvi was sworn in as the Caretaker Chief Minister of Punjab.
- 23 January: A major power outage in Pakistan leaves nearly 220 million people without electricity.
- 27 January: It is announced that at least 18 people have been killed in the past two weeks by toxic chemicals from factories in Karachi, Sindh.
- 29 January:
  - Tanda Dam boat disaster: Fifty one people are killed when their boat capsizes in Tanda Dam, Kohat District, Khyber Pakhtunkhwa.
- 30 January: 2023 Peshawar mosque bombing: 84 people are killed and over 200 others are injured when a Jamaat-ul-Ahrar suicide bomber detonates his explosive vest in a mosque in Peshawar.
- 6 February: Pakistani Prime Minister Shehbaz Sharif orders the ban on Wikipedia to be lifted, three days after the website was banned for alleged anti-Muslim and blasphemous content.
- 13 February: Lynching of Muhammad Waris
- 20 February: February 2023 Kallar Kahar bus accident
- 22 February: Jail Bharo Tehreek
- 3 March: Harnai coal mine explosion
- 20 March: Haripur rocket attack
- 21 March: 2023 Afghanistan–Pakistan earthquake
- 30 March: The Lahore High Court rules that Pakistan's sedition law is unconstitutional, on the grounds that it violates free speech.
- 31 March: 2023 Pakistan ration distribution stampedes
- 7 April: Pakistan arrests the founder of the Baloch Nationalist Army in the country's southwest.
- 9 April: Kacha Operation
- 12 April: 2023 Karachi factory fire
- 18 April: 2023 Torkham landslide
- 27 April: 2023 Karachi Express train fire
- 4 May: 2023 Kurram Parachinar conflict begins
- 9 May:
  - Arrest of Imran Khan
  - May 9 riots
- 15 May: 2023 PDM sit-in
- 27 May: 2023 Astore avalanche
- 10 June: 2023 Khyber Pakhtunkhwa rains and storms
- 13 July: 2023 Kurram Parachinar conflict ends with a ceasefire and Pakistani security forces take over the area.
- 26 June 2023 India-Pakistan border skirmishes
- 5 August: Imran Khan is arrested for the second time.
- 6 August: 2023 Hazara Express derailment
- 10 August: President Arif Alvi dissolved the National Assembly on the advice of Prime Minister Shehbaz Sharif.
- 12 August: Anwaar ul Haq Kakar was sworn in as the eighth Caretaker Prime Minister of Pakistan.
- 29 August: The Islamabad High Court reverses a lower court's three-year imprisonment verdict against former prime minister Imran Khan for graft, while granting him bail.
- 16 October: Pakistani Foreign Minister Jalil Abbas Jilani has condemned the Israeli bombing on Gaza, calling the actions "genocide".
- 21 October: Former Pakistani Prime Minister Nawaz Sharif returns to Pakistan after four years in self-imposed exile in London.
- 20 December: Sarfraz Bungulzai, leader of the separatist Baloch Nationalist Army, surrenders to authorities alongside 70 other militants in Balochistan.
- 21 December: Police beat and arrest several protestors during a march toward Islamabad from Turbat, Kech District, after about 200 people planned to rally in the capital to draw attention to the killing of a man in police custody in Balochistan in November.
- 2023: Terrorist incidents in Pakistan in 2023
- 2023: Afghanistan–Pakistan border skirmishes, one skirmish was reported.

=== 2024 ===
- 8 February: The 2024 Pakistani general election is held while results are disputed and delayed with allegations of rigging widespread.
- 3 March: Shehbaz Sharif takes office as Prime Minister of Pakistan for a second term with support from a coalition of the PML-N and PPP.
- 6 March: De-notification issued to the Kakar caretaker government.
- 9 March: The 2024 Pakistani presidential election is held.
- 10 March: Asif Ali Zardari takes office as President of Pakistan for a second term and ends the tenure of Arif Alvi.
- 11 March: A new federal cabinet, the Second Shehbaz Sharif government is sworn in.
- 9 May: The one-year anniversary of the May 9 riots is commemorated by both the PTI and Government of Pakistan. PTI announces protests and processions.
- 6 June: Former prime minister Imran Khan and former foreign minister Shah Mehmood Qureshi are acquitted in a cypher case. Both are still kept in prison.
- 1 July: The Working Group on Arbitrary Detention under the United Nations declares the imprisonment of former Pakistani prime minister Imran Khan as 'unlawful', and claims he should be released immediately.
- 12 July: Reserved seats case is concluded and the Supreme Court of Pakistan rules that the Pakistan Tehreek-e-Insaf is a party and should be granted reserved seats for minorities and women in the national and provincial assemblies.
- 13 July: Iddat case is overturned by the Supreme Court of Pakistan. Both involved, Bushra Bibi and Imran Khan are re-arrested and still kept in prison.
- 2024: Terrorist incidents in Pakistan in 2024
- 2024: 2024 Afghanistan–Pakistan skirmishes

== See also ==
- Timeline of Karachi
- Timeline of Lahore
- Timeline of Peshawar

== Bibliography ==
- Wright, Rita P. (2009), The Ancient Indus: Urbanism, Economy, and Society, Cambridge University Press, ISBN 978-0-521-57219-4
