= MQM insurrection (1978–1992) =

Insurrection in Karachi and Hyderabad, Pakistan

First MQM insurrection
- Part of MQM Militancy
| Date | 1972–1992 |
| Location | Karachi and Hyderabad, Sindh, Pakistan |
| Result | MQM victory: MQM gains a foothold in Karachi; Jamaat-e-Islami weakened; MQM becomes a political force in Sindh and Pakistan; Start of Operation Cleanup |
| Territorial changes | MQM strongholds established in Karachi and Hyderabad |

Belligerents
| Muhajir Qaumi Movement; (no border) All Pakistan Muhajir Students Organization | Pakistan; Sindh; Karachi | Jamaat-e-Islami Pakistan; (no border) Islami Jamiat-e-Talaba; Sindh Taraqi Pasand Party; Armed Afghan immigrants |

Units involved
| MQM; (no border) APSMO | Pakistan; Pakistan Police; Pakistan Rangers; Sindh; Sindh Police; Sindh Rangers | (no border) IJT; STPP; Armed Afghan immigrants |

Casualties and losses
- 1000+ killed

In between 1972 and 1992, MQM militants launched multiple attacks against the Sindh government and civilians in order to get a stronghold over Karachi. The first insurrection came to an end following the Pakistani government's Operation Cleanup conducted in order to destroy the MQM stronghold in Karachi.

== Background ==
The ancestor of the MQM was the All Pakistan Muttahidda Students Organization (APMSO), drew its support from Muhajir defectors from the heavily armed Islami Jamiat ut-Taleba (IJT). A large number of Jamaat-i-Islami members who were ethnic Muhajirs shifted their loyalties to the MQM overnight, resulting in the elimination of the former influence of the Jamaat. APMSO was radicalized when in 1985–1986 the first (of the many) major clashes took place between Karachi's Muhajir and Pashtun communities. Faced by the superior firepower brought in by Afghan refugees, MQM dispatched a delegation of APMSO members to Hyderabad to meet a militant group from the Sindhi nationalist student organization, the Jeay Sindh Students' Federation (JSSF). APMSO were given some small firearms by PSF in the early 1980s, but it was JSSF that sold the APMSO its first large cache of AK-47s that were then used to tame the heavily armed IJT in 1987 and 1988, eventually breaking IJT's hold at Karachi University and in various other state-owned campuses in Karachi. Amidst ethnic violence, MQM's armed wings used street fighting, gang warfare and urban warfare as ethnic Muhajirs sought to use violence to control governing structures and appointments such as the Karachi Port Trust, Karachi Municipal Corporation and the Karachi Developmental Authority. During the MQM's stint in power in 1991, when it was part of the Provincial Government of Sindh, the party endorsed and participated, in raids, mass-arrests, and assassinations of its political rivals/opponents. Additionally, MQM was accused of operating as a mafia organization where its heavily armed militants used extortion and coercion to increase their influence.

== Ethnic violence ==
The first victims of the MQM in the 1980s were primarily ethnic Pashtuns, who were generally targeted on trivial grounds which the MQM did its best to exacerbate. In 1985, a bus accident led to the death of Bushra Zaidi, by an Azad Kashmiri Punjabi driver, ignited tensions and resulted in riots in Orangi Town of Karachi. Mobs, especially university students, attacked ethnic Pashtuns and policemen, blaming the ethnic group for car accidents in the city, resulting in the killings of over 100 people. During the riots, the APMSO printed and distributed inflammatory pamphlets against the ethnic group, grounding the city to a halt and shutting down educational institutions. On September 30, 1988, hundreds of people, mostly Muhajirs, were killed in Hyderabad, Sindh. The death toll was above 250, and the attacks are said to have been coordinated and carried out by Sindhi Nationalist militants. Unidentified gunmen opened fire on large crowds of bystanders, The MQM accused Qadir Magsi and Sindhudesh supporters carrying out the attack.

The following day Sindhis were killed in ethnic rioting which killed at least 46 people. A curfew was enforced in both Karachi and Hyderabad. In total over 200+ people died by MQM retaliation in the span of two days. In 1990, in response to the Pucca Qila Operation by the Sindh Police, which caused the deaths of anywhere from 70 to 250 Muhajirs civilians and forced the Pakistan Army to be deployed in order to stop the massacre, MQM-affiliated militants conducted retaliatory attacks which led to the deaths of 130 people.

== Extortion ==
The MQM's initial source of funding relied on Zakat, voluntary donations from its members. However, in the 1990s, the MQM adopted a new approach called "Bhatta" or forced tax and protection money collection from commercial areas in Karachi. The party also resorted to illegal funding methods such as bank robberies in 1988. The "Bhatta" mafia extorted money from various professionals, including traders, businessmen, bankers, doctors, teachers, construction workers, and religious figures. This funding scheme blurred the lines between politics and crime in Karachi, as some criminal groups transformed into political parties' armed wings.

== Attacks on journalists ==
MQM had allegedly resorted to violence against journalists and media outlets critical of the party's violent activities. Starting from 1991, the MQM engaged in destructive activities against newspapers that criticized them, with members of the group involved in looting and burning down offices. The management of Herald publications in Karachi had to suspend the distribution of the Dawn newspaper on 21 March, 1991, after what it called a week-long "terror campaign" carried out by the MQM which involved abductions, intimidation, and attacks against newspaper vendors, distributors, and hawkers.

== Pakka Qila Operation (26, 27 May 1990) ==
Operation was launched by Sindh Police to target MQM workers in Pakka Qilla, Hyderabad. Over 250 besieged innocent men, women, children were massacred during the operation which carried on for 275 hours before Pakistan Army eventually moved in on orders of the President in order to stop the massacre.
