= Terrorist incidents in Pakistan in 2014 =

This is a list of terrorist incidents in Pakistan in 2014.

== January – March ==
- 1 January — A bomb blasted on the Qambrani road in Akhtarabad, Quetta near a bus, which was carrying at least 50 pilgrims from Iran to Pakistan. Police confirmed that three of the passengers are killed and at least twenty-four injured.
- 6 January - A student Aitzaz Hasan prevented a suicide bomber from entering his school at Hangu village.
- 9 January - A car suicide-bomb was blasted by Tehrik-i-Taliban Pakistan near the car of a senior police officer Chaudhry Aslam Khan, in which Khan was killed with two others.
- 19 January -
  - Six military personnel and eight civilians were killed in a suicide bombing in a town near the headquarters of the Pakistan Army. According to the BBC, "Soldiers and paramilitary forces were planning to leave the town of Bannu, in Khyber Pakhtunkhwa province, for Razmak in North Waziristan, when their convoy was hit by the blast." Also according to the BBC, "Police say a group of soldiers had been passing on foot at the moment of Monday's explosion in Rawalpindi."
  - 13 people including five security personnel were killed and 29 others injured after a suicide bomber exploded himself at R.A Bazar in Rawalpindi.
  - 2014 Bannu bombing
- 21 January - 2014 Mastung bus bombing
- 2 February - 2014 Peshawar cinema bombings
- 9 February - 8 people killed and 8 injured in a grenade attack, followed by a shooting, at a gathering at a Sufi shrine in Karachi.
- 1 March — A bomb killed at least 11 people and injured another 10 in Federally Administered Tribal Areas.
- 3 March - An attack at the district court in sector F-8 in Islamabad killed at least 11 people. Several gunmen attacked the court's premises and detonated two explosive devices (possibly one suicide bomber). Responsibility for the attack was claimed by a splinter group of the Tehreek-i-Taliban Pakistan, called Ahrarul Hind.

== April – August ==
- 8 April - At least 16 people were killed when militants detonated an IED on a train at Sibi railway station. The separatist United Baloch Army claimed responsibility for the attack.
- 9 April - At least 24 people were killed when militants detonated an explosive device at a vegetable market in sector I-11 in Islamabad. The separatist United Baloch Army claimed responsibility for the attack.
- 8 June - At least 24 people were killed when militants attacked a bus carrying Shia pilgrims from Iran to Quetta in Balochistan province of Pakistan.
- 8 June — Jinnah International Airport attack
  - At least 30 people were killed when terrorists attacked Jinnah International Airport in Karachi on the night of June 8. The 10 Militants were killed in a combat that lasted for 5 hours.
- 11 June — Tirah air strike
  - At least 25 suspected militants were killed and 15 injured when military planes bombed their hideouts in Tirah valley of Khyber Agency
- 11 June — Five killed in separate clashes near Swat Valley
  - In the first incident, unidentified men fired at a car in the Kooza Bandi village of Swat Valley, killing three people including a police guard.
  - In a separate incident, up to six militants stormed a checkpoint in the northwestern town of Dargai, that lies in the Malakand region neighbouring Swat. Two Levies personnel were killed in the attack, Express News reported.
- 15 August 2014- 2014 Quetta Airbase attack, 12 Militants, and 11 persons injured after a failed attack on PAF bases in Quetta

== September - December ==
- 6 September - Pakistani Navy frigate PNS Zulfiquar was attacked and briefly captured by al-Qaeda and rogue Pakistani Navy officers before being recaptured by Pakistani forces. The attack was intended to use the Zulfiquar's anti ship missiles to attack the U.S. Navy fleet in the Arabian Sea. 10 militants which included 4 rogue Pakistani navy officers were killed in the ensuing operation to recapture the ship. One rogue officer detonated a suicide bomb inside the ship after being surrounded. 4 other officers who were involved but who did not participate in the attack were later apprehended.
- 2 November - 2014 Wagah border suicide attack: An attack on the Wagah Border, close to the Pakistani city of Lahore and the Indian city of Amritsar killed more than 60 people with more than 110 injured. There were no initial claims of responsibility.
- 7 November At least 6 people were killed and 4 wounded in two explosions in Mohmand Agency.
- 16 December 2014 Peshawar school massacre: At least 132 children among over 141 killed by Taliban militants who stormed an army-run school in Peshawar city. Seven militants were also killed during the SSG rescue operation
- 18 December At least 3 paramilitary soldiers died from a roadside bomb in Bajaur Agency, Federally Administered Tribal Areas
