= 1984 Pakistan coup attempt =

- Part of Military coups in Pakistan
Date	1982–1984
Location	Pakistan
Result	Failed coup: Coup plotters arrested

Belligerents
Government of Pakistan	Fraction of the Army; Supported by India(Alleged)

Commanders and leaders
Zia ul Haq (President of Pakistan)	Major Aftab; Mustafa Khar; Raza Kazim

In 1984, Zia ul Haq regime faced another attempt of coup d'état just four years after the 1980 attempt. This time the coup attempt came from leftists who wanted to overthrow Zia and establish a populist military regime in the country. The attempt was foiled by Inter Services Intelligence and all the plotters were arrested.

== Plotters ==
The plot had its initiation in 1982 when Major Aftab along with another major in Pakistan army, met with lawyer, philosopher and Marxist sympathiser, Raza Kazim at his residence. Kazim was imprisoned just an year before for publishing a pamphlet against Zia ul Haq. The majors began expressing their dissatisfaction towards the regime of Zia ul Haq, but the majors did not inform Kazim that they were planning to organise a coup against Zia. These majors, along with a member of the Pakistan leftist intelligentsia, Ali Mehmood, continued to have secret meetings with Kazim. Moreover, Mustafa Khar, a former minister in the Zulfiqar Ali Bhutto regime and a senior member of the Pakistan People's Party also got in contact with the plotters from his exile in the UK. Khar was requested by the plotters to help them overthrow Zia. Moreover, Kazim was also asked to talk to some other anti-Zia officers in the military about history, philosophy and politics. It is not known exactly how the plotters had planned to execute the coup and how many officers in planning it. But according to Kazim, over 500 military officers and soldiers were interrogated by the military intelligence apparatus.

== Funding ==
In late 1982, the plotters began collecting funds to organise exiled Pakistani leftists in the UK. They plotters also planned that this money would also be used to stir up protests against the Zia ul Haq regime in Pakistan. Kazim was a successful lawyer, and he agreed to give the plotters over Rs. 90,000 for the planned coup d'état against the Zia regime.

== Motive ==
Kazim in an interview told the Pakistan monthly magazine, Herald, that the plotters were planning to topple Zia and establish a populist military regime (headed by Major Aftab). Moreover, Khar had also suggested to the coup plotters that once the coup is successful Kazim should be given an important post in the new regime.

== Arrest of plotters ==
In 1984, that Kazim realised that the coup was nipped in the bud by military intelligence apparatus before its planned execution. Seth Abid played as double agent and informing the military about the plot. All the conspirators were arrested, including Kazim. They were Court martialed in attock and were all given heavy jail sentences, but were released in 1988 by the first Benazir Bhutto government.

== Indian involvement ==
Allegedly, some disgruntled army officers were provided details of a safe house where weapons procured from India directly by Mustafa Khar after negotiating with an Indian agent in their London High Commission. This has been discussed in great length and detail by Tehmina Durrani in her award-winning book 'My Feudal Lord' where she admits to playing a passive role under duress of her then husband Mustafa Khar.

== See also ==
- Spillover of Soviet - Afghan war in Pakistan
