= Tanai incident =

- Part of the Pakistan-United States skirmishes
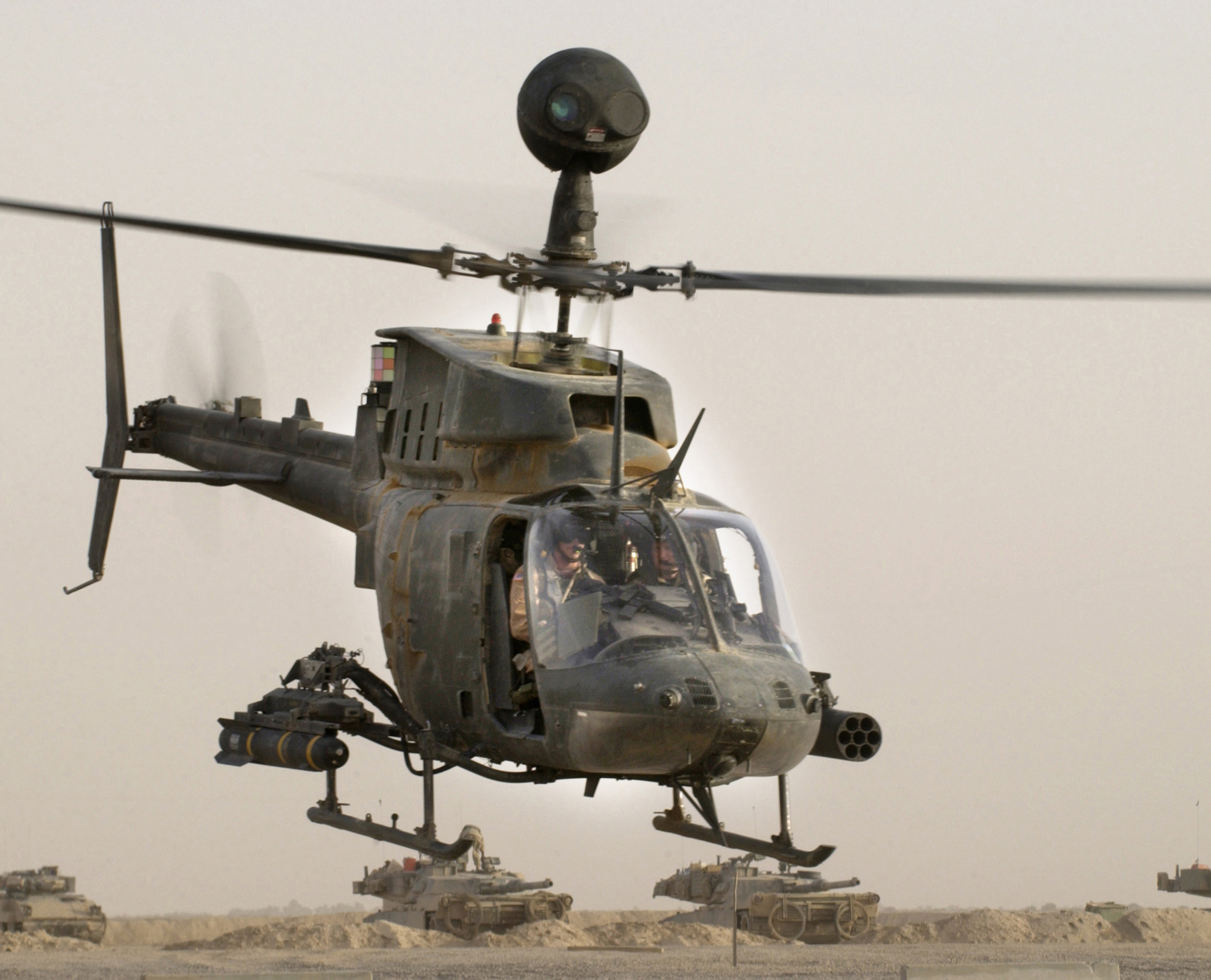
- An American OH-58 Kiowa, used during the skirmish
Date	25 September 2008
Location	Afghanistan–Pakistan border

Belligerents
United States ▪︎United States Army	Pakistan ▪︎Pakistan Army

Strength
2 OH-58 Kiowa helicopters U.S. Troops (Unknown Numbers Of Troops)	Pakistanis Troops (Unknown Numbers Of Troops)

Casualties and losses
None	None

On 25 September 2008 Pakistani troops fired on two American OH-58 Kiowa reconnaissance helicopters. U.S. ground troops, who the helicopters were supporting, returned fire. No one was injured on either side and the helicopters were undamaged. American and NATO officials asserted that the helicopters were flying within Afghan territory to protect an armed patrol. Pakistani officials declared that the helicopters were inside Pakistani territory and were fired upon by "flares" as a warning.
