= 2010 Darra Adam Khel mosque bombing =

Terrorist incident in Pakistan

Coordinates: 34.962779°N 72.373123°E

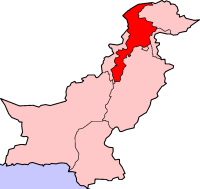
- The location of Khyber Pakhtunkhwa within Pakistan
- Location: Darra Adam Khel, Khyber Pakhtunkhwa, Pakistan
- Date: 5 November 2010
- Attack type: Suicide bombing
- Deaths: 66
- Injuries: 80+
- Perpetrator: Tehrik-i-Taliban Pakistan

The 2010 Darra Adam Khel mosque bombing occurred on 5 November 2010, when at least 66 people were killed by a suicide bomb attack in a mosque in the town of Darra Adam Khel, Khyber Pakhtunkhwa, Pakistan. 80 others were wounded as worshippers offered Jumu'ah, the congregational Friday prayers. The mosque, which belonged to the predominant Sunni denomination, was frequented by tribal elders; according to sources, the bomber may have been targeting a local politician who was known for speaking out against the Taliban. The attack was the deadliest after the September 2010 Quetta bombing in Balochistan, which targeted a procession of Shi'a Muslims. Just a few hours after the attack, three grenades were thrown at another mosque in Peshawar; the blasts killed 5 and wounded 24.
