= Operation al-Mizan =

Military campaign in North Waziristan

- Part of the Insurgency in Khyber Pakhtunkhwa
- North Waziristan is the yellow colored region
Date	2002 – 2006
Location	North Waziristan
Result	Pakistani victory

Belligerents
Pakistan	Al-Qaeda; Pro-Taliban Pakistani mujahideen; Taliban; Haqqani Network

Commanders and leaders
Pervez Musharraf; Safdar Hussain	Naik Mohammed †; Noor Muhammad; Haji Mohammad Sharif; Maulvi Nazir; Baitullah Mehsud

Units involved
Pakistan Armed Forces; Pakistan Army; XI Corps; Frontier Corps; FCKP(S)	Militants

Strength
70,000-80,000	10,000

Casualties and losses
1,000 dead, 1,400 wounded and 200 Chechens, Uzbeks, and Arabs wounded, dead or missing	

Operation al-Mizan (English: Operation Justice) was a series of strategic military campaigns conducted by the Pakistan Army and United States special operations forces from 2002 to 2006. It continued for five years in various phases, several other operations including the Operation Carlosa II. Al-Mizan was the first major operation of Pakistani troops to combat foreign militant outfits in North Waziristan of North-West Frontier Province. An estimate of 70,000 to 80,000 troops were deployed in affected areas.

The operation was conducted when Pakistani and NATO forces were severely targeted by militants crossing the Afghanistan-Pakistan border in the aftermath of the United States invasion of Afghanistan in 2001. The most militancy-affected areas were Federally Administered Tribal Areas (FATA) and Provincially Administered Tribal Areas (PATA) before the operation was initiated.

== Background ==
Operation al-Mizan was conducted by the United States and Pakistan to combat Al-Qaeda, Taliban and other foreign militant organizations who were carrying out their activities in Waziristan after the 2001 United States invasion of Afghanistan forced them to cross the Pakistani border and flee Afghan territory. The operation was aided by 100,000 to 80,000 troops, 20 Infantry battalion, six combat engineer battalion, one Special Service Group, two Signal corps, and 39 Frontier Corps contingents. All units were commanded under the eight brigade headquarters stationed at two divisions.

== Casualties ==
The operation caused significant losses from the both sides with over 1,400 casualties and killed hundreds of militants, including Al Qaeda leaders. Taliban militants targeted military convoys that caused heavy losses on military. They also launched several well-planned attacks to involve the troops in direct combat. The operation was not limited to Al-Qaeda and Taliban, more than 200 Chechens, Uzbeks, and Arabs, including their local supporter, were targeted during the military campaign. It is considered one of the major operations that killed 1,000 Pakistani troops before the conflict was ended in 2006.
