= Kurram incident =

2010 American-Pakistani skirmish

- Part of the Pakistan-United States skirmishes
Date	30 September 2010
Location	Afghanistan-Pakistan border
Result	Pakistani diplomatic victory: Pakistan closes NATO supply route; US apologizes for the incident

Belligerents
United States	Pakistan ▪︎ Frontier Corps

Strength
U.S. Attack Helicopters (Unknown Numbers)	Frontier Corps (Unknown Numbers Of Troops)

Casualties and losses
Possible Helicopters Damages	3 killed 3 wounded

On 30 September 2010, U.S. helicopters entered Pakistani airspace after ground troops determined that a mortar attack by militants in Pakistan was imminent, according to the Coalition. Pakistani Frontier Corps troops manning the Mandata Kadaho border post fired warning shots, and the helicopters responded by firing two missiles that destroyed the post. Three soldiers were killed and another three wounded. Pakistan responded by closing a key NATO supply route for eleven days.
