= Afghan SCUD attacks in Pakistan =

SCUD missile attacks in Pakistan

- Part of Pakistan-Afghanistan skirmishes, Afghan Civil War (1989–1992), KHAD-KGB campaign in Pakistan and Battle of Jalalabad (1989)
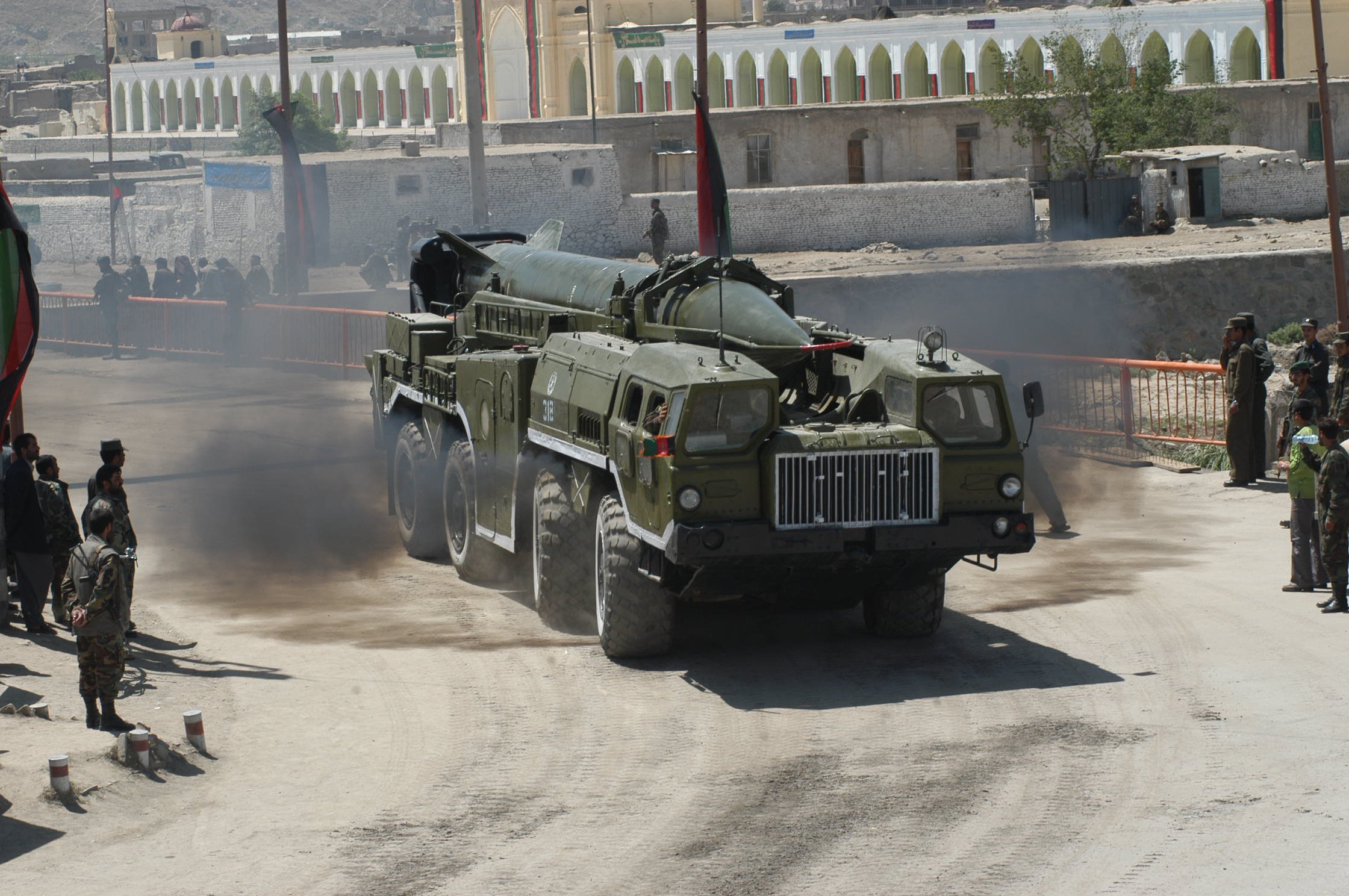
- The Scud ballistic missile in Afghanistan
Date	April 6, 1989 – November 28, 1990
Location	Khyber Pakhtunkhwa and Punjab, Pakistan

Belligerents
Afghanistan	Pakistan

Commanders and leaders
(Afghanistan) Mohammad Najibullah	(Pakistan) Benazir Bhutto (Until 1990) (Pakistan) Ghulam Mustafa Jatoi (1990) (Pakistan) Nawaz Sharif (1990)

Units involved
Afghan Air Force; 99th Missile Brigade	Pakistan Army; Air Defence Corps

Casualties and losses
None	35+ dead 50+ wounded
- 6 Afghan refugees killed 22 Afghan refugees injured

The Afghan SCUD campaign in Pakistan refers to multiple strikes by Afghanistan using SCUD missiles supplied by the Soviet Union against the Mujahideen, but in multiple instances, these missiles struck Afghan refugee camps and other areas in Pakistan for its covert support of the mujahideen in Operation Cyclone. In total, 17 missiles struck Pakistan, leading to more than 35 deaths and multiple injures.

== Background ==
After the Soviet withdrawal from Afghanistan and the end of the Soviet–Afghan War, the Democratic Republic of Afghanistan was engaged in a civil war without any direct contact with the Soviet. They were supplied 2000 SCUD missiles by Soviets which were to be used against Mujahideen forces, but in many cases these missiles struck Pakistan, which was supporting the Mujahideen.

== Strikes in 1989 ==
=== 6 April 1989 strike ===
On the night of Thursday April 6, 1989, a SCUD missile hit a post office in the border town of Torkham, no casualties were reported but the post office was damaged. This was the first SCUD attack on Pakistan by Afghanistan. Afghanistan claimed that this strike was not intentional, and was an accident as it was directed on the town of Jalalabad where the Battle of Jalalabad was taking place between the Afghan Armed Forces and Mujahideen.

=== 4 May 1989 strike ===
On Thursday May 4, 1989, at 8:20, a SCUD missile was launched by Afghanistan which struck near Kharruba Afghan Refugee Camp, in Bannu District, killing three Afghan refugees and injuring 17 others.

=== 22 May 1989 strike ===
On Monday May 22, 1989, an Afghan SCUD missile struck near Bhakkar in the Punjab province. This strike which was the third strike, ignited severe tensions between the Pakistan and Afghanistan who accused one to another of sabotaging their peace efforts.

=== 23–26 June 1989 strikes ===
On Friday June 23, 1989, at 6:45 in the evening, a missile fired by the Afghanistan struck near Khardand in Mazro Kandau. No casualties were reported.

On Saturday June 24, 1989, at 5:50 in the evening another missile fired by Afghanistan struck in Batagram. No casualties were reported.

On Monday June 26, 1989, at 8:30 in the morning a SCUD missile launched by Afghanistan struck Teri post in Spina Shagah. No casualties were reported.

=== 3 August 1989 strike ===
On Thursday August 3, 1989, at 5:20 in the evening a SCUD missile fired by Afghanistan struck the village of Nartopa near Haripur. 6 civilians were injured, 4 homes were completely destroyed and 13 were damaged.

=== 15 August 1989 strike ===
On August 15, 1989, at 8:45 in the morning another SCUD missile struck an area in the Kurram Agency. However, no casualties were reported.

=== 1 October 1989 strike ===
On Sunday October 1, 1989, at 8:15 at night, a SCUD missile launched by Afghanistan struck near Adam Khel in North Waziristan Agency. No casualties were reported.

=== 27 October 1989 strike ===
On Friday October 27, 1989, a SCUD missile launched by Afghanistan struck Teri Mangal in Kurram Agency. No casualties were reported.

== Strikes in 1990 ==
=== 10 January 1990 strike ===
On Wednesday January 10, 1990, at 1:40 in the afternoon a SCUD missile launched by Afghanistan struck Hisar Village, in Attock District.

=== 14 June 1990 strike ===
On Thursday June 14, 1990, at 2 in the morning, a SCUD missile launched by Afghanistan struck Teri Mangal in Kurram Agency injuring an Afghan refugee.

=== 26 June 1990 strike ===
On Tuesday June 26, 1990, at 4:15 in the evening a SCUD missile launched by Afghanistan struck Peiwar Kotal, Kurram Agency injuring 4 Afghan refugees.

=== 13 September 1990 strike ===
On Thursday September 13, 1990, a SCUD missile launched by Afghanistan struck near Shahdal, Kurram Agency. However, no casualties were reported.

=== 20 November 1990 strike ===
On November 20, 1990, at 10:35 in the morning a SCUD missile launched by Afghanistan struck near Awal Khan, Khyber Agency. However no casualties were reported.

=== 28 November 1990 strike ===
On Wednesday November 28, 1990, at 3:40 in the afternoon two SCUD missiles launched by Afghanistan struck Teri Mangal in Kurram Agency. This was the largest and the deadliest Afghan strike on Pakistani land killing 28 people including 3 Afghan refugees and injuring 15 others.

== See also ==
- Soviet–Afghan War
- Raids inside the Soviet Union during the Soviet–Afghan War
- Foreign involvement in the Soviet–Afghan War
