= 2014 Bannu bombing =

Terror attack in Pakistan by the Taliban

2014 Bannu Bombing
- Location: Bannu, Pakistan
- Date: 19 January 2014
- Attack type: Bomb blast
- Deaths: 26
- Injuries: 38
- Perpetrator: Tehrik-i-Taliban Pakistan

The 2014 Bannu Bombing was a bombing attack by the Taliban that killed twenty six Pakistani soldiers. Thirty-eight other people were injured as a result of the bombing.

== History ==
The bomb was first placed in an eighteen-seater van. The bomb then hit an army convoy which killed many Pakistani soldiers. The vehicle where many of the soldiers were was being rented by the Frontier Corps. The vehicle was traveling to Razmak, in North Waziristan. The bomb exploded at an army checkpoint. Fifteen of the twenty security officers that were injured were taken to the Bannu Combined Military Hospital in critical condition.

== Reaction ==
According to TTP spokesman Shahidullah Shahid, "The bombing was carried out to (avenge) the killing of Maulana Waliur Rehman, commander of TTP South Waziristan, who was killed on May 29, 2013, in a U.S. drone strike in Miranshah." The Prime Minister of Pakistan, Nawaz Sharif, canceled a trip to Davos, Switzerland that he had planned.

== Retaliation ==
As a result of the bombing, helicopters operated by the Pakistan Army fired missiles, resulting in the deaths of three militants and two children. The helicopters fired at a road in the village of Musaki.
