= 1980 Pakistan coup attempt =

Failed coup led by Tajammul Hussain Malik

- Part of Military coups in Pakistan
Date	March 1980
Location	Pakistan
Result	Failed coup: Coup plotters arrested

Belligerents
Government of Pakistan	Fraction of the Army

Commanders and leaders
Zia-ul-Haq (President of Pakistan)	Tajammul Hussain Malik; Naveed Tajammal; Malik Riaz

In 1980, Tajammul Hussain Malik organised a coup attempt against the military regime of Zia-ul-Haq, with many other senior army officers, including his son Naveed Tajammul. The plan was to assassinate Zia-ul-Haq during the Pakistan Day parade on 23 March 1980, however the plot was exposed and Malik, his son (Naveed Tajammal) and the other conspirators were arrested and sentenced to rigorous life imprisonment.

== History ==
In 1977, Zia ul Haq came to power via the coup against the elected government of Zulfiqar Ali Bhutto and imposed martial law on the country. He established a semi-Islamist regime in the country. Tajammul Hussain Malik aimed to replace his fake "Islamist" regime with a fully theocratic one.

== Plot ==
The plot was to assassinate Zia-ul-Haq and launch a coup to depose the government with an Islamic one. The attempted assassination and coup were planned for 23 March 1980, during the annual 23 March Pakistan Day Parade. The masterminds behind the coup were high-ranking military and intelligence officers, and were led by Major General Tajammal Hussain Malik; his son Captain Naveed; and his nephew Major Riaz, a former military intelligence officer.

== Failure ==
The ISI became aware of this plot but decided against arresting the men outright because they did not know how deep the conspiracy went, and kept them under strict surveillance. As the date of the annual parade approached, the ISI was satisfied that it had identified the major players in the conspiracy and arrested the men along with some high-ranking military officers.

== Arrest of coup plotters ==
Malik, his son (Naveed Tajammal) and the other conspirators were arrested and sentenced to rigorous life imprisonment. Though offered chances of exile, even when the risk of being executed was high, General Malik and his son (Naveed Tajammal) never took the offer to be exiled and preferred their homeland. Malik was released from imprisonment in 1988 following the death of Zia-ul-Haq in a plane crash.
