= Pucca Qila Operation =

1990 operation in Hyderabad

Pucca Qila Massacre
- Part of MQM militancy
- Location: Hyderabad, Sindh
- Date: 27 May 1990
- Target: MQM-L
- Attack type: Mass shooting, Massacre
- Deaths: 70
- Victims: Muhajir women and children
- Perpetrator: Sindh Police
- Defenders: Ghulam Ishaq Khan; Pakistan Army

Pucca Qila Operation, also called the Pucca Qila Massacre was an operation launched by Sindh Police on the orders of PPP-led Sindh government against MQM party workers and ordinary protesters in the Pucca Qila area of Hyderabad city. The operation resulted in the deaths of more than 70 people, mostly women and children. The incident resulted in the dismissal of the Benazir Bhutto government by President Ghulam Ishaq Khan, allegedly on the directives of military.

== Background ==
On 14 May, a dispute between different ethnic groups of students over special exam quotas escalated into clashes that spread to the entire city center and resulted in the deaths of three people and a curfew which was enforced for eleven days. On the eleventh day, 25 May, the government sent the police, consisting of several forces from predominantly rural districts surrounding Hyderabad, to Pucca Qila, a Muhajir dominated neighbourhood, where they attempted to establish a police station within the walls of the citadel and to clear it of weapons. The police besieged the area, closed off all exits, entered houses in search of weaponry and shot at people breaking curfew and leaving their houses. Gun battles broke out between the Sindh police and MQM militants who had arrived to lift the siege and local MQM party workers who attempted to resist the searches, leading to an escalation of tension in Pucca Qila area. As a result of the siege, the water supply from the water tower in the citadel was cut off, disrupting the water supply in large sections of Hyderabad.

== Massacre ==
On May 27, 10 o'clock, a rally of Muhajir women and children started marching from Latifabad to demand the restoration of water supply in Pucca Qila and lift of the 300 hour long siege. The procession, when challenged to stop, dared the police to open fire, because they were carrying the Quran on their heads. The police opened fire, causing a stampede, with the Muhajir women and children rushing into the Abdul Wahab Shah Jilani Shrine for shelter. Twenty-four ambulances arrived and carried off the dead and the wounded to nearby hospitals, first to Bhittai Hospital-which had only one operation theatre, which forced surgeons to operate on patients in the corridors before moving the victims to the St. Elizabeth and Mohammadi hospitals. The massacre and siege ended when Pakistan Army moved into Hyderabad and dismissed the PPP-led government.

== Aftermath ==
=== Protests ===
Protests broke out after the massacre where slogans of death were chanted to the administration, the President Ghulam Ishq Khan, Prime Minister Benazir Bhutto, and the Sindh Police.

=== Ousting of Benazir Bhutto ===
The massacre resulted in a rift between Prime Minister Benazir Bhutto, Chief of Army Staff Mirza Aslam Beg and MQM leader Altaf Hussain, which resulted in President Ghulam Ishaq Khan and General Mirza Aslam Beg dismissing Bhutto from office.

== Legacy ==
On 27 May 2017, the 27th anniversary of Pucca Qila, MQM's official Pakistan faction demanded an independent inquiry into the 1990 Hyderabad Pucca Qila tragedy.

== See also ==
- MQM Militancy
- MQM insurrection (1994-2016)
- Jinnahpur
- Insurgency in Sindh
- Operation Clean-up
