= Peshawar attack =

Peshawar attack may refer to these attacks in Peshawar, Khyber Pakhtunkhwa, Pakistan especially during the insurgency in Khyber Pakhtunkhwa:

- 1994 Peshawar school bus hijacking
- 1995 Peshawar bombing
- 2007 Peshawar hotel bombing
- 2008 Peshawar bombings
- 2009 Peshawar bombing (disambiguation)
  - Pearl Continental hotel bombing in June 2009
  - 9 October 2009 Peshawar bombing
  - 28 October 2009 Peshawar bombing
  - 2009 Peshawar judicial complex bombing
- 2010 Peshawar bombing (disambiguation)
  - 5 April 2010 North-West Frontier Province attacks
  - 19 April 2010 Peshawar bombing
- March 2011 Peshawar bombing
- May 2011 Peshawar bombing
- June 2011 Peshawar bombings
- 2012 Bacha Khan International Airport attack
- 2013 Peshawar mosque attack
- June 2013 Pakistan bombings
- September 2013 Peshawar bombings (disambiguation)
  - Peshawar church bombing
  - Qissa Khwani Bazaar bombing
- 2014 Peshawar cinema bombings
- 2014 Peshawar school massacre
- 2015 Peshawar mosque attack
- 2015 Camp Badaber attack
- 2016 Peshawar bus bombing
- 2016 Bacha Khan University attack
- 2017 Hayatabad suicide bombing
- May 2017 Peshawar bombings
- 2017 Peshawar police vehicle attack
- 2017 Peshawar Agriculture Directorate attack
- 2018 Peshawar suicide bombing
- 2020 Peshawar school bombing
- 2022 Peshawar mosque attack
- 2023 Peshawar blast (disambiguation)
  - 2023 Peshawar mosque bombing
  - Sarband police station attack

== See also ==
- Peshawar (disambiguation)
- Peshawar mosque attack (disambiguation)
- Peshawar school attack (disambiguation)
- Qissa Khwani massacre (1930), by British troops in Peshawar, British India against unarmed civilian freedom fighters
