= Timeline of Peshawar =

Coordinates: 34.016667°N 71.583333°E

The following is a timeline of the history of the city of Peshawar, Khyber Pakhtunkhwa, Pakistan.

== Prior to 19th century ==
- 127 CE - Purushapura becomes eastern capital of Buddhist kingdom Gandhara (approximate date).
- 978 CE - Sabaktagin defeats Jayapala.
- 1001 - 27 November: Battle of Peshawar; Mahmud of Ghazni in power.
- 1006 - Mahmud of Ghazni defeats Anandapala.
- 1180 - Mu'izz-Ud-Din Muhammad Ibn Sam in power.
- 1630 - Mohabbat Khan Mosque built.
- 1758 - 8 May: Battle of Peshawar; Marathas in power.

== 19th century ==
- 1809 - Mountstuart Elphinstone arrives as ambassador to Shah Shujah.
- 1810 - Wazir Bagh (garden) laid out.
- 1825 - Sikh Ranjit Singh in power.
- 1834
  - Hari Singh Nalwa in power.
  - Bala Hissar (fort) rebuilt.
- 1838 - Italian Paolo Avitabile in power.
- 1849
  - British in power.
  - Gorak Nath Temple built.
- 1850s - Grand Trunk Road Lahore-Peshawar extension constructed (approximate date).
- 1851 - Peshawar cemetery established.
- 1860 - Flood.
- 1867 - Municipality constituted.
- 1868
  - British Peshawar Cantonment laid out near city.
  - Population: 56,589 (city); 58,555 (municipality).
- 1881 - Population: 79,982.
- 1882 - Sethi Mohallah residence built.
- 1883 - All Saints Church opens in cantonment.
- 1891 - Population: 54,191.
- 1900
  - Cunningham clock tower built.
  - Edwardes College established.

== 20th century ==
- 1901
  - City becomes capital of the North-West Frontier Province.
  - Population: 95,147.
- 1906 - Victoria Hall built.
- 1907 - Peshawar Museum founded.
- 1909 - Ancient Buddhist Kanishka casket discovered by archaeologists in Shah-ji-Dheri near city.
- 1913 - Islamia College established.
- 1922 - Kapoor Haveli (residence) built.
- 1925 - Khaiber railway built.
- 1930
  - 23 April: Qissa Khwani Bazaar massacre.
  - Novelty cinema opens.
- 1932 - Khyber Mail newspaper begins publication.
- 1934 - Landsdowne cinema opens.
- 1936 - Radio station begins broadcasting.
- 1939 - Al Falah newspaper begins publication.
- 1941
  - Al-Jamiat-e-Sarhad newspaper begins publication.
  - Population: 130,967.

=== Independence: since 1947 ===
- 1947 - City becomes part of the Dominion of Pakistan.
- 1948 - City becomes capital of the Peshawar province.
- 1949 - Frontier Corps military reserve headquartered in Bala Hissar (fort).
- 1950
  - University of Peshawar established.
  - Shahab-e-saqib and Qallandar Urdu-language newspapers begin publication.
- 1951 - Population: 151,776.
- 1954 - Khyber Medical College established.
- 1955
  - City becomes part of West Pakistan.
  - The Statesman English-language newspaper begins publication.
  - Abasin Arts Society established.
- 1956 - City becomes part of the Islamic Republic of Pakistan.
- 1958 - Amal newspaper begins publication.
- 1964 - Peshawar Press Club founded.
- 1965 - Bacha Khan International Airport in operation.
- 1972 - Population: 268,366.
- 1975
  - Qayyum Stadium opens.
  - Hayatabad suburb established.
- 1976 - Wahdat Pashto-language newspaper begins publication.
- 1977 - Shahādat newspaper begins publication.
- 1980 - May: Explosion at Jamiat Islami Afghanistan headquarters.
- 1981
  - Population: 555,000.
  - Kacha Garhi refugee camp established near city.
- 1982
  - Jalozai Afghan refugee camp in operation.
  - Afghan Islamic Press news agency established.
- 1984 - Mujāhid Wulas newspaper begins publication.
- 1985
  - Karkhano Market and Nishtar Hall established.
  - The Frontier Post (English-language) newspaper begins publication.
- 1987 - Frontier Times in publication (approximate date).
- 1994 - Bus hijacking.
- 1995 - Bombing.
- 1996 - Qalb-e-Asia Cultural Centre established.
- 1998 - Population: 982,816.

== 21st century ==
- 2004 - Peshawar Panthers cricket team formed.
- 2007 - 15 May: suicide Hotel bombing.
- 2008 - 6 September and 5 December: Bombings.
- 2009
  - 5 March: Bombing at Rahman Baba shrine.
  - 9 June: Pearl Continental hotel bombing.
  - 9 October: Bombing in Khyber Bazaar.
  - 28 October: Bombing in Mina Bazar.
  - 19 November: Judicial complex bombing.
- 2010
  - 5 April: attack on the United States consulate.
  - 19 April: Bombing in Qissa Khwani Bazaar.
  - July - August: Flood.
  - Air pollution in Peshawar reaches annual mean of 111 PM2.5 and 540 PM10, much higher than recommended.
- 2011
  - PIA Planetarium inaugurated.
  - Saeed Book Bank closes.
  - 9 March: Suicide bombing.
  - 10 May: Car bombing kills a journalist.
  - 12 June: Double bombing in Khyber market area.
- 2012 - 15 December: Bacha Khan International Airport attack.
- 2013
  - 21 June: Suicide bombing at Shia mosque in Gulshan Colony.
  - 22 September: Double suicide bombing at a church.
  - 29 September: Bombing at Qissa Khwani Bazaar.
- 2014
  - 2 and 11 February: Cinema bombings.
  - 16 December: School massacre.
- 2015 - 13 February: Mosque attack.
- 2016 - 16 March: Bus bombing.
- 2017
  - Population: 1,970,042.
  - 15 February: Hayatabad bombing.
  - 8 May: Bombings.
  - Dengue outbreak.
  - 24 November: Police vehicle attack.
  - 1 December: Agricultural Directorate attack.
- 2018 - 10 July : Bombing.
- 2020 - 27 October: School bombing.
- 2022 - 4 March: Mosque attack.

== See also ==
- History of Peshawar
- Timelines of other cities in Pakistan: Karachi, Lahore
- Urbanisation in Pakistan

== Bibliography ==
Published in 19th century

- Edward Thornton (1844), "Peshawer", Gazetteer of the Countries Adjacent to India on the Northwest, London: W.H. Allen, hdl:2027/nyp.33433000638944, OCLC 6141828
- E.G.G. Hastings (1878), Report on the Settlement of the Peshawar District of the Punjab, Lahore
- "Towns, Municipalities, and Cantonments". Gazetteer of the Peshawar District. 1883. p. 287+. OCLC 663560992.
- David Ross (1883), "Peshawar", Land of the Five Rivers and Sindh: Sketches Historical and Descriptive, London: Chapman and Hall
- Edward Balfour (1885), "Peshawur", Cyclopaedia of India (3rd ed.), London: B. Quaritch
- Edward Thornton (1886), "Peshawar", in Roper Lethbridge and Arthur N. Wollaston (ed.), Gazetteer of the Territories under the Government of the Viceroy of India, London: W. H. Allen & Co., OCLC 710600

Published in 20th century

- The Punjab, its Feudatories, and the North-West Frontier Province. Census of India, 1901. Vol. 17, Part 2. Simla. 1902. Part 1
- "Peshawar City", Imperial Gazetteer of India (New ed.), Oxford: Clarendon Press, 1908
- "Peshawar" . Encyclopædia Britannica. Vol. 21 (11th ed.). 1910. pp. 282–283.
- "Peshawar", Handbook for Travellers in India, Burma, and Ceylon (8th ed.), London: J. Murray, 1911
- "Peshawar". Encyclopaedia of Islam. Leiden: E.J. Brill. 1927. p. 1066. ISBN 9789004097926. OCLC 39715711.
- Peshawar District Gazetteer, Lahore, 1933
- Ahmad Hasan Dani (1969). Peshawar, Historic City of the Frontier. Peshawar. OCLC 556485417.
- Schellinger and Salkin, ed. (1996). "Peshawar". International Dictionary of Historic Places: Asia and Oceania. UK: Routledge. p. 669+. ISBN 9781884964046.

Published in 21st century

- Maneesha Tikekar (2004), "Peshawar", Across the Wagah: an Indian's sojourn in Pakistan, New Delhi: Promilla & Co. in association with Bibliophile South Asia, New Jersey, ISBN 8185002347
- C.C. Davies; C.E. Bosworth (2007). "Peshawar". In C. E. Bosworth (ed.). Historic Cities of the Islamic World. Leiden: Koninklijke Brill. p. 426+. ISBN 9789004153882.
