= Peshawar mosque attack =

Peshawar mosque attack may refer to:

- 2013 Peshawar mosque attack
- 2015 Peshawar mosque attack
- 2022 Peshawar mosque attack
- 2023 Peshawar mosque bombing

== See also ==
- Peshawar attack (disambiguation)
