= 2009 Peshawar bombing =

2009 Peshawar bombing may refer to:

- Pearl Continental hotel bombing, in June
- 9 October 2009 Peshawar bombing
- 28 October 2009 Peshawar bombing
- 2009 Peshawar judicial complex bombing, in November

== See also ==
- Peshawar attack (disambiguation)
