= September 2013 Peshawar bombings =

September 2013 Peshawar bombings may refer to:

- Peshawar church attack (22 September 2013), a twin suicide bomb attack at All Saints Church, Peshawar, Pakistan
- Qissa Khawani Bazaar bombing (29 September 2013), a car bomb attack at the Qissa Khawani Bazaar market in Peshawar, Pakistan

== See also ==
- Peshawar attack (disambiguation)
