= 2023 Peshawar blast =

2023 Peshawar blast may refer to:

- Sarband police station attack
- 2023 Peshawar mosque bombing
- May 2023 Peshawar bombing

== See also ==
- Peshawar attack (disambiguation)
