= 2022 Peshawar mosque attack =

Terrorist attack in Pakistan

- Part of the persecution of Shias by the Islamic State and the insurgency in Khyber Pakhtunkhwa
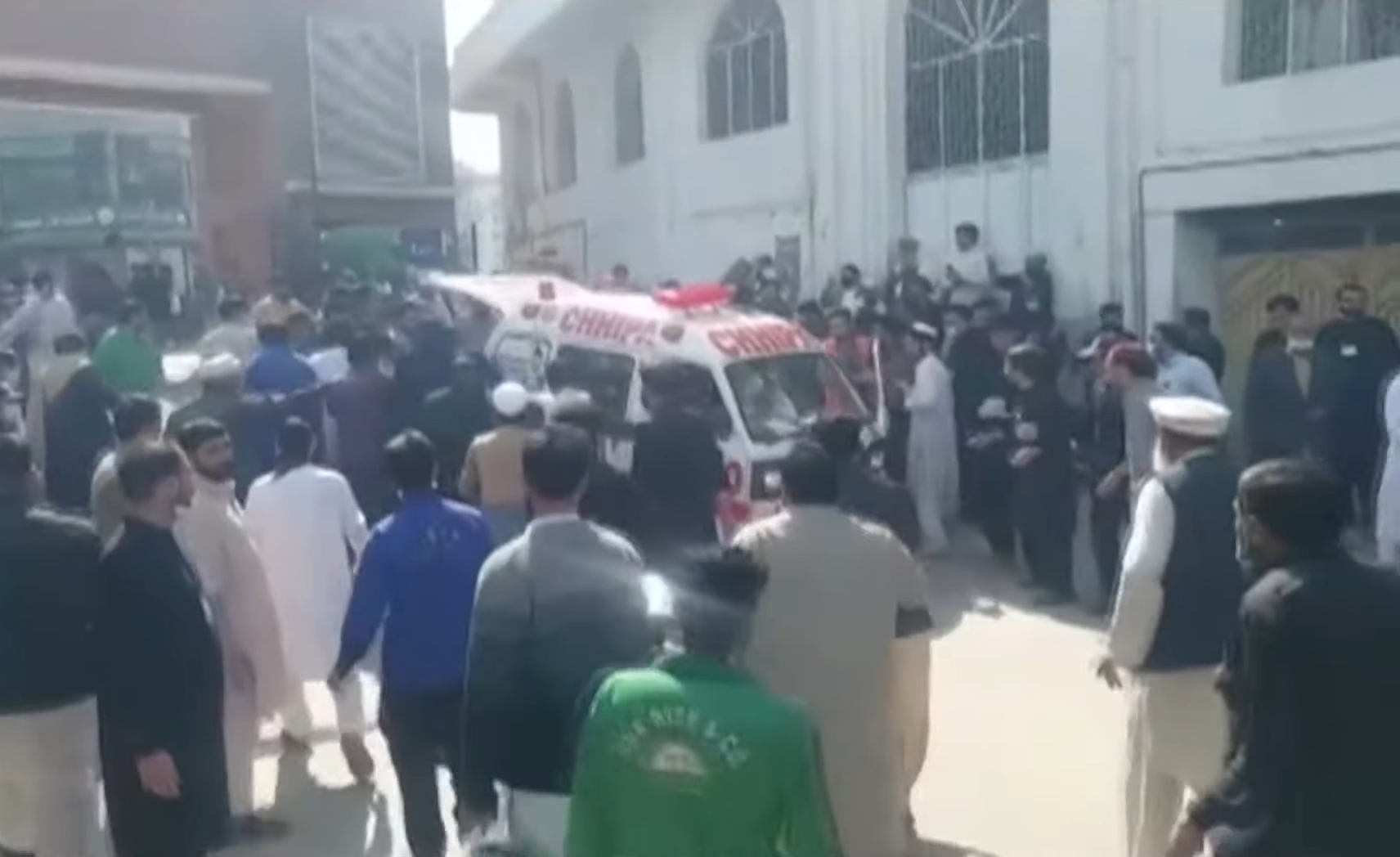
- An ambulance at the mosque after the attack
- Location: 34°00′21.5″N 71°34′13.0″E; Masjid Asna-e-Ashri, Qissa Khwani Bazaar, Peshawar, Khyber Pakhtunkhwa, Pakistan
- Date: 4 March 2022 (4 years ago)
- Target: The Kucha Risaldar Shia mosque
- Attack type: Shooting, suicide bombing
- Deaths: 63 (including the perpetrator)
- Injuries: 196
- Perpetrator: Islamic State – Khorasan Province
- Assailant: Abdurakhoan Boboev
- Motive: Anti-Shi'ism

On 4 March 2022, the Islamic State – Khorasan Province attacked a Shia mosque at Qissa Khwani Bazaar in Peshawar, Pakistan. The suicide attack, carried out by an Afghan man who was a long-term resident of Pakistan, killed at least 63 people and injured another 196.

== Background ==
During the late 20th and early 21st centuries in Pakistan, Islamist and sectarian attacks have been very common, killing thousands of people. In 2004, their attacks intensified into an insurgency in the country's northwest. Many major attacks have occurred in Peshawar, the capital and largest city of Khyber Pakhtunkhwa, a province in Pakistan that borders Afghanistan, including a market bombing in 2009 that killed at least 117. In 2013, an attack on a Shia mosque killed at least 14 people and the suicide bombing of a church killed at least 75. Subsequent attacks included a school massacre in 2014 and another attack on a Shia mosque in 2015. Peshawar experienced "a relative lull" in the years preceding the 2022 attack, but there was otherwise "a significant increase of violence" along military outposts at the border between Pakistan and Afghanistan in the months before the attack.

Kucha Risaldar (alternatively romanized Kocha Risaldar, Kucha Risalda) is a predominantly Shiite neighborhood in the old city of Peshawar. The main mosque there, the target of the attack, is located in the Qissa Khwani Bazaar. It is among the oldest mosques in the area and predates the establishment of Pakistan as a separate state from the British Raj in 1947.

== Attack ==
On 4 March 2022 at 12:55 p.m. Pakistan Standard Time (UTC+5), during Friday prayer, a man dressed in black clothing and armed with a pistol arrived near Masjid Asna-e-Ashri in Kucha Risaldar in a motorized rickshaw with two others. He then proceeded alone (Note: Police initially said two people approached the mosque, but later amended this to one.) towards the building on foot. He shot at police officers outside the building, killing one and fatally wounding another. Five or six shots were fired.

He entered the mosque's main hall and opened fire on the worshippers, who filled the mosque's two floors. Seconds later, he detonated an explosive vest carrying around 150 ball bearings and 5 kilograms (11 lb) of explosives, causing a powerful explosion which ripped through the room. The explosive vest was hidden by his large shawl and the dark color of his clothes. A witness said the attacker detonated the explosives when he reached the minbar, and the police inspector-general said it occurred in the mosque's third row.

== Victims ==
At least 56 or 57 people were initially killed, as well as the perpetrator, and another 196 were injured. Victims were taken to Lady Reading Hospital with 10 arriving "in very critical condition" and 57 dead on arrival. A spokesperson for the hospital said the next day that at least 37 people remained hospitalized with at least four in critical condition and six died overnight, bringing the death toll to 63.

A police official believed that the ball bearings caused the most deaths, and many victims had limbs amputated by shrapnel. Among the dead was prayer leader Allama Irshad Hussein Khalil, described by AP News as "a prominent up and coming young Shiite leader". Two officers who were wounded as the attacker approached the mosque died at the scene.

It was the deadliest attack in Pakistan since the Islamic State's 2018 election rally bombing in Mastung, Balochistan before being surpassed by the similar 2023 Peshawar mosque bombing.

== Aftermath ==
On 5 March 2022, Islamic State – Khorasan Province claimed responsibility for the attack via Amaq News Agency and identified the suicide bomber as Julaybib al-Kabli. In a news conference the next day, security officials said that this was an alias and they had identified the attacker. The attacker's true name was Abdurakhoan Boboev, who had sheltered in Turkey before traveling to Afghanistan. and security officials said he was an Afghan national, and officials added that he migrated to Pakistan decades ago and was previously reported missing by his parents, who suspected he had joined Islamic State.

Federal Minister for Information and Broadcasting, Fawad Chaudhry, said that three investigation teams were established to investigate the attack, and the provincial government's spokesperson told reporters on 5 March that the driver of the rickshaw had been arrested.

Funerals were held at Kohati Gate for 24 victims in the evening of 4 March 2022, and the next morning. The burials, attended by hundreds, were under strict security, including sniffer dogs and body searches conducted by both police and the Shiite community's own security. The Shiite community, feeling that government security was too lax ahead of the attack, demanded better protection and organized country-wide protests throughout the evening of 4 March to condemn the attack.

== Reactions ==
=== Government ===
Avatar of Imran Khan

Imran Khan
(@ImranKhanPTI)
tweeted:

My deepest condolences go to the victims' families & prayers for the recovery of the injured. I have asked CM KP to personally visit the families & look after their needs.

4 March 2022

Prime Minister of Pakistan Imran Khan condemned the attack on the mosque and said that he was personally overseeing the situation and coordinating relevant agencies.

Interior Minister Sheikh Rasheed Ahmad condemned the attack and described it as part of a conspiracy to create instability during the Australian national cricket team's first visit to the country in twenty-four years. Due to historical security concerns, including the 2009 attack on the Sri Lanka national cricket team, international events had been held mostly in the United Arab Emirates instead. Pakistan began hosting again shortly before the attack, which occurred hours after the tour's opening Test match.

Foreign Minister Shah Mehmood Qureshi claimed that he knew who was responsible for the attack and who was providing the attackers arms and resources with the intent to destabilise Pakistan. Chaudhry described the attack as part of "a big conspiracy" against the country in a statement on Twitter.

=== Others ===
The Khyber Pakhtunkhwa Bar Council declared a strike across all courts in the province on 5 March in solidarity with the victims.

Azad Marshall of the Church of Pakistan condemned the attack and urged the government to better secure and protect freedom of religion, which he described as its "fundamental ethical and legal responsibility".

=== International ===
The United Nations' Resident Coordinator and Humanitarian Coordinator in Pakistan and the Security Council condemned the attack. It was also condemned by the governments of Egypt, Iran, Saudi Arabia, the United Arab Emirates, and the United States. The Taliban government in Afghanistan also condemned the attack through spokesperson Zabihullah Mujahid.

Individual condemnations include the Archbishop of Canterbury Justin Welby, Ammar al-Hakim, Muqtada al-Sadr, and Grand Ayatollah Sistani.

== Encounter of involved terrorists ==
The Counter Terrorism Department (CTD) with the assistance of other law enforcement agencies, killed three terrorists in a raid at Regi Lalma area of the Peshawar-Khyber border in Khyber Pakhtunkhwa on 9 March 2022, while trying to enter the city of Peshawar. According to CTD insiders, the three terrorists were part of a network involved in the suicide attack on Peshawar's Kocha Risaldar imambargah mosque and involved in other attacks on law enforcement agencies, including killings of police personnel. Automatic weapons, grenades and ammunition were also recovered during the raid.

== See also ==
- List of terrorist incidents linked to Islamic State – Khorasan Province
- 2023 Peshawar mosque bombing
