= 2010 Peshawar bombing =

2010 Peshawar bombing may refer to:

- 5 April 2010 North-West Frontier Province attacks
- 19 April 2010 Peshawar bombing

== See also ==
- Peshawar attack (disambiguation)
