= List of massacres in Pakistan =

A massacre is the deliberate slaughter of members of one group by one or more members of another more powerful group. A massacre may be indiscriminate or highly methodical in application. A massacre is a single event, though it may occur during the course of an extended military campaign or war. A massacre is separate from a battle (an event in which opposing sides fight), but may follow in its immediate aftermath, when one side has surrendered or lost the ability to fight, yet the victors persist in killing their opponents.

== Massacres ==
Name/Place	Date	Location	Deaths	Injuries	Notes	Ref
1947 Kamoke train massacre	24 September 1947	Kamoke, Punjab	408	587	Muslim attack against Hindus and Sikhs	
1948 Gujrat train massacre	12 January 1948	Gujrat railway station	1,300-1,600	150	By Muslim against Hindus and Sikhs	
Babrra massacre	12 August 1948	Babrra Ground,Charsaddah	150	400	C.M.Abdul Qayyum Khan Kashmiri, State police	
Qasba Aligarh massacre	14 December 1986	Orangi town	400+	-	By Tribal Pashtuns	
Pucca Qila Massacre	27 May 1990	Hyderabad, Sindh	70	-	By Sindh Police against protesting Muhajir women and children	
2003 Quetta Mosque Bombing	4 July 2003	Quetta, Balochistan	53	65+	By Lashkar e Jhangvi	
2008 Wah Bombings	21 August 2008	Wah Cantt, Punjab	70	80+	By Tehrik-i-Taliban Pakistan. Termed as the deadliest attack on a Military Installation in Pakistan's history at that time.	
2008 Marriot Bombings	20 September 2008	Islamabad	54	266		
2009 Pearl Continental bombing	9 June 2009	Peshawar	17	46	By Fedayeen al-Islam	
2010 Ahmadiyya mosques massacre	28 May 2010	Lahore	86	120+	By Tehrik-i-Taliban Pakistan	
June 2013 Pakistan bombings	30 June 2013	Quetta	52	119	One attack near a Muslim mosque in Hazara Town, Quetta in which at least 28 people killed. Another attack near the Badhaber Police Station in Peshawar in which 18 people killed. Other in a check post in Miranshah, North Waziristan in which four security officers were killed.	
2014 Peshawar school massacre	16 December 2014	Army Public School Peshawar	148	114	By Tehrik-i-Taliban Pakistan	
2015 Karachi bus shooting	May 13, 2015	Safoora Goth, Karachi	45+	-	By Jundallah	
2016 Punjab sweet poisoning	20 April to 8 May 2016	Layyah, Punjab	33	-	At least 33 people, including five children, died after eating a purposely poisoned laddu, a baked confection. A sweet shop owner, Khalid Mahmood, confessed to mixing the pesticide into the sweets after an argument with his brother and co-owner	
2017 Sargodha shrine massacre	April 1, 2017	Sargodha, Punjab	20	3	By Shrine custodian, Abdul Washed, and his associates	
2024 Kurram attack	21 Nov 2024	Kurram, KPK	54	86	By Islamic State (suspected). At least 86 were injured in the attack with 16 critically injured.	
2025 Darul Uloom Haqqania bombing	28 February 2025	Akora Khattak, KPK	7	20	By Islamic State – Khorasan Province (suspected)	

== See also ==
- List of terrorist incidents in Pakistan since 2001
- Terrorist incidents in Pakistan in 2016
- 2019 Ghotki riots
- 2014 Larkana temple attack
- 2009 Gojra riots
