= Peshawar school attack =

Peshawar school attack may refer to:

- 2014 Peshawar school massacre
- 2020 Peshawar school bombing

== See also ==
- Peshawar attack (disambiguation)
