= 2015 Karachi bus shooting =

Terrorist attack in Karachi, Pakistan

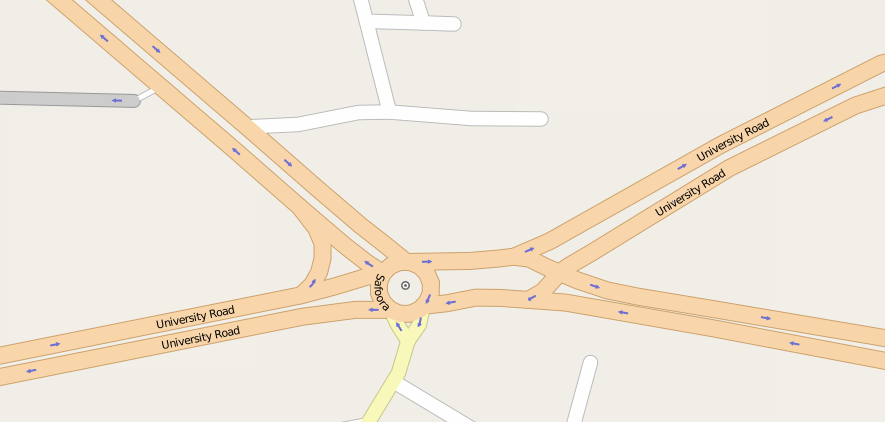
- Location: 24.8554°N 67.1719°E; Safoora Goth, Karachi, Sindh, Pakistan
- Date: 13 May 2015
- Target: Ismaili community
- Attack type: Shooting
- Deaths: 45
- Injuries: Dozens
- Perpetrators: Tehrik-i-Taliban Pakistan(claimed); Jundallah(claimed); ISIL(claimed)

On 13 May 2015, eight gunmen attacked a bus travelling in Safoora Goth, Karachi, Sindh in Pakistan. The shooting left at least 46 people dead. All of the victims were of the Ismaili Shia Muslim minority, suggesting the attack was a targeted killing of sectarian nature.

The banned militant group Jundallah claimed responsibility for the shooting. The gunmen hailed from Afghanistan. Pamphlets supporting ISIL, with whom Jundallah claims allegiance, were also found at the crime scene. However, the Pakistani government ruled out the connection of ISIL in the attack, stating that the group does not have a physical presence in the country. Numerous Pakistani government and media reports have also claimed the backing of a foreign hand, mainly India's Research and Analysis Wing (RAW), behind the attack. India has denied the allegations.

Five perpetrators behind the attack were later arrested by Pakistani security forces and were awarded death penalty by a Pakistani court on 12 May 2016. One of the mastermind behind the attack, Qari Saifullah Mehsud was later killed by two unknown gunmen in Khost province of Afghanistan. Locals in Afghanistan suspect that the 'two unknown gunmen' were associated with Pakistan as there has been attacks on anti-Pakistan terrorists groups residing in Afghanistan in the past.

== Background ==
Attacks on the Shia Muslim community have occurred frequently over the past two years in Pakistan, with many of the attacks claimed by outlawed extremist militant groups such as Tehrik-i-Taliban, Jundallah and Lashkar-e-Jhangvi, who view Shia Muslims as heretics. A number of analysts trace the origins of sectarian violence in the country back to the Soviet war in neighbouring Afghanistan, during which armed fundamentalist groups surfaced in the region.

== Shooting ==
The passengers were all residents of Al Azhar Gardens who regularly used the bus service for transport to work, school or other places. A total of six gunmen (including two disguised in police uniform) on three motorcycles stopped the bus shortly after its departure from the Safoora Chowrangi area of Karachi. The gunmen boarded the bus and opened fire, killing 45 passengers including 16 women. The majority of passengers belonged to the Nizari Ismaili community, a branch of Shia Muslims who follow the Aga Khan. Ismailis tend to be a peaceful, progressive and largely non-political community in Pakistan, with notable contributions to the country's education and health sectors. All the victims were shot in the head. Some passengers survived and were in critical condition when shifted to the hospital. According to some community members, the bus conductor, who was also hit in the head and injured, survived and drove the bus to the nearest Memon Hospital. However, others claimed he alerted another community member, who drove the bus.

== Perpetrators ==
=== Jundallah ===
Jundallah, a banned Sunni splinter militant group associated with the Tehrik-i-Taliban Pakistan, claimed responsibility for the shooting, and vowed to carry out more attacks on Shia Muslim minorities. Jundallah, which in 2014 vowed allegiance to the Islamic State of Iraq and the Levant, left pro-ISIL propaganda leaflets near the scene. The leaflets contained graphic language, describing the attacks as retaliation for "barbaric atrocities" in Iraq, Syria and Yemen, blaming Shi'ites, and declaring the attack as a response to extrajudicial operations by local law enforcement agencies. It was the first major attack in Pakistan in which pro-ISIS elements have been implicated. However, the Pakistani Foreign Office ruled out the involvement of ISIL, stating "The terror outfit has no footprints in Pakistan but our security forces are alert to meet any threat". The gunmen who carried out the shooting hailed from Afghanistan, and reportedly ran a small hotel business in Karachi.

=== Tehrik-i-Taliban Pakistan (TTP) ===
Tehrik-i-Taliban Pakistan (TTP) also claimed responsibility for the attack. Analysts state that the Pakistan's fragmented militant movements have previously competed to claim responsibility for attacks. The responsibility for the attack was claimed by the group's spokesman, Qari Saifullah Mehsud, and he was also believed to be one of the mastermind behind the attack. He fled to Afghanistan after the Pakistani military launched operations against the terrorists along the Afghanistan-Pakistan border. In 2016, he was arrested by U.S. forces in Afghanistan but was later released after he spent 14 weeks in jail in Afghanistan. Later he was shot dead by two unknown gunmen in Khost province of Afghanistan on 29 December 2019. According to the locals, the two gunmen had been "guests" at the TTP commander's home for several days before they killed him and fled. Qari Saifullah Mehsud was a key Tehrik-i-Taliban Pakistan (TTP) commander and was among the terrorists most wanted to Pakistan for his involvement in several terror attacks in the country. He was notorious for preparing suicide jackets and suicide bombers for terrorist acts across the country. According to the Analysts, the killing of Mehsud is a big hit for the TTP as he was trying to unite all the split militant groups. His death was also confirmed by TTP.

Mehsud funeral ceremony and burial took place in Gurbaz district of Khost Province. Locals in Afghanistan also believe that the 'two unknown gunmen' were related to Pakistan as there has been attacks on anti-Pakistan terrorists groups residing in Afghanistan in the past.

=== Allegations of RAW involvement ===
There have been allegations among Pakistani media and government sources of the involvement of Indian intelligence agency Research and Analysis Wing (RAW) in the attack. These allegations followed statements earlier in the month by the Pakistani military levelled against RAW for "whipping up terrorism in Pakistan." A day after the attack, Foreign Secretary Aizaz Ahmed Chaudhry stated that the Indian intelligence agency was creating unrest in Pakistan, adding that Pakistan would consider taking up the issue on international forums if RAW's involvement was found in the shooting. Chaudhry noted the recent arrest of two suspects in Karachi involved in terrorism who had received training from RAW, adding that Pakistan had taken up the issue of state terrorism with India "a number of times" through diplomatic channels.

RAW has been blamed by Pakistani authorities in the past, especially for its alleged involvement in the insurgency in Balochistan, via intelligence networks in neighbouring Afghanistan. A Pakistan Foreign Office spokesman added that Pakistan had asked Kabul not to allow RAW "to use the Afghan soil against us." According to Pakistan Today, initial investigations briefed to the Chief of Army Staff included the "strong possibility" of RAW involvement. Another Pakistani channel, Dunya reported intelligence agencies were working on evidence regarding RAW's involvement.

According to one official source, early investigations were pointing to the possible involvement of Baloch militants with RAW backing. The official disclosed that the federal government would organise a press conference to discuss evidence of RAW's involvement in terrorism. The conference will be chaired by the Prime Minister and will be attended by top civilian, military and intelligence leaders. During the conference, evidence linked to RAW's alleged involvement in terrorism in Karachi and Balochistan will be reviewed and the government will make a decision on countering RAW's activities, as well as raising the issue internationally. India's Home Minister Rajnath Singh dismissed the reports as "baseless allegations". During his visit to the Inter-Services Intelligence (ISI) headquarters in Rawalpindi, General Raheel Sharif met the ISI director-general Lt. Gen Rizwan Akhtar, during which both officials discussed RAW's involvement. According to an Inter-Services Public Relations statement, Sharif emphasised the need for "more proactive and coordinated role of intelligence agencies for an effective counterterrorism campaign and to counter hostile agencies' moves to destabilise Pakistan."

== Reaction ==
=== Domestic ===
Prime Minister Nawaz Sharif, Chief Minister of Sindh Qaim Ali Shah and leaders of major political parties strongly condemned the shooting. The Prime Minister declared the following day a national day of mourning during which the flag will fly at half-mast. Chief of Army Staff General Raheel Sharif cancelled his three-day visit to Sri Lanka and went to Karachi to assess the situation. General Sharif also telephoned Prince Aga Khan, leader of the Ismaili community, during which he expressed his condolences, stating: "Our heart goes out for the bereaved families. No efforts will be spared to apprehend and punish the perpetrators of this terrorist act and their abettors." The attack was also condemned by other notable public figures.

Aga Khan IV, the Spiritual Leader of the Ismaili Muslims, expressed his "shock and sadness" and said that it represented a "senseless act of violence against a peaceful community".

=== International ===
- European Union: Spokesperson in a press release condemned the shooting and expressed condolences to the families and friends of the victims.
- India: Prime Minister Narendra Modi condemned the shooting and expressed condolence saying "the attack in Karachi is deeply saddening and utterly condemnable. Our thoughts are with the families of the deceased. We stand firmly with the people of Pakistan in this hour of grief. I wish all those injured a quick recovery."
- Iran: Foreign Ministry Spokeswoman Marziyeh Afkham condemned the shooting saying "the objective of such terrorist attacks is to undermine unity in Pakistan." and expressed confidence that the people and government of Pakistan would safeguard stability and security in Pakistan.
- Turkey: Ministry of Foreign Affairs, in a press statement condemning the shooting, expressed condolences to the families and friends of the victims saying "We share the grief of the friendly and brotherly people of Pakistan and express once again our strong feelings of solidarity with the Government of Pakistan."
- United States: Embassy of the United States in Pakistan issued a press release to condemn the shooting. United States ambassador to Pakistan Richard Olson was quoted as saying "The United States remains steadfast in its commitment to the people of Pakistan in their efforts to counter terrorism. We support Pakistan's efforts to bring all those involved to justice and stand ready to provide any appropriate assistance to authorities investigating this tragic attack."

== See also ==
- List of terrorist incidents linked to Islamic State – Khorasan Province
- National Action Plan (Pakistan)
- Sectarianism in Pakistan
- Targeted killings in Pakistan
- Terrorist incidents in Pakistan in 2015
- Persecution of Shias by the Islamic State
- List of massacres in Pakistan
