= June 2013 Karachi bombing =

Terrorist incident in Pakistan

Karachi bomb attack
- Location: Karachi, Pakistan
- Date: June 26, 2013
- Target: Sindh High Court justice Maqbool Baqar's convoy
- Attack type: Bomb blast
- Deaths: 9
- Injuries: 15
- Perpetrator: Unknown

On 26 June 2013, a bomb exploded near Burns Road killing nine people and injuring fifteen in Karachi, Pakistan. The bomb was intended to blow up Sindh High Court justice Maqbool Baqar's convoy. The bomb was located on a motorbike near a mosque. Five of the people killed in the bomb explosion were police officers. On 17 July 2013, DIG South Dr Ameer Sheikh claimed that police arrested Bashir Leghari, suspected of being the mastermind of the attack on the judge's convoy, along with two of his accomplices in an operation carried out in Karachi's Surjani Town.

== See also ==
- March 2013 Karachi bombing
- Terrorist incidents in Pakistan in 2013
