= Thomas Hughes (priest, born 1838) =

British missionary (1838–1911)

Thomas Patrick Hughes (26 March 1838 – 8 August 1911) was a British Anglican missionary who served under the auspices of the Church Mission Society (CMS) in Peshawar in British India (now Pakistan) for 20 years. He was noted for his facility with languages, Islamic scholarship and contribution to the completion of All Saints Memorial Church in Peshawar.

== Early years and education ==
He was born in the hamlet of Henley, near Ludlow, Shropshire, England, son of a miller, Thomas Hughes. The Hughes family consisting of two children and their parents lived with Thomas Hughes Sr.'s mother in a house in Ludlow. Thomas Hughes Sr. died when Thomas Patrick Hughes was ten years old.

Hughes' family was not wealthy, yet his godfather, Thomas Massey, was willing and able to pay for his way through Ludlow Grammar School. In subsequent years Hughes went to work at Messrs S. and J. Watts Co. in Manchester as a salesperson. While in Manchester, he was involved with the Sunday School as a teacher and Superintendent at St. Ann's Church. During this time he applied to the CMS for the position of deacon and missionary. He was accepted into the Church Missionary Society College, Islington and in 1862 commenced his studies there. In 1864 his studies at Islington were complete and he was ordained deacon on 24 July in the Islington College Chapel.

Although this was the extent of his formal education he was awarded a number of honorary titles later in his career on the merit of his astounding literary accomplishments. Bachelor of Divinity and Doctor of Divinity were bestowed upon him by the Archbishop of Canterbury in 1876 and 1886, respectively. He also received from St. John's College in Annapolis, Maryland the LLD in 1897.

== Family ==
At the age of 26, Hughes married Eliza Lloyd on 17 August 1864 at Manchester Cathedral; Canon Bardsley of St. Ann's Church officiated. Their marriage was held less than a month after his ordination as a deacon with the CMS. Together the couple left for the mission field on 12 September 1864. While on the mission field, they had eight children, six of whom survived infancy. The two that died early on, Minnie and Alice, were first born of the eight and did not make it past the age of three. Infant mortality was not uncommon in Peshawar for there were consistently recurring bouts of cholera and other illnesses. The surviving children lived for a few years with their parents at Peshawar before being sent to England at age three, in part to avoid losing them also to illness. Hughes was often separated from his family, as they were in England for a good part of their lives, but also because of the nature of his work – since he frequently was in his office, visiting in the Hujra, or on preaching journeys throughout the countryside surrounding Peshawar.

== Missionary work ==
Hughes and his wife originally set out for China; however they never made it there and were instead posted in a city on the Indian frontier, Peshawar, where they remained for twenty years.

=== Itinerant Preaching ===
Although posted in the city, Hughes had a passion for those in the rural areas around Peshawar. He would go to the villages, sending a delegation ahead of him to let the leaders know he was coming, and meet with the Imam(s) and the people to talk about the Christian and Islamic faiths.

=== Hujra ===
Hughes recognised that traditional hospitality was very important to the Afghans. In lieu of this he had a hujra built at the mission compound in Peshawar. A Hujra is a guest house common in larger houses in Northern India and Pakistan typically where male guests are entertained and community meetings are held. The hujra furnished for guests by Hughes played a key role in his ministry, as many came as guests and talked with him openly in this familiar context. After Hughes left Peshawar, his co-worker, Rev. Worthington Jukes, made an addition to the Hujra at Peshawar to accommodate more guests.

=== All Saints' Memorial Church ===
A great feat accomplished in part by Hughes, was the completion of All Saints' Memorial Church in Peshawar. It was erected for the use of the native Christians in memory of those who gave their lives for the spread of the Christian gospel in the Peshawar vicinity. He was a leading visionary on the construction of the church, and also played a vital role in the fundraising of the means to build it. Among many other features, there are inscribed the names of those who died during the work at Peshawar. Included among these names are those of Hughes' infant daughters who died.

Hughes believed that the most effective way to minister to the people around him was to adapt to their culture. So he set aside his British attire and adopted the dress of the Afghans. He also mastered their language to be able to converse with ease. Additionally, he employed an Afghan man, familiar with the customs of his people, to host in the hujra. His method of acculturation also carried over to All Saints' Church. Since the church was to be for the native people, he made it in their style. The edifice is similar to a mosque in that there are domes and minarets rather than steeples. The interior utilised local materials, designs and special handiwork, in accordance with Hughes' philosophy and practice.

== After Peshawar ==
In 1884 after 20 years of service in Peshawar, Hughes returned to England in an attempt to find a new ministry position and be reunited with his four children not resident in Peshawar. When he was unable to find a suitable parish in England he made the decision to emigrate to the United States. He departed on 21 May 1884, and his wife and 5 oldest children joined him in 1888. Their youngest son, Sidney, remained in England to finish his schooling.

In the United States he worked in churches at Lebanon Springs, New York and between 1889 and 1902 at the Church of the Resurrection (at that time called the Church of the Holy Sepulchre) located at East 74th Street in Manhattan. Although the case was withdrawn by the alleged victim's lawyer as a probable blackmail attempt and dismissed by the assigned magistrate prior to trial, Hughes was the subject of a legal summons in June 1896 accused of assaulting a minor in his study at the church.

Retiring from the ministry in 1902, he continued his prolific writing until his death. Thomas Patrick Hughes died aged 73 on 8 August 1911 at his home in Kings Park, Long Island.

== Literary accomplishments ==
Hughes wrote extensively during his lifetime. His most notable works include:

- A Dictionary of Islam: Being a Cyclopaedia of the Doctrines, Rites, Ceremonies, and Customs, Together with the Technical and Theological Terms, of the Muhammadan Religion. W. H. Allen. 1885. and
- the official government textbook for learning Pashto.

The Project Canterbury website has a chronological list of all Hughes' known writings.

== See also ==
- William Muir
- Francis Joseph Steingass
- Stanley Lane-Poole
- Ibn Khallikan
