= Terrorist incidents in Pakistan in 2013 =

This is a list of terrorist incidents in Pakistan in 2013. Some of the incidents are sectarian in nature and the TTP is responsible for a majority of them.

== January ==
- January 1 – Malik Mukhtar Hussain, was a prominent licensed organizer of Shia processions and majalis in Chiniot. He was gunned down in an Imambargah on 31 December 2012 by six armed men. After few days, an injured 16 years old Moazam Ali martyred. He was admitted at local hospital.
- January 1 – A bomb mounted to a motorcycle exploded near Ayesha Manzil in Karachi after the address of MQM by Dr. Tahir-ul-Qadri, killing four people and injured more than 45.
- January 4 – Haider and Jamal, twin brothers, were going to the university on January 2, 2013, when unknown gunmen attacked them. Haider Lateef Qadri, who along with his twin brother Jamal Jafar Qadri, had suffered gunshot wounds died at a private hospital on Friday. His brother (jamal) had expired on the spot. The 20-year-old BCom student and his brother were attacked by two motorcyclists at the intersection of Mirza Adam Khan Road in Agra Taj Colony. Haider had been under treatment for three days. The motive behind the attack remains unclear.
- January 9 – A private school owner was shot dead in North Karachi in what police described as a ‘sectarian’ attack on Wednesday morning. Engineer Syed Ali Hyder Jafri, a 48-year-old shia muslim, was shot dead in Sector 11-A, North Karachi, after he dropped his wife to a campus of their school, said an official at the Sir Syed police station. "It was surly a sectarian killing considering the ongoing spate of the killings in the city," the SP said. Another incident took place in Peshawar when Pakistan Peoples Party (PPP) president for Kurram Agency Dr. Riaz Hussain was gunned down in Dabgari Garden near his clinic. He belonged to an influential Sadat family of Parachinar and had much influence over Shia Muslims in the province. Zawar Shah, a Hazara Shia Muslim, was targeted outside his shop on Seerat Chowk, Khuzdar, Balochistan. He is a resident of Quetta and, according to reports, that's where his body is being taken.
- January 10 – Four bombings in Quetta and the Swat Valley killed over a hundred people and injured an estimated 270. Many of the casualties were caused by the second blast as police and media rushed to the scene. The bombed area is predominantly Shia Muslim. The banned Sunni group Lashkar-e-Jhangvi (LeJ) claimed responsibility for the attack in a predominantly Shi'ite neighborhood where the residents are ethnic Hazara.
- January 23 – Five people were killed and 3 injured in a blast in Orakzai Agency.
- January 24 – At least six people including three policemen were killed and seven injured after twin blasts in Karachi.
- January 30 – At least 3 people were killed and 4 injured in a blast outside a commercial plaza in Karachi at night.
- January 31 – Two polio vaccination doctors died in a roadside bomb blast in Waziristan on their way to Khurram.

== February ==
- February 1 – A suicide blast killed 22 people and wounded 40 in a market targeting Shias outside a mosque in Hangu. The death toll was reported variously above 20 and up to 24.
- February 7 – A policeman was killed and five other were wounded in a bomb attack targeting a police van in Karachi's Orangi Town.
- February 8 – A bomb exploded near a marketplace in Kalaya, Orakzai, killing 16 people, and Baloch militants fired rocket-propelled grenades, killing one soldier and sounding five others in Turbat district, Balochistan.
- February 11 – At least six persons including an Assistant Sub Inspector were killed on Monday in various target killings in Karachi.
- February 14 – Seven people died in a blast at a police checkpoint in Hangu. Later the toll rose to 11. Then seven militia men were killed in a bomb attack on an anti-Taliban tribe. Two passenger vehicles were struck by landmines killing 9 people near Hassan Khel, Orakzai region. At least six suicide bombers were killed while attacking a police station outside Bannu.
- February 16 – Pakistani police have said 83 people killed on Saturday, saying a suicide bomber was behind the attack that pulverized a busy marketplace in Quetta. The death toll rose to 91 after two days.
- February 17 – Eight people were killed in target killings in Karachi on Sunday, Dawn reported the next day.
- February 18 – gunmen in police uniforms attacked the compound of a senior government official killing four security guards were killed in Peshawar. Two explosions occurred. Eight more people died in targeted killings in Karachi. Two blasts in Karachi injured at least two people. In a separate incident, prominent Professor of Vitreoretinal Surgery, Dr. Syed Ali Haider and his 11-year-old son, Murtaza, were shot dead, while on the way to Murtaza's school. It is suspected that the attacks were carried out by the banned Sunni extremist group, Lashkar-e-Jhangvi (LeJ).
- February 26 – A police official says a blast at a Sufi shrine in southern Pakistan has killed two people.

== March ==
- March 3 – A powerful explosion ripped through a crowd of Shiites as they left a mosque in Karachi, Pakistan's largest city, on Sunday, killing at least 45 people.
- March 9 – A blast happened in the Jamia Chishtia mosque during Zuhr prayer in Peshawar, killed four at board and at least twenty seven injuries. Bomb was detonated in the walls of mosque.
- March 11 – A suicide bomber blew himself up near a police van in northwestern Pakistan on Tuesday, killing at least two people and wounding 10, police said.
- March 15 – Pakistan officials say a bomb blast in the country's largest city Karachi has killed three people and wounded five others.
- March 18 – A suicide bomber blew himself up in a courtroom in the north-westPakistani city of Peshawar, killing four people and wounding 47 others, officials said.
- March 21 – A car bomb exploded amid scores of people lining up at a food distribution center in northwest Pakistan on Thursday, killing at least 17 people and injuring 28 others in what appeared to be a rare attack on Pakistanis displaced by the country's war against insurgents
- March 22 – A bomb planted on a motorbike killed six people and wounded another 15 on Friday in a crowded Pakistani market in troubled southwestern province Baluchistan, police said.
- March 24 – At least 17 Pakistani soldiers were killed when a suicide bomber rammed an explosives-laden water tanker into a check post in the restive North Waziristan tribal region of the country.
- March 29 – Twelve people were killed and 28 others sustained injuries when a suicide bomber attacked the convoy of the commandant of Frontier Constabulary (FC) near an army checkpost on the Fakhr-e-Alam Road in Peshawar Cantonment here on Friday.
- March 30 – A suicide bomber on Saturday struck a police patrol in a town of Peshawar in northwestern Pakistan, killing a policeman and wounding six others, police said.
- March 31 – The principal of a private secondary school in Ittehad Town was killed and several children, including his daughter, were injured after an attack and shooting at the school on Saturday morning in Karachi.
- March 31 – Two persons were killed and six others, including a former provincial legislator, injured in a bomb blast in Pakistan's restive northwest on Sunday, police said.

== April ==
- April 2 – At least 7 people have been killed in an attack by dozens of militants on an electricity plant in the Pakistani city of Peshawar, officials say.
- April 4 – Suspected militants threw a grenade at a vehicle carrying paramilitary security officers in Karachi (southern Pakistan) on Wednesday, killing 3 and wounding 3 others.
- April 10 – Gunmen shot to death a policeman protecting a team of female polio workers in northwestern Pakistan on Wednesday, the latest in a series of attacks on people working on the U.N.-backed vaccination campaign, police said.
- April 11 – Fakhrul Islam, A Muttahida Qaumi Movement leader, who was a candidate for Pakistan's upcoming polls, was shot dead by unidentified gunmen in southern Sindh province on Thursday, police said.
- April 13 – A bomb planted in a bus killed at least 8 passengers and wounded 7 others in northwestern Pakistan on Saturday, police said.
- April 14 – A Pakistani police officer says a bomb blast has killed a local leader in an anti-Taliban political party ANP in the northwestern Swat valley.
- April 16 – QUETTA: At least 4 people were killed, including the son of the provincial chief of the Pakistan Muslim League – Nawaz (PML-N) Sanaullah Zehri, when a blast targeted his convoy in restive Balochistan's Khuzdar district.
- April 16 – At least 17 people including policemen and minors were killed and near 60 more wounded in a suicide bomb blast that tore through an Awami National Party (ANP) corner meeting in Peshawar on Tuesday evening.
- April 21 – A woman suicide bomber today detonated a bomb outside a hospital in a lawless tribal area of northwest Pakistan, killing at least 4 people and injuring five others.
- April 24 – Eight bomb explosions in 24 hours in Pakistan's three provincial capitals left 11 people dead and around 60 injured, heightening security fears ahead of the May 11 general election in the country, according to police and media reports.
- April 25 – A bomb exploded outside an election office of MQM, one of Pakistan's main political parties Thursday evening, killing five people and wounding 9 in the latest attack ahead of the nation's May 11 elections in Karachi.
- April 27 – A bomb exploded on Friday near the office of a main Pakistan political party that had received threats from the Taliban, killing nine people in the latest attack in the run-up to next month's parliamentary election.
- April 28 – Bomb blasts targeting the election offices of two candidates in northwest Pakistan killed at least 11 people and injured 30 Sunday, the latest in a string of terror attacks that have cast a shadow over parliamentary elections slated for mid-May.
- April 29 – Pakistani authorities say a suicide bomber targeting policemen has killed 8 people in the main northwestern city of Peshawar.

== May ==
- May 4 – Three people have been killed by two blasts near the offices of a political party (MQM) in the Pakistani city of Karachi.
- May 6 – A suicide bomber targeted an election rally organized by a religious party Jamiat Ulema-e- Islam in Pakistan on Monday, killing 25 people & wounding 65, officials said.
- May 7 – A suicide bomber killed at least nine people and wounded a candidate campaigning in northwest Pakistan town of Hangu on Tuesday.
- May 8 – Officials in northwestern Pakistan say a suicide car bomber has killed two people and wounded at least 23.
- May 11 – Bomb attacks kill 29 on Pakistan Election.
- May 12 – At least six people were killed and 45 got injured in a suicide car attack on Balochistan province 's police chief house in Pakistan's southwest city of Quetta on Sunday night.
- May 17 – Blasts targeting two mosques in northwestern Pakistan on Friday have left 15 people dead and others injured, a police official said.

== June ==
- June 15 – Quaid-e-Azam Residency attacked and series of bombing in Quetta.
- June 18 – a suicide bomber detonated his vest at a funeral in Shergarh, Mardan in northwest Pakistan, killing at least 34 people and injuring over 60 people. The attack took place at a funeral prayer service for Abdullah Khan, who owned a compressed natural gas station. One of the people killed in the attack was Imran Khan Mohmand, who was previously an independent MPA.
- June 20 – a suicide bomber blew himself up at a Shiite mosque, killing 15 people and injuring over 20. The attack happened in the Shiite area known as Gulshan Colony. The attacker is believed to have been a Sunni Muslim. Three people were suspected of carrying out the attacks. The perpetrators first gunned down a police officer and a security guard, before the suicide bomber went into the mosque. There were reportedly around 300 people worshiping inside the mosque. The president of Pakistan, Asif Ali Zardari, commented about the attack saying, "Such cowardly and heinous acts by the militants cannot weaken the nation's resolve to pursue its struggle against militancy."
- June 23 – an attack on Foreign tourists in Nanga Parbat in which 10 foreign tourists were killed.
- June 26 – Bomb attacks in Pakistan killed 10 people and wounded nine others on Wednesday, including a senior judge who was critically injured following a blast in the business capital Karachi, officials said.
- June 30 – At least 52 people have been killed in Pakistan, on the same day Prime Minister Nawaz Sharif and British counterpart David Cameron met to discuss security.

== July ==
- July 6 – A time-device bomb blast occurred in the food street of the Old Anarkali district, in the eastern city of Lahore, Pakistan. The blast killed five people and injured dozens of others. The blast was triggered by a time-device bomb. The blast occurred on the night of Saturday on 6 July 2013. Two people died on the spot while three succumbed to their injuries at Mayo Hospital on Sunday, bringing the death toll to five. The deaths were confirmed by police and Rescue 1122 officials. Mirza Taimoor, a student of GC university Lahore was also injured severely in this incident.
- July 7 – A blast in a food street in the Anarkali area of Lahore killed three people and injured dozens of others.
- July 8 – At least nine people, including two bomb disposal officers were killed in two separate blasts in Khyber Pakhtunkhwa province.
- July 10 – President Asif Ali Zardari's chief security officer and two others was killed in a bomb attack in Karachi.
- July 11 – A Bomb explodes near minority Shiite mosque in northwest Pakistan killed two people and injured six others.
- July 15 – Motorcycle-riding gunmen killed seven people in the restive Pakistani city of Quetta on Monday, with four members of the country's Hazara religious minority among the victims, police said.
- July 20 – Blasts in Karachi kill four people.
- July 27 – A twin suicide bomb blast in Parachinar market killed 60 people and 200.
- July 29 – Militants attacked on Central Jail in Dera Ismail Khan and freed more than 300 prisoners. TTP claimed responsibility of attack.

== August ==
- August 7 Eleven teenagers were killed and twenty-six others were injured while playing football at a market in Karachi. The bombing took place in the Lyari District of Karachi. The bomb was targeted at provincial leader Javed Nagori, who was attending the match handing out prizes.
- August 8 – A suicide bomber exploded at a funeral being held for a police officer. The bomb exploded in Quetta, Pakistan, and killed as many as thirty-one people and injured over fifty people.
- August 9 – Four gunmen opened fire at a mosque in Quetta while people were exiting the mosque. As a result, at least ten people were killed and thirty more people were injured. It is suspected that the target in the shooting was former Pakistan Peoples Party minister Ali Madad Jatak. This shooting occurred during the time when many Pakistani citizens were celebrating Eid al-Fitr.

== September ==
- September 6 – 7 shia people killed with firing in jassoki Punjab.
- September 15 – Major General Sanaullah Niazi, in charge of military operations in Swat, was killed along with two subordinates in a bomb attack in Upper Dir district near the Afghan border.
- September 22 – A twin suicide bomb blast in Peshawar church killed 78 people and 130.
- September 27 – A bomb blast on a bus in Peshawar killed at least 19 people.
- September 29 – A car bomb in the Qissa Khawani Bazaar of Peshawar killed at least 41 people.

== October ==
- October 10 – A blast occurred outside a restaurant in the busy Anarkali district of Lahore, killing one person and injuring 16 others. This was the second blast in Lahore this year, the earlier one also occurring in the Anarkali area on 7 July.
- October 10 – A bomb explosion outside a city police station in Quetta killed 5 people and injured 37 others.
- October 16 – Israr Ullah Khan Gandapur provincial Law minister of Khyber Pakhtunkhwa was killed in a suicide bombing at his residence.

== November ==
- November 15 – The clashes erupted in Rawalpindi, when an Ashura procession in the main downtown area coincided with a sermon in a nearby mosque at least 8 dead and 44 injured.

== December ==
- December 17 – Suicide Blast outside an Imambargah situated in the Gracey Lines area Rawalpidni killed three people, including two policemen and left 14 injured.
