= 7 May 2013 Syed Janan election rally bombing =

Terrorist incident in Pakistan

- Location: Doaba town, Hangu District, Pakistan
- Date: 7 May 2013; 12:51 – (UTC+05:00)
- Target: Mufti Syed Janan
- Attack type: Suicide attack
- Deaths: 18–25
- Injuries: Over 40

The 7 May 2013 bombing at an election rally is the deadliest of a series of attacks that hit the town of Doaba in the district of Hangu which has a history of sectarian violence. The region had become a flash-point for violence between Sunni and Shiite Muslims as Pakistan prepared to hold a general election and provincial elections on 11 May, 2013.

A suicide bomber attacked a rally for Syed Janan, a candidate of the Jamiat Ulema-e-Islam party. Mufti Syed Janan was reportedly the main target but he left the scene with minor injuries. At least 18 people were killed and 40 people including 11 children were injured in the attack of 7 May 2013, which raised the total number of fatalities, in pre-election violence since April, to over 100. According to the police officer Haleem Khan the suicide bomber was on a motorcycle and detonated near the vehicle carrying election candidate Syed Janan.

Janan later told the press, "I was on my election campaign and coming to my vehicle when the bomber blew himself up. I received some injuries but survived. Two of my guards were seriously wounded."

It was one of the attacks that targeted candidates from Islamist parties, indicating a new trend in the pre-election violence, which had only occurred with secular parties before this week. A curfew was imposed after these attacks. Investigations are going on and the site is cordoned off.

== See also ==
- Tehrik-i-Taliban Pakistan
- War in North-West Pakistan
