= 2017 Sargodha shrine massacre =

Terrorist incident in Pakistan

- 2017 Sargodha shrine massacre (Punjab, Pakistan) 2017 Sargodha shrine massacre (Pakistan)
- Location: 31.683953°N 72.267105°E; 95 Shomaali, Sargodha, Punjab, Pakistan
- Date: April 1, 2017
- Target: People visiting shrine
- Attack type: Club beating, Torture, Drugging
- Weapons: Club, Machete, Baton
- Deaths: 20
- Injuries: 3
- Victim: People at the spot
- Assailants: Shrine custodian, Abdul Washed and his associates
- No. of participants: 5
- Defender: Punjab Police

On 1 April 2017, Abdul Waheed, the custodian of Pir Mohammad Ali Gujjar shrine, along with his associates tortured 20 people to death inside the shrine in Sargodha, Pakistan. Waheed was arrested by police and later admitted to committing the crime. The Chief Minister of Punjab, Shehbaz Sharif announced Rs. 5 lakh (US$1,800) for families of deceased victims and Rs. 2 lakh (US$720) for each of the injured.

== Attack ==
The caretaker of the shrine, Abdul Waheed invited people to visit the shrine and sedated them through food on late Saturday night. Some sources also claimed that the food was poisoned. After sedation, Waheed started beating people along with his associates and tortured people with a club, a knife and other weapons. The assault was carried out in the courtyard of the shrine. Some bodies of victims were nude. During the assault, 20 people were killed, among whom were six belonging to a single family, while three were injured. Out of the three injured, one informed police.

== Investigation ==
After being informed, the local police arrived and arrested Waheed and four of his accomplices. During investigation, Waheed admitted to committing the crime. Local rescue official Mazhar Shah said that Waheed used to meet his devotees twice a month and used to torture them.
