= May 2023 Peshawar bombing =

2023 Peshawar blast
- Location: Peshawar, Khyber Pakhtunkhwa, Pakistan
- Date: 18 May 2023; Approximately 7:31 PM (UTC+5)
- Attack type: Bombing
- Weapon: 200g of explosives
- Deaths: 1
- Injuries: 3
- Perpetrator: Unknown
- Motive: Under investigation

On 18 May 2023, a blast took place next to the Ring Road in Peshawar, the capital of Khyber Pakhtunkhwa, Pakistan. One person died in the explosion, while three others were hurt. The neighborhood police started an inquiry into the situation.

== Background ==
Following the expiration of the truce between the government and the Tehreek-i-Taliban Pakistan (TTP) in November of the previous year, there was a spike in violence. With over 130 people killed and 254 injured in at least 44 militant incidents nationwide in January 2023, which was the worst month since 2018, the attacks reached their pinnacle. The Pakistani military began a fresh offensive against militants in reaction to the rising violence.

== The Blast ==
On May 18, 2023, around 7:31 pm, a blast happened in Peshawar close to the Ring Road. Three people were hurt in the explosion, which was caused by a bomb placed inside a motorbike, and one person died. The Hayatabad Medical Complex received the injured patients. Police, medics, and a bomb disposal team responded to the event and arrived on the scene to seal the area and gather evidence.

According to the inquiry, the blast employed about 200 grams of explosives. The precise nature of the explosion and its causes, however, were yet unknown.
