= 2010 Kurram agency mass kidnapping =

- Location: Kurram, Pakistan
- Date: 15 May 2010; Unknown time
- Attack type: Kidnapping
- Weapon: Heavily armed
- Victims: 61 civilians (suspected)
- Perpetrator: Militants posing as policemen

The 2010 Kurram agency mass kidnapping happened on May 15, 2010, in Kurram Agency in Federally Administered Tribal Areas of Pakistan. 60 people including women and children were kidnapped by militants dressed in police uniforms.

== Background ==
Kurram has been a Taliban stronghold for many years. It has also been the site of sectarian violence between Shias and Sunnis. A large number of militants are thought to have fled to Kurram agency from South Waziristan last year after the military launched an operation there. Security forces had recently launched intense air strikes on militants in Kurram and adjoining areas.

== Kidnappings ==
The kidnappers were dressed in police uniforms. Four people were initially abducted from a vehicle belonging to a government power utility. The vehicle was then set on fire. Later 57 more civilians were taken from a convoy going to Parachinar. 50 hostages were released on 16 May 2010. Negotiations for release of remaining hostages were ongoing.

== Responsibility ==
No group has yet claimed responsibility. Government sources have stated that an investigation is under way and efforts are being made to recover the kidnapped people. The government blamed the Taliban for the kidnapping.

== See also ==
- List of kidnappings
- List of solved missing person cases (post-2000)
- Terrorism in Pakistan
- War in North-West Pakistan
