= 2014 Peshawar cinema bombings =

Terrorist incident in Peshawar, Pakistan

- Part of War in North-West Pakistan
- Location of Khyber Pakhtunkhwa in Pakistan
- Location: Peshawar District, Peshawar, Pakistan
- Date: 2–11 February 2014
- Target: Movie theatre
- Weapon: Grenade
- Deaths: 13
- Injuries: 19

The 2014 Peshawar cinema bombings refers to a series of back-to-back bombings that took place in Shama Cinema and Picturehouse Cinemas between 2 and 11 February where 20 people were killed and 54 others were injured.

== 2 February bombings ==
During the February second bombings there was from 90 to 100 people inside the Picture House movie theatre who were watching Ziddi Pakhtun at Qissa Khawani Bazaar. The attackers threw two grenades after the movie was paused while still sitting in the back of the cinema. The grenades killed five which was followed by a stampede during which 31 were injured. The wounded were transported to Lady Reading Hospital where two of them died.

== 11 February bombings ==
The 11 February explosion happened during the Pashto language film called Yarana at Shama Cinema. According to Ejaz Ahmed, the Capital City Police Officer, the cinema contained 80 people (50 under other sources) and that three grenades were used by the attackers. After the blasts there was blood on caps and shoes as well as human remains scattered around. It was followed by a stampede soon after, which caused majority of injuries. The injured were taken to the Lady Reading Hospital.

== Claimants and reasoning ==
No group have claimed responsibility but the cinema received warnings prior to the attacks. It was believed that the attack happened because the theatre used to show pornographic films.

== Reactions ==
The blasts were later condemned by Pakistan Tehreek-e-Insaf chairman Imran Khan and mentioned that it will hinder peace talks as well. Some hours later, the attack was also condemned by the Pakistani President Mamnoon Hussain, as well as Prime Minister Nawaz Sharif and Muttahida Qaumi Movement leader Altaf Hussain.

== Suspects ==
It was suspected that Taliban was behind the second attack.
