= All Saints Church, Peshawar =

Church in Peshawar, Pakistan

All Saints' Church, Peshawar
- All Saints' Church, Peshawar
- 34°00′19″N 71°34′16″E
- Location: Kohati Gate, Walled City, Peshawar, Khyber Pakhtunkhwa, Pakistan
- Country: Pakistan
- Denomination: Church of Pakistan
- Churchmanship: Anglican

History
- Status: Parish church

Architecture
- Functional status: Active
- Architect: Local architect under Church Missionary Society supervision
- Architectural type: Cruciform plan
- Style: Indo-Saracenic Revival

Administration
- Province: Church of Pakistan
- Diocese: Diocese of Peshawar
- Parish: All Saints’ Parish, Peshawar

All Saints' Church is a historic Anglican place of worship located within the Kohati Gate of the old walled city of Peshawar. Constructed in 1883, the church is architecturally known for its synthesis of Christian liturgical requirements with Islamic Saracenic aesthetics, which resulted in a structure that bears resemblance to a mosque, complete with minarets and a central dome.

== History ==
Prior to the construction of the church, the local congregation worshipped at the nearby Edwardes Mission School and a small reading hall known as the Anjuman or Mission Chapel in Peepal Mandi. The impetus for a dedicated church building came from the Reverend T.P. Hughes, a missionary serving in Peshawar from 1865 to 1884. Hughes advocated for a building that possessed a "fitting external embodiment" similar to a mosque to better integrate with the local culture.

Fundraising efforts included a bazaar held in Simla in July 1882 at the instigation of Lady Beatrice Lyell Aitchison, Charles Umpherston Aitchison, the Lieutenant Governor of the Punjab from 1882 to 1887. The construction was overseen by Reverend Worthington Jukes, a founding member, with technical assistance from General Follard of the Royal Engineers. The Church was opened on St. John's Day, 27 December 1883. The foundation stone of the church was laid by Captain Graves whose widow presented the brass desk on the Lord's Table. A local architect, under the supervision of Church Missionary Society staff including the Rev. Thomas Hughes, was responsible for the design of the building. The building is cruciform in layout with the chancel at the west end.

=== 2013 attack ===
On September 22, 2013, two suicide bombers carried out an attack outside the church at the end of a Sunday service, killing 127 people and injuring 170. 600 parishioners were on the front lawn of the church, having lunch, when two bombers detonated themselves, leaving the church scattered with body parts. Victims included an estimated 37 children. TTP Jundullah, linked to the Taliban, said it had carried out the attack on the Christian congregation, saying, "We will continue our attacks on non-Muslims on Pakistani land."

This was the second attack on churches in the province of Khyber Pakhtunkhwa in a year, where another church in Mardan was burnt exactly a year before this incident.

On January 30, 2022, two clergymen from the church were shot dead by attackers approaching on a motorcycle as they went from the church to the clergy house attached to the church. Pastor William Siraj was killed instantly and Revd. Patrick Naeem was injured and died later of his wounds. On the occasion of the killings Azad Marshall, senior Bishop of the Church of Pakistan condemned the attack and said "We demand justice and the protection of Christians by the government of Pakistan."

== Architecture ==
The church is noted for its symmetry, featuring columns, oriental arches, and minarets flanking the facade and transepts. It is aligned to face Jerusalem rather than the traditional eastern orientation of European churches. The frontal facade features calligraphy in Persian, while the interior walls display texts in languages historically spoken in the city, including the English, Hebrew, Pashto, Urdu, Arabic, and Persian.

The interior retains its 19th-century arrangement, with a capacity for approximately 200 worshippers. Another feature of the sanctuary is the altar screen, which showcases intricate wood carving known as pinjra-work, a craft for which Peshawar was historically famous. The brass lectern was presented as a memorial to Robert Milman, the Bishop of Calcutta.

== Memorials ==
A curved passageway leads to an ambulatory behind the altar, which houses numerous white marble memorial plaques documenting the history of the mission. Notable figures commemorated include:

- Dilawar Khan: A notorious outlaw who converted to Christianity, joined the elite Corps of Guides, and died in service in 1869.
- Miss Annie Norman: The daughter of Sir Henry Norman, who died at age 27 after a year of missionary work. She is the only European buried in the native Wazirbagh Christian cemetery.
- Reverend Isidor Lowenthal: A Polish Jewish convert who believed Pashtuns were a lost tribe of Israel and dedicated his life to serving them.
- Vernon and Lilian Starr: Vernon was a martyred missionary, while his wife Lilian is celebrated for venturing into the Tribal Areas to rescue Molly Ellis, an Englishwoman kidnapped in 1923.

The church also houses a Bible in Hebrew and English dated 1806. Its brass latch is engraved with "Peshawar City, Afghanistan," a relic referencing the era when Peshawar served as the winter capital of the Afghan Durrani Empire.

== Local legend ==
A persistent local narrative, though absent from official church records and missionary memoirs, recounts the death of 13 Christian workers who were allegedly killed by locals while attempting to fix the cross atop the dome during construction. While likely apocryphal, workers at the site often point to marks near the cross as bullet holes to substantiate the oral tradition.
