= 1994 Peshawar school bus hijacking =

On 20 February 1994, three armed militants from Afghanistan took control of a school bus near the city of Peshawar in the North-West Frontier Province of Pakistan, close to the Afghan border. Seven teachers and about seventy children in the bus were taken hostage. The bus was driven to the Embassy of Afghanistan in Islamabad, where fifty-seven or sixty-one of the hostages were released. The hijackers made demands for food relief to be sent to Kabul, for a ransom, and for safe conduct and a helicopter to take them to Afghanistan.

On the following day, 21 February 1994, units of the Pakistani Special Services Group attacked the Afghan embassy, killed the three hostage-takers and rescued the remaining six or sixteen hostages, who were unharmed.

== See also ==
- 2010 Kurram agency mass kidnapping
- 2014 Peshawar school massacre
- List of kidnappings
- Lists of solved missing person cases
