= March 2011 Peshawar bombing =

Terrorist attack in Peshawar, Pakistan

Coordinates: 34.0000°N 71.5000°E

- Location: Peshawar, Khyber Pakhtunkhwa, Pakistan
- Date: 9 March 2011
- Attack type: Car bombing
- Deaths: 73
- Injuries: 45
- Perpetrator: Taliban
- Motive: Islamic terrorism

The 9 March 2011 Peshawar bombing occurred in the city of Peshawar, the capital of the Khyber Pakhtunkhwa province in north-west Pakistan. The attack took place in the Adezai locality of Peshawar; 37 people were killed and at least 45 were wounded. The blast happened during a funeral held for the wife of a local anti-Taliban Pashtun militia leader. According to a witness, the attack was carried out by a suicide bomber, a "boy wrapped in a shawl". A medical emergency was declared at hospitals in Peshawar, where those injured in the attack were taken.

The Taliban later claimed responsibility for the explosion, and said it was retaliation for the local militia's support for Pakistani security forces in carrying out anti-Taliban operations.

Prime Minister Yousaf Raza Gilani issued a statement condemning the attacks, though the government was also criticised for its lack of support for those affected by the Taliban.

The incident took place just a day after another separate terrorist incident in Faisalabad.

== See also ==
- List of terrorist incidents in Pakistan since 2001
