= 1995 Peshawar bombing =

Terrorist incident in Pakistan

A car bomb exploded on 21 December 1995 outside a department store in Saddar Bazaar, Peshawar, North-West Frontier Province, Pakistan. It killed at least 32 people and injured over 100 others. Those killed include a daughter and two grandchildren of the Governor of North-West Frontier Province, Khurshid Ali Khan.
