= Assassination of Nasrullah Khan Afridi =

2011 bombing in Peshawar, Pakistan

Coordinates: 33.921°N 71.509°E

May 2011 Peshawar bombing
- Location: Peshawar, Pakistan
- Date: 10 May 2011; 9:15 p.m. (PST+5)
- Target: Nasrullah Khan Afridi
- Attack type: Car bombing, assassination
- Deaths: 1
- Victim: Nasrullah Khan Afridi

The May 2011 Peshawar bombing occurred in Peshawar, Pakistan, when a car bomb was detonated as journalist Nasrullah Khan Afridi (c. 1971-10 May 2011) got into his car after leaving the Tribal Union of Journalists offices. The bomb instantly killed Afridi. No one has been suspected or arrested for the attack. As a tribal journalist, Afridi made many enemies through his journalism. The incident took place in Peshawar's Khyber super market.

== Nasrullah Khan Afridi ==
Nasrullah Khan Afridi had been a journalist for 10 years. The Committee to Protect Journalists said Afridi was a role model journalist in the tribal areas of Pakistan. Afridi worked for the Urdu-language newspaper, Mashriq, before he died. He left behind three sons, three daughters, and a widow.

== Bombing ==
The attack took place late in the evening and was targeted at Nasrullah Khan Afridi. His compressed natural gas tank exploded by a remote controlled car bomb as he got into his car. According to The Tribune, Nasrullah had faced many death threats in the past, particularly from a known militant organisation named Lashkar-e-Islam. Nasrullah Afridi's reporting on terrorist organisations were the main cause of the death threats. Lashkar-e-Islam announced a death threat on Afridi on a pirate radio station in 2006. Almost four years before his death, a grenade was thrown into Afridi's house on 21 May 2007. No one has been found responsible for 10 May 2011 bombing, although sources told Reporters Without Borders that Lashkar-e-Islam is suspect to the killing of Nasrullah Khan Afridi.

== Context ==
Journalists reporting in tribal areas with militant groups face many dangers, for tribes at war and militant groups do not tolerate the media, says The Tribune. The Tribal Union of Journalists (TUJ) reports that 30% of tribal journalist members flee the area they report in for their own safety.

Khyber super market in Peshawar is home to many news organisations, making it the perfect place to target reporters who militants find to be a threat. PACT Radio, also set up in Peshawar, reports that the city is becoming more dangerous with frequent attacks on journalists. A month after the May 2011 Peshawar bombing, another bombing occurred, also in the Khyber market area. In this June 2011 Peshawar bombings, at least 34 people died and more than 100 were injured.

== Response ==
Irina Bokova, who is the director-general of UNESCO, made a statement shortly after the Khyber super market bombing saying, "It is with great concern about the high number of journalists killed in Pakistan that I condemn the killing of Nasrulla Afridi. The time has come for serious action against those who use violence to silence the all important voice of the press."

Mian Iftikhar Hussain, Khyber Pakhtunkhwa Province's information minister, said, "Journalists are being targeted because they are writing the truth and those [militants] don't like the truth."

Hundreds of people attended the memorial service for Nasrullah Afridi says CPJ. Soon after the bombing, a memorial football tournament was created in Nasrullah Afridi's honour. On 5 November 2011, political agent, Sayed Ahmad Jan, inaugurated the first football match for Afridi in Jamrud of Pakistan.

== See also ==
- List of terrorist incidents in Pakistan since 2001
- List of terrorist incidents, 2009
