= 2016 Peshawar bus bombing =

Terrorist attack in Pakistan

- Part of War in North-West Pakistan
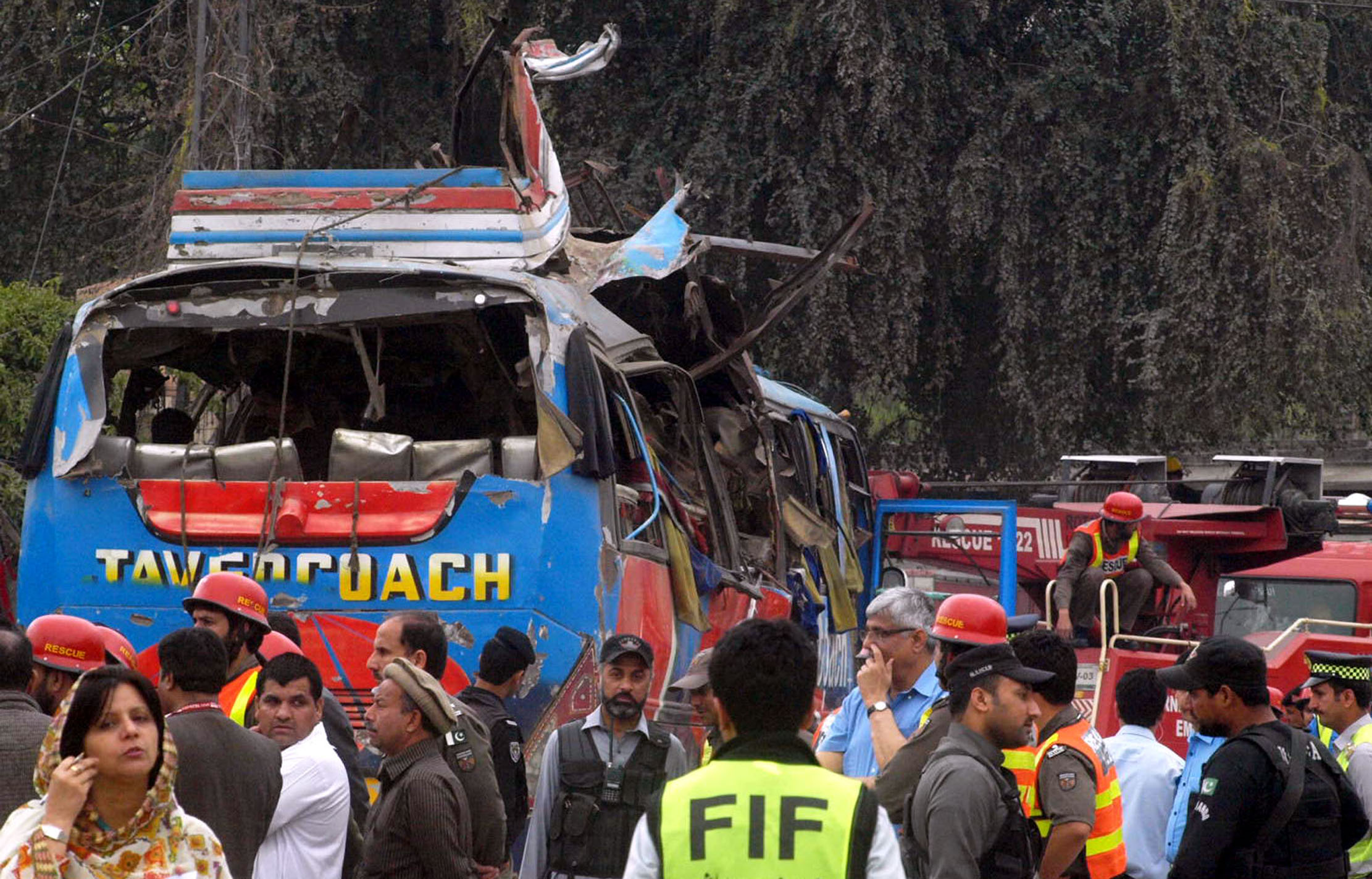
- Location: Peshawar, Pakistan
- Date: 16 March 2016
- Target: Civilians, Government employees
- Attack type: Mass murder
- Weapon: Bomb
- Deaths: 15
- Injuries: 25

On 16 March 2016, bomb detonated in a bus carrying government employees in Peshawar, Pakistan, killing 15 and injuring at least 30. The explosion occurred on Sunehri Masjid Road. The bomb had been hidden on the bus, and was apparently detonated remotely. A group aligned with the Pakistani Taliban claimed responsibility for the bombing.
