= 2023 Peshawar mosque bombing =

Suicide attack in Pakistan

- Part of the insurgency in Khyber Pakhtunkhwa
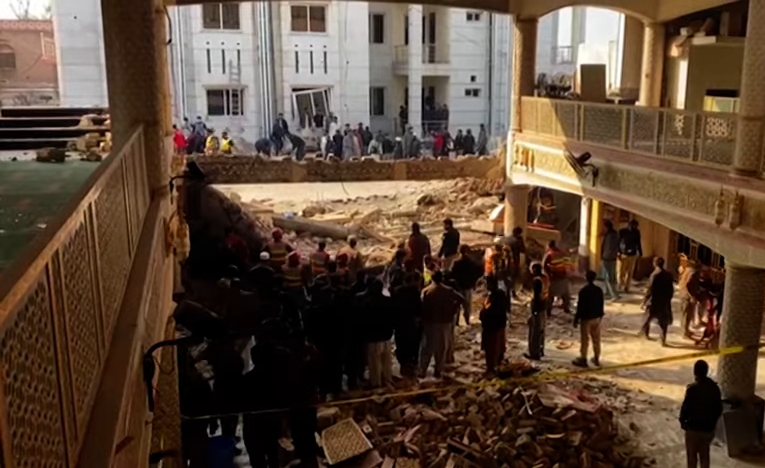
- Internal view of the mosque after the bombing.
- Location: 34°00′47″N 71°33′34″E; Police Lines area, Peshawar, Khyber Pakhtunkhwa, Pakistan
- Date: 30 January 2023; 13:30 PKT (UTC+05:00)
- Target: Khyber Pakhtunkhwa Police officers
- Attack type: Suicide bombing
- Deaths: 85 (including the perpetrator)
- Injuries: 217
- Perpetrators: Pakistani Taliban (denied by TTP): Jamaat-ul-Ahrar faction
- Motive: Revenge for the Death of Omar Khalid Khorasani

On 30 January 2023, at around 1:30 p.m. Pakistan Standard Time (UTC+5), a suicide bomber set off an explosion within the Police Lines mosque of Peshawar in Khyber Pakhtunkhwa, Pakistan, killing 84 people and injuring 217. The mosque, located within a high-security compound containing several government offices, including the headquarters of the Khyber Pakhtunkhwa Police, was infiltrated by the perpetrator after he had disguised himself as a police officer, allowing him to pass through several security checkpoints and join the congregational Zuhr prayers. The bombing destroyed a wall and the roof of the mosque, burying hundreds of people under the rubble.

Jamaat-ul-Ahrar, a splinter faction of the internationally designated terrorist group Tehrik-e-Taliban Pakistan (TTP), claimed responsibility for the bombing, stating that it was carried out to avenge the death of their founder and former leader Omar Khalid Khorasani. Shortly after their claim, the TTP issued a statement denying any involvement, though the Pakistani government and other commentators maintain that the group likely knew of and approved the attack. The bombing was widely condemned domestically and internationally, with leaders from around the world expressing condolences to the victims and their families. The United Nations Secretary General's spokeswoman called the bombing "particularly abhorrent" as it took place in a site of worship.

== Background ==
Formed in 2007, the Pakistani Taliban has waged an ongoing insurgency against the Pakistani government in Khyber Pakhtunkhwa province with the goal of ousting the state and enforcing their own interpretation of Sharia law. After waging deadly attacks across the nation during the late 2000s and early 2010s, the TTP's power would significantly diminish after several military offensives conducted against them in 2014 and 2017, forcing the group to mostly retreat into neighbouring Afghanistan. After being driven out, the TTP under the leadership of Noor Wali Mehsud underwent several policy changes and mergers with other militant groups that would allow the organization to rebuild their strength. Among these mergers included the Jamaat-ul-Ahrar in 2020, a previous faction of the TTP which split from them in 2014. After the Afghan Taliban took over Kabul in August 2021, the Pakistani government initially expected that the new Islamic Emirate of Afghanistan would crack down on TTP safe havens within the country. However, the Afghan Taliban, due to being ideological and historical allies with the TTP, refused to do so, resulting in the TTP increasing their attacks throughout Pakistan. After a treaty from June 2022 between the TTP and the government broke down in November, the TTP called on militants to launch attacks across Pakistan. Since then, attacks on Pakistani security forces rose dramatically in Khyber Pakhtunkhwa.

Peshawar, the largest city and capital of Khyber Pakhtunkhwa, has been the scene of various attacks from the TTP and other militants throughout the years. This includes the 2014 Peshawar school massacre, in which nearly 150 people, mostly children, were killed by the TTP as well as a bombing at a Shia mosque in 2022, which was conducted by the Islamic State - Khorasan Province.

== Bombing ==
On 30 January 2023, the perpetrator, an Afghan national identified as "Qari", was picked up by his driver on a motorcycle at Charsadda Mosque and taken to the Rahman Baba Graveyard in Peshawar, where he put on a police uniform and a concealed explosive vest. He was then dropped off within Peshawar's Red Zone near the Police Lines Mosque, which is located inside a high-security compound that includes the headquarters of the provincial police department and counterterrorism offices. CCTV footage shows that the suicide bomber approached the compound wearing his police uniform along with a helmet and mask and pushing a motorcycle as if it was broken down. After parking the motorcycle, he asked a constable for directions to the mosque and then entered it, the guards believing him to be a fellow officer and allowing him to pass through multiple exterior security checkpoints. Over 300 people, mostly police officers, were offering Zuhr prayers at the time that the bomber entered, with the main hall of the mosque having a capacity of around 250 to 300 people. At approximately 1:30 p.m. PST (UTC+5), the perpetrator detonated his vest containing 12 kilograms of trinitrotoluene, the explosion reportedly causing "a huge burst of flames" before a plume of black dust. The blast caused the main hall's wall and inner roof to collapse over the worshippers. Rescue workers arrived shortly after the bombing, though officials stated that most of the people they found had already died.

== Casualties ==
The attack killed 84 people (excluding the perpetrator) and wounded another 217. Initial reporting placed the death count of the attack at 101, but the number was later revised as Khyber Pakhtunkhwa Police Chief Moazzam Jah Ansari stated that some bodies of the victims were mistakenly counted twice. Of the 84 victims, 83 were police officers while one was a female civilian worker at the compound.

== Responsibility ==
Shortly after the bombing, Jamaat-ul-Ahrar leader Omar Mukaram Khurasani, along with senior member Sarbakaf Mohmand claimed responsibility for the attack in a Twitter post. Khurasani stated that bombing was conducted in retaliation to the death of Jamaat-ul-Ahrar founder and former leader Omar Khalid Khorasani, whom he states that Pakistani security forces had killed in August 2022. However, later on in the day TTP spokesperson Muhammad Khorasani issued a statement through Umar Media, their official propaganda source, denying any responsibility for the attack, stating that the TTP has a policy that prohibits them from conducting any attacks within mosques. The statement did not comment on the previous claims of responsibility for the attack, nor did Jamaat-ul-Ahrar leaders issue a follow up statement.

=== Analysis ===
The TTP is an umbrella organization comprising a plethora of different factions, including Jamaat-ul-Ahrar. American terrorism commentator Bill Roggio suggested that Jamaat-ul-Ahrar may have launched the attack without the knowledge or approval of TTP leadership. However, he states that the more likely situation was that the TTP was aware of the bombing and denies responsibility regardless, possibly relying on the fact that the groups relationships between their central leaders and various factions are complex and often confusing, giving them a level of plausible deniability. The International Crisis Group maintains that the TTP likely knew of Jamaat-ul-Ahrar's plans for the bombing, but subsequently backtracked on claiming it in fear of negative backlash towards the Taliban government in Afghanistan, who are housing TTP safehavens.

== Reactions ==
=== Domestic ===
Pakistani Prime Minister Shehbaz Sharif condemned the bombing, stating that the attack was incompatible with Islam and that the entirety of Pakistan stands against the "menace of terrorism". Former prime minister Imran Khan condemned the bombing, saying, "It is imperative we improve our intelligence gathering and properly equip our police forces to combat the growing threat of terrorism." The attack was also condemned by Interior Minister Rana Sanaullah and Foreign Minister Bilawal Bhutto Zardari.

On 1 February 2023, dozens of police officers protested in Peshawar demanding that the government open an investigation into the bombing and how the perpetrator managed to infiltrate the compound. Throughout February 2023, protests amassing thousands of people would be held across Khyber Pakhtunkhwa against militarism and government inaction.

=== International ===
The bombing drew condemnation from India, Canada, China, the United States, Saudi Arabia, the United Arab Emirates, Qatar, and the United Nations, with Secretary General António Guterres' spokesperson saying "it is particularly abhorrent that such an attack occurred at a place of worship."

Afghan Foreign Minister Amir Khan Muttaqi denied that the perpetrators had conducted the attack from Afghan soil, stating that the Pakistani government should pursue a solution to curb militant activity in their country.

== Aftermath ==
On 20 June 2023, Sarbakaf Mohmand, one of the main perpetrators of the bombing and a commander of Jamaat-ul-Ahrar and the TTP, died in Afghanistan. His death was the result of infighting between Jamaat ul-Ahrar and other factions within the TTP, with some suspecting that he had been poisoned by Noor Wali Mehsud in a power struggle.

On 12 November 2024, Pakistani authorities arrested a police officer accused of facilitating the bombing. During his confession, constable Muhammad Wali stated that through Facebook he had been in contact with a Jamaat-ul-Ahrar recruiter identified as "Junaid" from Afghanistan in 2021, convincing him to travel through the Chaman border crossing and join the group in the same year, receiving 20,000 rupees in return. While returning to Pakistan he was arrested by Afghan authorities but subsequently released after intervention from Jamaat-ul-Ahrar. In January 2023 Wali sent pictures and a map of the police compound to his handler via Telegram. On the day of the attack, Wali dropped off the bomber near the mosque after providing him with a police uniform and suicide vest and conducted reconnaissance while he carried out the bombing. The suspect reportedly received 200,000 rupees through the hundi-hawala system after the bombing and had also been involved in coordinating several other Jamaat-ul-Ahrar attacks prior to his capture.

On 12 November 2025, Qari Hidayatullah, another key perpetrator of the bombing, was killed in an explosion in Nangarhar province, Afghanistan. He was also responsible for the 2015 Meena Bazar bombing in Pakistan.

== See also ==
- 2014 Peshawar school massacre
- Sectarian violence in Pakistan
- Terrorism in Pakistan
- List of terrorist incidents in 2023
  - Terrorist incidents in Pakistan in 2023
- Timeline of Peshawar
