= June 2013 Pakistan bombings =

Series of terrorist attack in Pakistan on 30 June 2013

- Location: Quetta, Peshawar and North Waziristan
- Date: 30 June 2013
- Attack type: Bombing
- Deaths: 52
- Injuries: 119

June 2013 Pakistan bombings was the series of terrorist attack in Pakistan on 30 June 2013. The attacks took place in Hazara Town, Quetta, in Peshawar and in Miranshah, North Waziristan which kills 52 and 119 others injured. The attacks came on the day when UK Prime Minister David Cameron visited Pakistan.

== Attacks ==
The bombings took place in three different areas of Pakistan. One attack near a Shiite Muslim mosque in Hazara Town, Quetta, in which at least 28 people were killed. Another attack near the Badhaber Police Station in Peshawar, in which 18 people were killed. The other was at a checkpoint in Miranshah, North Waziristan, in which four security officers were killed.

== See also ==
- List of massacres in Pakistan
