= June 2011 Peshawar bombings =

Terrorist incident in Pakistan

- June 2011 Peshawar bombings (Pakistan)
- Date: 12 June 2011
- Attack type: Suicide bombing
- Deaths: 34+
- Injuries: 100+
- Perpetrator: Unknown

The June 2011 Peshawar bombings occurred on 12 June 2011 in Peshawar, Khyber Pakhtunkhwa, Pakistan. At least 34 people were killed, and more than 90 were injured, when two bombs exploded in a market around midnight. Three people were hurt when the first bomb exploded at 11:50 p.m. local time in the commercial and residential area of Khyber market. After a crowd gathered in the area, a teen-aged suicide bomber on a motorcycle set off a second explosion, killing many people on the spot. About 10 kilograms (22 lb) of explosives were used in the second blast according to officials. Police and rescue teams soon reached the spot and cordoned off the area.

== Death of two journalists ==
Two journalists, Asfandyar Abid Naveed (ca. 1976 – 11 June 2011), also reported as Asfandyar Khan, a career journalist working for Akhbar-e-Khyber, and Shafiullah Khan (ca. 1983 – 17 June 2011), of The News, were killed as a result of covering the double suicide bombing in Peshawar. Naveed died at the scene from the second blast. His death in the attack prompted calls among Pakistan's professional journalism organisations for more attention to be placed on the safety of journalists and for more action by police.

Shafiullah Khan was a trainee reporter for The News. He hailed from Palangzai village in North Waziristan. Khan had recently completed a master's degree in journalism from Gomal University in Dera Ismail Khan. He had been working as a trainee for one week in the Peshawar bureau of The News before the deadly bombings, according to the Khyber Union of Journalists, an affiliate of the Pakistan Federal Union of Journalists (PFUJ). Khan received third degree burns after the second blast was set off after military and media arrived. Khan was transferred to the Khyber Teaching Hospital's (KTH) burn unit. Doctors said he also received metal shrapnel in his right shoulder. A week later, 17 June 2011, Khan died in the burn treatment center in Wah Cantonment, a military center east of Islamabad.

Just one month before this bombing, journalist Nasrullah Khan Afridi, of the Khyber News Agency, PTV News, Daily Mashriq, had been killed 10 May 2011, in the same Khyber Super Market as the other two journalists.

== Responsibility ==
While the Taliban were suspected to have carried out the attack, the Pakistani Taliban spokesperson Ehsanullah Ehsan denied responsibility and blamed the attack on "foreign agents." "We did not carry out this attack in Peshawar. It is an attempt by foreign secret agencies who are doing it to malign us. We do not target innocent people. Our targets are very clear, we attack security forces, government and people who are siding with it." In Pakistan, references made to 'foreign agencies' are well-circulated conspiracy theories and rumours that point to alleged CIA activities in Pakistan and the perception that covert American agents are carrying out an orchestrated campaign of terrorism in the country to destabilise it.

The Committee to Protect Journalists believe the attacks were politically motivated. The organisation listed both journalists' deaths as a result of a dangerous assignment.

== See also ==
- List of armed conflicts and attacks, January – June 2011
- List of terrorist incidents in Pakistan since 2001
