= 2007 Peshawar hotel bombing =

Terrorist incident in Pakistan

Coordinates: 34.00609°N 71.564340°E

On 15 May 2007, a suicide bombing occurred at the Marhaba hotel in Peshawar, Khyber Pakhtunkhwa, Pakistan. It killed 24 people, including the hotel owner and two of his sons, and injured another 30. The hotel in Peshawar's old city was reportedly popular with tribal visitors from Afghanistan.
