= Qissa Khwani Bazaar =

Qissa Khwani Bazaar قصہ خوانۍ بازار
- Bazaar and neighbourhood
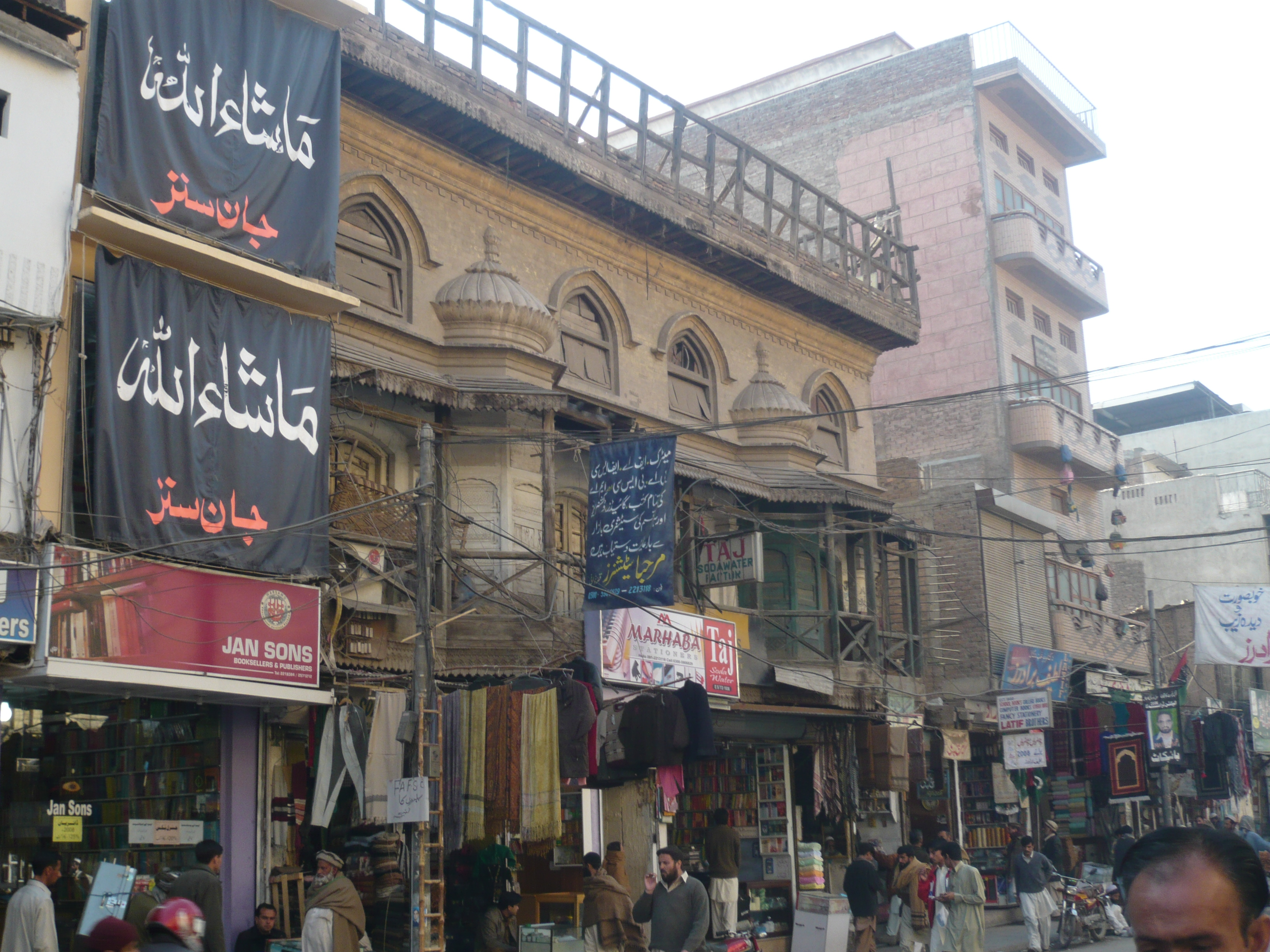
- The bazaar still features examples of traditional style architecture.
- Interactive map of Qissa Khwani Bazaar
- Coordinates: 34.008009°N 71.570126°E
- Country: Pakistan
- Province: Khyber Pakhtunkhwa
- City: Peshawar
- Locality: Andar Shehr

The Qissa Khwani or Kissa Khwani Bazaar (Pashto: قصه خوانۍ بازار, Urdu: قصہ خوانی بازار; lit. "Story-tellers market") is a bazaar in Peshawar, the capital of the Khyber Pakhtunkhwa province of Pakistan.

== Background ==
The Khyber Pakhtunkhwa (then North-West Frontier Province) province Gazetteer, traveller Lowell Thomas and Peshawar's British commissioner Herbert Edwardes called it "the Piccadilly of Central Asia".

== History ==
On 23 April 1930, British Indian Army troops opened fire on a crowd of anti-colonial protestors at the Qissa Khwani Bazaar, killing nearly 400 people. The colonial authorities ultimately acknowledged that the British Indian Army had killed 179 people in the massacre, which triggered protests across India and catapulted the newly formed Khudai Khidmatgar movement into prominence.

In 2010, 25 people were killed in a bomb attack at a protest against electricity shortages. The market was again targeted by militants in 2013, who used a 220 kg bomb to carry out an attack that killed over 40 people, and damaged a nearby mosque as well as set fire to several historic wooden buildings.

On 4 March 2022, 63 people were killed and 196 others wounded in a suicide attack at a mosque during Jumma prayer.

Kissa Khwani Bazaar is famous for Chai and Qehwa houses, and also because several famous Indian movie actors originated from this area. Indian film actor Dilip Kumar was born in Qissa Khwani Bazaar on 11 December 1922. Actor Raj Kapoor and his uncle, actor Trilok Kapoor were also born in the area. Actor Shah Rukh Khan's family still lives in the area.

== Gallery ==
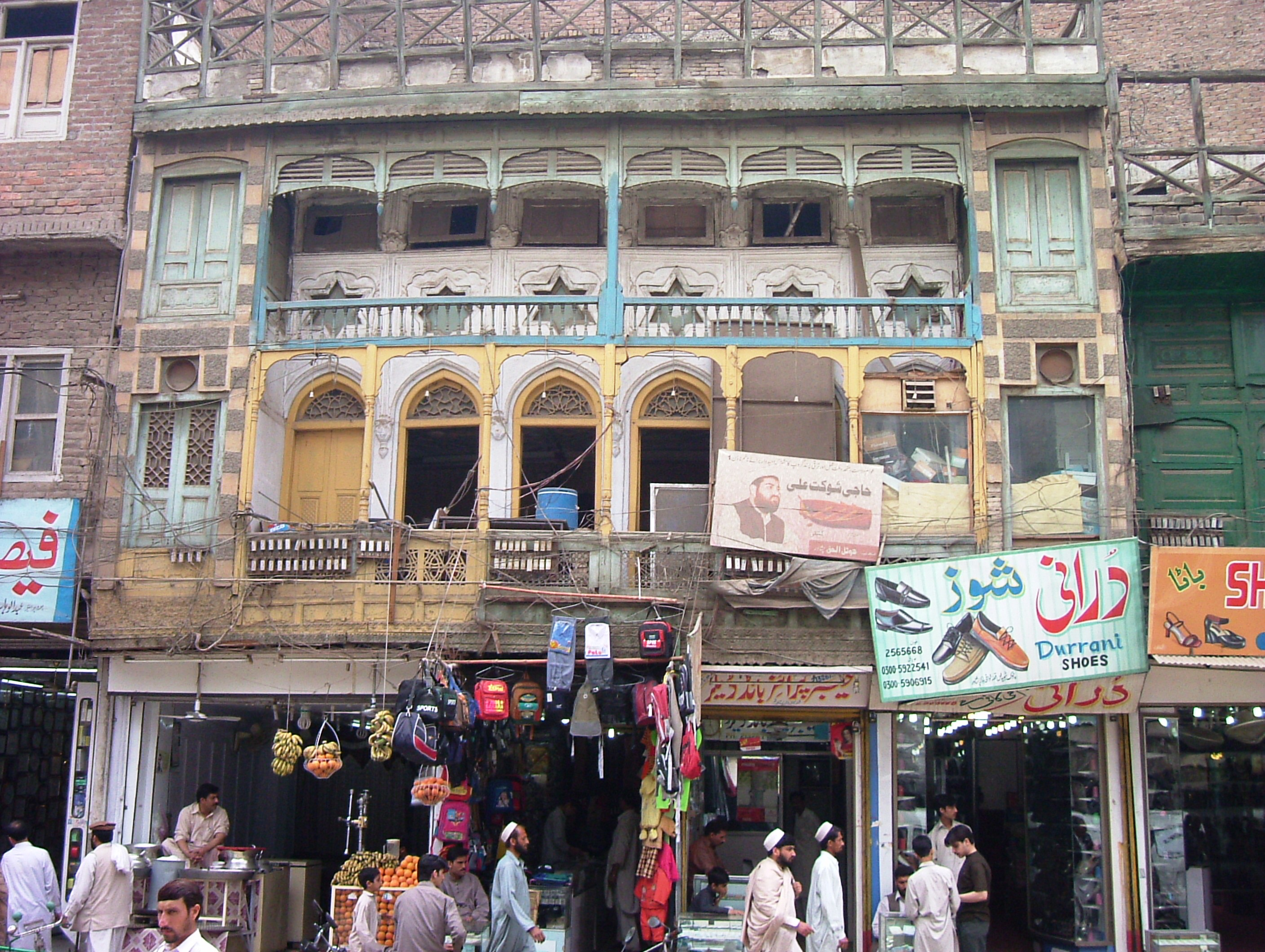

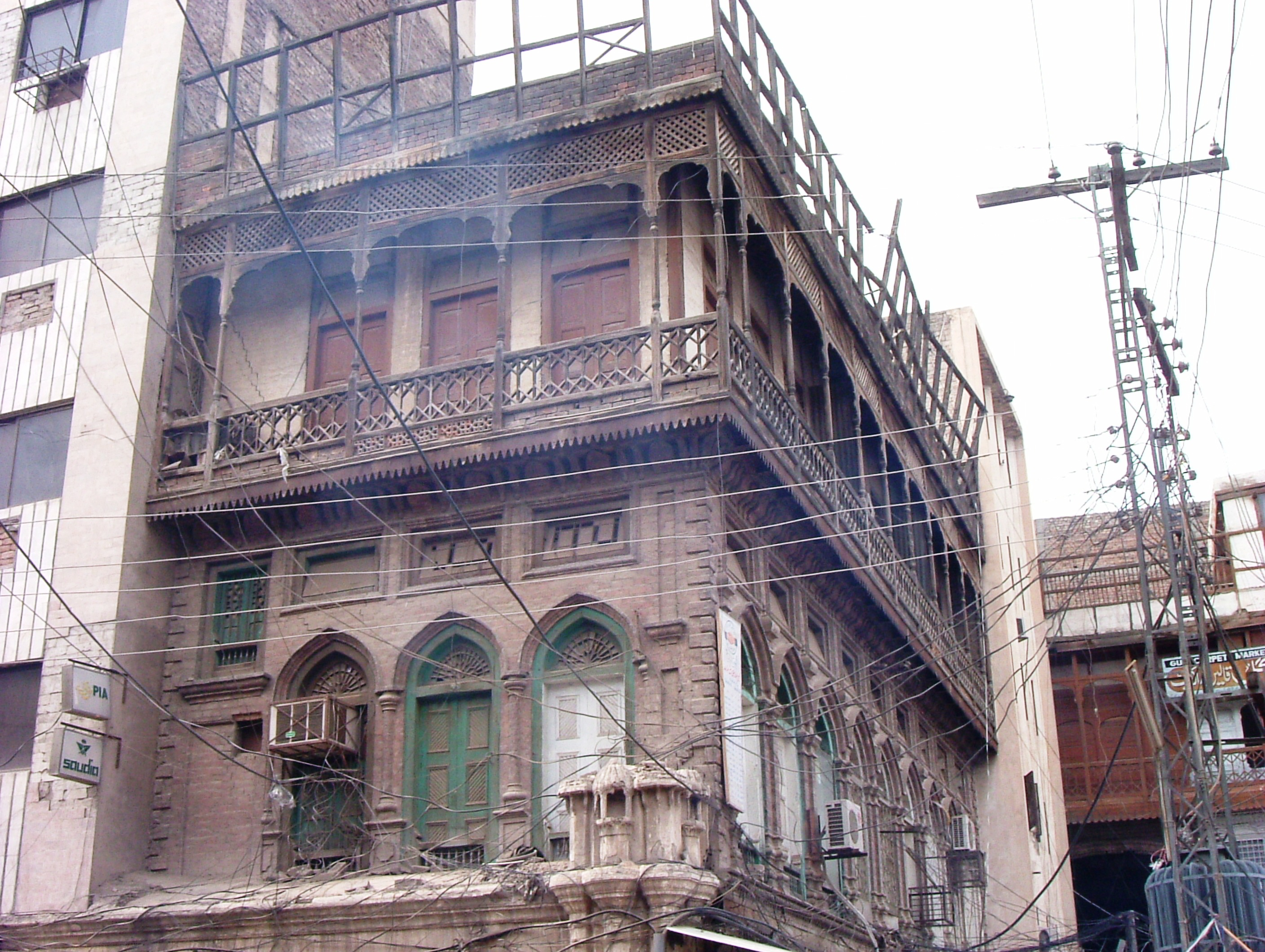

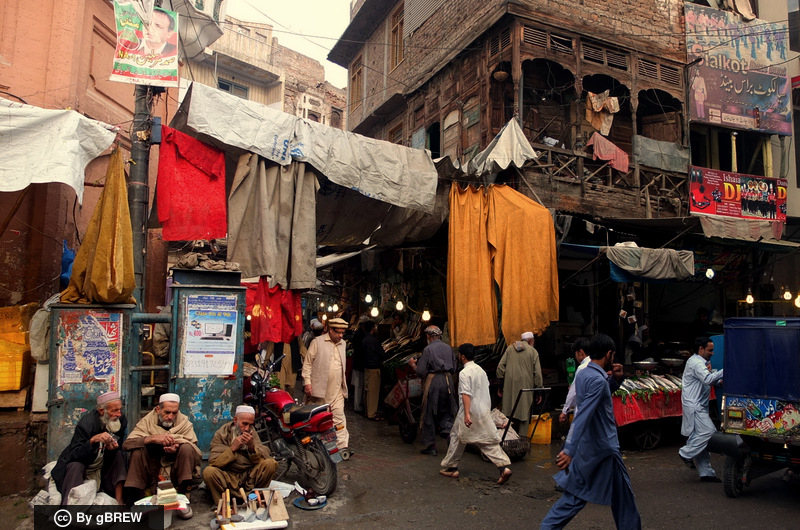

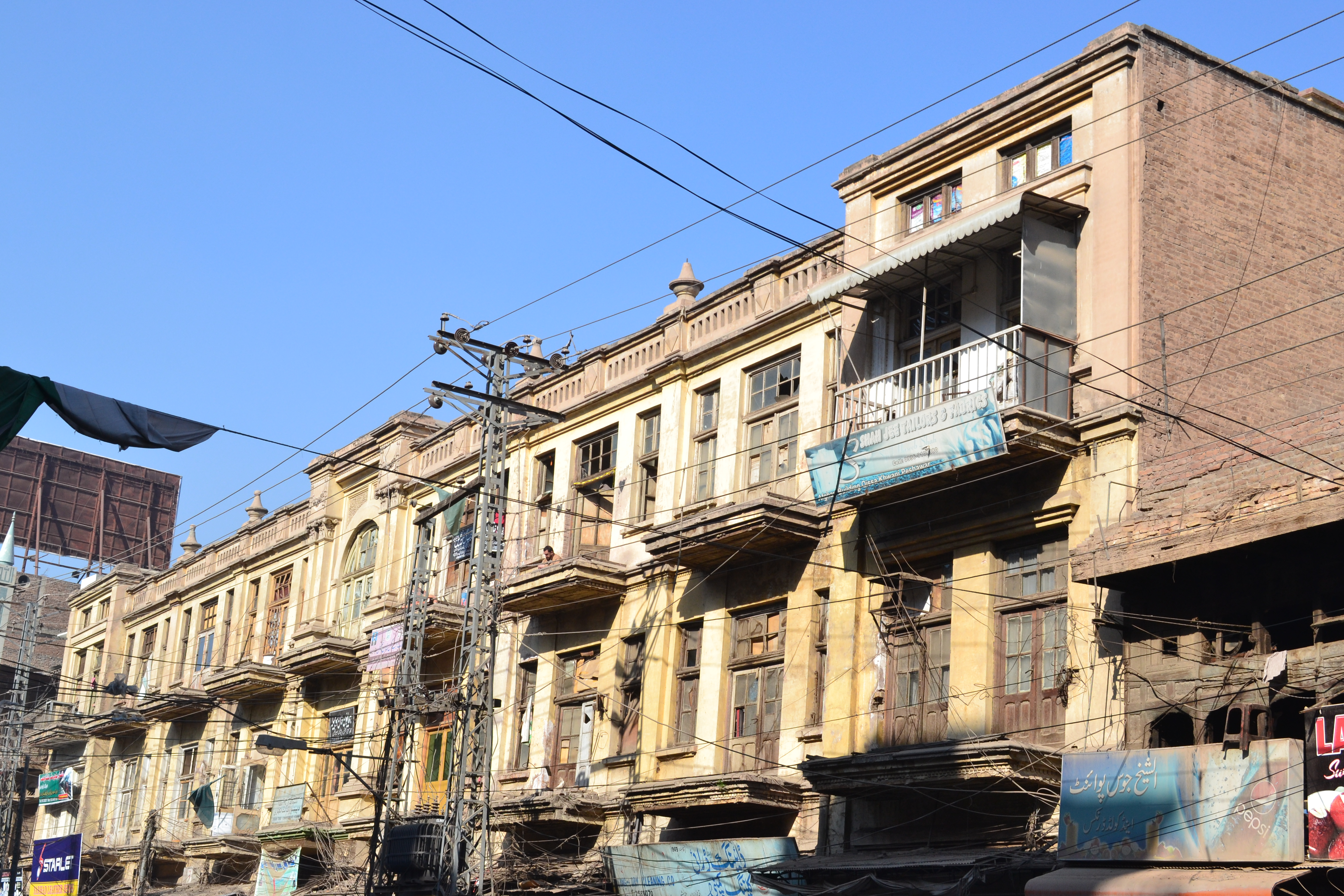
Afghan Building

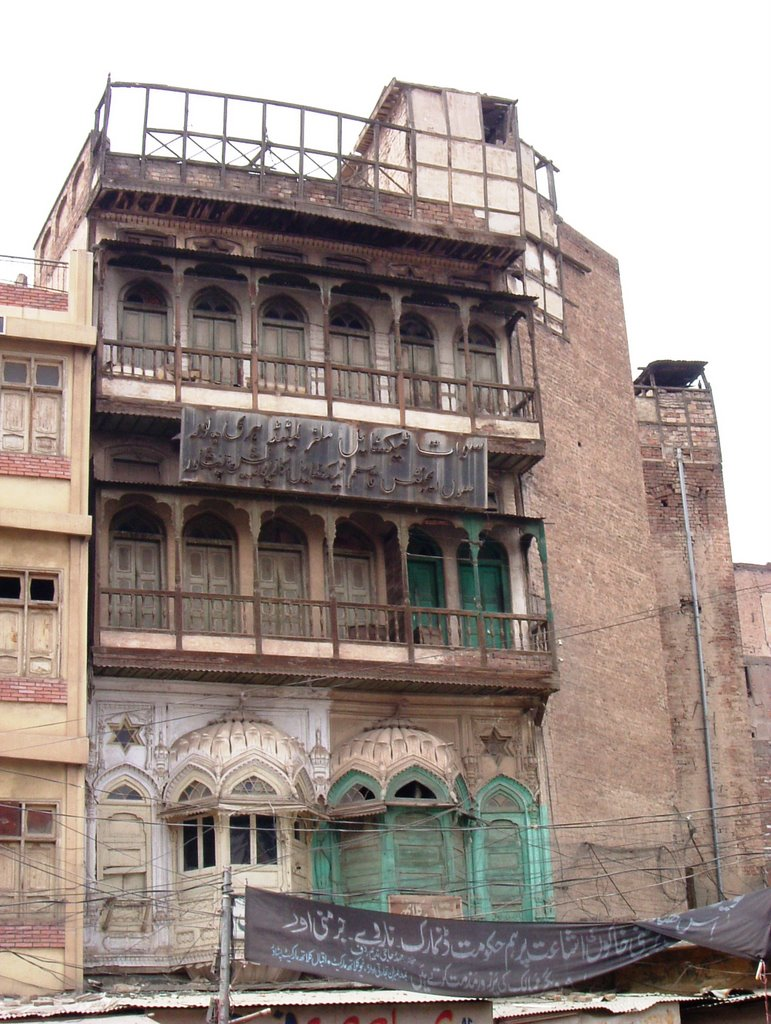

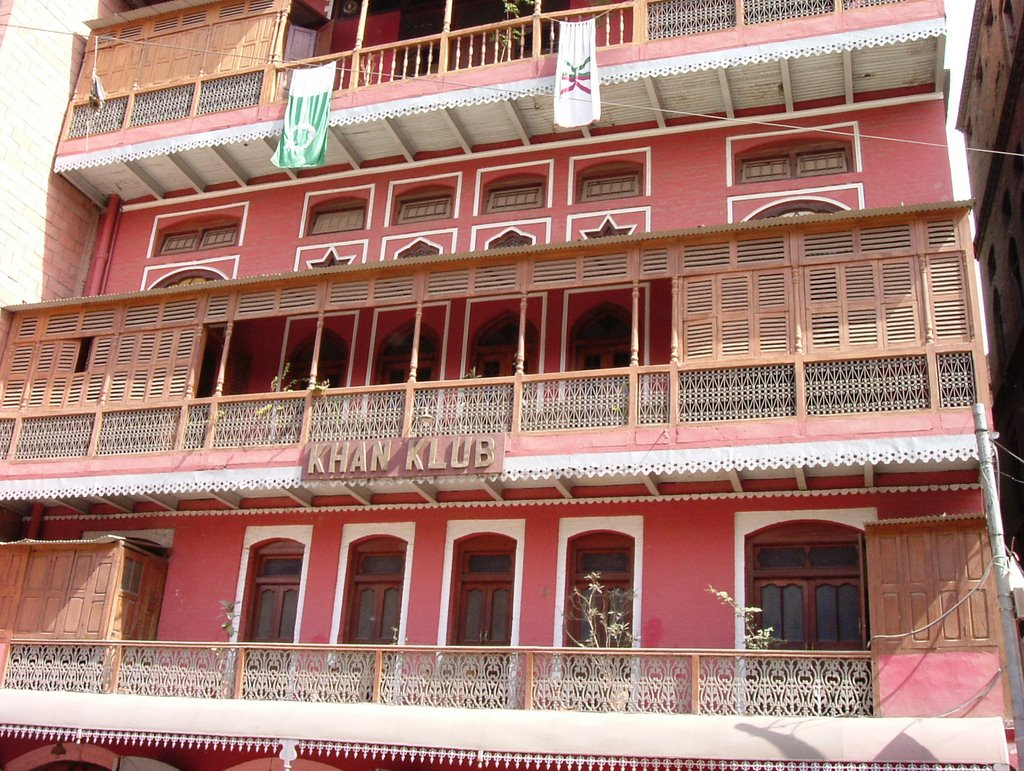
Some older buildings have been renovated and altered

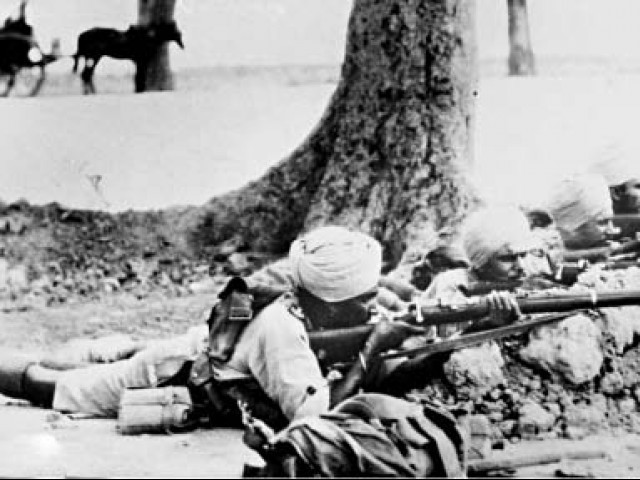
British Indian Army soldiers in Peshawar during the 1930 massacre

== Notable people ==
- Surinder Kapoor, father of actors/producers Anil, Boney, and Sanjay Kapoor
- The Kapoor family of Bollywood has their roots here after their ancestors left Samundri and settled here before permanently migrating to Mumbai
- Ancestors of Shah Rukh Khan
- Dilip Kumar
- Nasir Khan

== See also ==
- Market (place)
- Retail
- Souq
