= Pearl Continental hotel bombing =

2009 bombing by the Tehrik-i-Taliban in Peshawar, Pakistan

Coordinates: 34°34′N 71°32′E

- Location: Peshawar, Pakistan
- Date: 9 June 2009
- Attack type: bombing, shooting
- Deaths: 17
- Injuries: 46
- Perpetrator: Tehrik-i-Taliban Pakistan

The Pearl Continental hotel bombing occurred on 9 June 2009 in Peshawar, Pakistan, in which 17 people were killed and at least 46 people injured. The blast occurred at the five-star Pearl Continental hotel in the city. The force of the explosion caused the hotel to partially collapse. Gunman also attacked the hotel, firing several shots at survivors. The United States had planned to purchase this hotel to convert it to a consulate.

Malik Naveed, a provincial police chief, stated that at least 11 people had died but that the death toll was likely to rise. At least 46 others have been injured. Other sources gave tolls of 16 and 18. It was further reported on 10 June that the official death toll had reached 17 as six more bodies were recovered from the debris of the damaged portion of the hotel.

== Bombing ==
Different reports gave different accounts of the bombing. These included reports of a double-car bomb, truck bomb, suicide bomber and a combined gunman-suicide attack. The bomb ignited a large fire, which spread throughout the hotel. In addition, gunshots continued after the bombing. The bomb also damaged "dozens" of vehicles.

Witnesses and one security official have since stated that the perpetrators travelled to the hotel in a delivery pick-up vehicle. They stormed the hotel, firing several shots before the explosion, described as "a big bomb" by a police spokesperson, which led to a fire engulfing the hotel. According to police official Shafqat Malik, "More than 500 kg (1,100 lb) of explosive material was used in the blast."

Most of the foreigners caught in the blast were working with aid agencies helping internally displaced persons. An official of the United Nations High Commissioner for Refugees from Serbia, Aleksandar Vorkapić, was among those killed; Perseveranda So, a Filipino employee of UNICEF also died. Three UN employees from Germany, Somalia, and the UK were wounded. It has been reported that four personnel of Xe (Blackwater, now Academi) were killed in the blast.

== Casualties ==
Deaths by nationality
Country	Number
Pakistan	15
Serbia	1
Philippines	1
Total	17

Journalists have claimed that some of the injured are from outside Pakistan. Hospital officials have also stated that there are victims from outside the country. One doctor said, "We have received 46 injured people including five foreigners."

== Responsibility ==
A little-known Pakistani militant group, Fedayeen al-Islam, told the BBC it had carried out the attack with the aim of stopping interference by the United States in Pakistan. However, on 11 June 2009, a previously unknown group calling itself the Abdullah Azzam Shaheed Brigade claimed responsibility for the attack, saying the attack was in response to attacks by Pakistani military forces on Taliban insurgents in the Swat Valley.

== Aftermath ==
Immediately after the blast the United Nations decided to pull its staff from Peshawar, prompting fears about the fate of 2 million internally displaced people who have fled the fighting in the Swat Valley. UNHCR and Pakistani authorities were accused of negligence after failure to transport the body of the officials who were killed in the accident which caused the cancellation of the funeral. UNHCR responded that they are doing everything in their power to solve this issue but that there were unexpected problems.

== Response ==
- Pakistan – Farahnaz Ispahani, a spokesperson for Asif Ali Zardari, was quoted as saying 'This is what you get (for the operation against the Taliban), but we can't give up.'
- Philippines – The Philippines condemned the bombing, which claimed the lives of 11 people, including a Filipino woman. "This senseless terrorist attack on innocent civilians is an unspeakable crime and can never be justified! The Philippine Government affirms its commitment to working with the UN system and Member States in ensuring that this principle is observed," said Philippine Foreign Affairs Secretary Alberto Romulo.
- Serbia – Vesna Petković, a spokesman for the UNHCR Serbia, said, "The High Commissioner for Refugees representation in Serbia is deeply distressed at the loss of our colleague Aleksandar Vorkapić, who lost his life in the senseless bombing of the hotel in Peshawar, where he was temporarily placed".
- United Kingdom – A Foreign Office spokesman said: "We can confirm that one British man has been injured. He is in hospital. We are offering consular assistance." He added: "The UK condemns unreservedly all such acts of indiscriminate terrorism."
- United Nations – Secretary-General Ban Ki-moon was quoted as saying 'The Secretary-General condemns in the strongest possible terms today's terrorist attack on the Pearl Continental Hotel in Peshawar.'
- European Union – EU president Czech Republic condemned the attack saying "No cause can justify such acts"
- China – Chinese Foreign Ministry spokesman Qin Gang said "China strongly condemns the terrorist attack and extends its deep condolences to the victims and their families."

== See also ==
- List of terrorist incidents, 2009
- List of terrorist incidents in Pakistan since 2001
- List of massacres in Pakistan
