= 19 April 2010 Peshawar bombing =

Terrorist incident in Pakistan

Coordinates: 34.023836°N 71.620973°E

2010 Peshawar bombing
- Part of War in North-West Pakistan
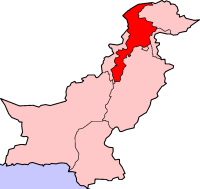
- Location of North-West Frontier Province in Pakistan
- Location: Peshawar, North-West Frontier Province, Pakistan
- Date: 19 April 2010
- Deaths: 25

The 19 April 2010 Peshawar bombing was a suicide bombing that occurred in a marketplace in Peshawar, Pakistan. At least 25 people died and around 27 individuals were injured. The explosion was the second to have occurred in the city that day, the first of which killed several children near a city school.

The blast, which happened in Qissa Khawani market, an area in the old city that is also referred to as the Storytellers' Bazaar, killed Dost Muhammad, the local leader of Jamaat-e-Islami, who was leading a protest against load shedding. The attack happened at about 6:30 pm local time. Witnesses saw the suicide bomber arrive on foot and proceed to detonate his explosives, near the demonstration of the Jamaat-e-Islami, a group that is reportedly sympathetic to the Taliban.

The attack also appeared to target senior police officer Gulfat Hussein, a Shia Muslim. According to a statement released by the provincial information minister Iftikhar Hussain, the suicide bomber blew himself up near the policemen sitting in their vehicles after the rally. some of the wounded included members of the police. The government declared three days of mourning after the bombing.

== See also ==
- List of terrorist incidents, 2010
- List of terrorist incidents in Pakistan since 2001
