= Terrorist incidents in Pakistan in 2020 =

This article is an incomplete outline of terrorist incidents in Pakistan in 2020 in chronological order.

== January ==
- 10 January - January 2020 Quetta bombing

== February ==
- 17 February - February 2020 Quetta bombing

== June ==
- 22 June - A bomb blast occurred at Mazdoor Chowk near the security check post in the city of Parachinar, Kurram tribal district. Two people, including a police officer, were sustained injuries in it, according to District Police Officer the explosives had been hidden in the garbage at Mazdoor Chowk where a large number of laborers were present at the Chowk, but most of them had already left the place for work when the explosion took place. In 2007, 2008, and 2017 there were also bomb blasts near the site, killing more than 100 people.
- 29 June - Pakistan Stock Exchange attack

== July ==
- 23 July an incident occurred in Turi Bazar which is the main market in the city of Parachinar when explosives planted on a vending cart went off as people were out buying fruit and vegetables. At least 20 people including a child were injured in that blast and soon after the bombing, protesters came out onto the streets and staged a sit-in in front of the local press club. Also in 2012 and 2017, near the same site, nearly 200 people were killed and 460 others wounded in the suicide bomb blasts.
- 29 July - A soldier was killed in a terrorist attack at Bajaur security post.

== August ==
- 5 August – At least 39 people were injured in an RGD-1 grenade attack on a Jamaat-i-Islami rally in the Gulshan-e-Iqbal neighborhood of Karachi. The Sindhudesh Revolutionary Army claimed responsibility for the attack.
- 10 August – A bomb killed at least 5 people and several others were injured in Chaman, Balochistan.

== October ==
- 16 October -
  - An attack kills least 7 soldiers and 7 security guards in Balochistan.
  - A bomb kills at least 6 members of the Army in North Waziristan.
- 21 October - At least 5 people were killed and 27 others were injured in an explosion at an apartment building in Karachi.
- 27 October - Eight students were killed in a bombing at a school in Peshawar, Khyber Pakhtunkhwa.
