= 9 October 2009 Peshawar bombing =

Terrorist incident in Pakistan

- Location: Peshawar, Pakistan
- Date: 9 October 2009 (PST+5)
- Target: Khyber Bazaar
- Attack type: Minibus bomb
- Deaths: 41
- Injuries: 100+

The 9 October 2009 Peshawar bombing was a minibus bomb that was detonated at the crowded Khyber Bazaar in Peshawar on 9 October 2009 killing 41 and injuring at least 100.

== See also ==
- List of terrorist incidents in Pakistan since 2001
- List of terrorist incidents, 2009
