= Peshawar church bombing =

2013 suicide bombing in Pakistan

- Part of the Insurgency in Khyber Pakhtunkhwa
- Location: 34°00′19″N 71°34′16″E; Peshawar, Khyber Pakhtunkhwa, Pakistan
- Date: 22 September 2013
- Target: Christians
- Attack type: Suicide bombings, Islamic terrorism, mass murder, religious hate crime
- Weapon: Suicide belts
- Deaths: 127
- Injuries: 250
- Perpetrator: Jundallah
- Assailants: 2 suicide bombers
- Motive: Anti-Christian sentiment

On 22 September 2013, a twin suicide bombing took place at All Saints Church in Peshawar, Pakistan, in which 127 people were killed and more than 250 injured. It was the deadliest attack on the Christian minority in the history of Pakistan.

== Bombs ==
The two suicide bombers shot two security guards, killing one and injuring the other. Stopped by the police, one of the bombers detonated his explosives. The second bomber entered the church and detonated the bomb inside. Another account tells that the suicide bomb blast occurred when the worshippers assembled for a free meal of rice near the front lawn of the church. The intensity of the blasts left holes in the walls of the church and shattered the windows of nearby buildings. Bodies of the attackers were successfully identified and sent for examination. Their suicide vests were made with 6 kilograms (13 lb) of explosives inside.

== Perpetrators of the attack ==
The Tehrik-i-Taliban Pakistan-linked Islamist group Jundallah claimed responsibility for the attack. They said that the attack on Christians and non-Muslims will continue because they are the enemies of Islam and that they will not stop until US drone attacks in Pakistan cease. However, Tehrik-i-Taliban Pakistan denied any involvement in the incident and denied having any links with the perpetrators, saying that their affiliate is Jundul Hafsa, not Jundallah.

== Response of Pakistani Christians ==
Christians residing near the church went to the streets and started protesting by burning tires and shouting slogans. Many shops were shut in the Kohati Gate area, which is home to many other churches. There were protest rallies in Karachi, Lahore, Multan and other cities to condemn the killing. There were also clashes reported in Karachi between angry protestors and police.

Christian communities in Pakistan lamented "the dying future for Christians in Pakistan" given this was another in a series of recent attacks. In March, hundreds of Christians were persecuted by Islamic zealots over allegations of blasphemy against Islam, a crime under Pakistani law.

== Reactions ==
Prime Minister Nawaz Sharif condemned the attack and said terrorists have no religion and that targeting innocent people is against the teachings of Islam.

== See also ==
- 2009 Gojra riots
- 28 October 2009 Peshawar bombing
- 2014 Larkana temple attack
- 2019 Ghotki riots
- Anti-Christian sentiment
- Lahore church bombings
- Qissa Khwani Bazaar bombing
- 2025 Mar Elias Church suicide bombing
