= 2015 Peshawar mosque attack =

Terrorist incident in Pakistan

Peshawar Mosque Attack
- Location: Peshawar, Pakistan
- Date: February 13, 2015
- Attack type: Bombing, Mass Shooting, terrorist attack, Mass Murder,
- Deaths: 20
- Injuries: 65
- Perpetrator: Group Of Taliban Gunmen
- Motive: Unknown

On 13 February 2015, group of armed men wearing uniforms of security forces broke into the Shiite mosque named as Imamia mosque in the city of Peshawar, Pakistan, where people were attending Friday prayers, and opened fire, killing 20 people and injuring 65 others.

== See also ==
- Terrorist incidents in Pakistan in 2015
