= Qissa Khwani Bazaar bombing =

Car bomb attack at the Qissa Khawani Bazaar market in Peshawar, Pakistan

- Part of War in North-West Pakistan
- Location: Qissa Khwani Bazaar, Peshawar, Pakistan
- Date: 29 September 2013
- Attack type: Car bomb
- Deaths: 41
- Injuries: 100

The Qissa Khwani Bazaar bombing took place in the Qissa Khwani Bazaar market in Peshawar, Pakistan on 29 September 2013. A car bomb detonated about 11 a.m. PST in the crowded market, killing 41 people, including 16 from the same family, and wounding about 100 more. Two days earlier, a bus bomb in the city had killed 19 government workers.

== See also ==
- Qissa Khwani Bazaar massacre
- Peshawar church attack
