= 28 October 2009 Peshawar bombing =

Terrorist attack in Pakistan

Coordinates: 34.008723°N 71.575552°E

28 October 2009 Peshawar Market Bombing
- Location: Peshawar, Pakistan
- Date: 28 October 2009; 1300 hrs (UTC+5)
- Target: Meena Bazar
- Attack type: Car bombing, fire
- Weapon: 150 kilograms (330 lb) of explosive
- Deaths: 137
- Injuries: 213

The 28 October 2009 Peshawar bombing occurred in Peshawar, Pakistan, when a car bomb was detonated in a Mina Bazar (market for women and children). The bomb killed 137 people and injured more than 200 others, making it the deadliest attack in Peshawar's history. Pakistani government officials believe the Taliban to be responsible, but both Taliban and Al-Qaeda sources have denied involvement in the attack.

== Bombing ==
The blast was so huge that it jolted the entire
area and within seconds plumes of smoke and dust
started emitting out of a building near Al-Falah Mosque.

— shopkeeper Karim Khan

According to the North West Frontier Province's information minister Mian Iftikhar Hussain, most of the victims were women and children, in the woman-exclusive Peepal Mindi shopping section of Peshawar. The blast originated from a bomb in a car parked outside the city's Mina Bazar. The bomb was said to contain 150 kilograms (330 lb) of explosives, according to bomb squad worker Shafqatullah Malik. The blast caused widespread fires among stores selling flammable fabrics, which caused further damage and casualties; the bomb was stated to be the deadliest since the 2007 Karachi bombing, and the worst in Peshawar's history. The death toll was expected to rise, from an original estimate of 90, as rescuers and civilians sifted through the rubble of a four-story building that was collapsed by the blast; the explosion also collapsed a mosque and damaged four other four-story buildings. Among the dead was a female teacher doing winter shopping for her young children. Many of the wounded were seriously injured and would later succumb to their injuries. According to Mohammad Usman, whose shoulder was wounded, "There was a deafening sound and I was like a blind man for a few minutes... I heard women and children crying and started to help others. There was the smell of human flesh in the air." The location of the bombing, Meena Bazar, usually draws low-income female shoppers.

Pakistani authorities believed that the Taliban were responsible for orchestrating the attack, but the group has denied any involvement. Information minister Hussain stated that the government believed the bombing to be a response to a recent anti-militant operation in South Waziristan.

== Investigations ==
On 24 April 2015 Italian DIGOS detectives arrested a terror cell that plotted to bomb the Vatican. According to Mario Carta, an officer in the anti-terrorism unit, there was evidence that the 2009 Peshawar attack was substantially planned and financed from Olbia, Sardinia, and that Italy-based militants had taken part in it.

== Response ==
United States Secretary of State Hillary Clinton, who was visiting Pakistan, condemned the attacks, saying that the perpetrators were on the "losing side of history". Clinton added, "We commit to stand shoulder to shoulder with the Pakistani people in your fight for peace and security, we will give you the help that you need in order to achieve your goal." Meanwhile, nearby Lady Reading Hospital went into a state of emergency as the injured were transferred there; medical officials pleaded with the public to donate blood for the blast's victims.

A state of emergency has been declared at
the hospital... We don’t even have time to count the bodies.
It's absolutely mayhem here. We have called for blood
donation to meet with the crisis...

— Anonymous medical official

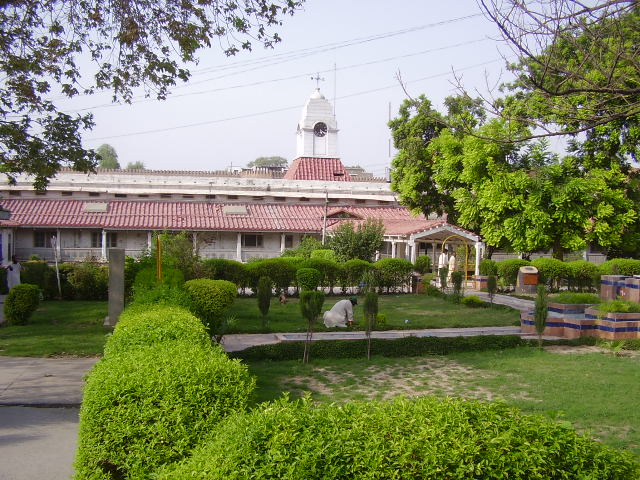
Lady Reading Hospital

Medical staff complained that the authorities were not adequately prepared to deal the repercussions of an attack with so many casualties. According to Muzamil Hussain, a responder, "There are a lot of wounded people. We tried to help them but there were no ambulances so we took the victims on rickshaws and other vehicles." Muzamil Hussain added that, "There were no police. The police and government didn't help us, the police even opened fire on us." Another man claimed that there was only a pretense of security, and that the government was actually unable to stop such attacks. Government officials acknowledged Peshawar's lack of ability to prepare for terrorist attacks, and Azam Khan, the city's senior-most civil servant, stated that, "The police strength of Peshawar cannot secure everything," and explained how the militants had penetrated a "three-ring police cordon" around the city.

Sahibzada Anees, Peshawar's deputy coordination officer, cited the city's lack of trained firefighters, and the inability to move excavating machinery into areas where people had been buried alive because of the city's narrow streets. A local government official added that crowds were hindering rescue efforts, stating how, "People have thronged the scene... They have made it difficult for us to remove the rubble and retrieve bodies and those still alive." All shops in the area were closed after the blast. An inquiry was ordered by NWFP Chief Minister Amir Hyder Khan Hoti.

As many as 60 people were considered unaccounted for as of 30 October.

== Reaction ==
- : President Asif Ali Zardari condemned the attack while Prime Minister Yousaf Raza Gillani denounced the attacks and directed the government officials to provide the best possible treatment to the injured. Foreign Minister Shah Mahmood Qureshi said the violence would not break his government's will to fight back. The resolve and determination will not be shaken," Qureshi said. "People are carrying out such heinous crimes – they want to shake our resolve. I want to address them: We will not buckle. We will fight you. We will fight you because we want peace and stability in Pakistan." NWFP Information Minister Mian Iftikhar Hussain said, "Terrorism cannot be described as jihad as our religion does not allow taking lives of innocent people".
- (Afghanistan) : Afghan president, Hamid Karzai, called Pakistani President Asif Ali Zardari to condemn the Peshawar blast. He also expressed grief over loss of innocent lives.
- (United States) : Secretary of State Hillary Clinton, who was in Pakistan to discuss the growing number of militant attacks in the country, condemned the attacks, stating that the U.S. would "commit to stand shoulder to shoulder with the Pakistani people in your fight for peace and security, we will give you the help that you need in order to achieve your goal."
- : Al-Qaeda sent an e-mail to media outlets stating that they do not explode bombs in bazaars and mosques. They said that separate forces, "who want to defame jihad and refugees, are behind the Peshawar bomb blast."
- (Afghanistan) : Tehrik-i-Taliban Pakistan also condemned the attacks and denied their involvement in the blast.
- United Nations: U.N. Secretary General Ban Ki-moon stated that he wanted to "express my outrage at the loss of so many innocent lives, no cause can justify such inhuman and indiscriminate violence."

== See also ==
- List of terrorist incidents in Pakistan since 2001
- List of terrorist incidents, 2009
- 2019 Ghotki riots
- 2014 Larkana temple attack
- 2009 Gojra riots
