= 2026 attack on the United States consulate in Karachi =

Attack in Pakistan

- Part of protests against the 2026 Iran war, Pakistan in the 2026 Iran war and anti-American sentiment in Pakistan
- Location: 24.8410°N 67.0098°E; Karachi, Pakistan
- Date: March 1, 2026 (PKT, UTC+05:00)
- Target: Consulate General of the United States, Karachi
- Attack type: Protest, arson, riot, vandalism, stone throwing
- Deaths: 10
- Injuries: 60+
- Motive: Reaction to the assassination of Ali Khamenei during the 2026 Iran war

On 1 March 2026, the Consulate General of the United States in Karachi, Pakistan, was targeted by Shia Muslim protesters following strikes on Iran by the US and Israel in which Iranian supreme leader Ayatollah Ali Khamenei was assassinated. As the protesters assaulted the consulate and breached the outer wall, the Marine Security Guards opened fire, killing 10 protesters and injuring over 60.

Protesters set fire and broke windows during the attack. They attempted to enter the consulate and threw stones at constables and Rangers, who responded by pushing them back. At one point, a protester opened fire with a pistol. The police dispersed crowds with tear gas near Mai Kolachi Road, while protesters continued to throw stones along M. T. Khan Road. Additionally, a traffic police post beneath the Sultanabad Bridge was set on fire.

Several roads, including those leading to Namish Chowrangi and from Sultanabad to Mai Kolachi, were closed. Traffic from Jinnah Bridge was redirected to I. I. Chundrigar Road, and vehicles coming from Boat Basin were forced to make a U-turn at Mai Kolachi Phatak.

== Background ==
The protest was triggered by the assassination of Ayatollah Ali Khamenei, Iran's supreme leader since 1989, in a series of US-Israeli airstrikes on Iranian targets on 28 February 2026. Khamenei's death sparked immediate outrage across the Shia Muslim world, leading to calls for demonstrations against the US and Israel.

In Pakistan, a country with a significant Shia minority, pro-Iranian groups mobilized quickly. Protests were organized in multiple cities, including Karachi, Lahore, and Islamabad, with demonstrators chanting anti-US and anti-Israel slogans. Protesters also accused the Pakistani government of siding with the US during the conflict. The US Consulate General in Karachi, located in the high-security zone, became a focal point due to its symbolic representation of American presence in the region.

== Protest ==
The demonstration began in the early morning of 1 March 2026, with hundreds of protesters gathering near the US Consulate on Mai Kolachi Road in Karachi. Protesters, many affiliated with Shia organizations, carried banners condemning the US and Israel and expressed solidarity with Iran. The crowd initially remained peaceful but grew agitated, leading to attempts to breach the consulate's outer wall.

Security forces, including the Sindh Police and Pakistan Rangers, responded with tear gas and batons to prevent entry. Clashes intensified as protesters threw stones, vandalized the building's exterior, and set fire to vehicles. Reports indicate that the US marines stationed at the embassy used gunfire to disperse the crowd, resulting in 10 fatalities and over 60 injuries among the protesters.

The protest lasted several hours before authorities regained control. No breaches of the inner consulate were reported, and US staff remained safe.

== Aftermath ==
Following the protest, the United States Embassy in Islamabad issued a security alert and shut down all US diplomatic facilities across Pakistan. Three protesters were also killed near the embassy. Consulates in Karachi, Lahore, and Peshawar were closed, and all appointments scheduled for 2 March 2026, were cancelled. US citizens were urged to stay away from large gatherings.

== See also ==
- 1979 U.S. embassy burning in Islamabad
- 2012 Benghazi attack
- Anti-American sentiment in Pakistan
