= Inter-Services Intelligence activities in the United States =

Military intelligence program

- Part of Pakistan–United States relations
- Location: United States
- Objective: Operational
- Date: 1980s—Present

The Inter–Services Intelligence (abbreviated as ISI) has been alleged or previously documented by various authors of running an active military intelligence program in the United States, as well as operational activities related to America outside the country.

== 2000s ==
Some authors have alleged the ISI of supporting the 1999 release of Ahmed Omar Saeed Sheikh, who was subsequently convicted of the 2002 beheading of Wall Street Journal reporter Daniel Pearl.

The ISI has reportedly been suspicious about CIA's attempted penetration of Pakistani nuclear assets, and CIA's alleged intelligence gathering in the Pakistan's tribal areas along the Afghan border. Based on these suspicions, it was speculated that the ISI was pursuing counter-intelligence against CIA operations in Pakistan and Afghanistan. ISI former DG Ashfaq Parvez Kayani is also reported to have said, "real aim of U.S. [war] strategy is to denuclearize Pakistan."

== 2010s ==
According to a report by The New York Times, FBI officials tracking the activities of Pakistani spies in the United States have claimed that the ISI actively monitors the Pakistani American community. The objective is to extract information from Pakistanis living in the United States and to specifically keep a check on any elements that are openly critical of the Pakistani government. In one such incident, Mohammad Tasleem, an attaché posted at the Pakistan consulate in New York, had been identified as a clandestine ISI operative who had been posing as an FBI agent to collect information from members of the Pakistani community, in what was described as an ISI campaign to keep tabs on the Pakistani diaspora community. When the matter came to light following an FBI tip-off to Leon E. Panetta, the director of the CIA at that time, a "tense conversation" had reportedly taken place between the directors of the two intelligence agencies in April 2010. According to the report, "Within days, Mr. Tasleem was spirited out of the United States — a quiet resolution typical of the spy games among the worlds's powers".

U.S. diplomats in Pakistan have claimed being intimidated or harassed frequently. One American official described harassment occurring in the form of vehicles of American diplomats being constantly stopped and thoroughly checked by Pakistani security personnel, and pressure against the construction of American consulates. These actions particularly came into the limelight during the director-generalship of Ahmad Shuja Pasha, in his final year in the backdrop of the Osama bin Laden operation. Pasha reportedly adopted a hostile stance on Washington, cutting down the ISI's cooperation, jailing Shakil Afridi, the Pakistani informant who whistleblew Osama bin Laden's alleged presence to the CIA, "ordering the harassment of U.S. diplomats in Pakistan" among other things.

ISI allegedly blew the cover of the CIA station chief in Islamabad in 2010 by filing a lawsuit naming the CIA station chief Jonathan Banks. The lawsuit was filed by a drone victim who alleged that CIA was killing innocent civilians using its drone program. Following this Banks was recalled. In 2013, Pakistan Tehreek-e-Insaf a political party that also runs the government in the Pakistani North Western province Khyber Pakhtunkhwa lodged a complaint against CIA director John O. Brennan and Islamabad station chief Craig Osth for aiding in the drone attack at Hangu District on 21 November 2013.

ISI operative Mohammed Tasleem, an attache in the New York consulate, was found by the FBI in 2010 to be issuing threats against Pakistanis living in the United States, to prevent them from speaking openly about Pakistan's government. US officials and Pakistani journalists and scholars say the ISI has a systematic campaign to threaten those who speak critically of the Pakistan military.

Pakistani political academic Ayesha Siddiqa has controversially claimed that the ISI has infiltrated US think tanks. According to Siddiqa, a Pakistani diplomat had confided that the ISI set up funds to infiltrate think tanks in Washington, D.C. and had "finally did it".

Syed Ghulam Nabi Fai is a Kashmiri American activist who was charged for concealing transfer of USD 3.5 million from the Inter-Services Intelligence (ISI) to fund his lobbying efforts and influence the U.S. government on the Kashmir conflict in violation of the Foreign Agents Registration Act.

== See also ==
- CIA activities in Pakistan
- Soviet espionage in the United States
- Chinese intelligence operations in the United States
