= Anti-American sentiment in Pakistan =

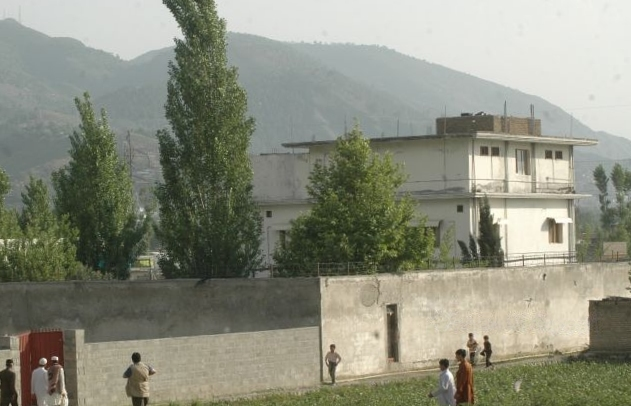
The raid on the compound of Osama bin Laden inflamed anti-American sentiments in Pakistan.

Anti-American sentiment in Pakistan has been evident through public demonstrations and burning of the flag of the United States. When measured in 2009 Pakistan was amongst the countries with the strongest such antipathy. According to Anatol Lieven, anti-American sentiment in Pakistan is characterised more by political hostilities rather than racial or religious undertones.

Reasons for unpopularity have included cultural issues and US foreign policy actions. Cultural grievances have been perceived affronts to Islam by US citizens. Unpopular foreign policy actions have included U.S. military actions on Pakistani soil such as drone attacks, the unilateral operation to kill Osama Bin Laden and the 2011 NATO attack in Pakistan, as well as CIA activities such as the Raymond Allen Davis incident, and the perceived inadequate US response to the humanitarian crisis of the 2010 Pakistan floods. The slogan "Death to America" is a common refrain among politicians and rallies in Pakistan.

For most of its history, Pakistan has had turbulent relations with the United States, leading to deep-rooted public antipathy. A 2014 Pew Research Center poll suggested that 59% of Pakistanis viewed the United States either very unfavorably or somewhat unfavorably, down from 80% in 2012. According to a Gallup survey, 72% of the population thinks the U.S. is an enemy and 80% of PTI supporters consider the same.

During the 2022 Pakistani constitutional crisis, PTI leader Imran Khan named the United States as the country in question over a 'threatening letter' and blames America for his downfall, according to a survey by Gallup Pakistan, most Pakistanis were 'angry' about the removal of Khan as prime minister, and close to a majority believe his claims that his downfall was due to an American 'regime change' campaign.

== Attacks on American consulates ==
Due to rise of Anti-American sentiment in Pakistan and Islamism started to become popular in Pakistan after Army Chief of Staff Muhammad Zia-ul-Haq overthrew and executed the secular Prime Minister Zulfikar Ali Bhutto in a 1977 coup d'état and began implementing Islamic law at the same time, Iran's Islamic Revolution and the victory of Mujahideen in Soviet-Afghan war caused major influence and impact on the Islamization of Pakistan, Since then there have been a series of attacks by Islamist mobs, rioters, violent protesters and militant groups on the American consulates in the country like 1979 U.S. embassy burning in Islamabad and Attacks on U.S consulate in Karachi notably 2026 attack on the United States consulate in Karachi during the 2026 Iran war. The US consulate has been described as a tempting target for terrorism.

== See also ==
- Anti-Americanism
- 1979 U.S. embassy burning in Islamabad
- 2011 NATO attack in Pakistan
- Lettergate
- How the World Sees America
- Pakistan–United States military relations
