= Embassy of the United States, Islamabad =

Diplomatic mission of the United States in Pakistan

Embassy of the United States in Islamabad اسلام آباد میں امریکہ کا سفارت خانہ
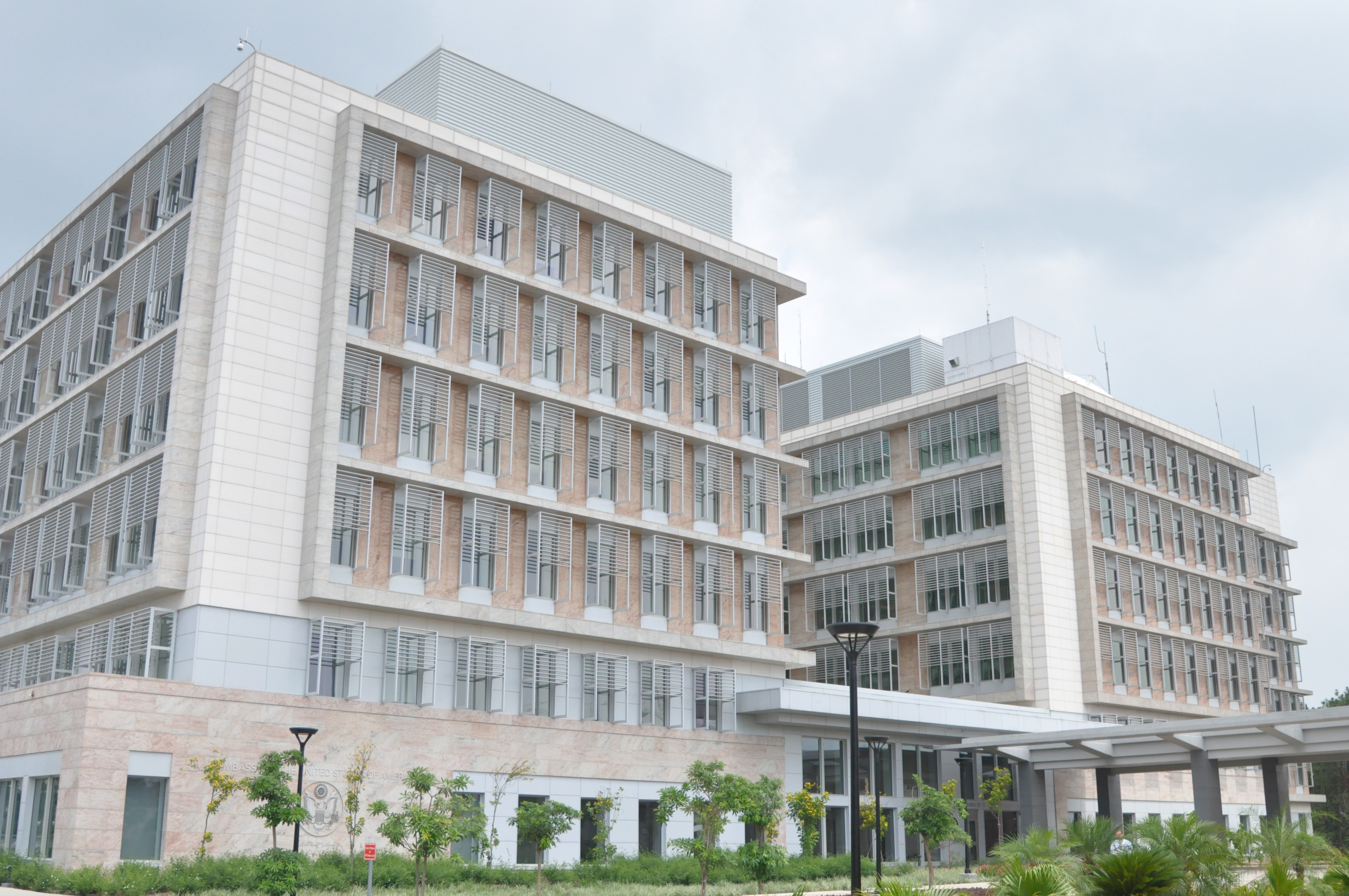
- Location: Ramna 5, Diplomatic Enclave, Islamabad, Islamabad Capital Territory 44000
- Coordinates: 33.725°N 73.117°E
- Jurisdiction: Pakistan
- Chargé d'affaires: Donald Blome
- Website: U.S. Embassy in Islamabad

The Embassy of the United States in Islamabad is the diplomatic mission of the United States in Pakistan at Ramna 5, Diplomatic Enclave, Islamabad, 44000. The embassy in Islamabad is one of the largest U.S. embassies in the world, in terms of personnel, and houses a chancery and complex of office buildings. The embassy complex also houses a contingent of military officials and intelligence personnel in addition to diplomatic and non-diplomatic staff. U.S. Department of State also maintains Consulates in Karachi, Lahore and Peshawar.

The American diplomatic mission is headed by Ambassador Donald Blome. The first Embassy of the United States to Pakistan was located in the city of Karachi, then the capital of Pakistan. The embassy was relocated to Islamabad after the city was made the new capital in 1960, and rebuilt after being burned down in 1979 by Jamaat-e-Islami agitators. In 2015, a new embassy complex was completed at a cost of $736 million.

== History ==
The first U.S. embassy in Pakistan was established on August 15, 1947, in Karachi, then-capital of Pakistan. When the capital was moved to Islamabad in 1960, a new embassy was constructed there.

=== 1979 ===
After being burned to the ground by Jamaat-e-Islami extremists in 1979 following rumours of American involvement in the Grand Mosque seizure, security at the rebuilt embassy was heightened.

=== Post 9/11 ===
Security was again significantly increased in the wake of the September 11 attacks in 2001.

=== 2011 ===
In 2011, the new complex began construction.

=== 2013 ===
On 9 August 2013, the U.S. State Department evacuated most diplomats and all non-emergency staff from the consulate in Lahore, and U.S. citizens were warned not to travel there due to terror concerns.

=== 2015 ===
In August 2015, a new embassy complex was inaugurated in the Diplomatic Enclave which would house the embassy, replacing the previous building. The complex was built at a cost of $736 million, with $85 million invested into the local economy by the purchase of construction supplies from Pakistani contractors and suppliers. The embassy is reported to be the second-most expensive U.S. diplomatic mission, after the U.S. embassy in Baghdad. The embassy was designed to accommodate a staff of 2,500 people.

=== 2025 ===
On 9 October 2025, the Islamist political party Tehreek-e-Labbaik Pakistan (TLP) launched a protest march from Lahore and Faisalabad toward Islamabad under the banner of the Labbaik Ya Aqsa Million March. The movement called for a rally outside the US Embassy in Islamabad in solidarity with the Palestinians amid the ongoing Gaza genocide. The planned march triggered a major security response: authorities imposed Section 144 in Rawalpindi to restrict public gatherings, suspended 3G/4G mobile data services in Islamabad and Rawalpindi, and placed shipping containers alongside a heavy police deployment to seal off the Red Zone around the capital. Clashes erupted in Lahore when Punjab Police raided the TLP headquarters on Multan Road to arrest party leader Saad Rizvi. Police used tear gas and live fire to disperse demonstrators. According to reports, at least 11 TLP workers were killed and dozens more were injured during the live fire and shelling by the police. The government maintained that the TLP had not obtained the required permission for the march, attributing the unrest to internal party disputes. Pakistan Tehreek-e-Insaf member Sheikh Waqas Akram has compared the incident to Model Town Massacre and has said the government could not carry out a transparent probe into the massacre, hence independent observers and human rights organisations must be included to ensure a fair investigation.

=== 2026 ===
Nationwide protests erupted in Pakistan on 1 March 2026, primarily among Shia Muslim communities, in response to the killing of Ayatollah Ali Khamenei in joint US-Israeli strikes. Protestors accused the Pakistani government of siding with the US during the conflict. The protests in Islamabad led authorities to block roads to the Red Zone and increase security around the US Embassy. Amid calls for demonstrations, at least 3 protesters were killed near the embassy.

== Gallery ==
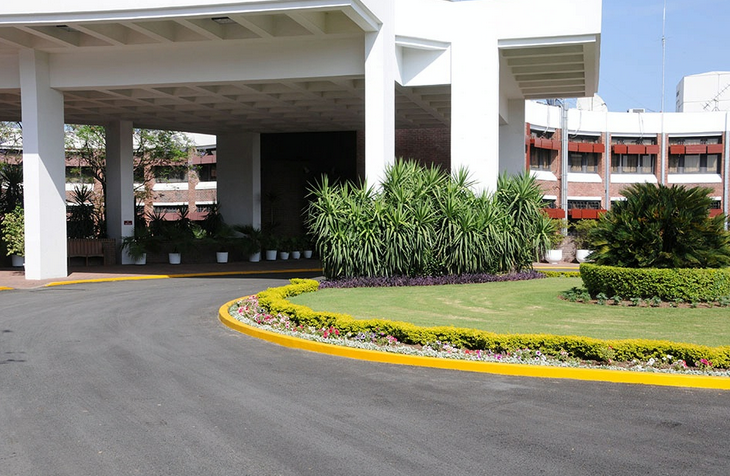
Former Chancery of the embassy

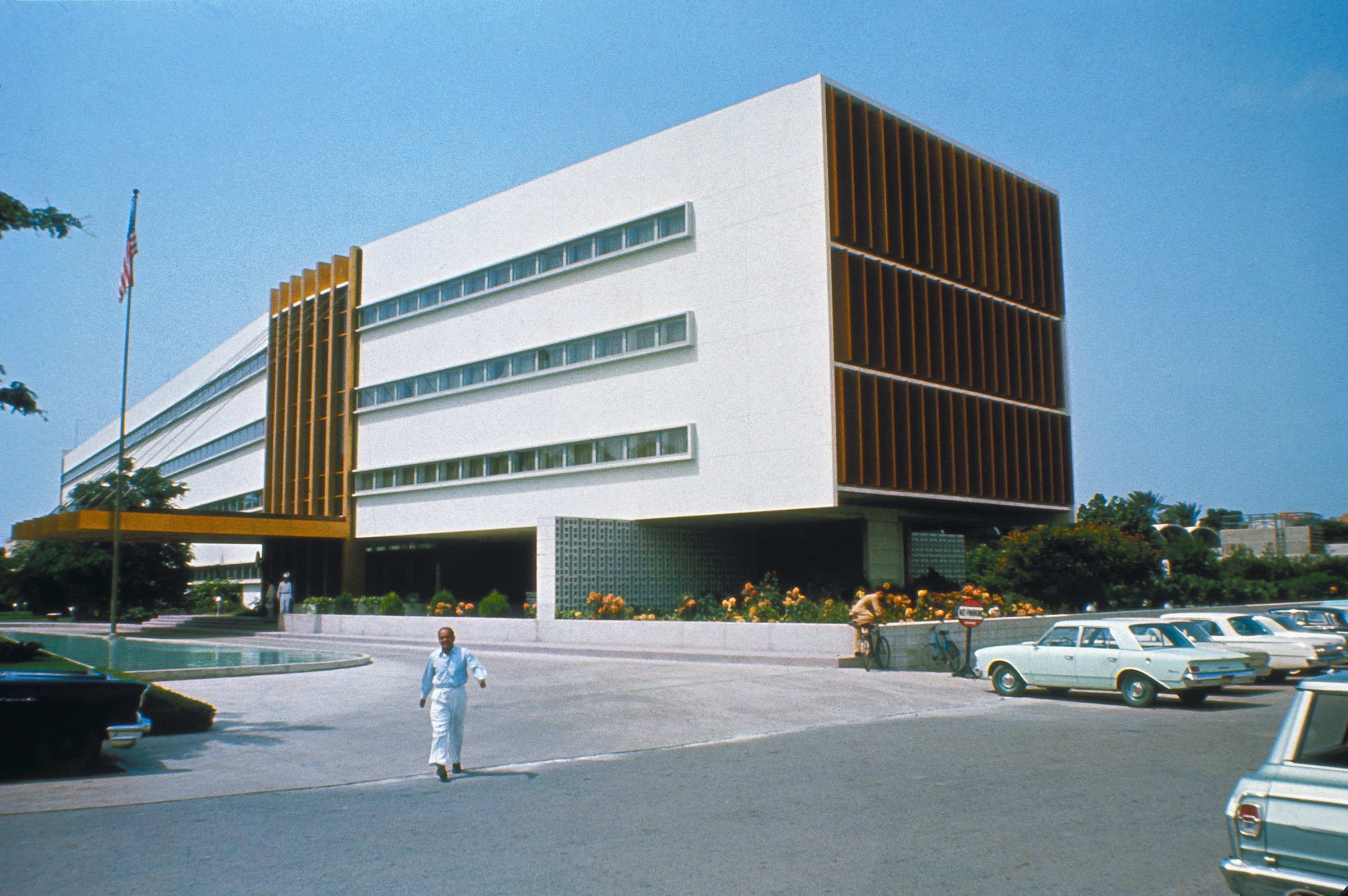
A view of the former U.S. Embassy and Consulate in Karachi, Pakistan (photograph from 1979).

== See also ==
- Americans in Pakistan
- 1979 U.S. embassy burning in Islamabad
- 2025 Tehreek-e-Labbaik Pakistan protests
- Attacks on U.S consulate in Karachi
- April 2010 U.S consulate and ANP attack
- Pakistan–United States relations
- Pakistan–United States military relations
