= CIA transnational health and economic activities =

The U.S. Central Intelligence Agency deals with activities related to human survival issues, emphasizing disease and basic needs such as water and agriculture as a part of its function across the world.

== Assessments and reports ==
CIA activities in this area include the preparation of assessments and reports. These papers examine the most lethal diseases globally and by region; develops alternative scenarios about their future course; examines national and international capacities to deal with them; and assesses their national and global social, economic, political, and security impact. Some papers also assess the infectious disease threat from international sources to the United States; to U.S. military personnel overseas; and to regions in which the United States has or may develop significant equities.

The CIA also participates in the production of intelligence community assessments and reports. The National Intelligence Estimate on the Global Infectious Disease Threat, the assessment on The Next Wave of HIV/AIDS, and the assessment on SARS are all joint intelligence-community products and are not products based solely on the work of CIA analysts. These assessments are summarized on the National Intelligence Assessments on Infectious Diseases page.

== Using public aid for information ==
Some of the humanitarian efforts by the CIA have been accused of being false, or merely as a means to get information using the aid workers. A CIA polio vaccination program in Abbottabad, Pakistan came under fire in 2011 after it was revealed the CIA used the program to get information about Osama bin Laden.

Shakil Afridi, the man who helped the CIA orchestrate the campaign, was sentenced to jail by Pakistani officials. A number of relief workers were also killed while trying to hand out polio vaccines after mistrust about the workers being CIA spies grew.

This caused a weakening in U.S/Pakistan relations and set the campaign to eradicate polio back since the vaccinations were never completed. Congress also cut aid to Pakistan 58 percent in the following year.

== Using intelligence for humanitarian aid ==
The CIA has used the intelligence it has gathered to help countries with natural disasters. On their website, the CIA writes: "To support global and humanitarian issues, INR worked with the rest of the IC on imagery support in response to natural disasters, such as forest fires in Southeast Asia, hurricanes, and earthquakes. Declassified U-2 imagery helped regional planners in Latin America during the clean-up from Hurricane Mitch."

They are also credited with helping earthquake relief efforts. The CIA display on their website that: "CIA supported USAID's humanitarian relief efforts following the earthquakes in Turkey and Taiwan by quickly assembling map packages of the affected regions and, in each case, delivering the packages to a representative of USAID's Office of Foreign Disaster literally on their way to the airport for an outbound flight.
