= 2010 North-West Frontier Province attacks =

Suicide bombings in Pakistan

5 April 2010 Peshawar bombings
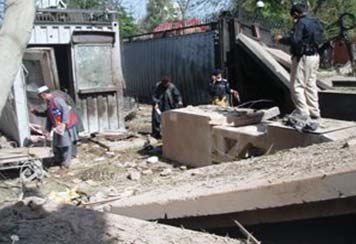
- The northwest gate of the Peshawar consulate after the bombings
- Location: Peshawar, Pakistan
- Date: April 5, 2010
- Target: U.S. Consulate in Peshawar and ANP rally
- Attack type: Suicide attack
- Deaths: 50
- Injuries: 100
- Perpetrator: Tehreek-e-Taliban Pakistan

On April 5, 2010, two bombings in Pakistan killed up to 50 people and injured 100 more. In the first attack the U.S. Consulate in Peshawar was attacked by militants. The coordinated attack involved a vehicle suicide bomb and attackers who tried to enter the U.S. Consulate in Peshawar by using grenades and weapons fire. Three explosions went off within a span of 15 minutes in the area of Saddar and Hayatabad Avenue, near the American consulate and the Peshawar headquarters of Pakistan's intelligence agency. Several militants came in two vehicles. The first vehicle exploded near a security checkpoint, and gunmen in the second car opened fire. A Tehrik-i-Taliban Pakistan spokesman claimed responsibility for the assault on the consulate. In Timergara, Lower Dir district an Awami National Party rally came under attack. Pakistani Taliban spokesman Azam Tariq said "Americans are our enemies. We carried out the attack on their consulate in Peshawar. We plan more such attacks."

== Preceding events ==
A suicide attack at a political rally in Timergarah preceded the Peshawar Bombings. The suicide attacker detonated a bomb near the stage built for the organised celebrations. At least 46 people were killed.

== Attacks ==
The American consulate attack killed 8 people including 2 security service personnel. However, no Americans were hurt in the attack. The perpetrators were armed with guns and grenades and two car bombs. The security barrier was damaged, while shells from rocket-propelled grenades and hand grenades were seen in the vicinity. Police said one of the car bombs exploded at a checkpoint 50 metres from the consulate, while the other 100 kg bomb went off close to the consulate gate. At least three blasts were reported before a firefight between security forces and the attackers followed. According to Pakistan police official Ghulam Hussain, "The target was certainly the American consulate but they didn't succeed in getting there...one of the suicide bombers blew himself up close to the gate. Police guarding the US consulate started retaliatory fire. More blasts took place. We have recovered unexploded material from four different points". The US Consulate General said two Pakistani security guards employed by the Consulate General were among those killed in the attack.

Hours earlier 44 people died in a suicide attack at a rally in the north-western town of Timergara, Lower Dir District, during a meeting of the Awami National Party (ANP), the ruling coalition in North West Frontier Province. Zahid Khan, an Awami National Party spokesperson, said his party were celebrating plans to change the name of the North West Frontier Province when a suspected suicide bomber detonated his explosives. An official of the ruling ANP party, Hashim Khan Babar, told the media the attacks appeared to be in response to a major security operation which was launched in the Orakzai tribal region near Peshawar last week.

== Perpetrators ==
Tehreek-e-Taliban Pakistan claimed responsibility for the attacks in an announcement by telephone from their spokesman Azam Tariq, with the statement "We accept the attacks on the American consulate. This is revenge for drone attacks. We have already told you that we have 2,800 to 3,000 fedayeen (suicide bombers). We will carry out more such attacks. We will target any place where there are Americans" The attack was revenge for Drone attacks in Pakistan.

A BBC analyst said the Pakistani Taliban were apparently aiming for a feat to match the one last December in Khost, Afghanistan, in which several American CIA officials were killed.

== Repercussions ==
An analyst in the capital said that after the government war on the Taliban the militants spread into more settled areas. He added that "The American consulate is one of the most well-guarded places in Peshawar. It [the attack] was well planned and they very confidently hit their target." Al Jazeera's correspondent also noted that "Although they have been driven out of their strongholds in key areas, there is a feeling that a substantial number of those people have now infiltrated into the settled areas. There is trouble in the southern parts of the Punjab - so you do see some sort of regrouping attempt and a fear that there maybe [sic] an escalation of this sort of violence."

== Reactions ==
The United States embassy in Pakistan released a statement condemning the attack and saying that it reflected the "terrorists' desperation". Robert Gibbs, the White House spokesmen, added: "We strongly condemn the violence and the actions. And I would point out that ... extremists in Pakistan have succeeded in killing Pakistanis, which I think hardens the view that has led to gains that have been made over the course of the year against extremism by native Pakistanis."

== See also ==
- List of terrorist incidents in Pakistan since 2001
- 2002 US consulate bombing in Karachi
- Attacks on the United States
