= Americans in Pakistan =

Ethnic group in Pakistan

Total population
- 52,486 (2015)

Regions with significant populations
- Karachi · Lahore · Islamabad · Peshawar

Languages
- American English · Urdu · Punjabi and Spanish

Religion
- Protestantism · Roman Catholicism · Islam

Related ethnic groups
- Americans

Americans in Pakistan (Urdu: امریکی ) form a sizeable expatriate community. According to Pakistan's Ministry of Interior, there were 52,486 Americans residing in Pakistan in 2015. Some of them are Pakistani Americans who have returned to Pakistan. Many Pakistani Americans returned during the unstable conditions post-September 11 attacks and the Great Recession.

According to early statistics of 1999 based on registrations with the local American embassy and consulates, there were over 4,200 Americans in the country, with 2,100 in Pakistan's financial capital Karachi, about 1,250 in Lahore, 506 in Islamabad and 375 in Peshawar.

== Employment and social life ==
The United States also maintains a large diplomatic and military contingent in the country; media reports claim that as of 2009, in addition to 275 diplomats, there are more than a thousand US Marines providing security to diplomatic personnel, and hundreds more unregistered officials living in private houses. This represents significant growth compared to 1999, when the American diplomatic contingent in the country barely exceeded one hundred people. However, Pakistani officials deny the reports of more than a thousand US Marines in the country.

For the American community in Karachi, the American Club once was the centre of their social life. There is also an American School of Karachi, but as of 2013 it had only a handful of American students and teachers.

In late 2009, Pakistan held up many visas for U.S. diplomats, military service members and others, because of hostility inside Pakistan toward the expansion of U.S. operations in the country, while many suspected Americans living in Pakistan were detained following five American terrorists linked to Al-Qaeda arrested in Sargodha.

== Relations with Pakistani society ==
In 1997, four American oil workers and their driver were shot by multiple gunmen while they sat in their car on a crowded street. Two men, both members of the Muttahida Qaumi Movement, were sentenced to death in 1999 for the shootings.

In 2002, there were further terrorist attacks against Americans and expatriates of other nationalities, including a bombing at the US consulate.

In 2003, the American actor Erik Audé was arrested and imprisoned for seven years in Pakistan on charges of drug trafficking. In the same year, The New York Times named Karachi "one of the most dangerous spots on the planet for an American".

In November 2008, foreign aid worker Stephen Vance was ambushed and killed on his way to work in Peshawar.

Pakistani newspapers claim that American diplomats in Pakistan carried automatic weapons without a license, attacked local citizens, and cursed at local policemen. They have also allegedly dodged law enforcement personnel and security screenings on motorways, airports and elsewhere on multiple occasions.

In January 2011, an American national and CIA contractor Raymond Davis was involved in a shootout that killed three Pakistanis in Lahore, resulting in a diplomatic rift between Pakistan and the United States. Davis was later freed by the Pakistani government and the families of the victims were paid compensation, in spite of large public opposition to his acquittal.

In February 2011, American citizen Aaron Mark DeHaven was arrested in Peshawar after he was found allegedly overstaying his visa illegally. He was later deported.

In May 2011, an American national Mathew Greg Bennett was tailed and arrested by law enforcement agencies in Rawalpindi on claims of involvement in suspicious activities.

In June 2011, an American citizen living in Pakistan with his Pakistani wife and family, Mathew Craig Barret, was arrested in Islamabad. Barret was suspected to be spying on the country's nuclear facilities and was blacklisted by the interior ministry after he had dodged an earlier arrest allegedly after being found doing "suspicious activities." Following a police raid on his house, he was placed in lock-up, and was to be deported and prevented from entering the country.

On 12 June 2011, yet another American national was arrested, this time in Sukkur; David Sat, who was working for an NGO, was detained by authorities after he was found to have overstayed his visa by two months. A case was registered against him. Pakistani security and defence expert Shireen Mazari, who is also known for being a vocal critic of American policies, once had a verbal brawl in an Islamabad restaurant with an American man whom she later referred to as a "bloody CIA agent"; Mazari said that suspicious looking Americans are prevalent in large numbers in Islamabad, operating under the cover of diplomacy, and that they are "running loose in Islamabad intimidating whomever they choose."

Pakistan has blacklisted many American non-governmental organizations and media personalities and denied visas to US nationals.

In 2011, after continuous scrutiny and following the death of Osama bin Laden in his compound in Abbottabad which caused a diplomatic controversy between Pakistan and the United States, the Pakistani government and the military establishment ordered the reduction of the number of American personnel present in Pakistan. Consequently, many American security personnel were dumped and forced to leave the country.

In 2015, an American medical professor was shot and injured in Karachi.

== Education ==
American international schools in Pakistan include:

- International School of Islamabad
- Karachi American School
- Lahore American School

== See also ==
- Anti-American sentiment in Pakistan
- 2010 CIA Station Chief removal in Pakistan
- Pakistani American
- Canadians in Pakistan
- Pakistan–United States relations
