= National Intelligence Assessments on Infectious Diseases =

The United States Intelligence Community (IC) has a long history of producing assessments on infectious diseases. Most of these papers are distributed to government administrators and inform the choices of policymakers. Three of these assessments stand out as analytical products that have had important impact on the awareness, funding and treatment of infectious diseases around the world. The first paper is the National Intelligence Estimate on the Global Infectious Disease Threat, the second paper is the assessment on the Next Wave of HIV/AIDS, and the third paper was the assessment on SARS. This page summarizes the findings of these three papers and provides information about their impact.

== National Intelligence Estimate on the Global Infectious Disease Threat ==
In January, 2000, The National Intelligence Council released its National Intelligence Estimate on the Global Infectious Disease Threat. This paper examined the re-emergence of the threat from infectious diseases worldwide and its implications for the United States.

It stated that infectious diseases were a leading cause of death, accounting for a quarter to a third of the estimated 54 million deaths worldwide in 1998, and that the spread of infectious diseases results as much from changes in human behavior—including lifestyles and land use patterns, increased trade and travel, and inappropriate use of antibiotic drugs—as from mutations in pathogens.

Additionally, the paper found that new and reemerging infectious diseases will pose a rising global health threat and will complicate US and global security over the next 20 years. These diseases will endanger US citizens at home and abroad, threaten US armed forces deployed overseas, and exacerbate social and political instability in key countries and regions in which the United States has significant interests.

- Twenty well-known diseases—including tuberculosis (TB), malaria, and cholera—have reemerged or spread geographically since 1973, often in more virulent and drug-resistant forms.
- At least 30 previously unknown disease agents have been identified since 1973, including human immunodeficiency virus (HIV), Ebola, hepatitis C, and Nipah virus, for which no cures are available.
- Of the seven biggest killers worldwide, TB, malaria, hepatitis, and, in particular, HIV/AIDS continue to surge, with HIV/AIDS and TB likely to account for the overwhelming majority of deaths from infectious diseases in developing countries by 2020.
- Acute lower respiratory infections—including pneumonia and influenza—as well as diarrheal diseases and measles, appear to have peaked at high incidence levels.

=== Regional trends ===
Developing countries will continue to experience the greatest impact from infectious diseases—because of malnutrition, poor sanitation, poor water quality, and inadequate health care—but developed countries also will be affected.

==== Impact within the United States ====
Although the infectious disease threat in the United States remains relatively modest as compared to that of noninfectious diseases, the trend is up. Annual infectious disease-related death rates in the United States have nearly doubled to some 170,000 annually after reaching an historic low in 1980. Many infectious diseases—most recently, the West Nile virus—originate outside U.S. borders and are introduced by international travelers, immigrants, returning U.S. military personnel, or imported animals and foodstuffs. In the opinion of the U.S. Institute of Medicine, the next major infectious disease threat to the United States may be, like HIV, a previously unrecognized pathogen. Barring that, the most dangerous known infectious diseases likely to threaten the United States over the next two decades will be HIV/AIDS, hepatitis C, tuberculosis, and new, more lethal variants of influenza. Hospital-acquired infections and foodborne illnesses also will pose a threat.

- Some 4 million Americans are chronic carriers of the hepatitis C virus, a significant cause of liver cancer and cirrhosis. The U.S. death toll from the virus may surpass that of HIV/AIDS in the next five years.
- TB, exacerbated by multidrug resistant strains and HIV/AIDS co-infection, has made a comeback. Although a massive and costly control effort is achieving considerable success, the threat will be sustained by the spread of HIV and the growing number of new, particularly illegal, immigrants infected with TB.
- Influenza now kills some 30,000 Americans annually, and epidemiologists generally agree that it is not a question of whether, but when, the next killer pandemic will occur.
- Highly virulent and increasingly antimicrobial resistant pathogens, such as Staphylococcus aureus, are major sources of hospital-acquired infections that kill some 14,000 patients annually.
- The doubling of U.S. food imports over the last five years is one of the factors contributing to tens of millions of foodborne illnesses and 9,000 deaths that occur annually, and the trend is up.

==== Sub-Saharan Africa ====
65% of all deaths in Sub-Saharan Africa come from infectious diseases. Rudimentary health care delivery and response systems, the unavailability or misuse of drugs, the lack of funds, and the multiplicity of conflicts are exacerbating the crisis. Investment in health care in the region is minimal, less than 40 percent of the people in countries such as Nigeria and the Democratic Republic of the Congo (DRC) have access to basic medical care, and even in relatively well off South Africa, only 50–70% have such access, with black populations at the low end of the spectrum. It will remain the most vulnerable region. The death rates for many diseases, including HIV/AIDS and malaria, exceed those in all other regions. Sub-Saharan Africa's health care capacity—the poorest in the world—will continue to lag.

Sub-Saharan Africa also has an estimated 90 percent of the global malaria burden. Cholera, dysentery, and other diarrheal diseases also are major killers in the region, particularly among children, refugees, and internally displaced populations. Forty percent of all childhood deaths from diarrheal diseases occur in Sub-Saharan Africa. The region also has a high rate of hepatitis B and C infections and is the only region with a perennial meningococcal meningitis problem in a "meningitis belt" stretching from west to east. Sub-Saharan Africa also has yellow fever, while trypanosomiasis or "sleeping sickness" is making a comeback in the DROC and Sudan, and the Marburg virus also appeared in DRC for the first time in 1998. Ebola hemorrhagic fever strikes sporadically in countries such as the DRC, Gabon, Côte d'Ivoire, and Sudan.

==== Asia and the Pacific ====
Multidrug resistant TB, malaria, and cholera are rampant in this area. The spread of HIV/AIDS, with its immunosuppression, will lead to a dramatic increase in infectious disease deaths. By 2010, the region could surpass Africa in the number of HIV infections.

Although the more developed countries of Asia and the Pacific, such as Japan, South Korea, Australia, and New Zealand, have strong records in combating infectious diseases, infectious disease prevalence in South and Southeast Asia is almost as high as in Sub-Saharan Africa. The health care delivery system of the Asia and Pacific region—the majority of which is privately financed—is particularly vulnerable to economic downturns even though this is offset to some degree by much of the region's reliance on traditional medicine from local practitioners. In South and Southeast Asia, reemergent diseases such as TB, malaria, cholera, and dengue fever are rampant, while HIV/AIDS, after a late start, is growing faster than in any other region.

TB caused 1 million deaths in the Asia and Pacific region in 1998, more than any other single disease, with India and China accounting for two-thirds of the total. Several million new cases occur annually—most in India, China and Indonesia—representing as much as 40 percent of the global TB burden. HIV/AIDS is increasing dramatically, especially in India, which leads the world in absolute numbers of HIV/AIDS infections, estimated at 3–5 million. China is better off than most of the countries to its south, but it too has a growing AIDS problem, with HIV infections variously estimated at 100,000 to 4000,000. and spreading rapidly. Regionwide, the number of people infected with HIV could overtake Sub-Saharan Africa in absolute numbers before 2010.

==== Former Soviet Union (FSU) and Eastern Europe ====
These areas will see a substantial increase in infectious disease incidence and deaths. In the FSU especially, the steep deterioration in health care and other services owing to economic decline has led to a sharp rise in diphtheria, dysentery, cholera, and hepatitis B and C. TB has reached epidemic proportions throughout the FSU, while the HIV-infected population in Russia alone could exceed 1 million by the end of 2000 and double yet again by 2002. The sharp decline in health care infrastructure in Russia and elsewhere in the former Soviet Union (FSU) and, to a lesser extent, in Eastern Europe—owing to economic difficulties—is causing a dramatic rise in infectious disease incidence. Death rates attributed to infectious diseases in the FSU increased 50% from 1990 to 1996, with TB accounting for a substantial number of such deaths. Access to health care ranges from 50 to 70% in most European FSU states, including Russia and Ukraine, and from 40 to 50% in FSU states located in Central Asia. WHO estimates are consistent, that only 50–80% of FSU citizens had regular access to essential drugs in 1997, as compared to more than 95% a decade earlier as health care budgets and government-provided health services were slashed. Health care access is better in Eastern Europe, particularly in more developed states such as Poland, the Czech Republic, and Hungary, where it ranges from 70 to 90%, while only 50-70% have access in countries such as Bulgaria and Romania. More than 95 percent of the population throughout the East European region had such access in 1987, according to WHO.

Crowded living conditions are among the causes fueling a TB epidemic in the FSU, especially among prison populations—while surging intravenous drug abuse (IVDA) and rampant prostitution are substantially responsible for a marked increase in HIV/AIDS incidence. There were 111,000 new TB infections and 25,000 deaths in Russia alone in 1996, a growing number of them multidrug resistant. The number of new infections for the entire FSU in 1996 was 188,000, while East European cases totaled 54,000.

Diphtheria reached epidemic proportions in the FSU in the first half of the decade, owing to lapses in vaccination. Cholera and dysentery outbreaks are occurring with increasing frequency in Russian cities, such as St. Petersburg and Moscow, and elsewhere in the FSU, such as in Tbilisi, owing to deteriorating water treatment and sewerage systems. Hepatitis B and C, spread primarily by IVDA and blood transfusions, are on the rise, especially in the non-European part of the FSU. Polio also has reappeared owing to interruptions in vaccination, with 140 new cases in Russia in 1995.

==== Latin America ====
There is distinct progress in infectious disease control in this region, including the eradication of polio, but uneven economic development has contributed to widespread resurgence of cholera, malaria, TB, and dengue. These diseases will continue to take a heavy toll in tropical and poorer countries.

Latin American countries are making considerable progress in infectious disease control, including the eradication of polio and major reductions in the incidence and death rates of measles, neonatal tetanus, some diarrheal diseases, and acute respiratory infections. Nonetheless, infectious diseases are still a major cause of illness and death in the region, and the risk of new and reemerging diseases remains substantial. Widening income disparities, periodic economic shocks, and rampant urbanization have disrupted disease control efforts and contributed to widespread reemergence of cholera, malaria, TB, and dengue, especially in the poorer Central American and Caribbean countries and in the Amazon basin of South America. According to the AFMIC typology, Latin America's health care capacity is substantially more advanced than that of Sub-Saharan Africa and somewhat better than mainland Asia's, with 70–90% of populations having access to basic health care in Chile, Costa Rica, and Cuba on the upper end of the scale. Less than 50 percent have such access in Haiti, most of Central America, and the Amazon basin countries, including the rural populations in Brazil.

Cholera reemerged with a vengeance in the region in 1991 for the first time in a century with 400,000 new cases, and while dropping to 100,000 cases in 1997, it still comprises two-thirds of the global cholera burden. TB is a growing problem regionwide, especially in Brazil, Peru, Argentina, and the Dominican Republic where drug-resistant cases also are on the rise. Haiti does not provide data but probably also has a high infection rate. HIV/AIDS also is spreading rapidly, placing Latin America third behind Sub-Saharan Africa and Asia in HIV prevalence. Prevalence is high in Brazil and especially in the Caribbean countries (except Cuba), where 2 percent of the population is infected. Malaria is prevalent in the Amazon basin. Dengue reemerged in the region in 1976, presenting both as the usual form and the more lethal dengue hemorrhagic fever (DHF). Hepatitis B and C prevalence is greatest in the Amazon basin, Bolivia, and Central America, while DHF is particularly prevalent in Brazil, Colombia, and Venezuela. Yellow fever has made a comeback over the last decade throughout the Amazon basin, and there have been several recent outbreaks of gastrointestinal disease attributed to E. coli infection in Chile, Argentina, Bolivia and Peru Hemorrhagic fevers are present in almost all South American countries, and most hantavirus pulmonary syndrome occurs in the southern cone.

==== The Middle East and North Africa region ====
has substantial TB and hepatitis B and C prevalence, but conservative social mores, climatic factors, and the high level of health spending in the oil-producing states tend to limit some globally prevalent diseases, such as HIV/AIDS and malaria. The region has the lowest HIV infection rate among all regions, although this is probably due in part to above-average underreporting because of the stigma associated with the disease in Muslim societies.

The region's conservative social mores, climatic factors, and high levels of health spending in oil-producing states tend to limit some globally prevalent diseases, such as HIV/AIDS and malaria, but others, such as TB and hepatitis B and C, are more prevalent. The region's advantages are partially offset by the impact of war-related uprooting of populations, overcrowded cities with poor refrigeration and sanitation systems, and a dearth of water, especially clean drinking water. Health care capacity varies considerably within the region, according to the AFMIC typology. Israel and the Arabian Peninsula states minus Yemen are in far better shape than Iraq, Iran, Syria, and most of North Africa. Ninety to 100 percent of the Israeli population and 70 to 90 percent of the Saudi population have good access to health care. Elsewhere, access ranges from less than 40 percent in Yemen to 50 to 70 percent in the smaller Gulf states, Jordan and Tunisia, while most North African states fall into the 40- to-50-percent category.

==== Western Europe ====
Threats from several infectious diseases, include both those transmitted by humans, such as HIV/AIDS, TB, and hepatitis B and C, as well as from several economically costly zoonotic diseases (that is, those transmitted from animals to humans). The region's large volume of travel, trade, and immigration increases the risks of importing diseases from other regions, but its highly developed health care systems will limit their impact.

Its status as a hub of international travel, commerce, and immigration, moreover, dramatically increases the risks of importing new diseases from other regions. Tens of millions of West Europeans travel to developing countries annually, increasing the prospects for the importation of dangerous diseases, as demonstrated by the importation of typhoid in 1999. Some 88 percent of the regional population growth in the first half of the decade was due to immigration; legal immigrants now comprise about 6 percent of the population, and illegal newcomers number an estimated 6 million. Nonetheless, the region's highly developed health care infrastructure and delivery system tend to limit the incidence and especially the death rates of most infectious diseases, though not the economic costs. Access to high-quality care is available throughout most of the region, although governments are beginning to limit some heretofore generous health benefits, and a growing antivaccination movement in parts of Western Europe, such as Germany, is causing a rise in measles and other vaccine-preventable diseases. The AFMIC typology gives somewhat higher marks to northern over some southern European countries, but the region as a whole is ranked in the highest category, along with North America.

TB, especially its multidrug resistant strains, is on the upswing, as is co-infection with HIV, particularly in the larger countries, with some 50,000 TB cases reported in 1996. Hepatitis C prevalence is growing, especially in southern Europe. Western Europe also continues to have several zoonotic diseases, among which is the deadly new variant Creutzfeldt–Jakob disease (nvCJD), linked to the bovine spongiform encephalopathy or "mad cow disease" outbreak in the United Kingdom in 1995 that has since ebbed following implementation of strict control measures. Other recent disease concerns include meningococcal meningitis outbreaks in the Benelux countries and leishmaniasis-HIV co-infection, especially in southern Europe.

=== Response capacity ===
Development of an effective global surveillance and response system probably is at least a decade or more away, owing to inadequate coordination and funding at the international level and lack of capacity, funds, and commitment in many developing and former communist states. Although overall global health care capacity has improved substantially in recent decades, the gap between rich and poorer countries in the availability and quality of health care.

In most poorer countries, health care—ranging from basic pharmaceuticals and postnatal care to costly multidrug therapies—remains very limited. Market forces drive private pharmaceutical companies, and many developed country government research programs, to focus on drugs needed in their environment, not necessarily those of the poorer countries. This is generating a growing controversy between rich and poorer nations over such issues as intellectual property rights, as some developing countries make their own copies, not always with permission, of drugs under patent protection. Developing countries also are less willing to make microbial samples available to companies that will make commercial vaccines from them, which may be too costly for the country that provided the sample.

A global composite measure of health care infrastructure devised by DIA's Armed Forces Medical Intelligence Center (AFMIC) assesses factors such as the priority attributed to health care, health expenditures, the quality of health care delivery and access to drugs, and the extent of surveillance and response systems.

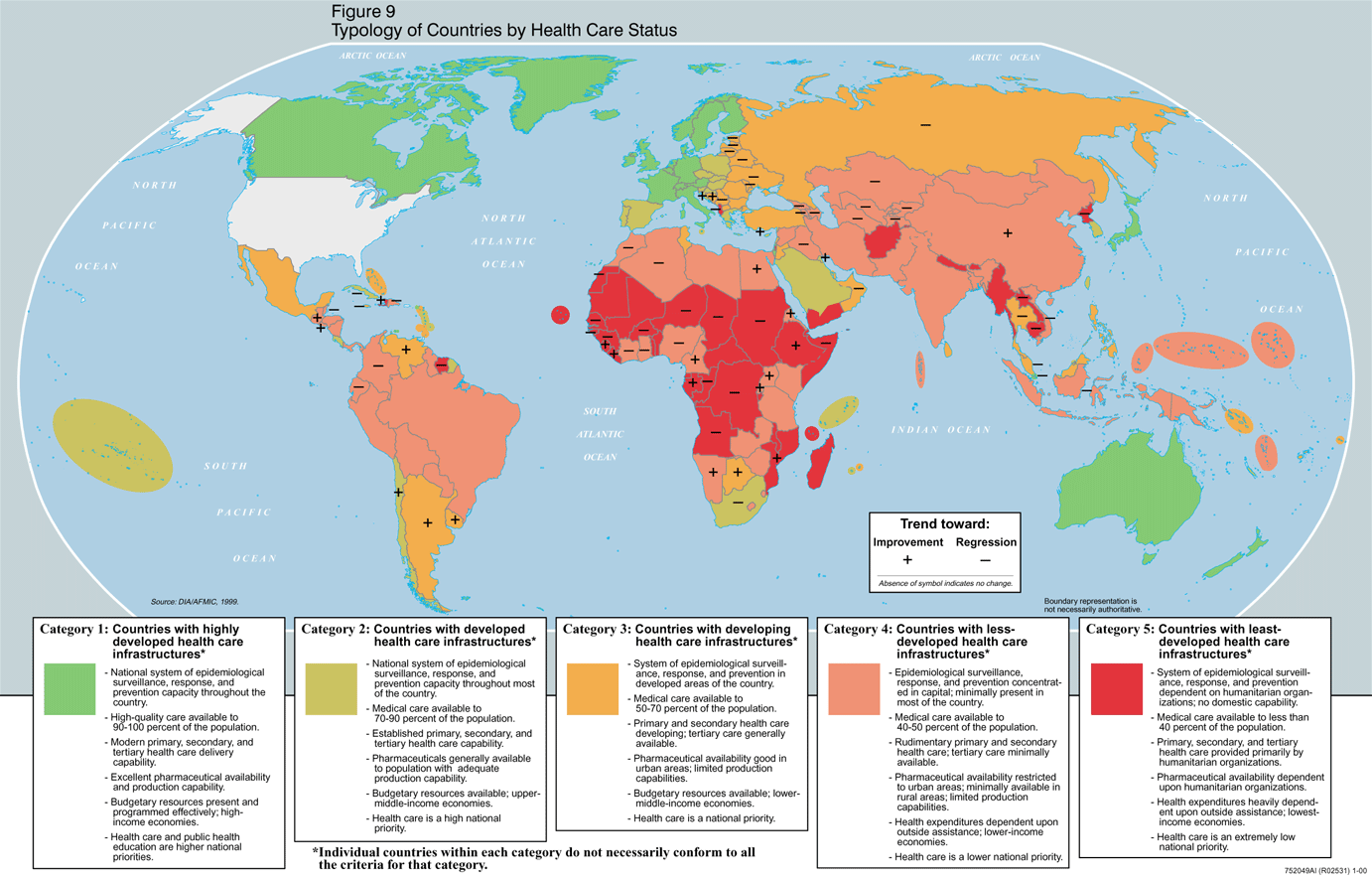
Typology of Worldwide Medical Care Capacity (1999)

A major obstacle to effective global surveillance and control of infectious diseases will continue to be the quality of national health statistical reporting by many developing countries and lack of followthrough to properly direct aid and to follow recommended health care practices. Those areas of the world most susceptible to infectious disease problems are least able to develop and maintain the sophisticated and costly communications equipment needed for effective disease surveillance and reporting. In addition to the barriers dictated by low levels of development, revealing a disease outbreakmay harm national prestige, commerce, and tourism. For example, nearly every country initially denied or minimized the extent of the HIV/AIDS virus within its borders, and even today, some countries known to have significant rates of HIV infection refuse to cooperate with WHO. Only a few, such as Uganda, Senegal, and Thailand, have launched major preventative efforts, while many WHO members do not even endorse AIDS education in schools. Similarly, some countries deny the existence of cholera within their borders.

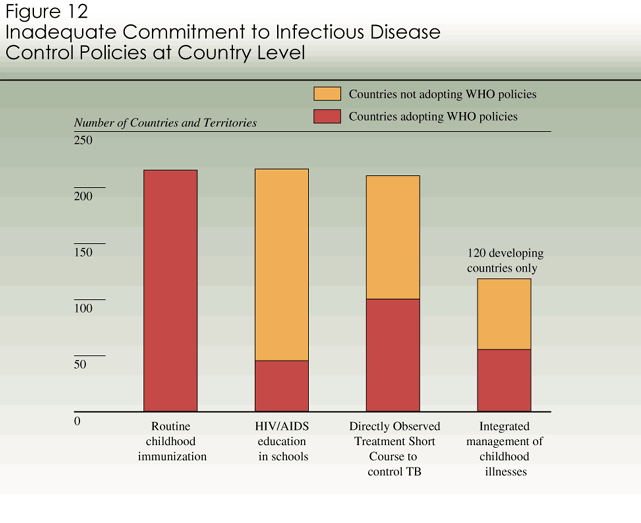
Inadequate Commitment to Infectious Disease Control Policies at Country Level

Aid programs to prevent and treat infectious diseases in developing countries depend largely on indigenous health workers for their success and cannot be fielded effectively in their absence. Training indigenous workers appears more effective than educating the general public of these countries.

International organizations such as WHO and the World Bank, institutions in several developed countries such as the U.S. Centers for Disease Control and Prevention, and Nongovernmental Organizations (NGOs) will continue to play an important role in strengthening both international and national surveillance and response systems for infectious diseases. Development of an integrated global surveillance and response system probably is at least a decade or more away. This owes to the magnitude of the challenge; inadequate coordination at the international level; and lack of funds, capacity, and, in some cases, cooperation and commitment at the national level. Some countries hide or understate their infectious disease problems for reasons of prestige and fear of economic losses. Total international health-related aid to low- and middle-income countries—some $2–3 billion annually—remains a fraction of the $250 billion health bill of these countries.

WHO has the broadest health mandate under the UN system, including setting priorities, coordinating global health surveillance, and emergency assistance in the event of disease outbreaks. Health experts give WHO credit for major successes, such as the eradication of smallpox, near eradication of polio, and substantial progress in controlling childhood diseases, and in expanding primary health care in developing countries. WHO defenders blame continued member state parsimony that has kept WHO's regular biennial budget to roughly $850 million for several years and forced it to rely more on voluntary contributions that often come with strings attached as the cause of its shortcomings. This situation led to lack of focus at the top level as well as overly optimistic forecasts.

The 1998 election of Gro Harlem Brundtland as Secretary General, along with a series of reforms, including expansion of the Emerging and other Communicable Diseases Surveillance and Control (EMC) Division, has placed WHO in a better position to revitalize itself. Internal oversight and transparency have been expanded, programs and budgets are undergoing closer scrutiny, and management accountability is looming larger. Bruntland has moved quickly to revitalize top management, mostly from outside the organization, including from the private sector. She also strengthened country offices and to make the regional offices more responsive to central direction. WHO is increasing its focus on the fight against resurgent malaria, while a better-funded EMC is expanding efforts to establish a global surveillance and response system in cooperation with UNAIDS, UNICEF, and national entities such as the U.S. CDC, the U.S. DoD, and France's Pasteur Institute. Margaret Chan, the current Director-General, is still being assessed; there were questions about her performance as chief of public health for Hong Kong.

WHO competes for resources with other UN agencies that are involved in health care. The United Nations Children's Fund (UNICEF) focuses on children's health. The United Nations AIDS Program (UNAIDS) focuses on improving the response capacity toward HIV/AIDS at the country, regional, and global levels in cooperation with other UN agencies. Other UN agencies involved in health care issues include the UN Development Program (UNDP); the UN Family Planning Agency (UNFPA); the UN High Commissioner for Refugees (UNHCR); the UN Educational, Scientific and Cultural Organization (UNESCO); the International Labor Organization (ILO); the Food and Agricultural Organization (FAO); and the World Food Program (WFP).

=== Alternative scenarios ===
The 1999 estimate looked at three plausible scenarios for the course of the infectious disease threat over the next 20 years:

1. Steady progress to a "health transition" in which such noninfectious diseases as heart disease and cancer would replace infectious diseases as the overarching global health challenge. The intelligence community states this is unlikely, given inadequate emphasis to persistent demographic and socioeconomic challenges in the developing countries, to increasing microbial resistance to existing antibiotics, and because related models have already underestimated the force of major killers such as HIV/AIDS, TB, and malaria.
2. "Progress stymied" is a more pessimistic—and more plausible—scenario which projects little or no progress in countering infectious diseases over the duration of this Estimate. Under this scenario, HIV/AIDS reaches catastrophic proportions as the virus spreads throughout the vast populations of India, China, the former Soviet Union, and Latin America, while multidrug treatments encounter microbial resistance and remain prohibitively expensive for developing countries. Multidrug resistant strains of TB, malaria, and other infectious diseases appear at a faster pace than new drugs and vaccines, wreaking havoc on world health. Although more likely than the "steady progress" scenario, the IC judges this unlikely, because it is overoptimistic about the prospect of development, collaboration, and medical advances to constrain the spread of at least some widespread infectious diseases.
3. "Deterioration, Then Limited Improvement" is judged most likely by the IC. The infectious disease threat—particularly from HIV/AIDS—worsens during the first half of our time frame, but decreases fitfully after that, owing to better prevention and control efforts, new drugs and vaccines, and socioeconomic improvements. In the next decade, under this scenario, negative demographic and social conditions in developing countries, such as continued urbanization and poor health care capacity, remain conducive to the spread of infectious diseases; persistent poverty sustains the least developed countries as reservoirs of infection; and microbial resistance continues to increase faster than the pace of new drug and vaccine development. More positive demographic changes such as reduced fertility and aging populations; gradual socioeconomic improvement in most countries; medical advances; expanded international surveillance and response systems; and improvements in national health care capacities take hold in all but the least developed countries. Barring the appearance of a deadly and highly infectious new disease, a catastrophic upward lurch by HIV/AIDS, or the release of a highly contagious biological agent capable of rapid and widescale secondary spread, these developments produce at least limited gains against the overall infectious disease threat. The remaining virulent diseases, led by HIV/AIDS and TB, continue to take a significant toll.

=== Economic, social, and political impact ===
The persistent infectious disease burden is likely to aggravate and, in some cases, may even provoke economic decay, social fragmentation, and political destabilization in the hardest hit countries in the developing and former communist worlds, especially in the worst-case scenario outlined above:

- The economic costs of infectious diseases, especially HIV/AIDS and malaria, are already significant, and their increasingly heavy toll on productivity, profitability, and foreign investment will be reflected in growing GDP losses, as well, that could reduce GDP by as much as 20 percent or more by 2010 in some Sub-Saharan African countries, according to recent studies.

- Some of the hardest hit countries in Sub-Saharan Africa—and possibly later in South and Southeast Asia—will face a demographic upheaval as HIV/AIDS and associated diseases reduce human life expectancy by as much as 30 years and kill as many as a quarter of their populations over a decade or less, producing a huge orphan cohort. Nearly 42 million children in 27 countries will lose one or both parents to AIDS by 2010; 19 of the hardest hit countries will be in Sub-Saharan Africa.

The relationship between disease and political instability is indirect but real. A wide-ranging study on the causes of state instability suggests that infant mortality—a good indicator of the overall quality of life—correlates strongly with political instability, particularly in countries that already have achieved a measure of democracy. The severe social and economic impact of infectious diseases is likely to intensify the struggle for political power to control scarce state resources.

The United States is at risk from infectious diseases due to its status as a major hub of global travel, immigration, and commerce.

- Emerging and reemerging infectious diseases, many of which are likely to continue to originate overseas, will continue to kill at least 170,000 Americans annually. Many more could perish in an epidemic of influenza or yet-unknown disease or if there is a substantial decline in the effectiveness of available HIV/AIDS drugs.
- Infectious diseases are likely to continue to account for more military hospital admissions than battlefield injuries. U.S. military personnel deployed at NATO and U.S. bases overseas, will be at low-to-moderate risk. At highest risk will be U.S. military forces deployed in support of humanitarian and peacekeeping operations in developing countries.
- The infectious disease burden will weaken the military capabilities of some countries—as well as international peacekeeping efforts—as their armies and recruitment pools experience HIV infection rates ranging from 10 to 60 percent. The cost will be highest among officers and the more modernized militaries in Sub-Saharan Africa and increasingly among FSU states and possibly some rogue states.
- Infectious diseases are likely to slow socioeconomic development in the hardest-hit developing and former communist countries and regions. This will challenge democratic development and transitions and possibly contribute to humanitarian emergencies and civil conflicts.
- Infectious disease-related embargoes and restrictions on travel and immigration will cause frictions among and between developed and developing countries

== Intelligence Community Assessment on the Next Wave of HIV/AIDS ==
In July, 2002, The National Intelligence Council released the Intelligence Community Assessment on the Next Wave of HIV/AIDS. This paper examined HIV epidemics in five countries of strategic importance to the United States that have large populations at risk for HIV infection: Nigeria, Ethiopia, Russia, India, and China.

The five countries were selected because they were:

- Among the world’s most populous countries, together representing over 40 percent of the world population.
- In the early-to-mid-stages of an HIV/AIDS epidemic at the time of analysis.
- Led by governments that have not yet given the issue the sustained high priority that has been key to stemming the tide of the disease in other countries.

The paper concluded that HIV/AIDS is spreading at different rates in the five countries, with the epidemic the most advanced in Nigeria and Ethiopia. In all countries, however, risky sexual behaviors are driving infection rates upward at a precipitous rate.

- Adult prevalence rates—the total number of people infected as a percentage of the adult population—are substantially lower in Russia, India, and China, where the disease remains concentrated in high-risk groups, such as IVDA in Russia and people selling blood plasma in China, where some villages have reported 60% infection rates.
- Nevertheless, the disease is spreading to wider circles through heterosexual transmission in India, the movement of infected migrant workers in China, and frequent prison amnesty releases of large numbers of infected prison inmates and rising prostitution in Russia.

It will be difficult for any of the five countries to check their epidemics by 2010 without dramatic shifts in priorities. The disease has built up significant momentum, health services are inadequate, and the cost of education and treatment programs will be overwhelming. Government leaders will have trouble maintaining a priority on HIV/AIDS—which has been key to stemming the disease in Uganda, Thailand, and Brazil—because of other pressing issues and the lack of AIDS advocacy groups.

- The governments of Nigeria, India, and China are beginning to focus more attention on the HIV/AIDS threat.
- Even if the five next-wave countries devote more resources to HIV/AIDS programs, implementation is likely to miss significant portions of the population, given weak or limited government institutions and uneven coordination between local and national levels.
- Nigeria and Ethiopia have very limited public services to mobilize. Russia is beset by other major public health problems. China has decentralized most responsibility for health and education issues to local governments that often are corrupt.
- India has taken some steps to improve its healthcare infrastructure to combat HIV/AIDS, but the government has few resources to treat existing infections and must cope with other major health problems such as tuberculosis (TB), which has become linked to the spread of HIV/AIDS.

The rise of HIV/AIDS in the next-wave countries is likely to have significant economic, social, political, and military implications. The impact will vary substantially among the five countries, however, because of differences among them in the development of the disease, likely government responses, available resources, and demographic profiles.

- Nigeria and Ethiopia will be the hardest hit, with the social and economic impact similar to that in the hardest hit countries in southern and central Africa: devastation to key government and business elites, undermined growth, and discouragement against foreign investment. Both countries are key to regional stability, and the rise in HIV/AIDS will strain their governments.
- In Russia, the rise in HIV/AIDS will exacerbate the population decline and severe health problems already plaguing the country, creating even greater difficulty for Russia to rebound economically. These trends may spark tensions over spending priorities and sharpen military manpower shortages.
- HIV/AIDS will drive up social and healthcare costs in India and China, but the broader economic and political impact is likely to be readily absorbed by the huge populations of these countries. We do not believe the disease will pose a fundamental threat through 2010 to their status as major regional players, but it will add to the complex problems faced by their leaders. The more HIV/AIDS spreads among young, educated, urban populations, the greater the economic cost of the disease will be for these countries, given the impact on, and the need for, skilled labor.

The growing AIDS problem in the next-wave countries probably will spark calls for more financial and technical support from donor countries. It may lead to growing tensions over how to disburse international funds, such as the Global Fund for AIDS, TB and Malaria.

The cost of antiretroviral drugs—which can prolong the lives of infected people—has plunged in recent years but still may be prohibitively high for low-income countries. More importantly, the drug costs are only a portion of HIV/AIDS treatment costs. Drug-resistant strains are likely to spread because of the inconsistent use of antiretroviral therapies and the manufacture overseas of unregulated, substandard drugs.

- If an effective vaccine is developed in the coming years, Western governments and pharmaceutical companies will come under intense pressure to make it widely available.
- The next-wave countries are likely to seek greater U.S. technical assistance in tracking and combating the disease.

According to UNAIDS, Asia alone is likely to outstrip Sub-Saharan Africa in the absolute number of HIV carriers by 2010.

Governments often do not spend enough money to get quality infection surveillance because they have other budget priorities, do not want to acknowledge the extent of the epidemic, and the drug users and prostitutes at high risk of infection are not key political constituencies.

- Other hidden pockets of infection include TB patients—some of whom have contracted TB because they are HIV positive—and patients with venereal diseases and reproductive tract

infections.

- It is difficult to get data on HIV prevalence rates in foreign military ranks, which harbor significant numbers of infected men.

Even if testing is available, many people do not get tested because of denial, stigma, discrimination, or resignation.

- IVDA, prostitutes, and homosexuals usually are reluctant to identify themselves for fear of punishment.
- Some avoid testing when healthcare and treatment for the disease is unavailable.

=== Nigeria ===
Heterosexual transmission of HIV is the primary mode of spread in Nigeria, and infections appear to be as numerous in rural areas as in the cities. In other words, HIV is endemic in the general population. The reported rate of infection apparently varies significantly by region, with the lowest reported rate found generally in the predominantly Muslim northern parts of the country. Infections are most numerous among men ages 20 through 24, but some experts caution that infection rates are rising quickly in young women.

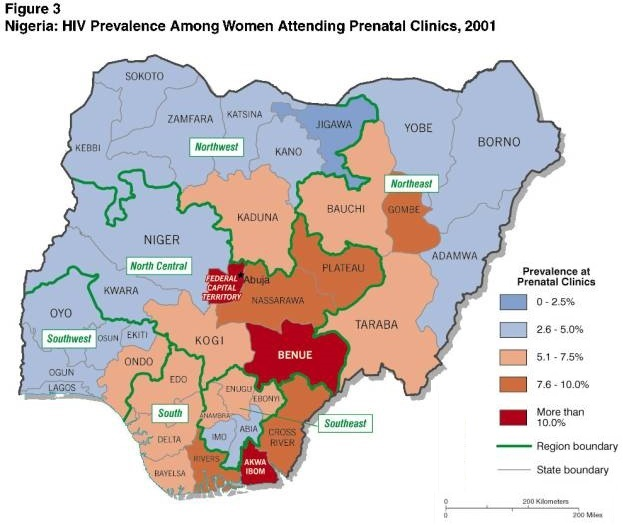
Nigerian HIV prevalence at prenatal clinics

Given the already advanced state of the disease and the government's limited capacity to respond, the Intelligence Community expects HIV/AIDS to infect as many as 10 to 15 million people by 2010. Nigerian prevalence may be 18 to 26 percent of adults—close to the current rates in some of the hardest hit countries in southern Africa. This graphic is of a second-wave country; Southern Africa is already badly affected by the first wave.

=== Ethiopia ===
Ethiopia is estimated to have the highest adult prevalence rate, between 10 and 18%—was the highest among the five countries. This reflects two social effects:

- Like Nigeria, the disease has moved into the general population
- Unlike the other countries, the effects of war have a significant effect on spread

- Another surge of infections may be underway from the 150,000 demobilized soldiers over the last two years as the conflict with Eritrea has wound down. More troops will be sent home as the border dispute is settled.
- As soldiers demobilize, prostitutes—who have even higher rates of infection—disperse around the country as well.

The figure to the right shows prevalence at prenatal clinics, which appears to be the best single indicator.

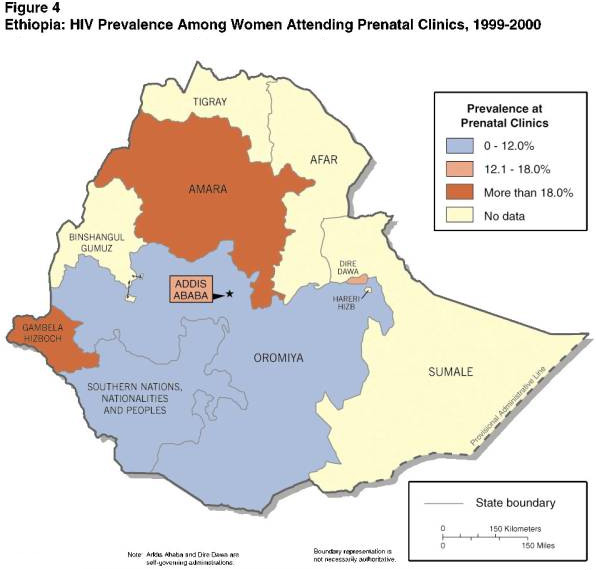
HIV seropositivity at Ethiopian prenatal clinics

Expert estimates the actual number of HIV patients may be between 3 and 5 million. Adult prevalence is much higher in cities (13–20%) than in rural areas (5%). Heterosexual transmission is the primary mode of spread, and people with multiple partners—especially those with sexually transmitted diseases (STDs) and prostitutes—have significantly higher infection rates.

Unlike conditions in other next-wave countries, war has significantly contributed to the spread of the disease in Ethiopia. Many soldiers contracted HIV/AIDS during the civil war in the 1980s by having contact with multiple sex partners. When the war ended in 1991, thousands of infected soldiers and prostitutes returned home, spreading HIV/AIDS in their villages and towns.

Ethiopians, due to result of drought, malnutrition, limited healthcare, and other infectious diseases, have generally poor health. In the HIV-seropositive group, this has caused HIV to progress rapidly to AIDS. Looking ahead, we expect 7 to 10 million Ethiopians probably will be infected by 2010 because of the high current rate of adult prevalence, widespread poverty, low educational levels, and the government's limited capacity to respond more actively.

=== Russia ===
Each country in the second wave have different social factors causing increased spread. HIV has not yet made a move into the general populations of some countries, such as Russia. The single social factor (80–90% of new cases) for Russian spread is IVDA; prostitutes and prison inmates (many of whom are IVDAs) are contributing to the spread of the disease. Drug use is so widespread that many users are integrated into society with jobs and families, suggesting the disease is moving into the mainstream. An estimated 20–25% of IVDA in prison, where there is easy access to drugs, are seropositive.

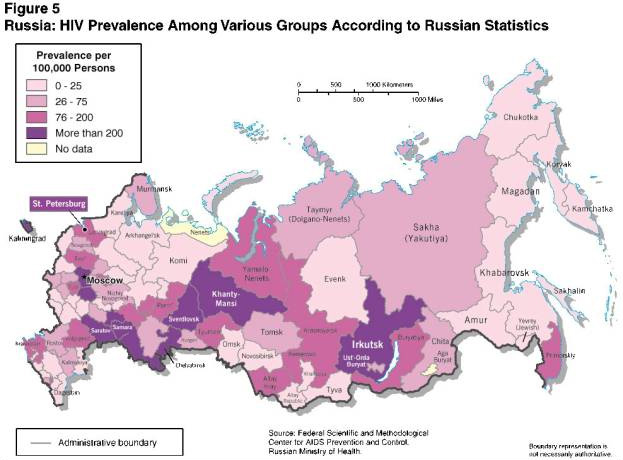
Russian 2nd Wave, general population by region

HIV/AIDS also is increasing in the Russian military services. Up to 33% of prospective conscripts are deemed unfit for service owing to the effects of prior drug use (chronic hepatitis or HIV infection). Enlisted men in the ground troops have the largest number of infections, while strategic military forces and airborne troops have the lowest.

=== India ===
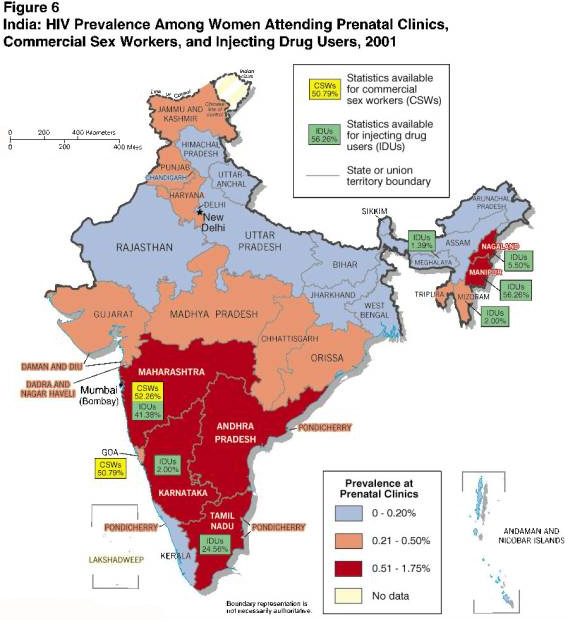
HIV spread projection from multiple sources

== Intelligence Community Assessment on Severe Acute Respiratory Syndrome ==
The outbreak of Severe Acute Respiratory Syndrome (SARS) has been overcome, but SARS has not been eradicated. Although WHO declared on 5 July 2003 that all transmission chains of SARS had been broken, many health experts fear it could return again. We remain vulnerable.

The major concerns include:

- The possible presence of animal reservoirs of the coronavirus that causes SARS
- lack of a reliable diagnostic test
- lack of a vaccine for eradication.
- If a resurgence of SARS this winter coincides with the annual outbreak of influenza, identifying and isolating suspected SARS cases will be much more difficult. SARS also could mutate, altering the symptoms, transmissibility, or lethality of the disease.
- As the first line of defense, healthcare systems and workers are particularly vulnerable. Moreover, most wealthy countries have little recent experience implementing large-scale quarantine and isolation programs, and poor countries already have inadequate health surveillance and infection control procedures.

The emergence of SARS illustrates the challenge of battling infectious diseases in an increasingly globalized world. Global links have sped the geographic spread of the disease and amplified the economic and political impact.

=== The initial SARS outbreak ===
SARS exemplifies the potential of an infection spread through air travel. The first case of SARS was reportedly originated from a rural area in Foshan, Guangdong, in Nov 2002, and the patient, a farmer, was treated in the First People's Hospital of Foshan. The patient died soon after, and no definite diagnosis was made on his cause of death. China delayed reporting this to international health organizations, and SARS spread beyond China.

Outside China, the first clue of the outbreak appears to be November 27, 2002 when Canada's Global Public Health Intelligence Network (GPHIN), an electronic warning system that is part of the World Health Organization's (WHO) Global Outbreak and Alert Response Network (GOARN), picked up reports of a "flu outbreak" in China through internet media monitoring and analysis and sent them to the WHO.

Subsequently, the WHO requested information from Chinese authorities on December 5 and 11. Importantly, while GPHIN's capability had recently been upgraded to enable Arabic, Chinese, English, French, Russian and Spanish translation, the system was limited to English or French in presenting this information. Thus, while the first reports of an unusual outbreak were in Chinese, an English report was not generated until January 21, 2003.

In late April, revelations occurred as the PRC government admitted to underreporting the number of cases of SARS due to the problems inherent in the healthcare system. Dr. Jiang Yanyong exposed the coverup that was occurring in China, at great personal risk. A number of PRC officials were fired from their posts, including the health minister and mayor of Beijing, and systems were set up to improve reporting and control in the SARS crisis. Since then, the PRC has taken a much more active and transparent role in combating the SARS epidemic.

=== Potential of SARS recurrence ===
Political leadership has been a key variable in managing the epidemic. China's efforts to hide the initial outbreak allowed SARS to build up dangerous momentum before Chinese officials became more open, while Vietnam's willingness to promptly highlight the threat and seek international assistance helped offset the country's weak healthcare system. The more SARS spread, the tougher countries became in implementing control measures, including quarantining and isolating people to stop its transmission.

- Although SARS has killed far fewer people than die each year from more common maladies such as pneumonia, influenza, malaria, tuberculosis, and HIV/AIDS, it generated significant attention and created a sense of urgency to respond because it was a mysterious new illness that seemed able to go anywhere and hit anyone.
- SARS hit parts of Asia and Canada with extensive commercial links to the rest of the world. Although the economic impact, particularly in China, was less severe than initially forecast, SARS wreaked havoc on the tourism and travel industries, erasing revenues and jobs.
- The same forces of globalization that drove the spread of SARS also have been key to managing it. Modern advances in communication, science, and travel almost certainly helped alert people more quickly to the disease, facilitated a stronger national and international response, and sped research efforts to help contain the disease.

The intense focus on SARS has opened a window of opportunity for the United States and the WHO to pursue longer-term bilateral and multilateral cooperation on health issues.

=== Three scenarios for SARS ===
The future course of SARS will depend on a host of complex variables, making forecasting difficult. Complexity and uncertainty preclude assessing the relative likelihood of any one of the three. SARS, even in a developed country, demands extremely careful nursing practices to avoid having the disease spread by medical personnel, according to WHO. Countries that lack the necessary respirators and other barrier nursing equipment can risk spread.

The first scenarion is "SARS Simmers": SARS could resurface but be limited to random outbreaks in a few countries, rendering it more of a public health nuisance than a crisis. Political and economic reverberations still would occur, with some companies and investors looking to reduce their exposure in East Asia, particularly China.

The next alternative is that "SARS Gains a Foothold in Poor Countries, Regions. SARS could spread to poor countries in Africa or Asia, potentially generating more infections and deaths than before but with relatively little international economic impact. The risk of spread would continue, however, even if SARS emerged in poor countries or isolated regions of Russia and China with weak healthcare systems. WHO and CDC probably would come under intense pressure to provide money and technical assistance to compensate for weak healthcare systems.

Some isolated countries such as North Korea probably would resist outside assistance, even at the risk of putting their own citizens at risk and requiring the U.S. to improve its medical intelligence collection to protect its own and allied forces. Some repressive regimes hit by SARS are likely to employ brutal tactics to quarantine and isolate people, possibly sowing division among outside countries and multilateral organizations over how to respond to apparent human rights violations.

The worst case is a full resurgence of SARS could come back in the places it hit before—such as China, Taiwan, Canada, and Singapore—or hit harder in other well-connected places like the United States, Japan, Europe, India, or Brazil. Even if the number of infected persons were not significantly greater, the resurgence of the disease in globally linked countries probably would generate a significant impact again. The return of SARS to Asia is likely to cause somewhat less disruption the second time as citizens learn to live with the disease, but more multinational companies probably would reduce their exposure in the region if they concluded that SARS posed a long-term health challenge. Bigger outbreaks in Europe or the United States would hit a whole new set of business and government players, potentially doing serious damage to trade and growth.
