= Marine Security Guard =

Marine Corps Embassy Security Group
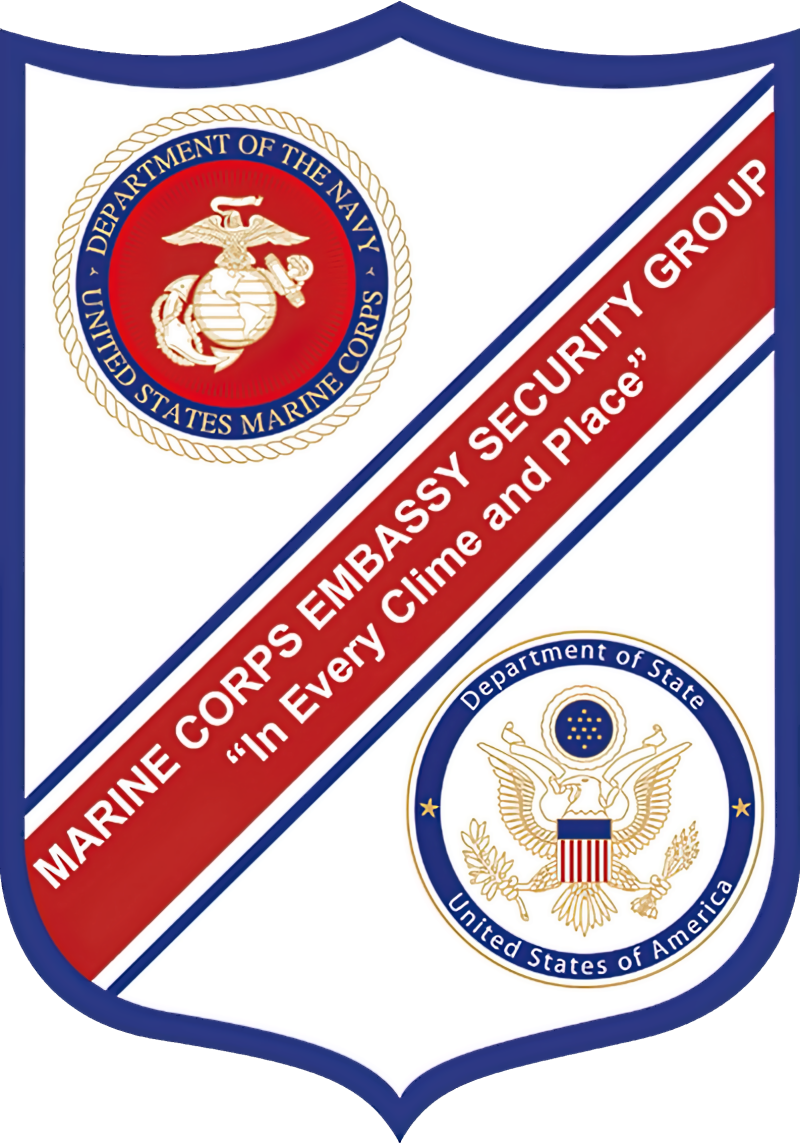
- Founded: 1948
- Country: United States of America
- Branch: United States Marine Corps
- Type: Marines Security forces
- Role: Embassy security
- Size: approx. 1,800 at 176 locations
- Garrison/HQ: MCB Quantico, Virginia, U.S.
- Nicknames: "Marine Security Guards", "Marine Embassy Guards"
- Mottos: In Every Clime and Place
- Engagements: 1979 U.S. embassy burning in Islamabad; 1983 Beirut US embassy bombing 2026 Iran war: 2026 attack on the United States consulate in Karachi

Commanders
- Current commander: Colonel Clifford S. Magee

Overview of the Marine Security Guard selection and training, c. 1964 (25:57)

A Marine Security Guard (MSG), also known as a Marine Embassy Guard, is a member of the Marine Corps Embassy Security Group (formerly Marine Security Guard Battalion), a brigade-sized organization of the United States Marine Corps (USMC) whose detachments provide security at American embassies, consulates, and other official U.S. government offices, such as the United States Mission to NATO in Brussels, Belgium. (Note: The Marine Security Guard was initially designated MOS 8151, though this has changed to MOS 8156.)

The USMC has a long history of cooperation with the U.S. Department of State, which administers the nation's diplomatic posts; Marines have served on special missions as couriers, guards for embassies and delegations, and security for U.S. citizens in the frontier. Notable examples include engagements at Derna and Tripoli, the secret mission of Archibald H. Gillespie in the Mexican–American War, and actions during the Boxer Rebellion.

However, the formal and permanent use of Marines as security guards began with the Foreign Service Act of 1946, which authorized the secretary of the Navy, upon the request of the secretary of state, to assign Marines to serve as custodians under the supervision of the senior diplomatic officer at a diplomatic post; pursuant to the act, the first joint Memorandum of Agreement between the Department of the Navy and the Department of State was signed on 15 December 1948 regarding the provisions of assigning Marines overseas. Initially trained at the Foreign Service Institute, the first Marines arrived at Tangier and Bangkok in early 1949; the Marine Corps has assumed primary training responsibility since November 1954.

The authority granted in the Foreign Service Act of 1946 has since been replaced by 10 U.S.C. § 8183 and the most recent Memorandum of Agreement was signed in October 2020. The Corps is budgeted to train and maintain a limited cadre of guards to cover over 100 embassies worldwide. Embassy duty has been a crucial and longstanding aspect of the Marines’ mission. In response to the 2012 Benghazi attack, Congress ordered a near doubling of Marine Security Guards in the midst of a post-war drawdown in overall USMC numbers. The USMC has responded by redeploying one company from 1st Battalion 1st Marines while additional guards are trained.

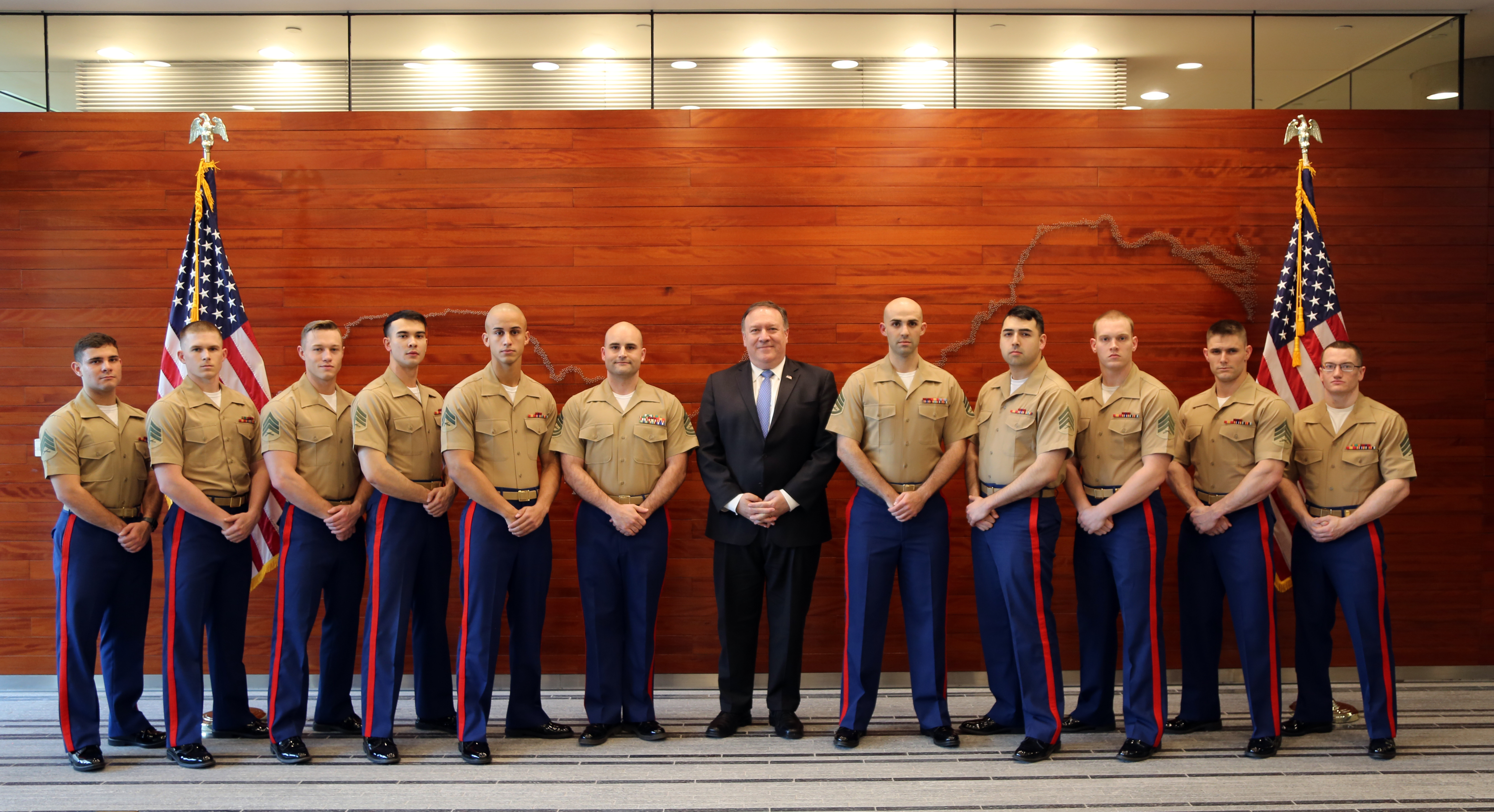
Marine Security Guards in Embassy of the United States, Beijing

== Responsibilities ==
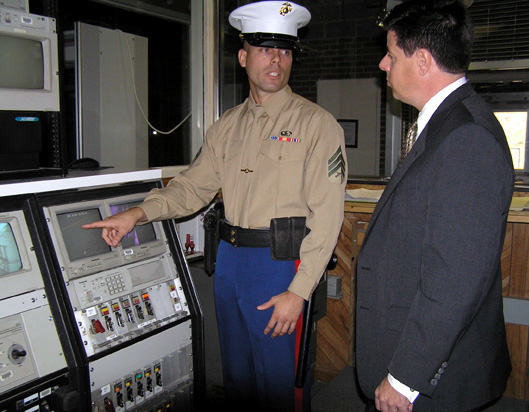
A Marine Security Guard examines a security system in December 2004.

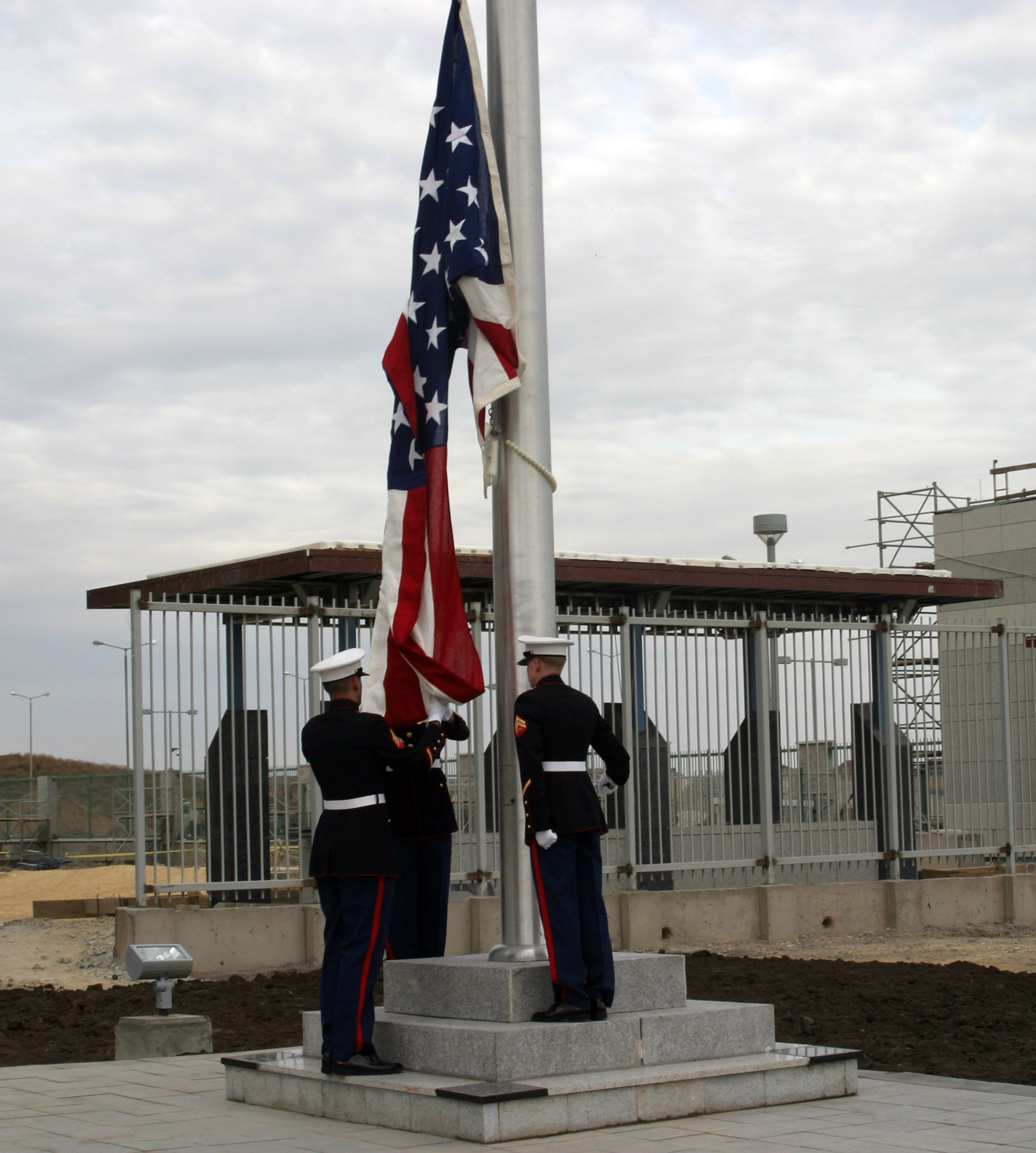
Marine Security Guards raising the American flag at a new U.S. embassy in Astana, Kazakhstan, in 2006

The primary mission of the MSG is to provide security, particularly the protection of classified information and equipment vital to the national security of the United States at American diplomatic posts. This is accomplished under the guidance and operational control of a civilian federal agent of the Diplomatic Security Service, known as the Regional Security Officer (RSO) who is the senior U.S. law enforcement representative and security attaché at U.S. diplomatic posts around the world. In addition, MSGs provide security for visiting American dignitaries and frequently assist the RSO in supervising host country or locally employed security forces that provide additional security for the exterior of diplomatic missions. The MSGs fall under operational control of the RSO and are administratively controlled by the Marine Corps Embassy Security Group.

Marine Security Guards also provide protection for personnel and classified material located within designated diplomatic missions.

MSGs focus on the interior security of a diplomatic post's buildings. In only the most extreme emergency situations are they authorized to provide special protection to the senior diplomatic officer off the diplomatic compound. MSGs carry a certain level of diplomatic immunity in the performance of their official duties.

== Organization ==
The Marine Security Guards number approximately a thousand Marines at 174 posts (also known as "detachments"), organized into nine regional MSG commands and located in over 135 countries in 18 time zones, as well as its headquarters at Marine Corps Base Quantico. Headquarters Company, along with MSG School, is composed of approximately 100 Marines providing administrative, logistical, legal, training and education support.

The remaining nine regions are commanded by a lieutenant colonel, and typically entail a number of detachments in several countries. The companies are as follows:

Region	Headquarters	Area of responsibility	Detachments
1	Frankfurt, Germany	Eastern Europe and Eurasia	20
2	Abu Dhabi, United Arab Emirates	South Asia and the Middle East	20
3	Bangkok, Thailand	East Asia and Pacific	23
4	Fort Lauderdale, Florida	South America	13
5	Frankfurt, Germany	Western Europe and Scandinavia	20
6	Johannesburg, South Africa	East Africa and Southern Africa	24
7	Frankfurt, Germany	North Africa and West Africa	20
8	Frankfurt, Germany	Central Europe	19
9	Fort Lauderdale, Florida	Mexico, Central America, and the Caribbean	21

Each Detachment is commanded by a Staff Non-Commissioned Officer, being one of the few instances where an enlisted Marine may hold the title of "commander". Generally between the ranks of Staff Sergeant and Master Gunnery Sergeant, Marine Detachment Commanders serve two tours, which generally last 18 months each. Unlike their subordinates, however, Detachment Commanders may be married. The minimum detachment size is seven MSGs (Marine Security Guards) and one detachment commander. This allows for posts to be manned at all times while allowing each of the Marines to conduct other routine training, internal management of the detachment and have some time off. A Marine Security Guard usually serves three 12-month tours of duty. Marine Security Guard "watch standers" are enlisted Marines from the rank of Private First Class to Staff Sergeant.

== Duty ==
Marine Corps Security Guard Ribbon

After every three years as a Marine Security Guard with the Marine Corps Embassy Security Group, any Marine is entitled to the Marine Corps Security Guard Ribbon. According to the Marine Corps Uniform Regulations Order (Section 4-4a Line 24) Marine Security Guards are authorized to wear subsequent service stars.

Marines of any Military Occupational Specialty may volunteer for a three-year tour of duty; however, non-Staff NCOs with dependents are not eligible, as well as Marines with potentially offensive tattoos, legal or security restrictions, non–United States citizenship, dual citizenship, significant financial indiscretions, and any other restriction that would prevent a top secret clearance.

Before being assigned to a Foreign Service post, a Marine accepted into the MSG program must successfully complete a training program located at the Marine Corps Embassy Security Group (MCESG), which is located at Marine Corps Base Quantico, Virginia. Marine Security Guard duty is one of a few special duty assignments available to qualified Marines. Marine Security Guard duty can be dangerous; there have been instances where Marines have been killed during this duty (most recently, Cpl Steve Crowley in 1979, Cpl Robert V. McMaugh in 1983, and Sgt Jesse Aliganga in 1998). Embassy duty is a crucial aspect of the Marine Corps' mission with a long tradition; the Corps is currently tasked to train and maintain a cadre of guards to cover 181 embassies and consulates worldwide with the ability to augment assigned forces as necessary.

== See also ==
- Marine Corps Security Force Regiment
- White House sentries
- Embassy of the United States, Baghdad
