= CIA fake vaccination campaign in Pakistan =

Covert operation of the U.S. Central Intelligence Agency

During the manhunt for Osama bin Laden, the CIA ran a covert operation utilizing a fake hepatitis vaccine program in Pakistan to illicitly collect DNA samples from bin Laden's suspected family. The CIA allegedly recruited local physician Shakil Afridi to administer hepatitis B vaccines, and compared the collected DNA with the DNA of bin Laden's sister, who died in Boston in 2010.

The program was ultimately unsuccessful in locating bin Laden. It led to the arrest of Shakil Afridi, and was widely ridiculed as undermining public health. The program is credited with increasing vaccine hesitancy in Pakistan and a rise in violence against healthcare workers for being perceived as spies. The rise in vaccine hesitancy following the program led to the re-emergence of polio in Pakistan, with Pakistan having by far the largest number of polio cases in the world by 2014.

== Aftermath ==
In September 2012, after working for 30 years in Pakistan, Save the Children was expelled.

In 2011, the program was condemned by Doctors without Borders. In February 2012, the program was condemned by the non-governmental organization InterAction. On 6 January 2013, the deans of twelve American schools of public health sent a letter to Obama condemning the program.

On 16 May 2014, Lisa Monaco responded that vaccine programs would be excluded from espionage:

"I wanted to inform you that the Director of the Central Intelligence Agency (CIA) directed in August 2013 that the agency make no operational use of vaccination programs, which includes vaccination workers. Similarly, the Agency will not seek to obtain or exploit DNA or other genetic material acquired through such programs. This CIA policy applies worldwide and to U.S. and non-U.S. persons alike."

== Shakil Afridi ==
Shakil Afridi
- Born: 1962 (age 63–64); Malikdinkhel, Bara, Khyber Agency, FATA, Pakistan
- Education: Khyber Medical College
- Occupation: Physician
- Known for: Helped CIA run fake Hepatitis B vaccine program in Abbottabad, Pakistan, to confirm Osama bin Laden's presence through DNA samples.

Shakil Afridi (Urdu: شکیل آفریدی), or Shakeel Afridi, is a Pakistani physician who allegedly helped run the fake program in Abbottabad, Khyber Pakhtunkhwa. Details of his activities emerged during the Pakistani investigation of the deadly raid on bin Laden's residence. This account is disputed in a 2015 account of events which implies Afridi was implicated as a cover for the real CIA operative. Afridi was arrested at the Torkham while trying to flee the country days after the raid. On 23 May 2012, he was sentenced to 33 years' imprisonment for treason, initially believed to be in connection with the bin Laden raid, but later revealed to be due to alleged ties with a local Islamist warlord Mangal Bagh. Lawyers appealed against the verdict on 1 June 2012. On 29 August 2013, his sentence was overturned and a retrial ordered.

In mid-November 2013, he was charged with murder in regard to the death of a patient he had treated eight years previously.

=== Biography ===
Afridi comes from a Pashtun family and in 1990 graduated from the Khyber Medical College, Peshawar. He had been working as the doctor in-charge of Khyber Agency of the former Federally Administered Tribal Areas of Pakistan. The doctor has a family. As of 2012, Afridi is serving a 33-year sentence in a Pakistani jail, convicted of charges unrelated to his alleged CIA connections. Sentenced for supporting a Pakistani warlord, many of Afridi's supporters appear to have abandoned him at home and abroad, including his alleged U.S. supporters within the CIA and the Obama Administration. He is a native of Khyber Agency. There are numerous online petitions and web pages dedicated to freeing him, such as the "Free Dr. Shakil Afridi NOW" Facebook page with over 400 likes.

=== Pakistan's accusations against Afridi ===
Afridi was the chief surgeon at Jamrud Hospital in Pakistan's northwestern Khyber tribal region. His colleagues were suspicious of Afridi's absences, which he explained as "business" to attend to in Abbottabad. Afridi was accused of having taken six World Health Organization cooler boxes without authorization. The containers are for inoculation campaigns, but no immunization drives were underway in Abbottabad or the Khyber Agency.

On 6 October 2011, the Pakistani commission investigating bin Laden's death recommended that he be charged with "conspiracy against the state of Pakistan and high treason" on the basis of available evidence. Pakistan seized Afridi's assets. Afridi's residence was sealed by Pakistani authorities and his family moved to an undisclosed location. The fifteen male and female health workers who assisted Afridi in the fake hepatitis vaccination program were also declared not fit for any future employment.

Pakistani investigators said in a July 2012 report that Afridi met 25 times with "foreign secret agents, received instructions and provided sensitive information to them." According to Pakistani reports, Afridi told investigators that the charity Save the Children helped facilitate his meeting with U.S. intelligence agents although the charity denies the charge. The report alleges that Save the Children's Pakistan director introduced Afridi to a western woman in Islamabad and that Afridi and the woman met regularly afterwards.

=== Sentencing ===
On 28 May 2012, Prime Minister Yousaf Raza Gillani said according to the law in Pakistan, Afridi has the right to defend himself and should be granted access to higher courts.

On 30 May 2012, Afridi was sentenced to 33 years in prison for aiding banned militant group Lashkar-e-Islam and not for his links to the CIA, as officials had said earlier, according to a court document.

The court sentenced Afridi under the Frontier Crimes Regulation, 1901 a colonial era law. According to the verdict, Afridi would serve 33 years in prison and has to pay Rs. 230,000 as a fine. He was initially detained at the Apbara headquarters of the ISI in Islamabad before being moved to a Peshawar Central Jail in May 2012.

On 1 June 2012, Afridi's lawyers appealed his conviction.

On 29 August 2013, senior Pakistani judicial official Sahibzada Mohammad Anis issued a ruling that overturned Afridi's sentence and ordered him a retrial. This was due to the decision that the original person who sentenced the doctor was not authorized to hear the case.

In mid-November 2013, the Reuters news agency reported that he had just been charged with murder in regard to the death, eight years earlier, of a patient he had treated. In March 2015, Samiullah Khan Afridi, Afridi's former lawyer, was shot dead in Peshawar. A Pakistani Taliban faction named Jamaat-ul-Ahrar claimed responsibility for his murder.

=== Current condition ===
In September 2012, Dominic Di-Natale, an Islamabad-based correspondent for Fox News said that he had interviewed Afridi by phone from inside the jail and spoke to him thrice between five and 45 minutes. In the interview, Afridi described being routinely tortured by the Pakistani Inter-Services Intelligence (ISI) with cigarette burns and electric shocks while at ISI Headquarters at Aabpara. Citing "very strict security," Afridi's lawyer told BBC News that he had doubts of the authenticity of the interview. Di-Natale was blacklisted by Pakistan barring him from returning to the country. Family members and a member of his legal counsel also stated Afridi had been tortured while in Pakistani custody during November 2012. In March 2014, Waad ur Rahman, an Express Tribune blogger argued that through a fair trial, Afridi would also have a chance to defend why he did not disclose the location of bin Laden to Pakistani authorities. He said, only denial of fair trial, makes him an absolute victim of law.

In late November 2012 Pakistani news provider, The Express Tribune, reported that Afridi had gone on a hunger strike protesting his prison conditions in the Peshawar jail. News also reported that regarding his treatment the U.S. State Department had "made their views well known to Pakistan and the public at large."

In May 2018, Afridi was moved from prison to a 'safer location' by Pakistani intelligence officials. He remains isolated from the general population.

During then-Prime Minister of Pakistan Imran Khan's visit to Washington, DC, in July 2019, in his interview with an American television channel, he indicated Shakil Afridi could be released in exchange for Aafia Siddiqui. In February 2025, the government of Pakistan rejected the proposal to swap Afridi with Aafia Siddiqui labeling it 'not workable'.

=== Reactions to arrest and sentencing ===
==== U.S. response ====
The U.S. Secretary of Defense, who was then former CIA Chief Leon Panetta, has confirmed the role of Afridi in ascertaining the whereabouts of bin Laden inside the compound in Abbottabad. U.S. Secretary of State Hillary Clinton has said that Pakistan has no justification for holding Afridi. The U.S. representative for California's 48th congressional district, Dana Rohrabacher asked President Barack Obama to intercede on Afridi's behalf, introduced two bills, H.R. 4069 to award a Congressional Gold Medal to Afridi and H.R. 3901 to declare Afridi a naturalized U.S. citizen.

The U.S. Senate panel cut $33 million in aid to Pakistan over the conviction of Afridi: $1 million for each of the 33 years of Afridi's sentence.

U.S. authorities said that before his arrest, Afridi turned down an opportunity to leave his country and resettle overseas with his family. On 31 May 2012, U.S. authorities said that they sought clarification from Pakistan on the issue of Afridi's sentence.

In June 2011, it was reported in The New York Times, The Washington Post and all over the Pakistani press that Amir Aziz had been held for questioning in Pakistan; he was, it was said, a CIA informant who had been spying on the comings and goings at the bin Laden compound. Aziz was released, but the retired official said that U.S. intelligence was unable to learn who leaked the highly classified information about his involvement with the mission. Officials in Washington decided they "could not take a chance that Aziz's role in obtaining bin Laden's DNA also would become known." A sacrificial lamb was needed, and the one chosen was Afridi, a 48-year-old Pakistani doctor and sometime CIA asset, who had been arrested by the Pakistanis in late May and accused of assisting the agency. "We went to the Pakistanis and said go after Afridi", the retired official said. "We had to cover the whole issue of how we got the DNA." It was soon reported that the CIA had organized a fake vaccination program in Abbottabad with Afridi's help in a failed attempt to obtain bin Laden's DNA. Afridi's legitimate medical operation was run independently of local health authorities, was well financed and offered free vaccinations against hepatitis B. Posters advertising the program were displayed throughout the area. Afridi was later accused of treason and sentenced to 33 years in prison because of his ties to an extremist. News of the CIA-sponsored program created widespread anger in Pakistan, and led to the cancellation of other international vaccination programs that were now seen as cover for American spying.

The retired official said that Afridi had been recruited long before the bin Laden mission as part of a separate intelligence effort to get information about suspected terrorists in Abbottabad and the surrounding area. "The plan was to use vaccinations as a way to get the blood of terrorism suspects in the villages." Afridi made no attempt to obtain DNA from the residents of the bin Laden compound. The report that he did so was a hurriedly put together "CIA cover story creating 'facts'" in a clumsy attempt to protect Aziz and his real mission. "Now we have the consequences", the retired official said. "A great humanitarian project to do something meaningful for the peasants has been compromised as a cynical hoax." Afridi's conviction was overturned, but he remains in prison on a murder charge.

James Curran, dean of the Rollins School of Public Health at Emory University, stated that spy agencies should consider the consequences of using health care institutions for their own ends: "It is always important to disassociate public health missions from wartime or spy missions that could disrupt the bonds of community trust."

In 2024 deputy spokesperson of US State Department Vedant Patel has said that there is no update regarding Dr. Shakeel Afridi.

==== Protest by aid groups ====
Humanitarian organizations, including Médecins Sans Frontières, protested the use of a medical charity for espionage purposes believing it would cause suspicion of such organizations in the future and endanger personnel working on such projects claiming 'threatened immunization work around the world'.

In May 2012 the Access to Justice Through Legal Aid and Welfare Organisation Peshawar named a panel of lawyers to defend Dr Afridi in his appeal against his conviction.

==== Lashkar-e-Islam reaction ====
On 31 May 2012, Lashkar-e-Islam militants said they had nothing to do with Afridi and would kill him if given the chance. A commander in the militant organization told the AFP, "We have no link to such a shameless man. If we see him, we'll chew him alive."

The court said Afridi paid two million rupees (US$21,000) to Lashkar-e-Islam and helped to provide medical assistance to militant commanders in Khyber. But the commander said the $21,000 was a fine imposed for over-charging patients. "Afridi and his fellow doctor were fleecing tribesmen, giving them fake medicines and doing fake surgeries. We had a lot of complaints against them and imposed a fine of two million rupees on them," he said. Local residents have also told AFP that Mangal Bagh fined Afridi for performing "unnecessary surgeries and over-charging" patients at his private clinic in the town of Bara.

== See also ==
- CIA activities in Pakistan
- CIA transnational health and economic activities
- Perfidy
- Jamrud, located in the Federally Administered Tribal Areas, where the hospital was that Afridi was the chief surgeon of.
