= Consulate General of the United States, Peshawar =

- Seal of the United States Department of State

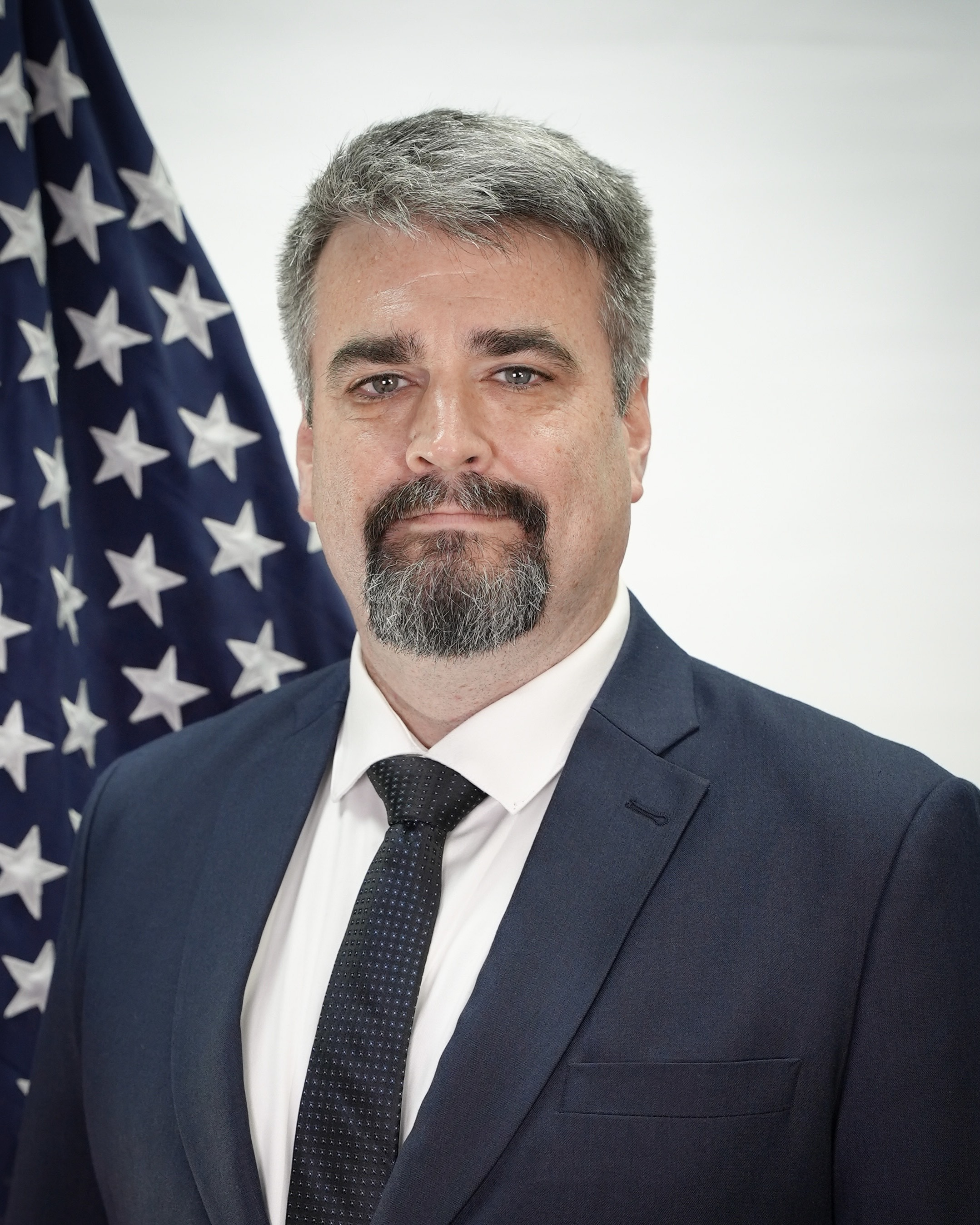
- Incumbent; Thomas Eckert since September 2025
- Style: Consul General
- Nominator: Donald Trump
- Website: U.S. Consulate General Peshawar

The Consulate General of the United States is a diplomatic mission of the United States in Peshawar, Pakistan. (Note: Urdu: امریکی قونصل خانہ، پشاور) It operates under the U.S. embassy in Islamabad and serves U.S. consular interests in the Khyber Pakhtunkhwa region.

== Location ==
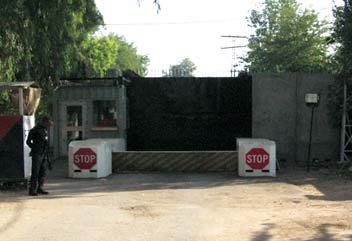
Northwest gate of the consulate prior to the 2010 bombing

The consulate is located at 11 Hospital Road in the Peshawar Cantonment area.

== History ==
On 5 April 2010, a bombing near the consulate killed 8 people including 2 security personnel, although no Americans were affected. According to reports, the U.S. consulate was the intended target of the attack.

On 1 March 2016, two Pakistani employees of the U.S. consulate were killed in an IED blast while involved in a drug-eradication campaign.

== Operations ==
The consulate operates in business hours from Monday to Friday. Key consular sections include political/economic, public affairs, regional security, as well as the Pakistan Deputy Mission Director for Khyber Pakhtunkhwa.

== See also ==
- Embassy of the United States, Islamabad
- Consulate General of the United States, Karachi
- Consulate General of the United States, Lahore
- Pakistan–United States relations
