= 1979 U.S. embassy burning in Islamabad =

Large Islamist riot in Pakistan's capital city

1979 United States embassy burning in Islamabad
- Part of Islamization in Pakistan
- Rioters in the Diplomatic Enclave gather as smoke rises from the embassy and a helicopter of the Pakistan Army hovers overhead.

- Location: 33.725°N 73.117°E; Islamabad, Pakistan
- Date: 21–22 November 1979; 12:00 p.m. – 6:30 a.m. (UTC+5:00)
- Target: Embassy of the United States
- Attack type: Riot, arson, shooting
- Deaths: 4 embassy personnel: (2 Americans, 2 Pakistanis), 2 protesters
- Injuries: 70+
- Perpetrator: Jamaat-e-Islami
- Assailants: Students of Quaid-i-Azam University and other locals
- No. of participants: 1,500+
- Defenders: Marine Security Guards; Pakistan Army
- Motive: Incitement by Iranian disinformation

Beginning at 12:00 p.m. on 21 November 1979, a large mob of Pakistani citizens violently stormed the Embassy of the United States in Islamabad and subsequently burned it down in a coordinated attack. The riot was led by local Islamists aligned with the Islamist Pakistani political party Jamaat-i-Islami, and the mob primarily comprised students from Quaid-i-Azam University. Lasting for almost 24 hours, the riot had been incited by Iranian religious cleric Ruhollah Khomeini, who was leading the Islamic Revolution at the time, after he falsely claimed in a widespread Iranian radio broadcast that the then-ongoing Grand Mosque seizure in Saudi Arabia had been orchestrated by the United States and Israel, prompting many anti-American riots throughout the Muslim world. During the attack, the Pakistani rioters took several American diplomats hostage with the intent of carrying out show trials and public executions. In addition to Islamabad, there were similarly large riots in Karachi, Lahore, and Rawalpindi, where a number of American cultural centers were attacked and burned down.

Four embassy personnel were killed in the attack: a U.S. Marine Security Guard, a U.S. Army warrant officer, and two local Pakistani employees. The American ambassador Arthur W. Hummel Jr. was outside of the embassy at the time of the attack and therefore was able to escape from the rioters before being harmed. Shortly after the riots began, American president Jimmy Carter contacted Pakistani president Muhammad Zia-ul-Haq by phone to warn him against allowing the embassy employees' safety to be compromised. However, Zia proved reluctant to dispatch troops to disperse the crowd. By the morning of 22 November, the Pakistan Army moved in to retake the embassy grounds: two of the rioting students were killed and as many as 70 additional rioters were injured. According to witnesses at the nearby British High Commission, well over 1,500 people took part in the attack on the embassy.

The burning of the embassy in Islamabad played into Khomeini's Islamic Revolution export propaganda amidst the Iran hostage crisis, and Khomeini himself later publicly praised the Pakistani rioters' actions after hearing about the attack. Zia condemned the embassy burning as "not in keeping with lofty Islamic traditions" while refraining from overtly criticizing Jamaat-i-Islami, which had been a political ally in his Islamization of Pakistan.

== Background ==
=== Islamism in Pakistan ===
Islamism started to become popular in Pakistan after Saudi Arabia, which had a state religion of Wahhabism, began sponsoring religious endowments in the country. In 1977 Army Chief of Staff Muhammad Zia-ul-Haq overthrew and executed the secular Prime Minister Zulfikar Ali Bhutto in a 1977 coup d'état and began implementing Islamic law.

=== Masjid al-Haram seizure and Iranian propaganda ===
On 20 November 1979, a Saudi Arabian Islamic zealot group led a takeover of the Mosque in Mecca. The group's demands included calling for the cutoff of oil exports to the United States and the expulsion of all foreign civilian and military experts from the Arabian Peninsula. However, there was confusion over who had perpetrated the attack, and Iran's Supreme Leader Ayatollah Khomeini accused the United States and Israel. This claim was repeated in media reports the morning of 21 November. It was fueled by Voice of America reports that President Jimmy Carter had sent U.S. Navy aircraft carriers to the Indian Ocean in response to the ongoing Iran hostage crisis.

== Events ==
=== Arrival of demonstrators ===
The seizure was mostly planned by students at Quaid-i-Azam University, where the Islamist party Jamaat-e-Islami had recently won elections for the student body. The protesters shouted anti-American slogans. At first glance the event seemed to be a small protest outside the embassy's walls. Later, buses filled with Jamaat-i-Islami supporters arrived at the main gate. Hundreds of people began climbing over the walls and trying to pull the walls down using ropes. According to the staff at the neighboring British High Commission there were as many as 1,500 demonstrators.

Pakistani police tried to disperse the protesters by firing into them. According to reports, two protesters were killed and 70 injured.

=== Outbreak of violence ===
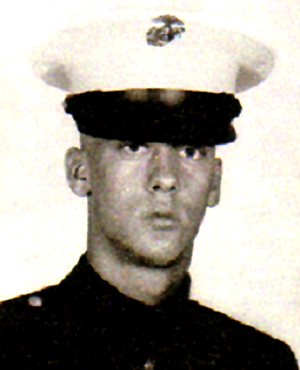
Corporal Steven Crowley, a Marine Security Guard, was shot and killed.

According to an American investigation, the protesters, believing that an American Marine on the roof of the embassy had fired first, opened fire after a bullet fired at the gate's lock by one rioter ricocheted and struck other protesters. Twenty-year-old Marine Corporal Steve Crowley was mortally wounded by a bullet and transported to the embassy's secure communication vault along with the rest of personnel serving in the embassy, including undercover CIA officer Gary Schroen. The rioters breached the compound and set fire to the lower floors of the chancery with Molotov cocktails. Although the Marines used tear gas against the protestors, embassy officials denied them permission to use lethal force. Several American civilians were taken hostage in the embassy residences by the rioters, while U.S. Army warrant officer Brian Ellis was killed. The rioters intended to take these hostages back to campus for a sham trial for espionage, but they were rescued by Pakistani police.

Pakistani soldiers rescued nearly 100 people who were trapped in the embassy vault for five hours. The vault had access to the roof. Initial reports said Pakistani forces landed helicopters on the roof, pushed back the protesters and rescued the US embassy staff. Deputy Chief of Mission Barrington King stated the helicopters did not land due to smoke and threat from the rioters. Political Councilor Herbert Hagerty, the senior officer trapped in the vault, said they heard a helicopter but no helo landed. Hagerty later recalled that rioters dispersed after the Pakistani army arrived and the vault personnel escaped by opening the roof hatch, then jumping from the roof onto the adjoining auditorium roof.

Locked behind steel-reinforced doors, the Americans waited for help to come and rescue them from the smoke-filled building. During the wait the rioters attempted to break in and shot at them through the ventilation shafts. After nightfall a Marine unit was able to sneak out a back exit from the vault as the front door was too damaged to open. Finding the embassy empty they led the rest of the 140 people from the vault out into the courtyard.

== Aftermath ==
After the attack, nonessential embassy personnel were evacuated back to the United States. Ayatollah Khomeini praised the attack, while Zia-ul-Haq condemned it in a televised address, stating "I understand that the anger and grief over this incident were quite natural, but the way in which they were expressed is not in keeping with the lofty Islamic traditions of discipline and forbearance."

== In popular culture ==
The attack is covered in the Pulitzer Prize-winning nonfiction books Ghost Wars by Steve Coll (in detail) and The Looming Tower by Lawrence Wright (to a lesser extent).

== See also ==
- Attacks on the United States
- 2012 Benghazi attack on U.S Consulate
- United States Embassy siege in Tehran
- 1983 Beirut barracks bombing
- Anti-Americanism
- Pakistan–United States relations
- Attacks on U.S consulate in Karachi
- Grand Mosque seizure
