= Consulate General of the United States, Karachi =

American consulate in Karachi, Pakistan

Consulate of the United States, Karachi
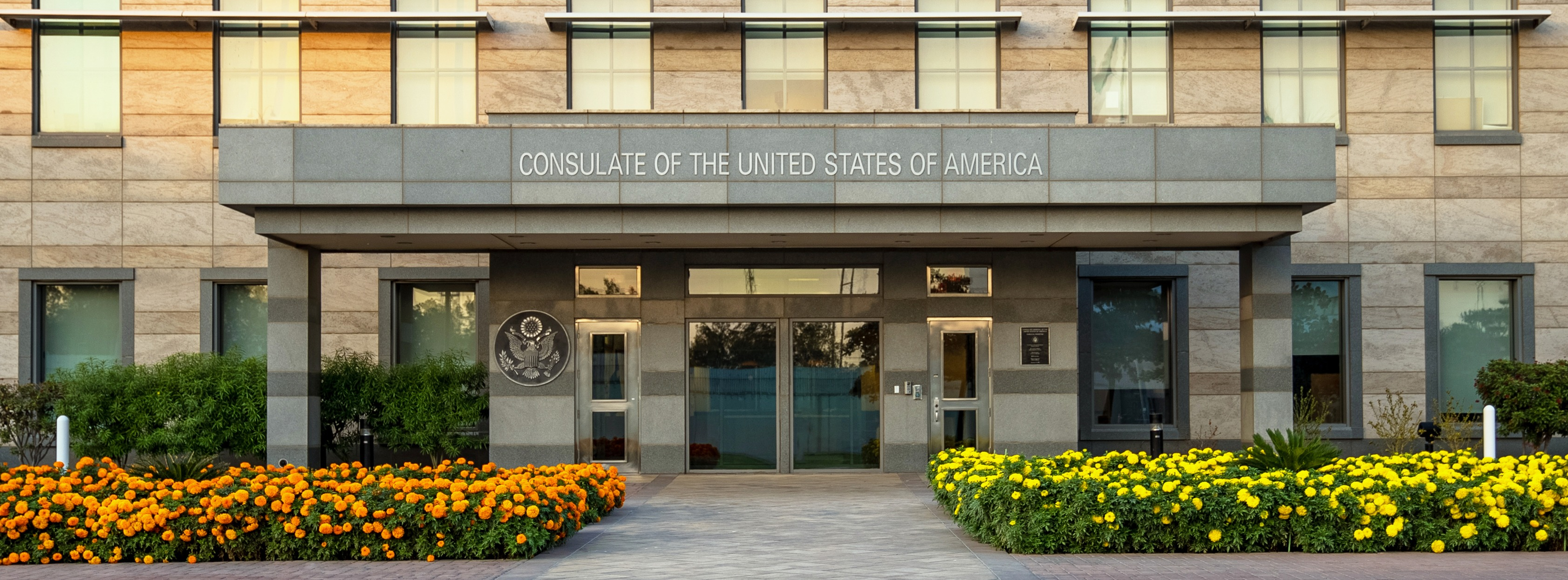
- Location: Karachi, Pakistan
- Address: Mai Kolachi Bypass, Intelligence Colony, Karachi, Sindh, Pakistan
- Coordinates: 24.841792°N 67.009079°E
- Opened: August 1, 2019
- Jurisdiction: Sindh Province
- Consul General: Scott Urbom
- Website: pk.usembassy.gov/embassy-consulates/karachi/

The Consulate General of the United States in Karachi (Note: Urdu: امریکی قونصل خانہ، کراچی; Sindhi: آمريڪي قونصل خانو، ڪراچي) is the consulate established by the United States in Karachi.

It is the United States' largest Consulate General, and is larger, in terms of both personnel and facilities, than many U.S. Embassies. It is technically a part of Mission Pakistan, and reports through the Embassy of the United States in Islamabad.

== History ==
The international, historical, and cultural bilateral relationship between the Islamic Republic of Pakistan and the United States of America. Roughly two months of its independence after the departure of the subcontinent by Great Britain, the United States established relations with Pakistan on October 20, 1947.

The consulate was formerly the embassy of United States built in 1955. The Karachi CG operates with a significant degree of autonomy when compared to other U.S. Consulates. This is due in part to several large U.S. government regional centers housed within the consulate, which provide support in the areas of security, construction, and financial matters to a number of other U.S Diplomatic posts located throughout Asia.

== Location ==
Previously the consulate was located at Abdullaha Haroon Road near Karachi Marriott Hotel. Due to security reasons US government purchased 20 acres of land from the Karachi Port Trust in 2005 and ground breaking took place in May 2008. After two years of construction work consulate shifted to the bigger place located at New TPX Area, Mai Kolachi Road.

== Consul General ==
Scott Urbom is currently serving as Consul General of Consulate General of the United States in Karachi.

== Attacks ==
There have been a series of attacks on the U.S. consulate in Karachi, Pakistan particularly during the start of the war on terrorism. The US consulate has been described as a tempting target for terrorism.

=== March 1995 attack ===
Two gunmen targeted a 20-seater passenger bus attached to the consulate with AK-47 rifles. Two personnel, Jacqueline Van Landingham, a CIA attaché, and Gary Durell were killed. Another U.S. citizen, Mark McCloy, a consulate spouse and the driver of the van, was injured in the attack. Durell and Van Landingham are commemorated in the compound's memorial garden.

=== June 2002 attack ===
On the morning of June 14, 2002, a truck with a fertilizer bomb driven by a suicide bomber was detonated outside the United States Consulate in Karachi, Pakistan. Twelve people were killed and 51 injured, all Pakistanis.

A group called al-Qanoon claimed responsibility for the attack. However, the incident is believed to have been connected with al-Qaeda and the US war on terror although no conclusive links were proven. Several people were arrested in the aftermath of the attack, and were reported to be members of Harkat-ul-Mujahideen, a large insurgent organisation. In November 2004, the alleged mastermind of the attack, Naveed-ul Hassan, was arrested in Pakistan.

=== February 2003 shooting ===
On February 28, 2003, gunmen killed two police officers and wounded five other officers and a civilian in front of the consulate. The attack was conducted from motorcycles, and was deliberately aimed at the paramilitary rangers who have taken over guard duties at the consulate from the Pakistani police.

=== March 2004 bomb plot ===
On March 15, 2004, there was another attempt to blow up a van in front of the consulate. A grey van was stolen the day before after the driver was shot in the leg. The same van with different plates was later found parked in front of the US Consulate at 7:15 am. When the driver of the parked van was questioned by the police, he claimed that the van had broken down. Soon after, the man was picked up by another car. The police investigated the van and discovered a large blue tank filled with nearly 200 gallons of liquid explosives hooked up to a timer and two detonators. The device was deactivated.

=== March 2006 bombing ===
On March 2, 2006, a suicide car bomb killed four people and injured thirty outside the Marriott Hotel in Karachi, which is about 20 yards from the consulate. Among the dead was David Foy, an American diplomat and three Pakistanis. It appears that Foy was the direct target of the bomber, who detonated his vehicle in the car park behind the consulate as Foy arrived. The bomb was reported to be the most powerful attack of its kind in Karachi, and it left a two-metre crater in the car park and destroyed at least ten nearby cars.

=== March 2026 attack ===
On 1 March 2026, the Consulate General of the United States in Karachi, Pakistan, was targeted by Shia Muslim protesters following strikes on Iran by the US and Israel in which Iranian supreme leader Ayatollah Ali Khamenei was assassinated. As the protesters assaulted the consulate and breached the outer wall, the Marine Security Guards opened fire, killing 10 protesters and injuring over 60.

Protesters set fire and broke windows during the attack. They attempted to enter the consulate and threw stones at constables and Rangers, who responded by pushing them back. At one point, a protester opened fire with a pistol. The police dispersed crowds with tear gas near Mai Kolachi Road, while protesters continued to throw stones along M. T. Khan Road. Additionally, a traffic police post beneath the Sultanabad Bridge was set on fire.

Several roads, including those leading to Namish Chowrangi and from Sultanabad to Mai Kolachi, were closed. Traffic from Jinnah Bridge was redirected to I. I. Chundrigar Road, and vehicles coming from Boat Basin were forced to make a U-turn at Mai Kolachi Phatak.

== See also ==
- Embassy of the United States, Islamabad
- Consulate General of the United States, Lahore
- Consulate General of the United States, Peshawar
- Americans in Pakistan
- Pakistan–United States relations
- 1979 U.S. embassy burning in Islamabad
- List of diplomatic missions in Karachi
- 2010 Peshawar bombing (disambiguation)
