= CIA activities in Pakistan =

Central Intelligence Agency

This is a list of activities ostensibly carried out by the U.S. Central Intelligence Agency (CIA) within Pakistan. It has been alleged by such authors as Ahmed Rashid that the CIA and ISI (Inter-Services Intelligence; Pakistan's premier intelligence agency) have been waging a clandestine war. The Afghan Taliban—with whom the United States was officially in conflict—was headquartered in Pakistan's Federally Administered Tribal Areas during the war and according to some reports was largely funded by the ISI. The Pakistani government denied this.

== 2005 ==
On May 15, 2005, it was reported that Predator drones had been used to kill Al-Qaeda figure Haitham al-Yemeni in a targeted killing inside Pakistan.

== 2006 ==
On January 13, 2006, the CIA launched an airstrike on Damadola, a Pakistani village near the Afghan border, where they believed Ayman al-Zawahiri was located. The airstrike killed a number of civilians but al-Zawahiri apparently was not among them. The Pakistani government issued a strong protest against the US attack, considered a violation of Pakistan's sovereignty. However, several legal experts argue that this cannot be considered an assassination attempt as al-Zawahiri is named as terrorist and an enemy combatant by the United States, and therefore this targeted killing is not covered under Executive Order 12333, which banned assassinations. However this still remains a violation of sovereignty of Pakistan according to international law.

== 2007 ==
A new National Intelligence Estimate (NIE) focused on three years, The Terrorist Threat to the US Homeland, says "Al Qaeda has reorganized to pre-9/11 strength and is preparing for a major US strike has sparked debate among government officials and observers about the Bush administration's foreign policy and counterterrorism efforts." It "indicates that the Islamic terrorist organization's rise has been bolstered by the Iraq war and the failure to counter extremism in Pakistan's tribal areas.

== 2008 ==
Operation Cannonball, a CIA operation, was disclosed in 2008. Began in 2006, it was intended as part of an effort to capture Osama bin Laden and eliminate Al-Qaeda forces in Pakistan. The operation was reportedly hampered by conflicts between CIA offices, leading to large delays in the deployment of the program.

In July 2008, CIA officials confronted Pakistan officials with evidence of ties between Inter-Services Intelligence and Jalaluddin Haqqani. ISI denies this report.

== 2010 CIA station chief removal in Pakistan ==
On December 16, 2010, the CIA evacuated its station chief, later named as Jonathan Bank, from Pakistan after his cover was blown in legal action brought by relatives of a person killed in a 31 December 2009 drone attack, for which the station chief was accused of being responsible. The CIA, in a rare move, recalled the station chief, citing "security concerns" and concerns about his safety. Neither the CIA nor the US government officially recognise station chiefs, but they are acknowledged to exist by intelligence organizations. In April 2015, the Islamabad High Court ordered police to open a criminal case against Bank for murder, conspiracy, terrorism and waging war against Pakistan.

== Fake hepatitis vaccination campaign ==
Towards the end of the manhunt for Osama bin Laden and leading up to his eventual death in 2011, the CIA ran a covert operation utilizing a fake hepatitis vaccine program in Pakistan to illicitly collect blood samples to confirm the presence of bin Laden or his family. The program was ultimately unsuccessful, and lead to a rise in vaccine hesitancy and eventual re-emergence of polio in Pakistan.

== 2011 ==
In January 2011 CIA contractor Raymond Allen Davis fatally shot dead two young men on the streets of Lahore, Punjab after on claims that he was defending himself. His status as a CIA contractor was discovered after he was arrested by Punjab police and charged with 2 counts of murder and the possession of illegal firearms. In the same situation another USA team of four people riding an SUV crushed a motor cyclist and killed him before running away back to the USA consulate. It is alleged that all four people left Pakistan in the evening on special flight. These four people are still at large.

General Ahmad Shuja Pasha, emerged as fiercely hostile to Washington in his final year engaging in “shouting matches” with then CIA director Leon Panetta, cutting cooperation down to a minimum, ordering the harassment of U.S. diplomats in Pakistan and locking up CIA blackwater and agent Shakil Afridi in Pakistan.

== 2012 ==
Shakil Afridi, a Pakistani doctor who spied for the CIA to locate Osama bin Laden, was jailed for 33 years by a Pakistani court on charges of treason.

== 2019 ==
Lt. General Javed Iqbal (Retd) and Brigadier Wasim Akram (Retd) were imprisoned for 14 years and sentenced to death respectively, on charges of spying for CIA on Pakistan's nuclear program.

== See also ==
- Death of Osama bin Laden
- Milton Bearden - CIA station chief in Pakistan, 1986-1989
- Inter-Services Intelligence activities in the United States
