= Reactions to the 2014 Peshawar school massacre =

The response to the 2014 Peshawar school massacre, that occurred on 16 December 2014 was widespread. The attack occurred at the Army Public School in the Pakistani city of Peshawar, killed a total of 145 people which included 132 school children and ten school staff members.

The attack prompted a massive response both on local and international level. Pakistani reaction included both strong condemnations and promises of retaliation against the perpetrators. International reaction was swift and widespread, with many countries condemning the attack and expressing their condolences to the victims.

== Pakistan ==
=== Government ===
I have decided to proceed to Peshawar and I will supervise the operation myself. These are my children and it is my loss.

— Nawaz Sharif, Prime Minister of Pakistan

Prime Minister Nawaz Sharif had condemned the attack, calling it a national tragedy. Nawaz Sharif left for Peshawar to monitor the operation and announced a three-day mourning period during which the National Flag would fly at half mast. On 17 December 2014, Sharif approved paperwork to remove a moratorium on the death penalty in terror-related cases.

President Mamnoon Hussain condemned the attack, saying "such cowardly attacks cannot deter the morale and resolve of the Nation."

Chief Minister of the Province of Punjab, Shehbaz Sharif, condemned the attack, saying "The incident of terrorism is highly condemnable and 180 million people of the country are shocked and grieved over the tragic incident." The Chief Minister appealed to Imran Khan, Maulana Fazal-ur-Rehman, Altaf Hussain, Asfandyar Wali Khan, Mahmood Khan Achakzai, Maulana Samiul Haq, Siraj Ul Haq, leaders of all political and religious parties and civil society to be united for the sake of Pakistan.

=== Political entities ===
Major political entities denounced the attack and heavily condemned the attack on innocent children, calling for a strong reaction against militants.

Pakistan Tehreek-e-Insaf leader Imran Khan condemned the attack and announced the end of the protest Azadi March.

Muttahida Qaumi Movement leader Altaf Hussain, Jamiat Ulema e Islam leader Maulana Fazal-ur-Rehman, Jamaat-e-Islami Pakistan leader Siraj-ul-Haq Khan, Pakistan Awami Tehrik leader Tahirul Qadri condemned the attack.

=== Religious entities ===
Abdul Aziz Ghazi, the head cleric of Lal Masjid in Islamabad received huge backlash after he refused to condemn the attack. A large number of protesters gathered outside the mosque demanding his arrest. Police were deployed outside the mosque to prevent clashes. In reaction, the mosque management registered a FIR against protesters after which police made some arrests. On 21 December, a FIR was launched against Abdul Aziz.

The vice chancellor of Darul Uloom Deoband issued a statement condemning the attack on APS Peshawar. He stated that it is totally un-Islamic.

Islamic scholar Maulana Tariq Jameel condemned the attack, saying "the attack against innocent people is barbaric and must be condemned in no uncertain terms".

==== Others ====
Nobel Peace Prize winner Malala Yousafzai condemned the attack, saying in a statement: "I am heartbroken by this senseless and cold-blooded act of terror in Peshawar that is unfolding before us". Her father, Ziauddin Yousafzai, said his "heart is bleeding" and his family in "traumatized" over Peshawar school massacre.

Queen Elizabeth II condemned the Peshawar attack saying "deepest sympathies from me and from those of the people of United Kingdom to all those affected by the tragic event in Peshawar."

== International reactions ==
International reaction for the attack was widespread, with many countries and international organisations condemning the attack and expressing their condolences to the families of victims. Many important personalities around the world also condemned the attack.

=== Supranational ===
European Union — Federica Mogherini the High Representative of the Union for Foreign Affairs and Security Policy in a statement condemned the attack saying "I wish to express my heartfelt condolences to the families of the victims and my support to the people and the authorities of Pakistan on this tragic day."

Cooperation Council for the Arab States of the Gulf — Secretary general Abdullatif bin Rashid Al Zayani, on behalf of the GCC states, strongly condemned the attack saying that its perpetrators "were stripped out of all human sentiments" and expressed his condolences to the families of the victims and the Pakistani Government wishing the injured a speedy recovery.

Organisation of Islamic Cooperation — Secretary General Iyad bin Amin Madani issued a press release condemning the attack calling it "horrific and senseless terrorist attack". Madani offered solidarity and condolences to the Government and people of Pakistan. He said that "the OIC’s principled position denouncing all acts of terrorism no matter what the justifications are."

United Nations — Secretary-General Ban Ki-moon condemned the attack saying "An act of horror and rank cowardice to attack defenceless children while they learn. No cause can justify such brutality. No grievance can excuse such horror. Getting an education is every child's right. Going to school should not have to be an act of bravery." United Nations representative in Pakistan Timo Pakkala in a statement said it is "appalled by this act of cruelty and brutality. Attacking children and children’s education is a disregard of the most fundamental principles of humanity and we reaffirm our strongest commitment to protecting children’s rights." Prince Zeid bin Ra'ad United Nations High Commissioner for Human Rights said "Nowhere in the world should it be an act of bravery for a child to attend school. Yet, in parts of Pakistan, Afghanistan and Nigeria simply showing up at school takes tremendous courage and determination. In recent years, my staff have been receiving increasing frequent reports in these three countries of schools being destroyed or closed because of militants' threats, and of schoolchildren – especially girls – being kidnapped, shot, attacked with acid or poisoned by groups whose ideology bears no resemblance to any religion or any cultural norm."

=== State governments ===
==== Asia ====
Afghanistan — President Ashraf Ghani condemned the attack and said "The killing of innocent children is contrary to Islam." "We share the pains and sufferings of Pakistan's people, and condemn in strongest possible terms this terrorist, brutal, non-Islamic and inhuman act." Ghani said over telephonic conversation with Pakistani Prime Minister Nawaz Sharif.

Azerbaijan — Ministry of Foreign Affairs in a press statement condemned the attack saying "Azerbaijan expressed its heartfelt condolences and sympathy to the bereaved families and the brotherly people of Pakistan and wished the many injured a speedy recovery. Azerbaijan, as a victim of terrorism, condemns terrorism in all forms and reiterates that there is no justification for terrorism at all." Azerbaijani Ambassador to Pakistan Dakshin Shikarov said "More than hundred Innocent children and teachers became the victims of this brutal act. We share the pain of those who lost their beloveds and express our deepest condolences. We pray to Allah Almighty to rest the departed souls in eternal peace. Aamin."

Bahrain — Ministry of Foreign Affairs released a press release to condemn the attack. "Kingdom of Bahrain affirmed full support to Pakistan in confronting and defeating terrorist groups, and offered condolences to the Pakistani Government, people and relatives of the victims of the barbaric act." the press release said.

Bangladesh — Prime Minister Sheikh Hasina in a statement said "People across the world are stunned and shocked by this barbaric and heinous massacre."

Brunei — The people of Brunei have express their condolences with the Pakistan High Commission in the country organised a Qur'an recital and prayers for the victims along with a three days mourning.

China — Foreign Ministry spokesman Qin Gang in a statement said "We are deeply shocked and grieved by the attack and condemn in the strongest terms the terrorists. China will continue to firmly support the unremitting Pakistani efforts to fight terrorism, safeguard national stability and save people's lives." Chinese President Xi Jinping and Premier Li Keqiang both sent separate messages of condolences to the Pakistani leaders. President Xi said that he was shocked to learn about the serious terrorist attack. On behalf of the Chinese government and people and in his own name, Xi deeply mourned the victims and conveyed heartfelt sympathy to the injured and the bereaved families. Both messages stressed that the Chinese side opposes all forms of terrorism and strongly condemns the inhumane terrorist attack, that the thoughts of the Chinese people are with the Pakistani people, and that China firmly supports the counter-terrorism efforts by the Pakistani Government. China's Ambassador to Pakistan Sun Weidong condemned the attack and reiterated "Chinese cooperation and firm support for eliminating the menace of terrorism from the country." The ambassador also presented the Special Assistant to the Prime Minister with condolence letters from President Xi, Premier Li and Foreign Minister Wang Yi to their respective Pakistani counterparts. Ambassador Sun also presented a cheque of $50,000 for the victims of the attack, on behalf of the Chinese Embassy in Islamabad. China, as part of the rehabilitation programme, later invited school students to participate in a recreational tour to China.

Cyprus – The Foreign Ministry condemned the attack, issued a statement quoting the Foreign Minister which reads "We are shocked at the heinous terrorist attack on a public school in Peshawar of Pakistan that resulted in the deaths of dozens of innocent children. we strongly condemn inhumane attacks on innocent students and educators and we express our deep condolences to the families of the victims and our support for the people and the Government of Pakistan."

India — In the aftermath of the attack, there was an outpouring of solidarity in India with the hashtag #IndiaWithPakistan trending on Twitter.

- Prime Minister Narendra Modi condemned the attack. "It is a senseless act of unspeakable brutality that has claimed lives of the most innocent of human beings| young children in their school." Modi said on his Twitter account. "My heart goes out to everyone who lost their loved ones today. We share their pain & offer our deepest condolences."
- President Pranab Mukherjee in a message said "Such heinous acts are against all tenets of humanity. They are nothing but a manifestation of the extreme evil that terrorists are capable of. The world community must unite and redouble efforts to root out terrors from every country and society."
- Minister for Home Affairs Rajnath Singh issued a statement to express his condolence to the families and said "I strongly condemn the terrorist attack on a school at Peshawar (Pakistan). This dastardly and inhuman attack exposes the real face of terrorism. My heart goes out to the families of those children who were killed by the terrorists in Peshawar."
- Indian Foreign Ministry spokesman Syed Akbaruddin tweeted, "We condemn the horrific attack on innocent school children in Peshawar. Our hearts go out to the grief stricken families of the innocent children killed & injured in this barbaric attack in Peshawar. Feeling of deep revulsion & horror about this terror attack against innocent children."
- Chief Minister of Jammu and Kashmir Omar Abdullah in a tweet said "Inhuman and "barbaric words were not enough to describe the perpetrators. What terrible, heart breaking images of the attack in #Peshawar. Inhuman and barbaric don't even begin to describe the perpetrators."
- Congress vice president Rahul Gandhi commented "We stand united with the people of Pakistan in their resolve to fight the menace of terrorism."
- Finance Minister Arun Jaitley, Defence Minister Manohar Parrikar, Chief Ministers of Madhya Pradesh Shivraj Singh Chouhan, Rajasthan Vasundhara Raje and Gujarat Anandiben Patel also condemned the attack and offered condolences. Lok Sabha, the lower house of Indian parliament, as well schools across India observed a two-minute silence and held special prayers to remember the victims. The hashtag #IndiaWithPakistan was trending on Twitter following the attack.

Indonesia — Ministry of Foreign Affairs in a statement called the attack "an inhuman act" that could not be tolerated for any reason and offered condolences and on behalf of the Indonesian government expressed its support and solidarity for the people and Government of Pakistan.

Iran — President Hassan Rouhani condemned the attack and sent condolences to families of victims. Foreign Ministry spokeswoman Marziyeh Afkham in a press conference said "This is a totally un-Islamic and inhumane action," adding that terrorism, extremism and putting innocent people's lives at risk in any form and with any purpose are reprehensible. Afkham further said cooperation among the regional countries and the world community is necessary in order to fight terrorism and extremism.

Japan — Chief Cabinet Secretary Yoshihide Suga on behalf of Japanese government condemned the attack and called it "unforgivable". "We are in deep shock and sorrow. Our country strongly condemns any form of terrorism, and this one is especially unforgivable, as it targeted students who hold the future in their hands. " He said.

Jordan — Queen Rania expressed her grief over attack saying "Till when will innocent children pay the horrific price of extremism." The Queen later also published a piece dedicated to the victims on her Huffington Post blog. The State Minister for Media Affairs, Mohammad al-Momani, offered the Jordanian people's heartfelt condolences to the people of Pakistan and described the attack as horrendous and criminal act that has nothing to do with Islam. He further said Jordan will always stand against and continue its fight against terrorism and those who target civilians. King Abdullah II sent a cable to the President of Pakistan, offering his condolences. The king also condemned such criminal action, expressing his deep sorrow and heartfelt condolences for the victims.

Kazakhstan — Ministry of Foreign Affairs condemned the attack and release a press statement saying "We express our deep condolences to the Government of Pakistan, the families and close ones of those who perished and wish speedy recovery to all injured during the terrorist attack. The killing of innocent children and teachers causes special indignation and revulsion and shows the utmost inhuman nature of terrorists."

Kuwait — National Assembly of Kuwait Speaker Marzouq Al-Ghanim met with Sardar Ayaz Sadiq, speaker of the National Assembly of Pakistan in Kuwait and condemned the attack on behalf of Government of Kuwait. Al-Ghanim offered condolences to families of victims and expressed solidarity.

Lebanon — Saad Hariri, former Prime Minister condemned the attack on behalf of Lebanese government saying "We strongly condemn the terrorist attack that targeted students at a school in the Peshawar area of Pakistan yesterday."

Malaysia — Ministry of Foreign Affairs on a statement said "Malaysia strongly condemns the attack that resulted in the loss of 141 lives including 132 school children and wounded dozens of other students and educators. The senseless killing and attack on school children by the perpetrators, for whatever reason, is uncalled for and inhumane in nature....We are ready to support Pakistan in their peace building efforts as Malaysia continues to promote the moderation agenda and mediation approach". Prime Minister Najib Razak together with Foreign Affairs Minister Anifah Aman has express their condolence and sympathies to the Government and people of Pakistan, as well as to the bereaved families of the victims of the attack.

Maldives — President Abdulla Yameen send two condolence letters to Pakistani Prime Minister Nawaz Sharif, mentioning "Maldives commitment to fight against the global menace of terrorism and conveyed that Maldives would continue to work closely with Pakistan and the international community as a whole in eliminating this scourge of terrorism." Foreign Minister Dunya Maumoon condmend the attack and said "It was with deep shock and profound sadness that I learnt of the inhumane and brutal terrorist attacks at a school in Peshawar, which has caused the loss of many innocent lives and injury to many others, most of whom are children. At this time of national tragedy, the Government and the people of Maldives join me in extending heartfelt condolences to the Government and the people of Pakistan, and especially to the members of the bereaved families. May Allah give us all strength and fortitude during this time of heartache and grief".

Nepal — Ministry of Foreign Affairs issued a press release saying "At this hour of grief, the government of Nepal extends heartfelt condolences and sympathies to the Government of the Islamic Republic of Pakistan and through them to the bereaved families and prays for the speedy recovery of those injured."

Oman — Ministry of Foreign Affairs condemned the attack and release a press release saying "The government of the Sultanate of Oman condemns the terrorist attack that was carried out by Pakistani Taliban which targeted children's school in the city of Peshawar in the Islamic Republic of Pakistan and resulted in a number of deaths and wounded innocent children and teachers. The Sultanate's government stands by the Government and people of the Islamic Republic of Pakistan and support their efforts to fight terrorism so as to enhance the security and stability in this friend country and the region."

Philippines — President Benigno Aquino in a statement condemned the attacked and said "Today, we join the world in condemning the outrage perpetrated on innocent schoolchildren, and school officials and personnel in Peshawar, Pakistan. In this moment of grief and sadness for the people of Pakistan, the Filipino people are one with them in mourning. Today, every person of goodwill is a father, mother, brother, and sister to the people of Pakistan."

Saudi Arabia — King Abdullah condemned the attack saying "We have heard about the news of this terrorist attack with profound pain and grief." Grand Mufti Abdul-Aziz ibn Abdullah Al ash-Sheikh condemned the attack describing it as "corruption, injustice and aggression." He further added that "It’s appalling to see many people being killed in Muslim countries these days and this should wake up Muslims as it’s a dangerous action and a big crime."

Singapore — Ministry of Foreign Affairs released a press statement in which they condemned the attack. "Singapore strongly condemns the attack on the Army Public School in Peshawar, Pakistan. This is a heinous crime. We are deeply saddened by the tragic loss of so many innocent lives and the large number of people injured. We express our deepest condolences and sympathy to the families of the victims and the people of Pakistan." the statement reads.

South Korea — Ministry of Foreign Affairs condemned the attack and release a press release which reads " The Government of the Republic of Korea cannot but be shocked and outraged over the terrorist attack on the Army Public School in Peshawar in northwestern Pakistan on December 16 that left a large number of people, including school children, killed or injured. The ROK government prays for the repose of the innocent people killed in the attack and offers its deepest condolences and consolation to their bereaved families as well as the Pakistani people."

Sri Lanka — President Mahinda Rajapaksa condemned the attack. "Horrified to learn of the Peshawar terrorist attack. Targeting of children is most cowardice. Our thoughts & prayers are with Pakistan." Rajapaksa said on his Twitter account.

Syria — Speaker of the People's Assembly Mohammed Jihad Al-Laham stated "We assert standing by the Pakistani people, Government and leadership in combating terrorism which is targeting lives, civilization and noble values that have brought our peoples together, and we surely support Pakistan's deterrent procedures against the expansion of terrorism which is supported by well-known states in the Middle East and the colonial West,"; Al-Laham also added " we in the People’s Assembly express our sympathy and solidarity with you during this hard time, wishing the injured a swift recovery and hoping that Pakistan will eradicate terrorism soon so that Pakistani people can live in peace." The Syrian Foreign Ministry voiced "Syria's deep condolences to the families of the victims and sympathy with the friendly people and Government of Pakistan."

Thailand — Prime Minister General Prayut Chan-o-cha condemn the attack and send condolences to families of victims. "I have learnt with deepest shock and sorrow of the attack at the Army Public School in Peshawar, Pakistan, on 16 December 2014, which claimed the lives of innocent schoolchildren and teachers. On behalf of the Government and the people of Thailand, I wish to extend my deepest sympathy and condolences to Your Excellency and, through you, to the grieving families who lost loved ones as a result of this barbaric and unjustifiable act. Thailand condemns this senseless act of terror and shares with our friends in Pakistan in the sense of profound grief and loss." he said. Foreign Minister Tanasak Patimapragorn also condemned the attack.

Tajikistan — President Emomali Rahmon condemned the attack and sent a condolence letter to Pakistan Prime Minister Nawaz Sharif which reads "Deeply convinced that this terrible event, which once again has shown the world community cowardly face of international terrorism, strengthens our will to continue the relentless fight against this shameful phenomenon of the century and will give impetus to international cooperation in preventing violence and extremism."

Turkey — President Recep Tayyip Erdoğan and Prime Minister Ahmet Davutoğlu condemned the attack and announced a day of national mourning in Turkey. Foreign Ministry issued a statement which reads "The attack in Peshawar, which aimed at disrupting the country's domestic peace and security, caused deep sadness in Turkey. Turkey is determined to continue its solidarity with the Pakistani Government and its people and will continue supporting Pakistan's fight against terrorism."

United Arab Emirates — Crown Prince of Abu Dhabi Mohammed bin Zayed Al Nahyan condemned the attack on behalf of Government of United Arab Emirates saying "In this painful and difficult moment, we stand by Pakistan and its people in the face of this blind extremism and criminal terrorism and ask the Allah the Almighty to bless the young and innocent victims of heinous malice, perpetual hatred and dark violence. As we pray for the souls of innocent children, we ask Allah the Almighty to grant solace and strength to their parents, families and to the people of friendly Pakistan."

Vietnam — Prime Minister, Foreign Minister condemned the attack and sent condolence messages to Pakistan. Foreign Ministry issued a statement which reads "Vietnam conveys deep condolences and sympathy to the government and people of Pakistan, the families of victims and believes that the instigators will be punished appropriately soon."

==== Africa ====
Algeria — Spokesman of Ministry of Foreign Affairs in a press statement condemned the attack and said "We express our indignation at this heinous and barbaric crime, which cannot be justified under any circumstances. The horror endured by these innocent victims reflects the blind and inhuman assailants and their sponsors. We extend our sympathy with the victims' families and solidarity with the Government of Pakistan."

Egypt — The Egyptian ministry of foreign affairs spokesman Badr Abdelatty said that the Egyptian government condemns the attack and gives its condolences to Pakistanis and the families of the victims. He stressed the importance of "international collaboration to counter-terrorism, as it is considered a global phenomenon targeting security and stability all over the world".

Kenya — Ministry of Foreign Affairs on behalf of Government of Kenya condemned the attack in a press statement. "We pray for the families and people of Pakistan and strongly condemn the senseless act of unspeakable brutality. Our hearts go out to grief stricken families of innocent kids killed and injured in this terrible attack in Peshawar." cabinet secretary Ambassador Amina Mohammed said.

Morocco — King Muhammad condemned the attack saying "I was appalled and deeply saddened by the news of the horrific terrorist attack on a school in Peshawar which caused a large number of casualties, most of them innocent children. In my capacity as Commander of the Faithful, and in keeping with my responsibilities at the Organization of Islamic Cooperation, I strongly condemn all forms of terrorism, which is totally incompatible with our pristine Islamic faith, the revealed religions and human principles and democratic values which make the right to life the foremost human right on earth."

Nigeria — President Goodluck Jonathan condemned the attack and offered condolences to Pakistani people and Government. "The president wholly condemns the brutal, savage, senseless and totally unjustifiable killing of innocent students and staff during the attack," the statement said.

South Africa — Department of International Relations and Cooperation spokesman Clayson Monyela in a press release condemn the attack saying "The South African Government has today... joined the international community in condemning in the strongest possible terms the inhumane and barbaric terrorist attack against a school in the city of Peshawar."

Tunisia — Caretaker President of Tunisia Moncef Marzouki condemned the attack calling it a "heinous crime" and offered condolences.

==== Europe ====
Albania — Ministry of Foreign Affairs issued a press release to condemn the attack. "The Albanian MFA extends its sincere condolences to the families of the victims and to all persons affected by this tragedy of active terrorism, expresses its sincere support to the Pakistani authorities in facing this new situation and hopes for the rapid healing of the wounded persons."

Andorra — Ministry of Foreign Affairs on behalf of the Government and people of Andorra, expressed it condolences with the families of victims.

Austria — Foreign Minister Sebastian Kurz in a tweet condemned the attack saying "Such horrible acts can never be justified" and sent condolence to families of the victims.

Belgium — Foreign Minister Didier Reynders strongly condemned the attack and offered condolences to victims saying "These are acts of utmost cruelty that touch the core of a society and negate the most basic human rights. Radicalisation and extremism always lead to destruction and loss of life. It is international diplomacy's duty to promote moderation, prevent radicalisation and fight impunity through respect of international humanitarian and human rights law. This endeavour is at the core of Belgium's foreign policy."

Bulgaria — Ministry of Foreign Affairs condemned the attack and issued a statement saying "We reaffirm our strong support of the efforts of the international community for eradication of all forms of terrorism and remain committed to the furthering of the EU-Pakistan counter-terrorism dialogue."

Denmark — Prime Minister Helle Thorning-Schmidt while speaking in parliament condemned the attack and said "It is a very serious situation. I am simply appalled that the Taliban can find to attack a school. Over 100 deaths are reported. It is heartbreaking and shows the evil Taliban stands for; and it stresses the importance of the fact that we are still fighting the Taliban, also in relation to what we do in Afghanistan."

France — President François Hollande in a statement condemned the attack saying "No words can express the ignominy of such an attack against children in their school and that France supported the Government of Pakistan in their fight against terrorism" and expressed solidarity with the victims and their parents."

Georgia — Ministry of Foreign Affairs condemned the attack in a press statement and said "We are shocked with the extent of the tragedy and barbarity committed by the terrorists, which is a grave crime against the entire civilized world. In this difficult moment we stand with the people of Pakistan and convey our condolences to the families of the terrorism victims."

Germany — Foreign Minister Frank-Walter Steinmeier in a statement condemned the attack saying "We mourn with the people of Pakistan, the victims of this bloody terrorist attack. Our heart goes out to the families of the victims".

Greece — Deputy Prime Minister and Foreign Minister Evangelos Venizelos condemned the attack in a press release and said "We are shocked at the incomprehensible, barbaric, inhuman terrorist attack of the Taliban of Pakistan on a school in the city of Peshawar; an attack that resulted in the deaths of dozens of innocent children. The fact that the terrorists targeted children is abhorrent, evoking rage at the craven killers who murdered defenseless children. We express our deep condolences to the families of the victims and our undivided support for the people and the Government of Pakistan."

Ireland — Minister of Foreign Affairs Charles Flanagan condemned the attack and said "I wholeheartedly condemn the tragic killing of school children and others in Pakistan today. This was an attack of savage brutality which targeted innocent children in their place of study. I wish to express my heartfelt condolences and those of the Irish people to the families of the victims and to the people and the authorities of Pakistan on this tragic day."

Italy — Prime Minister Matteo Renzi condemned the attack on his Twitter account, saying "Killing children at school is an inconceivable horror, the world must react to this violence."

Latvia — Ministry of Foreign Affairs in a press statement said "Latvia conveys its deepest condolences to Pakistan concerning the attack by a group of Taliban on a school in Peshawar in which both children and teachers were killed and injured. Latvia categorically condemns terrorism and violence. Latvia expresses heartfelt condolences to the families of the victims. On this tragic day, our feelings are with the people of Pakistan. Latvia supports the efforts of the Pakistani authorities that are aimed at ensuring peace and stability at home and in the region, and are based on national interests and international cooperation."

Lithuania — President Dalia Grybauskaite, in a condolence letter to the President of Pakistan, condemned the attack and expressed her solidarity to the people and Government of Pakistan and called "that who organized, participated or otherwise contributed to the attack that shocked the whole international community must be brought to justice."

Luxembourg — Prime Minister Xavier Bettel in a condolence letter to Pakistan Prime Minister Nawaz Sharif condemned the attack and expressed his solidarity to the people and Government of Pakistan.

Norway — Ministry of Foreign Affairs condemned the attack and issued a press release quoting Foreign Minister Børge Brende. "I condemn today’s terrorist attack on a school in Peshawar in the strongest possible terms. Targeting children and teachers in this manner is despicable." the release reads. King Harald V offered condolences to the Pakistani President in a message saying that "I was shocked and saddened by the tragic loss of so many young lives at the Army Public School in Peshawar. On behalf of myself and the Norwegian people, I extend to you, the families of the victims and to the people of Pakistan my condolences and deepest sympathy."

Poland — Ministry of Foreign Affairs issued a statement to condemn the attack. "We strongly denounce all acts of terrorism, the more so when they are targeted against children who are the most vulnerable and innocent. We hope that those responsible for this attack will be brought to justice and will be severely punished. We expressed our sincere condolences to the families and close ones of the victims of the attack in Peshawar and to the people of Pakistan] who can count on our solidarity in these difficult moments" the statement reads.

Romania — Foreign Affairs Minister Bogdan Aurescu described the attack as "a barbaric act" and called for those responsible to be brought to justice. He also sent condolences to the victims' families and expressed solidarity with the Pakistani people.

Russia — President Vladimir Putin condemned the attack and sent condolence message to Pakistani Prime Minister Nawaz Sharif. The Russian Foreign Ministry strongly condemned the attacks, and added: "We support the measures undertaken by the Government of Pakistan aimed at the extermination of the hotbeds of terrorism. We expect Pakistan to continue with its uncompromising struggle to eliminate the extremist infrastructure. Russia is ready to proceed with assisting the Pakistani Government in its efforts to fight terror."

Slovenia — Ministry of Foreign Affairs condemned the attack calling it "barbaric" and offered its since condolences to the victims and their families on behalf of people and government of Slovenia.

Spain — President of the Government Mariano Rajoy sent condolences to the Prime Minister of Pakistan in the name of the Spanish people: "I cannot imagine a more disgusting terrorist act on human dignity. My country has also known the indiscriminate pain and suffering of terrorism and violence. For this, you can count on my Government's full support and the firm commitment of Spain in the fight against this scourge."

United Kingdom — Prince Charles condemned the attack. British Prime Minister David Cameron condemned the attack and expressed deep shock at the tragedy. "The news from Pakistan is deeply shocking. It's horrifying that children are being killed simply for going to school." Cameron said on his Twitter account. Former Prime Minister Gordon Brown and leader of Labour Party Ed Miliband condemned the attack. Queen Elizabeth II condemned the attack saying "deepest sympathies from me and from those of the people of United Kingdom to all those affected by the tragic event in Peshawar."

Vatican City — Pope Francis in a gathering in St. Peter's Square condemned the attacks in Australia, Pakistan and Yemen. "I would like to pray together with you for the victims of the inhuman terrorist acts carried out in the past few days in Australia, Pakistan and Yemen. May God welcome the dead into his peace, comfort the families and convert the hearts of the violent ones, who do not even stop before children."

==== Oceania ====
Australia — Prime Minister Tony Abbott in a statement said "It is impossible to put into words the mixture of grief and fury that must be felt by people in Pakistan, and indeed around the world, at this latest terrorist atrocity in Peshawar. What struck that school was an act of cowardice and depravity beyond measure. It is an unspeakable tragedy, and Australia condemns this horrific act of violence." Minister for Foreign Affairs Julie Bishop issued an official statement saying that Australia and Pakistan "share a common sense of grief and outrage at this senseless attack."

New Zealand — Prime Minister John Key condemned the attack in press conference saying "Like everybody, we're horrified by what we have seen take place in Pakistan overnight. We utterly condemn the actions that have taken place." The President of Pakistan Association of New Zealand also condemned the attack calling it "inhumane".

==== North America ====
Canada — Foreign Affairs Minister John Baird in a press conference said "He was sickened to learn militants had gunned down more than 120 people. Canada unequivocally condemns this heinous act."

United States – President Barack Obama in a statement said "The United States condemns in the strongest possible terms today's horrific attack... " US Ambassador to Pakistan Richard Olson condemned the attack in a statement, saying "The United States strongly condemns senseless and inhumane attacks on innocent students and educators, and stands in solidarity with the people of Pakistan, and all who fight the menace of terrorism." Secretary of State John Kerry said "the perpetrators of this act of terror must be brought to justice."

==== South America ====
Colombia — Ministry of Foreign Affairs issued a press release condemning the terrorist attack in Peshawar and stated that "The Government of Colombia expresses its most deepest condolences to the civilian population, and Government, of Pakistan, and wishes for a speedy recovery for those harmed and affected."

=== Religious entities ===
Ahmadiyya Muslim Community — The 5th Caliph of the community, Mirza Masroor Ahmad, condemned the attack in his Friday Sermon of 19 December 2014, delivered from Baitul Futuh mosque, saying that this was one of the most barbaric act in the history of humanity and it does not represent the true teachings of prophet of Islam, Muhammad. He extended his sympathies to the parents and families of the victims.

=== Organisations ===
==== Non-governmental organizations ====
- Amnesty International — Deputy Director David Griffiths said: "There can be absolutely no justification for targeting children in this way. This unconscionable Taliban attack is a grave reminder that civilians in north-west Pakistan desperately need effective protection from militant groups".

==== Militant groups ====
Afghan Taliban — Zabihullah Mujahid, the spokesman of Afghan Taliban, condemned the attack, saying "the intentional killing of innocent people, children and women are against the basics of Islam and this criteria has to be considered by every Islamic party and government".

Jamaat-ul-Ahrar — The Pakistani Taliban splinter group Jamaat-ul-Ahrar condemned the attack. The group's spokesman Ehsanullah Ehsan announced that like the Afghan Taliban, "we condemn the attack on the school and killing of innocent children".

Lashkar-e-Jhangvi — Ghulam Rasool Shah, a deputy for the LeJ leader Malik Ishaq condemned the attack saying "We strongly condemn the attacks on schoolchildren in Peshawar and believe that there is no religious, ethical or any other social reason for this cruel act. We stand with the Pakistan army and political leadership in this critical situation".

Al-Qaeda — Usama Mahmood, the spokesman of al Qaeda condemned the attack, saying "massacre of innocent children makes our hearts burst!"

Islamic Movement of Uzbekistan — The group praised the attack calling it a "Martyrdom Operation" and justified. "Oh Nawas and Raheel! Listen carefully to what we say! You'll harvest what you sow! You have signed to the death certificate of your children by killing the children of Muslims…If you do not take lesson from it and continue your atrocities towards Muslims, then you had better gather all your soldiers in the borders and military camps and re-allocate them as the doorkeepers to your schools and kufr institutions where your spouses work. Because our jihad of blood for blood and life for life has entered to the new stage, insha Allah!", the statement warns.

==== Celebrities ====
Several celebrities from Pakistan and India condemn over Peshawar Attack on Twitter.

- Mahira Khan wrote "The smallest coffins are the heaviest. It’s sick how these cowards think. #PeshawarAttack. "
- Fawad Khan wrote "Killing innocent children is the worst of brutality. Deeply saddened, my heart prayers go out to the suffering families #PeshawarAttack."
- Sanam Saeed wrote "Still in shock. How can someone be this cruel to kill innocent children? Their only crime was that they were educating themselves? #Peshawar. "
- Karan Johar wrote "The Peshawar killing is just heartbreaking…the death of humanity on every level…helplessness is the only feeling…"
- Shahrukh Khan wrote "The soul is healed by being with children. Extreme anger & disgust for all those who took our children, our future, our healers away. "
- Anoushey Ashraf wrote "Can’t explain how I feel. This time yesterday our angels were alive, well and happy. Doing a show on them 2day. This will be hard#PeshawarAttack. "
- Hadiqa Kiani wrote "Over 120 innocent lives taken away just like that. Disgusting. #ThisNeedsToEnnd #PeshawarAttack #PrayForPakistan"
- Shaan Shahid wrote "Its indeed a black day. I’m lost of words as the words hide behind the pain and cry. My Hearts bleed.. "
- Alia Bhatt wrote "No such thing as humanity. Its appalling to even think that we are capable of being so monstrous and so majorly MESSED UP!!!#PeshawarAttack"
- Aamir Khan wrote "Just heard about the innocent children being killed in Peshawar. I’m devastated…"
- Tapu Javeri wrote "I’m posting a black screen to mourn and protest the senseless killing of innocent children in Peshawar…"
- Deepak Perwani wrote "All I want to do now is cry for those Angels May God bless their souls #PeshawarAttack"
- Sharmeen Obaid-Chinoy wrote "There can be no explanation, no words, no excuses…it is what it is- a massacre of children- An act of war- #pakistan #taliban"
- Juggun Kazim wrote "This is WRONG. No parent should ever have to bury their child. My Pakistan MY children MY country BURNS. Baas kar do aab bardasht nahi hota. "
- Osman Khalid Butt wrote "This is not a time for political name-calling. Please, let us stand united today. MY @NJLahori No politics, only prayers. "
- Humaima Malick wrote "Please stop inflicting savagery on the innocents. They belong to the faith of love and humanity. They know nothing else. #PeshawarSchoolAttack"
- Mathira wrote "What happened in Peshawar has shook me up wat a bad day today 130ppl died oh Allah protect us put mercy in our hearts protect our kids. "
- Veena Malik wrote "I strongly condemn horrific attack of utter barbarism on innocent school children…shocked and heartbroken!!!".
- Arjun Kapoor wrote "Just reading about Peshawar never felt more helpless...my prayers with everyone in Peshawar all the children and parents...sad sad day"
- Hrithik Roshan wrote "Just a thought I had -Atrocities in d world. We’re not helpless. There's something we all can do."
- Riteish Deshmukh wrote "Death of Humanity - Wake up World - it's not their issue -it's our issue - we need to stand up. #PeshawarAttack"
- Javed Akhtar wrote "104 innocent children are killed by Taliban’s In Peshawar . A black day for humanity."
- Farhan Akhtar wrote "My heart has broken.. The world failed those children in Peshawar ... It's a sad sad day."
- Hassan Sheheryar Yasin wrote "This evil happened. It's not a bad dream. And must not become a distant memory. We must NEVER forget #PeshawarAttack"
- Priyanka Chopra wrote "I send out a prayer. pls God..in whichever form and whatever name. Pls teach your children to value human life. I pray for peace. #Peshawar"
- Shahid Kapoor wrote "Darkest day of the human race.No RELIGION tells you to kill children. Can’t believe someone is capable of this monstrosity#PeshawarAttack"
- Varun Dhawan wrote "Black day innocence lost where is humanity heading. No religion no God could ever want this.…"
- Anupam Kher wrote "Koi sagar dil ko behlata nahi, bekhudi mai bhi qarar aata nahi. Today the world is so sad. Those children deserved a long & happy life. #SAD"
- Dilip Kumar wrote "unforgivable and sinful."
- Rahul Bose wrote "Everyday reveals a new face of evil. Courage, caring, hope, justice & love are never to be lost. We need them now more than ever. #Peshawar"
- Sonakshi Sinha wrote "Oh god! What's happening in this world? Times like these make you question humanity. Everyone please pray for what's happening in #Peshawar. Terrorism has no religion. People who can do such a thing have no god. Prayers with all the parents and children going through this."
- Sonam Kapoor wrote "What a senseless unspeakable act. The world is filled with monsters. #Peshawar #PakSchoolSiege #PeshawarAttack"
- Amitabh Bachchan wrote "When innocence is silenced...There can be just silence."
- Akshay Kumar wrote "Feeling numb hearing about d terrorist attack on innocent children in #Peshawar! May God give strength to the victims’ families. RIP humanity"
- Vaani Kapoor wrote "One of the most gruesome attack..Devastating day for humanity. My prayers are with the kids and parents."
- Juhi Chawla wrote "The Peshawar tragedy is heartbreaking ..!"
- Bejoy Nambiar wrote "The horrific description of the Peshawar attack just makes you question everything that we feel is right with the world."
- Nimrat Kaur wrote "Don't have the courage to put the news on ... Reading about the children of Peshawar is heart wrenching enough . No words at all ..."
- Sania Mirza wrote "Please God..have mercy on the kids and their families..this is heart breaking and painful..What has humanity come to :("
- Manoj Bajpayee wrote "Can't think of words which will explain the pain one feels on the death of 130 kids of peshawar.my heart goes out to the parents."
- Sonu Sood wrote "How can anyone kill 100 innocent students? Can't be humans. My heart goes to the parents of those innocent Angels."
- Madhur Bhandarkar wrote "Killing innocent children has to be the final nail in humanity's coffin. Fundamentalism has found its limit today. Dastardly."
- Aditi Rao Hydari wrote "what's happening? Terrorizing people is religious? Killing people is pleasing god? This carnage is insane, inhuman. #Livid #Weepy"
- Ashwin Mushran wrote "And the death toll rises to 126 in #Peshawar. If the world does not stop this evil we don't have worry about the ozone layer. We'll all die."
- Resul Pookutty wrote "More than 100 children is believed to have been killed by mindless barbarians...Hamara Khuda Ithina chotte nahi ho sakta..."
- Sophie Choudry wrote "Innocent kids are victims & yet again religion the sick excuse. Heart-broken & ashamed that this is the world we live in!"
- Taapsee Pannu wrote "k now it's getting scarier day by day. First Australia, now Pakistan. What next??? I fear to even think,"
- Raveena Tandon wrote "The horror the pain ! Oh god you are being questioned now as the world sheds tears for those innocent souls! Lil Angels of the future!"
- Vishal Dadlani wrote "No God will ever forgive the Taliban for this. They're forever condemned, and I hope they don't even get burials when they die."
- Shibani Kashyap wrote "Very sad.. hoping and praying for a stop to such harmful incidences."
- Ali Zafar wrote "Our leaders should announce to collectively build & rebuild even more schools tomorrow and make education their first priority than politics."
- Mahesh Bhatt wrote "Holy Prophet described a true Muslim as someone whose words and deeds do not harm any person in any way, and here we have brother killing brother! Why is it that only a believer kills and not a non-believer? It's a very strange thing."
- Anushka Sharma wrote "This is the cruelest most inhuman and cowardly act. It pains me so much. Prayers & strength with the families of the innocent kids killed."
