= Ahrar-ul-Hind =

Militant Islamist group in Pakistan

Ahrar ul Hind (Urdu: احرار الہند; lit. freeones of India) was a militant Islamist group in Pakistan that split from the Tehrik-i-Taliban Pakistan (TTP) in February 2014. During peace talks between the Pakistani government and TTP, Ahrar-ul-Hind issued a statement to the media rejecting the talks, and announcing that they would not accept any peace agreement. Following its initial announcement, the group claimed responsibility for a number of attacks in Pakistan, including the Islamabad court attack, before merging into the Jamaat-ul-Ahrar group in August 2014.

== Etymology ==
The group's name literally meant freedom fighters of India (referring to the Indian subcontinent as a whole). According to a commander of a Taliban group, the group derived its name of "Ahrar" from Majlis-e-Ahrar-ul-Islam, because the Ahraris were against the partition of India and the formation of Pakistan; they, rather, believed that the entire subcontinent was their homeland. The commander said that the group planned to expand their operations to the remaining part of the subcontinent.

== Split from Tehrik-i-Taliban Pakistan ==
The group mostly contained Taliban from Mohmand Agency's Tribes, with some members from the Punjabi Taliban based in southern Punjab. Many of its members were based in eastern Afghanistan. While the group claimed to have split from the TTP because of opposition to peace talks with the government and after advice from a certain Paracha Saab (a patwari of note), some observers believed the group was used by the TTP to carry out deniable attacks without disrupting the cease fire talks.

== Relations with TTP ==
The Pakistani government made disowning Ahrar-ul-Hind a condition of the TTP for peace talks to continue, while simultaneously carrying out airstrikes on Ahrar-ul-Hind bases. In response, the Taliban announced a ceasefire and accepted the condition of dealing with Ahrar-ul-Hind. After this announcement, the group claimed an attack on the Islamabad High Court in March 2014.

In August 2014, Omar Khalid Khorasani merged Ahrar-ul-Hind with other dissident TTP commanders into a new group called Jamaat-ul-Ahrar, formally splitting away from Tehreek-e-Taliban Pakistan in September 2014.

== See also ==
- Tehrik-i-Taliban Pakistan
- Jamaat-ul-Ahrar
- Operation Zarb-e-Azb
