= Urain Ge =

2015 single by Ali Zafar

- Title cover

Single by Ali Zafar
- Language: Urdu
- Released: 7 February 2015
- Recorded: 2015
- Genre: Patriotic
- Length: 4:28
- Label: Saga
- Songwriter: Ali Zafar

"Urain Ge" (Urdu: اڑیں گے, lit. 'We Will Fly') is a 2015 Pakistani song, written and produced by Ali Zafar. It was released in honour of the victims of the 2014 Peshawar school massacre, and to support the campaign titled 141 Schools for Peace with The Citizens Foundation.

== Background ==
In 2014, Pakistan faced military and political instability, when Pakistan Armed Forces launched Operation Zarb-e-Azb in North Waziristan against various groups, including Tehreek-i-Taliban Pakistan (TTP), in the wake of terrorism.

Later, on 16 December 2014, six gunmen attacked the Army Public School, Peshawar, killing 132 children and 9 school staff members, making it one of the world's deadliest school massacres. Pakistan Army's Special Service Group (SSG) launched a quick rescue operation and killed the terrorists. They rescued an estimated 960 people, though 139 were injured. Omar Khalid Khorasani, TTP's spokesperson, took responsibility for the attack and claimed it was a revenge against the Operation Zarb-e-Azb.

The school reopened on 12 January 2015 under strict security, and the students and staff showed resilience..

== Songwriting and recording ==
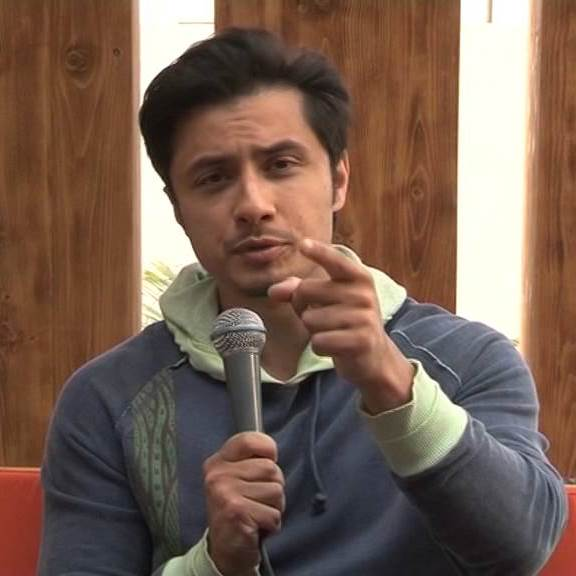
Zafar in 2015

Ali Zafar cancelled his concert tours and events soon after the massacre, including the one in Durban, South Africa, on New Year's Eve. Weeks later, he went to his studio to write and record the song "Urain Ge". It was released on 7 February 2015 via ARY Digital Network. Musician Asad Ahmed shared that he was hired to play the bass only, but he changed the orchestration into electric guitars.

"We don't have a choice but to take a united stand against terrorism [...] education is the way forward. It's the key to progress and peace".

— Ali Zafar, who endorsed TCF's 141 Schools for Peace campaign

To record the music video, he gathered several celebrities from the country at a studio in Korangi, Karachi. They included Aamina Sheikh, Ahsan Khan, Aijaz Aslam, Ali Azmat, Ali Kazmi, Anwar Maqsood, Asad Ahmed, Behroze Sabzwari, Bilal Lashari, Bushra Ansari, Fahad Mustafa, Farhad Humayun, Fawad Khan, Fariha Pervez, Goher Mumtaz, Hadiqa Kiani, Hamza Ali Abbasi, Haroon Rashid, Haroon Shahid, Humaima Malick, Humayun Saeed, Imran Abbas, Jawed Sheikh, Junaid Khan, Junaid Younus, Mahira Khan, Meesha Shafi, Mehreen Raheal, Mehwish Hayat, Mikaal Zulfiqar, Mohammed Ali Shehki, Mohib Mirza, Saba Qamar, Sanam Saeed, Sahira Kazmi, Sajid Hasan, Sajjad Ali, and Shoaib Malik. They also commented about the need to honour the victims and aspire for the better future of the country, where no mother is separated from her child and love prevails over the pain. (Note: Credits extracted from the music video) Shehzad Roy also recorded and sent his video separately.

Shahzeb Jillani wrote in BBC News that the song starts in a "grave" mood, but the rising tempo transforms the music into "something uplifting". Anum Rehman Chagani of Dawn believed that the song may "become the anthem for hope for our nation". Hasan Ansari of The Express Tribune called it one of the "patriotic songs" that struck "the right chord with the audiences". Besides the showbiz unity in the music video, Zafar also appreciated the political unity after a long dispute in the aftermath of the Peshawar attack. He also urged nationwide unity, to put a positive image of the country moving towards progress and peace in the world.

=== Personnel ===
- Video conceived and produced by Ali Zafar
- Directed by Abdullah Haris and Bilal Khan
- Public relations: Ammara Hikmat
- Flute/Orchestral arrangement: Baqir Abbas
- Programming: Badshah
- Electric guitar: Asad Ahmed
- Acoustic guitar: Danyal Zafar
- Director of photography: Saif and Sabeeh Khan
- Editing: Mukhtar Ali Awan and Abdullah Haris
- Rotoscoping: Adnan Ayub
- Post-production: 12Gates
- Hair and makeup: N-Pro by Nabila

== Influence ==
The Citizens Foundation (TCF), an educational nonprofit organization that builds schools for underprivileged children in Pakistan, partnered with the 141 Schools for Peace campaign, and decided the locations across Pakistan to build the schools. Ali Zafar, whose parents are educationalists, also wanted to contribute to education and committed to supporting the cause by donating all proceeds from the song "Urain Ge".

At Rs. 10 per legal sale of the song, the Ali Zafar Foundation donated about Rs. 2 lakh to the cause. (Note: See Indian numbering system. In 2015, US$1 was equivalent to average Rs. 102.70.) Their collective aim was to build 141 schools and dedicate each school to a victim of the Peshawar attack, which was achieved by the tenth anniversary in 2024.

== See also ==
- Dhanak Kay Rang
