= 141 Schools for Peace =

2014–2024 social campaign in Pakistan

- Nickname: 141schools.org
- Formation: 29 December 2014
- Founder: Zaki Patel; Syeda Zaki
- Founded at: Canada
- Dissolved: 16 December 2024
- Type: Not-for-profit organization
- Purpose: Build and dedicate a school to each victim of the 2014 Peshawar school massacre
- Region served: Pakistan
- Affiliations: The Citizens Foundation

The 141 Schools for Peace, also known as 141schools.org, was an NFPO social campaign founded in 2014 by a Canada-based Pakistani couple, Zaki Patel and Syeda Zaki, and executed by The Citizens Foundation (TCF) in Pakistan. Its aim was to raise funds for building 141 schools and dedicate one to each of the victims of the 2014 Peshawar school massacre.

It gained thousands of online pledges from different countries within a few days. The campaign was viewed as an initiative against terrorism and to address the shortage of schools in the country. The goal was accomplished by the tenth anniversary of the massacre in 2024.

== Background ==
On 16 December 2014, six gunmen attacked the Army Public School, Peshawar, and killed 148 people, making it one of the world's deadliest school massacres. The Pakistan Army's Special Service Group (SSG) launched a quick rescue operation and killed the terrorists. They rescued an estimated 960 people, though 139 were injured. The victims included 132 children and 9 school staff members, including the school's principal, Tahira Qazi, while surviving students witnessed several of their teachers and classmates being killed. The school reopened on 12 January 2015 under strict security.

== Founders ==
Zaki Patel and his wife, Syeda Zaki, started a web campaign to collect funds to build the schools. The couple is from Karachi, Pakistan, but resides and works in Canada. He is a computer science graduate from McGill University and works as a web developer, while she has a finance background and works as a social entrepreneur. The idea that inspired him was from the social media response, that the best reply to terrorism is to build schools, and he said that the movement's aim was to "perpetuate positivity out of something quite horrific".

Consequently, he founded a not-for-profit organization and created a webpage for it, 141schools.org, and used the hashtag #141SchoolsforPeace for marketing on Twitter. Although the number of deaths in the Peshawar attack later increased, the campaign maintained its aim of dedicating each of the schools to the 141 victims. He hoped that 141 people would join him, though a greater number of people signed up from many countries, including Pakistan, the U.S., and India. They claimed to have received 15,000 pledges within just three days. He further said they were to receive building material from glass and paint factories, and that some organizations contacted them to help train teachers as well.

== Execution ==
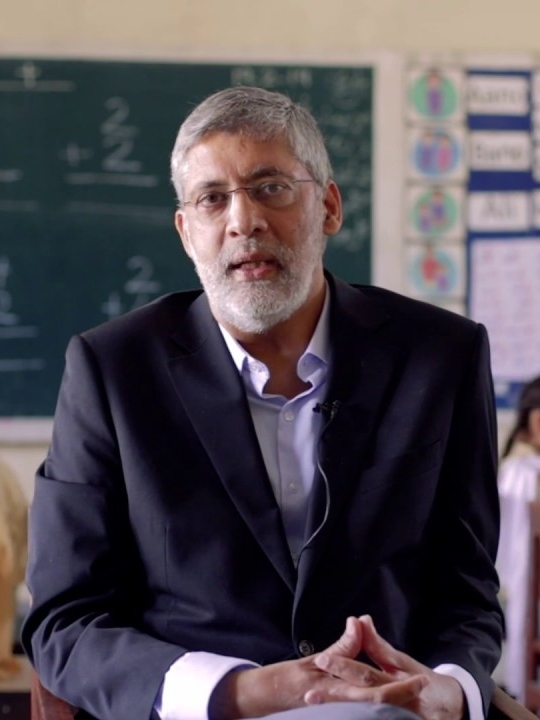
Syed Asaad Ayub Ahmad, CEO of The Citizens Foundation

The mission was magnified after a partnership with The Citizens Foundation, an educational nonprofit organization that builds schools for underprivileged children in Pakistan. TCF planned the locations across Pakistan depending upon the availability of students, teachers, and land. Zaki Patel had pitched this idea to TCF so they took over the management and planning in late December 2014. Syed Asaad Ayub Ahmad, CEO of The Citizens Foundation, dedicated this to the "right to education" and "dreams of a peaceful future" against the "formidable challenges facing the nation".

Their initial goal was to accomplish the campaign within three years. TCF spokesperson Ayesha Khatib said that each unit would take six months to construct and 12 to 18 months to become fully functional, although it depended upon the donations. The budgetary cost to establish a school was estimated to be US$148,000, bringing the total to approximately US$21 million for 141 schools. An additional amount was also estimated to cover operational costs for three years. (Note: In 2015, US$1 was equivalent to average Rs. 102.70.) Another spokesperson Sarah Tahir said that they planned to enroll 180 students per unit, thus a total of about 25,380 students.

Reportedly, 23 schools were constructed by the first anniversary in December 2015, and about 18 more schools were under construction during the second year in 2016. By the tenth anniversary in 2024, TCF announced that they had "successfully established 141 school units" and called it a journey "more than building brick and mortar" towards an "empowered Pakistan".

== Reception ==
For The Express Tribune, Essa Malik and Hurmat Majid called it a "noble thought" turning into "reality", while Teenaz Javat called it "a giant step towards materialising" the "dream" of "an academic milestone". Zareen Muzaffar of The Diplomat described it as "healing Pakistan's wounds" and "addressing Pakistan's shortage of schools". Writing for The Guardian, Madiha Waris Qureshi, an ex-employee of TCF, wrote that this initiative was "perhaps the best tribute possible" that "directly undercuts the criminal ignorance". In The Friday Times, Amna Khawar called it "a daunting task" and commended the movement for helping to keep "the memory alive and never forget". Zofeen Ebrahim wrote that rather than calling for "penalties for the attackers", the "active citizens" aimed at "longer-term solutions for the future of this deeply troubled country".

Ali Zafar wrote for CNN that "the entire nation stands as one for this cause". He released the song "Urain Ge" and pledged to donate all proceeds to the initiative. Usman Riaz, a musician and filmmaker, performed in Karachi at the fundraising event arranged by TCF in January 2015 for this initiative. Other fundraising efforts that year included a March campaign at Smith College in Northampton, as well as an event in Westlake, Ohio, announced in April by Romona Robinson of WOIO.
