= Ehsanullah Ehsan (Taliban spokesman) =

Taliban spokesman

Ehsanullah Ehsan (Urdu: احسان اللہ احسان, real name: Liaqat Ali (Urdu: لیاقت علی)) is a former spokesman of Tehreek-e-Taliban Pakistan (TTP) and later Jamaat-ul-Ahrar. As a spokesperson of the groups, Ehsan would use media campaigns, social media networks and call up local journalists to claim responsibility for terrorist attacks on behalf of the groups. He was initially a spokesman for the Tehreek-e-Taliban Pakistan (TTP). In 2014, he left TTP after he had developed ideological differences with the TTP leadership following the appointment of Fazlullah as the leader of the group. He later co-founded Jamaat-ul-Ahrar and became its spokesman. In 2015, as a spokesman of Jamaat-ul-Ahrar, he condemned Fazlullah-led Tehrik-e-Taliban attack on a school in Peshawar.

In April 2017, Inter-Services Public Relations (ISPR) Director-General Asif Ghafoor announced that Ehsan had surrendered himself to Pakistan's security agencies. However, ISPR's claim was disputed by Jamaat-ul-Ahrar, who said that Ehansullah Ehsan was captured by ISI from Paktika province of Afghanistan.

While Ehsan was in the custody of Pakistani security forces, several high ranking TTP members like Qari Saifullah Mehsud, Sheikh Khalid Haqqani and Qari Saif Younis were assassinated in Afghanistan. TTP members believe that the Pakistan's ISI was responsible for the killings. Several anti-terrorist operations were also conducted by Pakistani security forces in Pakistan based on the information provided by Ehsan.

In early February 2020, Ehsanullah claimed that he has escaped from the custody of Pakistani Agencies.

== Militant activity ==
In December 2011, Ehsanullah disputed that the Pakistani Taliban was negotiating a cease-fire with the Pakistani government. He asserted that the individuals negotiating that cease-fire were doing so without the authorization of the Taliban's leadership. He was sacked on 25 June 2013.

In April 2017, Inter-Services Public Relations (ISPR) Director-General Asif Ghafoor announced that Ehsan had surrendered himself to Pakistan's security agencies. However, Jamaat-ul-Ahrar disputed ISPR's claim. Jamaat-ul-Ahrar said that Ehansullah Ehsan did not surrender, rather he was captured by Inter-Service Intelligence (ISI) from Paktika province of Afghanistan. The group further stated that Ehsan was captured on 7 March by Inter-Service Intelligence (ISI) and was later handed over to the Pakistan army. Paktika province of Afghanistan is known as safe haven for multiple terrorist groups.

In February 2020, Ehsanullah Ehsan managed to escape from the custody of Pakistani security forces. According to Pakistani officials, the ex-TTP spokesperson had shared extremely sensitive and important information while in custody, which led the security forces to smash the local and international networks of the TTP and Jamaat-ul-Ahrar. Several terrorists from the outlawed groups were arrested based on his leads. Pakistani officials said that "Ehsan would be brought to justice, but first it was necessary to extract information from him to take the anti-terrorism operations to a logical conclusion." According to Pakistani officials, Ehsan managed to escape during an anti-terrorist operation. At least 12 Pakistan army officers were punished for their lapses that allowed Ehsanullah to escape. Pakistan officials also said that efforts were being made to recapture Ehsan.

== Responsibility for attacks ==
Some of the attacks for which Ehsan claimed responsibility as a TTP and Jamaat-ul-Ahrar spokesman are:

- On 9 October 2012, Ehsan claimed responsibility for the Taliban shooting in the head of a 15-year-old Pakistani activist, Malala Yousafzai, a girl who was famous for highlighting Taliban atrocities. He said that the teenager's work had been an "obscenity" that needed to be stopped: "This was a new chapter of obscenity, and we have to finish this chapter." On 15 October, Pakistani interior minister, Rehman Malik, offered a $1 million bounty for Ehsan.
- On 22 November 2012, Ehsan claimed Taliban responsibility for suicide bombings carried out the day before against Shiites in Rawalpindi and Karachi. As justification for the attacks, he stated that "the Shiite community is engaged in defiling the Prophet." He also asserted that his group's activities would continue "irrespective of security measures taken by Rehman Malik."
- On 15 December 2012, Ehsan confirmed Taliban involvement in a rocket attack on Bacha Khan International Airport that killed 4 people and wounded 35. He noted that the attack's intended target was actually an adjacent airbase, and claimed that the Taliban "have planned more attacks on Pakistani forces and its installation as it works to please the USA".
- On 23 June 2013, Ehsan claimed responsibility for the killing of nine foreign tourists and their guide in Gilgit-Balitistan.
- On 2 November 2014, Ehsan claimed responsibility for the 2014 Wagah border suicide attack. "Some other groups have claimed responsibility of this attack, but these claims are baseless. We will soon release the video of this attack," he said. "This attack is revenge for the killing of innocent people in North Waziristan," the banned militant group's spokesman said.
- On 7 November 2014, Ehsan claimed responsibility for twin blasts that killed at least six people in Mohmand agency. The blasts targeted the peace committee volunteers in Chinari village of Safi Tehsil. Ehsanullah Ehsan claimed responsibility for the blasts targeting members of government backed peace committee and vowed to continue attacking tribal peace committees.
- On 21 November 2014, Ehsan claimed responsibility for a grenade attack, on the micro-blogging website Twitter, on the membership camp of Muttahida Qaumi Movement (MQM) in Orangi Town area of Karachi. Three members of the Sindh Assembly and 50 workers were injured.
- On 16 December 2014, Ehsan as a spokesman of Jamaat-ul-Ahrar, condemned Fazlullah-led Tehrik-e-Taliban attack on a school in Peshawar.
- On 16 August 2015, Ehsan claimed responsibility for the killing of Col. (R) Shujaat Khanzada (Punjab Interior Minister) with the help of Lashkar-e-Jhangvi and said that they will fix all those who are against ASWJ, LJ & Molana Ghazi. Ehsanullah Ehsan was a member of Jamaat ul-Ahrar at the time but according to a report in The News by Amir Mir, it was a combined operation of LeJ and JuA.
- On 27 March 2016, Ehsan claimed responsibility for the bombing at Lahore park, Pakistan. Ehsan stated that the attack was on Christians, as they were celebrating Easter.
- On 13 September 2016, Ehsan claimed responsibility for the IED blast in Quetta, Pakistan, that targeted a police vehicle, killing at least 2 and injuring 5 policemen.
- On 21 December 2016, Ehsan killed 50 people in a bombing in a mall. Police were unable to capture him.

== See also ==
- Jamaat-ul-Ahrar
- Tehreek-i-Taliban Pakistan
- Fazlullah
- Operation Zarb-e-Azb
