= Omar Khalid =

Omar Khalid may refer to:

- Umar Khalid (born 1987), Indian activist
- Omar Khalid Khorasani (born Abdul Wali Mohmand; 1977–2022), a Pakistani militant of the Tehrik-i-Taliban Pakistan
