= Pakistan Army Retribution =

2015 Android video game

- Publisher: Punjab Information Technology Board
- Platform: Android
- Release: WW: December 2015
- Genre: First-person shooter
- Mode: Single-player

Pakistan Army Retribution is a Pakistani first-person shooter video game based upon the 2014 Peshawar school massacre. Developed as part of a peaceful campaign, it was designed as showing schoolchildren that "the best weapons are the pen and the book". After a negative review by English-language newspaper DAWN, the developer intentionally removed the game from the Google Play Store.

== Gameplay ==
Pakistan Army Retribution is a first-person shooter. It is during the 2014 Peshawar school massacre, which events the game depicts. After the game begins by playing the Pakistan national anthem, the player must defeat Taliban terrorists across nine levels. On-screen controls allow the player to move around, as well as shoot enemies. A radar shows where enemies are.

== Development and release ==
Pakistan Army Retribution is based upon the events of the 2014 Peshawar school massacre, the deadliest terrorist attack in Pakistan. Marking the one-year anniversary of the events, it was developed as part of the Peaceful Pakistan campaign, promoting peace and tolerance in Pakistan. Being one of "dozens of videos, jingles and social media items", Pakistan Army Retribution was commissioned by the Pakistan Army and the Punjab Information Technology Board and developed by an independent studio for Android.

== Reception and subsequent pull from Google Play ==
In its review, Munir Rahool of DAWN was critical of the graphics and controls of the game. The subject matter especially was thought of as to be "poor taste". "Any recreation of the carnage that day seems insensitive" and questioned if the game was made to honour Pakistan Army soldiers. After the review, people on Twitter also outed their criticism on the subject of the game.

After the criticism on social media, Umar Saif, chairman of the Punjab Information Technology Board, voluntarily pulled the game from the Google Play Store. Saif said that "In hindsight it was not a good thing to do" and that the developer responsible misunderstood the intention of the peace campaign. He said the game "opened issue surrounding radicalization" and spoke off security issues. He thanked people for pointing out the mistake.
