= 2014 Wagah border suicide attack =

Terrorist attack in Punjab, Pakistan

Wagah border suicide attack واہگہ بارڈر خودکش حملہ
- Location of Lahore in Punjab
- Location: 31°36′16.9″N 74°34′22.5″E; Wagah, Punjab, Pakistan
- Date: 2 November 2014; 17.35 (UTC+5)
- Target: Civilians
- Attack type: Suicide attack
- Weapon: Bomb
- Deaths: 60
- Injuries: 100
- Perpetrator: Jamaat-ul-Ahrar
- Motive: Retaliation against Operation Zarb-e-Azb

Location of Wagah Border

On 2 November 2014, a suicide bombing took place at Wagah border following the daily border ceremony in Pakistan. The attack was claimed by three rival islamist militant groups.

At midnight of 9 January 2015, the FIA team led by special agents reportedly hunted and killed the mastermind of the attack in a police encounter which took place in Lahore. The Pakistani government officials confirmed the veracity of the reports.

== Background ==
A daily ceremonial closing of the border between India and Pakistan takes place at the Wagah border with tourists sitting on the respective sides of the border observing.

=== Warning ===
According to an unnamed official, the American and Pakistan intelligence communities had prior knowledge of such attack and had been alerted about the mode of a possible attack at the Wagah border. They were informed about a missing young boy who might be used as a would-be suicide bomber. The commissioner police Captain (retired) Amin Waince said the CID police had conveyed the threat about possible suicide attack to the Rangers at Wagah Border on 1 November.

== Bombing ==
The bomb blast occurred outside a restaurant in a parking area near a Pakistani paramilitary soldiers’ checkpoint. Up to 25 kg (55 lb) of explosive material was used in the blast. Footage showed destroyed shops and nearby buildings at the site of the blast. Preliminary reports regarding the nature of the explosion had suggested that a gas cylinder exploded. Later on, Director General Rangers Punjab Khan Tahir Khan confirmed that the explosion was a suicide blast saying that "the parade venue is about 600 metres (2,000 ft) ahead of the blast site. Because of the strict checking, the suicide bomber detonated the bomb away from the parade venue.". The bomber was said to have detonated his explosives as close to the security checkpoint as possible seeing as he would be unable to cross into the stands where more people were seated.

Security personnel conducted a search operation in the areas adjoining the Wagah border crossing near Lahore. They recovered a lot of explosives and suicide vests, which were defused after intelligence agencies received information regarding the presence of a 'suspicious person' in the area.

At least 60 people were killed and over 100 people were injured. The Punjab government declared a state of emergency in all the public sector hospitals in Lahore. Victims included 10 women and eight children. Eight people from one family were also killed in the blast.

== Responsibility and motive ==
Responsibility for the bomb blast was claimed separately by the outlawed Jundallah, Pakistani Taliban (TTP), and the breakaway TTP faction Jamaat-ul-Ahrar.

TTP spokesman Ahmed Marwat said via telephone that the attack was a reaction to Operation Zarb-e-Azb and Waziristan military operations.

The Jamaat-ul-Ahrar splinter group of the banned TTP claimed responsibility for the attack as its spokesman Ehsanullah Ehsan, speaking to Dawn on telephone from Afghanistan, said it was carried out by one of their men. "Some other groups have claimed responsibility of this attack, but these claims are baseless. We will soon release the video of this attack. This attack is revenge for the killing of innocent people in North Waziristan," the militant group's spokesman said. Pakistan's intelligence community quickly identified the mastermind of the attack and determined the attack planned by the Roohullah— a senior terrorist operative of the TTP Lahore chapter.

=== Alleged bomber ===
A spokesman for the militant group Jamaat-ul-Ahrar, Ehsanullah Ehsan, released details and photo of a man they claim carried out the suicide bombing. He told Dawn.com that 25-year-old Hanifullah alias Hamza carried out the attack.

=== Manhunt by FIA ===
Since the attack took place, the FIA, IB and other law enforcement agencies had been on a massive manhunt for the mastermind of the attack, Rahooullah (alias: Asadullah). At midnight of 9 January 2015, the special agents of FIA's counterterrorism wing, aided by the Punjab Police, raided a house in Lahore. After a two-hour long gun battle, Rahooullah was reportedly gunned down in a deadly police encounter, along with his three associates.

== Reactions ==
- India - Prime Minister Narendra Modi condemned the bombing. "Terror attack in Pakistan near Wagah Border is shocking. I strongly condemn such a dastardly act of terrorism," Modi said on his Twitter account. "My condolences to the families of the deceased. Prayers with the injured." The Indian government also called for the suspension of the daily closing festivities for at least three days.
- United States - Ambassador to Pakistan Richard Olson said: "On behalf of the American people, I extend my heartfelt sympathies and condolences to the families of the victims as well as to the Government and people of Pakistan. We support Pakistan’s efforts to bring all those involved in planning and executing this attack to justice and stand ready to provide any appropriate assistance to authorities investigating this tragic attack."
- United Nations - United Nations Secretary-General Ban Ki-moon condemned the suicide attack. UN spokesman Stephane Dujarric said, "The secretary general condemns in the strongest terms the terrorist attack that took place yesterday on the Pakistani side of the Wagah border crossing with India. Such terrorist acts are not justifiable under any circumstances. The secretary general urges the Pakistani authorities to bring those responsible to justice."

== See also ==
- 2013 Lahore bombing
- 2014 Peshawar school massacre
- Operation Zarb-e-Azb
- Samjhauta Express bombing
- List of terrorist incidents, 2014
