= The Citizens Foundation =

Pakistani non-profit organization

- Abbreviation: TCF
- Established: 1995
- Type: Non-profit organization
- Purpose: Education, community development
- Headquarters: Karachi, Pakistan
- Location: Pakistan
- Method: Donations and grants
- President and CEO: Zia Akhter Abbas
- Website: https://www.tcf.org.pk/

The Citizens Foundation (TCF) is a non-profit organization, a privately owned network of low-cost formal schools in Pakistan. The foundation has set up a network of 2,033 school units, educating 301,000 students through a network of 21,000 dedicated employees, out which 14,700 are all-female employees, of which thousands are TCF's own students returning to contribute to the organization. Moreover, TCF also conducts a number of social development programs in communities linked to its schools which has taught reading and writing to many.

== Introduction ==
The Citizens Foundation (TCF) was established in August 1995. It is a charitable organization that builds and runs schools, providing primary and secondary education to boys and girls in rural areas and urban slums of Pakistan. As of July 2024, TCF has expanded its network to 2,033 operational school units, which provide education to 301,000 students. The Economist has called The Citizens Foundation (TCF) "perhaps the largest network of independently run schools in the world." The foundation has an all-female faculty of 14,700 teachers and principals.

=== Origin ===
The current literacy rate of Pakistan is 62.3 which means that an estimated population of 60 million is illiterate in the country. Like other developing countries of the world, Pakistan also faces issues of population explosion, poverty, unemployment, income disparity and low literacy rate. In 1995, six successful top-level managers of Pakistan attempted to find a way to solve these problems, and the root cause identified by them was education. Within a few months, they formed The Citizens Foundation (TCF) in Karachi. Pakistan has the second highest number of out-of-school children in the world, and it is the world's sixth largest country. To tackle this challenge, the founders of TCF wanted to leverage their experience building companies to build a network of schools for the country's poorest, out-of-school children. The group put their own money into a pilot to build 5 schools in Karachi's slums that did not have electricity, sanitation, and clean water.

== Community development ==
In addition to the education program, TCF also operates some community development programs through the school premises.

== Government Schools Program ==
In 2016, TCF's Strategic Development Unit (SDU) initiated the Government Schools Program, under which TCF took over operations at 274 adopted government schools. 256 of these schools are in Punjab, 8 in Sindh and 5 in KPK and 5 in Baluchistan.

=== Distance Learning and Support Program ===
To ensure continuity of learning for millions of children who were forced to stay out of school due to lockdowns, TCF developed a TV-based edutainment program named "Ilm Ka Aangan" (The Learning Courtyard), in collaboration with Pakistan Television's Tele-school and the Federal Ministry of Education.

== Allocation of donations ==
Being a charitable organisation the sole source of income is donations. They receive nearly 80% of the funds from Pakistanis at home, which include corporate sponsorship and individuals. The rest of the donations are received from expatriate communities. More than 90% of the funds are utilized in the building and running of schools, providing equipment for libraries and science laboratories, children's uniforms, books and snacks. The remaining are allocated for administration costs.

== 141 Schools for Peace ==
In the aftermath of 2014 Peshawar school massacre, one of the world's deadliest school massacres, TCF collaborated in a campaign to build 141 schools, each in the memory of a martyr; 132 children and 9 school staff members. Ali Zafar also donated all proceeds from the song "Urain Ge" to support the cause. By the tenth anniversary in 2024, TCF announced that the mission to establish 141 units had been completed.

== International presence ==
TCF is supported by a global network of Chapters

- The Citizens Foundation, USA: a 501(c) (3) tax-exempt organization (recognized by the U.S. Internal Revenue Service) and a 4-star Charity Navigator rating
- The Citizens Foundation (UK): Registered with the UK Charity Commission
- The Citizens Foundation, Canada: Registered by the Canada Revenue Agency (CRA) as a Charity
- TCF Educating Children Australia, Inc: registered with the Australian Charities and Not-for-profits Commission ACNC

== Awards and recognition ==
2010 - World Innovation Summit for Education (WISE) Award by the Qatar Foundation
