= 2014 Peshawar school massacre =

Terrorist attack in Peshawar, Pakistan

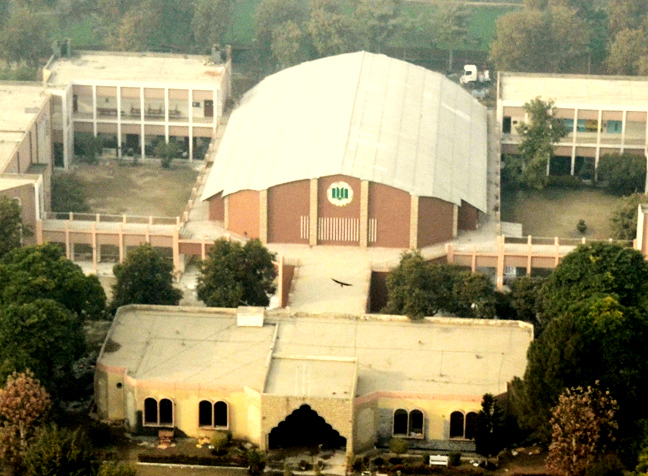
- Army Public School Auditorium, Peshawar, Pakistan

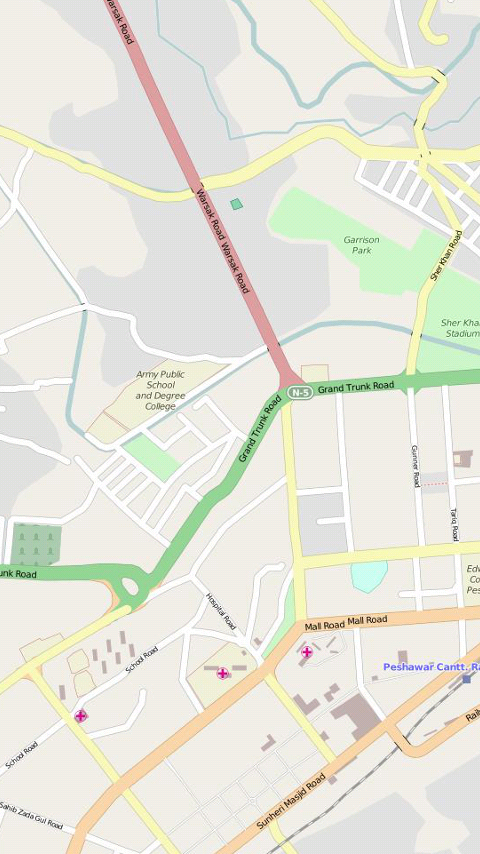
- Location of the attack: Army Public School is located in the centre
- Location: 34°00′49″N 71°32′10″E; Army Public School Peshawar, Warsak Road, Peshawar, Khyber Pakhtunkhwa, Pakistan
- Date: 16 December 2014; 11 years ago 10:30 PKT – 19:56 PKT (UTC+05:00)
- Target: Students and staff at Army Public School Peshawar
- Attack type: Suicide bombing Murder-suicide, mass shooting, hostage-taking, school shooting
- Deaths: 155 (including the six perpetrators)
- Injuries: 114
- Perpetrator: Tehrik-i-Taliban Pakistan
- Defender: Pakistan Army: Special Services Group
- Motive: Retaliation against: National Action Plan; Operation Zarb-e-Azb

On 16 December 2014, six gunmen affiliated with the Tehrik-i-Taliban Pakistan (TTP) conducted a terrorist attack on the Army Public School in the northwestern Pakistani city of Peshawar. The terrorists, all of whom were foreign nationals, comprising one Chechen, three Arabs and two Afghans, entered the school and opened fire on school staff and children, killing 149 people including 132 schoolchildren ranging between eight and eighteen years of age, making it the world's eighth deadliest school massacre. Pakistan launched a rescue operation undertaken by the Pakistan Army's Special Services Group (SSG) special forces, who killed all six terrorists and rescued 960 people. In the long term, the national outrage against the targeted killing of schoolchildren led to Pakistan establishing the National Action Plan to crack down on terrorism.

According to various news agencies and commentators, the nature and preparation of the attack was very similar to that of the Beslan school hostage crisis that occurred in the North Ossetia–Alania region of the Russian Federation in 2004.

Pakistan responded to the attacks by lifting its moratorium on the death penalty, committing more resources to the War in North-West Pakistan, and authorizing military courts to try civilians through a constitutional amendment. On 2 December 2015, Pakistan hanged four militants involved in the Peshawar massacre. Two other militants had committed suicide by bombing themselves in the massacre. The mastermind of the attack, Omar Khorasani, was killed in Afghanistan on 7 August 2022 by a roadside mine. The Supreme Court of Pakistan upheld the death sentences of two more convicts involved in the attack in the Said Zaman Khan v. Federation of Pakistan case on 29 August 2016.

== Background ==
In June 2014, a joint military offensive was conducted by the Pakistan Armed Forces against various groups in North Waziristan which had been the site of a wave of violence. The military offensive, Operation Zarb-e-Azb, was launched in the wake of the 8 June attack on Jinnah International Airport in Karachi, for which the TTP claimed responsibility. It was part of the ongoing war in North-West Pakistan in which more than 2,100 have been killed so far, and, according to the Army, almost 90% of North Waziristan has been cleared.

== Attack ==
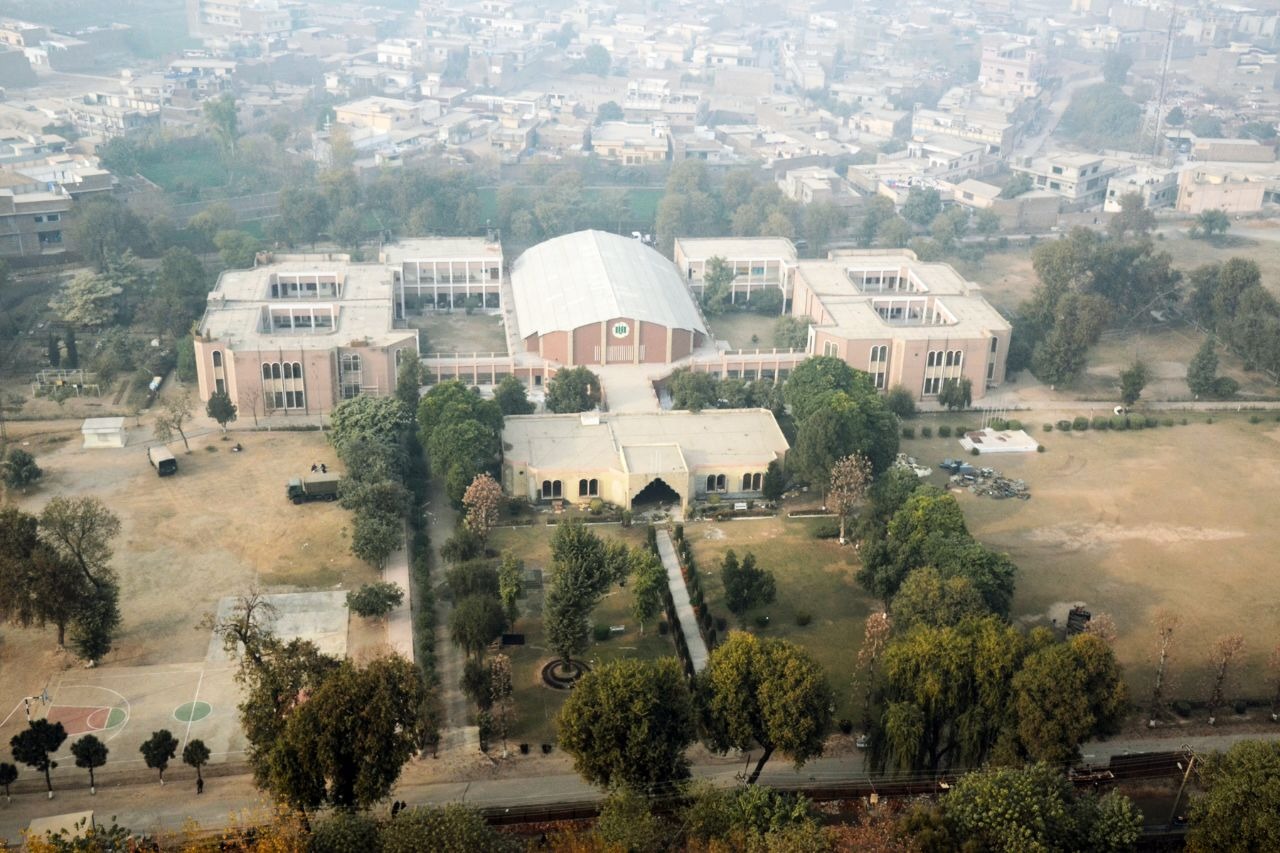
Army Public School Peshawar, KP

Army Public School is located at Warsak Road near the Peshawar Cantt, and is a part of Army Public Schools and College Systems that runs 146 schools across Pakistan. On the day of the attack, a total of 1,099 students and staff were registered in the school. The attack began at around 10:30 a.m., when seven gunmen wearing explosive belts entered the school after having scaled the walls. Before entering the school, the gunmen set fire to the Suzuki Bolan ST41 van in which they had arrived. The terrorists, bearing automatic weapons and grenades, moved straight toward the auditorium located at the centre of the complex and opened fire indiscriminately on the children who were gathered there for an assembly on first aid training.

According to the Director General of the Inter-Services Public Relations (ISPR) and public relations department of the Pakistani military, Major-General Asim Bajwa, the terrorists did not intend to take any hostages but instead wanted to kill as many people as they could. As the terrorists opened fire, many of the people ran toward the two exits on the other side of the auditorium; many others were gunned down in the garden. Reports also surfaced that pupils were forced to watch teachers be killed in front of them. This included principal Tahira Qazi, who was shot in the head in front of her students.

Within 15 minutes, the SSG teams had stormed the school and entered the premises from two sides in their heavy armoured vehicles and trucks. Immediately, the SSG personnel engaged the terrorists, preventing them from going after and killing other remaining teaching staff and students. The gunmen moved to the administration block of the school and took hostages there. One of them was shot by the military personnel near the auditorium, while the other five managed to make it to the administration block. Emergency trauma teams and units of the Army Medical Corps in military armoured vehicles were rushed to the school; the Army Corps of Military Police and the provincial civilian Khyber Pakhtunkhwa Police (KP Police) worked towards closing off any potential escape routes for the terrorists.

Meanwhile, the SSG commandos had reached the area and surrounded the administration block. Most of the operation took place in the attempt to clear this block and rescue the hostages taken by the gunmen. Special teams of snipers and their spotters pinpointed the terrorists. One of the six attackers was killed by the snipers from the windows and air vents, while the other three were killed when the commandos stormed the building and rescued the remaining hostages in the process. Seven commandos, including two officers, were injured in the battle. A search and clearance operation was started immediately to defuse any IEDs planted by the gunmen within the school premises or in the suicide vests that the terrorists were wearing. The terrorists were in contact with their handlers during the attack, but soon after the SSG had moved in, the security forces intercepted the terrorists' communications.

At a press conference, Major-General Bajwa would later state, "We know who they are and who they were in contact with but details cannot be shared due to operation reasons. They were aware of locations and they must have carried out the recon of the area. And it is highly possible that someone from inside might have tipped them off."

== Victims ==
An estimated total of 1,099 people and teaching staff were present on the school premises. Responding forces were successful in rescuing approximately 960, though 139 were injured. 149 people were killed, including 132 children and 9 school staff members.

The provincial Government of Khyber Pakhtunkhwa announced PKR 3,164,000 (US$11,300 approx.) as compensation to the kin of each of the deceased in the terror attack and PKR 200,000 (US$1,130 approx.) to the seriously injured.

== Responsibility ==
The Tehrik-i-Taliban Pakistan (TTP) claimed responsibility for the attack, describing it as revenge for Operation Zarb-e-Azb, the Pakistani military's offensive in North Waziristan that started in summer 2014.

TTP spokesman Muhammad Omar Khorasani said that "we targeted the school because the Army targets our families. We want them to feel our pain.", "Our six fighters successfully entered the Army school and we are giving them instructions from outside," said Khorasani by phone. During the massacre, Khorasani also said, "Our suicide bombers have entered the school, they have instructions not to harm the children, but to target the Army personnel. It's a revenge attack for the Army offensive in North Waziristan." Later though the Taliban claimed contrary by putting out a statement saying, "More than 50 sons of important army officers were killed after being identified." The attacks were mainly coordinated by TTP leaders operating in Afghanistan. Moustafa Seyan Sediqyar was later killed in a drone strike in Afghanistan on 9 July 2016.

On 18 December 2014, a video was released by TTP on their website showing a man named Umar Mansoor revealing that he was the mastermind behind the Peshawar School attack. However, the Pakistan government officials commented that the planning of the attack was actually carried out by Saddam Jan, who was instructed by Umar Mansoor on behalf of Maulana Fazlullah. On 26 December 2014 at midnight, Jan was hunted and killed by the special forces in Khyber Agency in a secret hideout alongside six unidentified high-value targets.

=== Nationalities of the terrorists ===
The Pakistani intelligence community conducted an investigation to determine the nationalities of the terrorists, whom the FIA determined were all foreign fighters. The pictures of six of the gunmen were released by the Pakistani Taliban:

- Abu Shamil (also went by Abdur Rehman) — a Chechen fighter and thought to be the ringleader of the group.
- Nouman Shah Helmand — an Afghan citizen from Helmand Province; the U.S. had placed a $500,000 bounty upon Nouman.
- Wazir Alam Herat — an Afghan citizen from Herat.
- Khatib al-Zubaidi — an Egyptian citizen.
- Mohammad Zahedi — a Moroccan citizen.
- Jibran al-Saeedi — a Saudi citizen.

The SIM card of the mobile phone that was used by the terrorists was found to be registered to a woman from Hasilpur, Punjab.

== Reactions ==
I have decided to proceed to Peshawar and I will supervise the operation myself. These are my children and it is my loss.

— Nawaz Sharif, Prime Minister of Pakistan

The attack sparked widespread reactions in Pakistan, receiving condemnations from public, government, political and religious entities, journalists, and other members of Pakistani society. Pakistani media reacted strongly to the event, with major newspapers, news channels and many commentators calling for renewed and strong action against militants, especially against the TTP.

International reaction to the attack was also widespread, with many countries and international organizations condemning the attack and expressing their condolences to the families of the victims. Many important personalities around the world also condemned the attack.

Prime Minister Nawaz Sharif condemned the attack, calling it a national tragedy and announced a three-day mourning period during which the national flag would fly at half mast. President Mamnoon Hussain and chief ministers of four provinces reacted strongly to the attack and condemned it.

Major Pakistani political entities denounced and heavily condemned the attack on innocent children, calling for a strong reaction against the militants. Pakistan Tehreek-e-Insaf leader Imran Khan called off the ongoing Azadi March protest in respect for the victims.

Nobel Peace Prize winner Malala Yousafzai condemned the attack, saying in a statement: "I am heartbroken by this senseless and cold-blooded act of terror in Peshawar that is unfolding before us". Her father, Ziauddin Yousafzai said his "heart is bleeding" and his family is "traumatized" over the Peshawar school massacre.

The terrorist organization al-Qaeda's spokesperson said that "Our hearts are bursting with pain" and that the soldiers should be targeted, not their children.

Following the attack, Pakistani authorities launched crackdowns on Afghan refugee settlements to apprehend illegal immigrants. During the period, at least 30,000 Afghans left for Afghanistan, out of which close to 2,000 were deported due to a lack of legal documentation.

== Aftermath ==
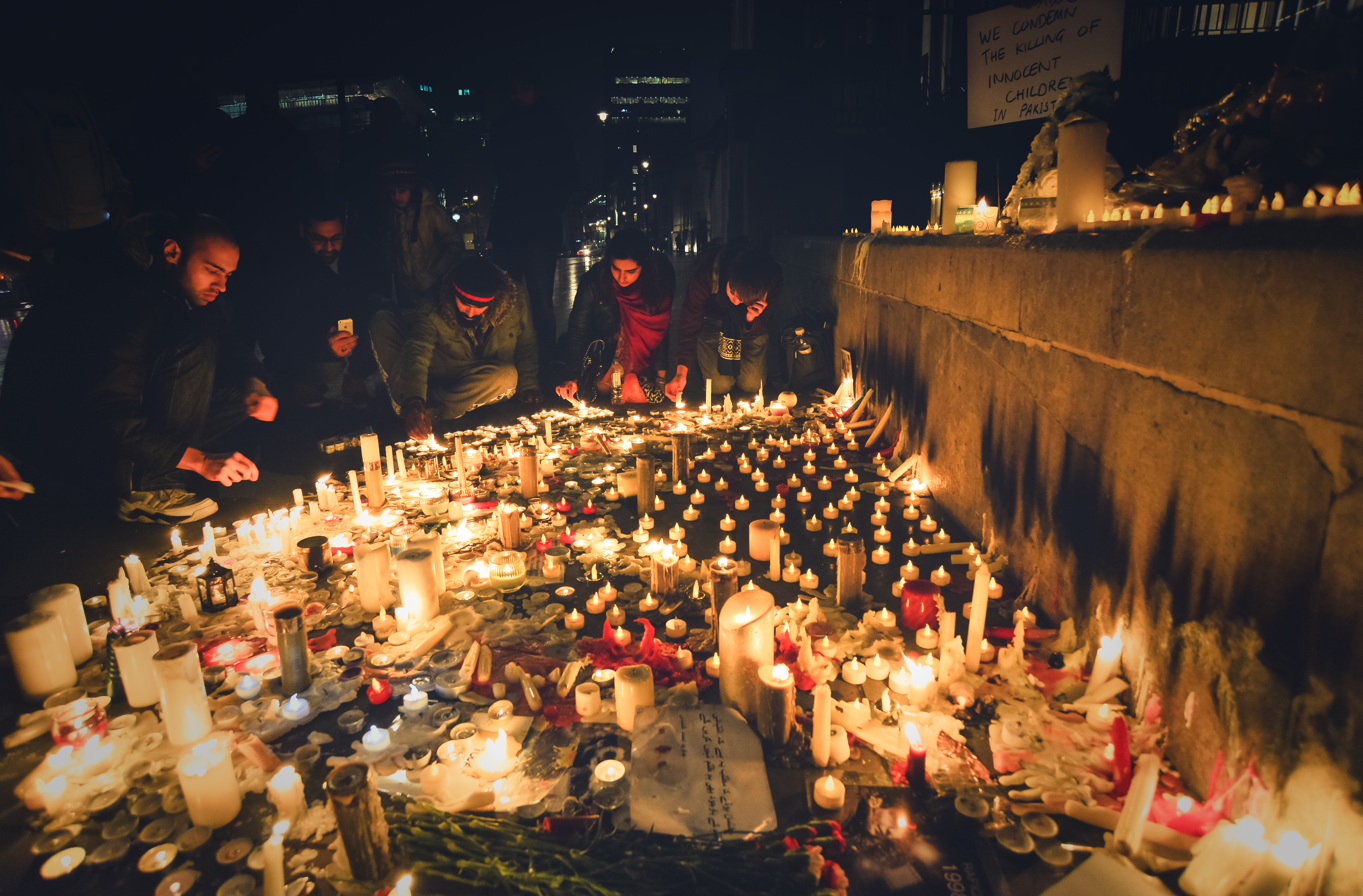
Candlelight vigil in London, UK for the victims of the terrorist attack

Many international media organizations referred to the attack as Pakistan's "9/11". The popular opinion was one of anger against the TTP soon after the attacks. Pakistan's Government and its Armed Forces showed immediate reaction to the incident.

According to the Iranian-American scholar, Vali Nasr, "the Taliban may be trying to slacken the resolve of the military by suggesting that there could be a tremendous human costs to the military offensive and create public pressure on the military to back off from this offensive, but it may actually ricochet on them."

On the second day after the attack, the moratorium on capital punishment was lifted in terror-related cases by Nawaz Sharif after which Mohammed Aqeel along with Arshad Mehmood, convicted for a failed assassination attempt on the previous President, General Pervez Musharraf, were executed on 19 December.

Protesters in Pakistan's capital Islamabad surrounded a pro-Taliban mosque and reclaimed the space.

A series of candle vigils were held throughout Pakistan in solidarity with the victims. A number of international communities recorded their protest to condemn the attack.

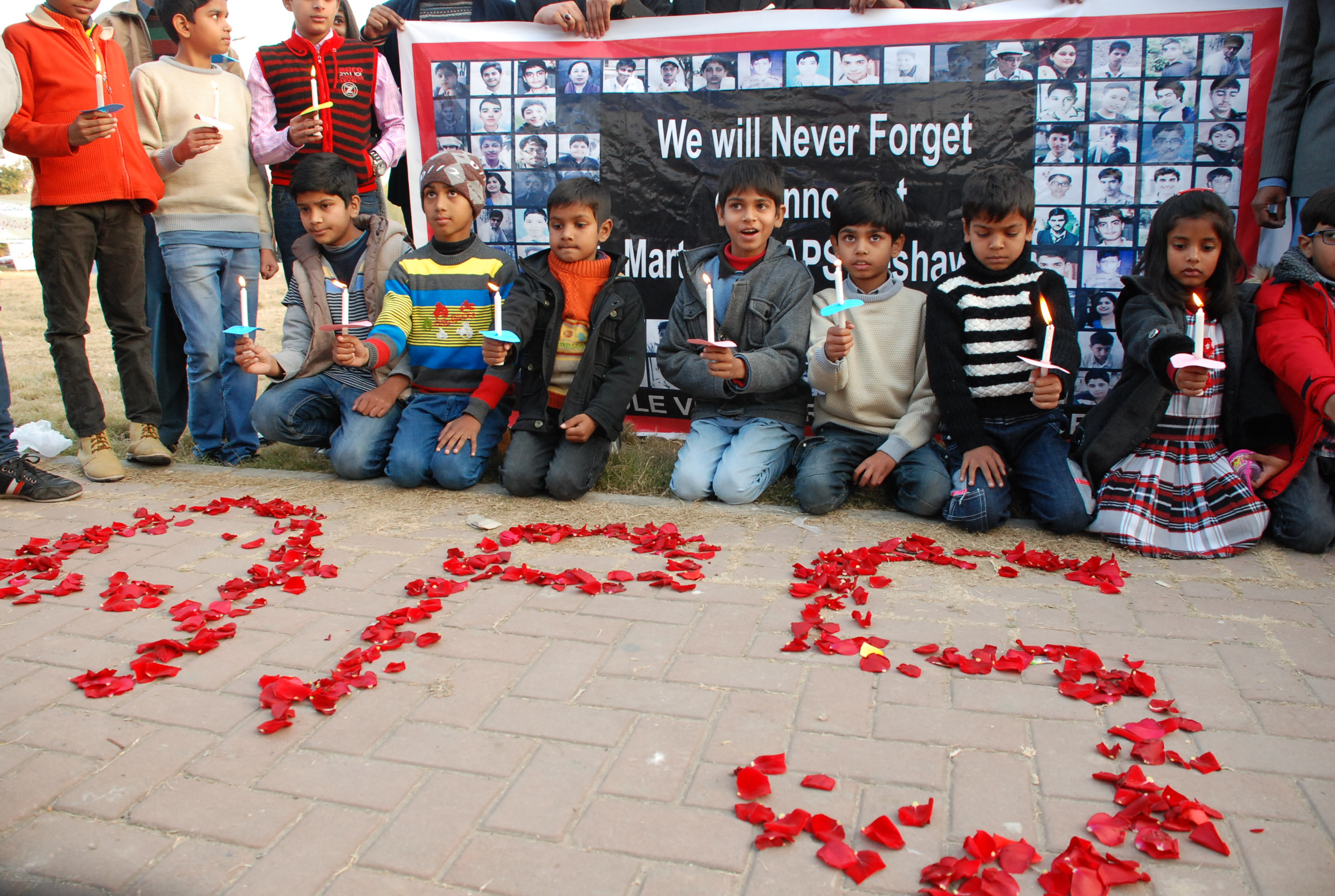
Children in Islamabad commemorating the 4th anniversary of the Peshawar school massacre

On 30 December 2014, Pakistani batsman Younis Khan visited the school. The Pakistani team played a test match against New Zealand on the second day after the massacre. Younis Khan handed over cricket kits and a cheque sent by the New Zealand cricket team.

In 2015, Pakistan renamed 107 schools after school children killed during the massacre in the Khyber Pakhtunkhwa region.

The 2015 video game Pakistan Army Retribution is set during the Peshawar school massacre. After a negative review on the website of DAWN, people on Twitter also outed their criticism on the game. Pakistan Army Retribution was pulled from the Google Play Store in January 2016.

=== Reopening ===
The Army Public School Peshawar was reopened on 12 January 2015 under the guard of Pakistan's security forces. To uplift the morale and spirit of the students and victims of the school, the Chief of Army Staff, General Raheel Sharif, personally attended the morning assembly of the school and confirmed to them that no such incident will ever occur in Pakistan again as they will break the backbone of the Taliban.

=== Lifting of moratorium on executions of terrorists ===
On 17 December 2014, Prime Minister Nawaz Sharif approved paperwork to remove the moratorium on the death penalty in terrorism cases. Sources from the Prime Minister's Secretariat stated: "The Prime Minister has approved abolishment of moratorium on the execution of death penalty in terrorism-related cases."

Pakistan has had a moratorium on executions since 2008. Currently there are approximately 800 people on death row in Pakistan in terrorism related cases. The move comes following the widely held perception that militants are never brought to justice in Pakistan. Some reports suggest judges and witnesses are too scared to come forward and award due sentences to prisoners accused of terrorism. And even when militants are convicted and sent to prison, the frail policing system of Pakistan has seen many jailbreaks, including the Bannu and Dera Ismail Khan jailbreaks, in which many high-profile TTP members escaped.

David Griffiths, Deputy Director for Amnesty International Asia-Pacific opposed the decision, saying "Resorting to the death penalty is not the answer – it is never the answer. This is where the government should focus its energies, rather than perpetuating the cycle of violence with the resumption of executions."

=== Anniversaries and memorials ===
Yearly anniversary tributes are held in Peshawar, Pakistan with prayers, memorials and candlelight vigils. The main ceremony is held at the Peshawar Army Public School, with the parents of victims and Pakistani army officers in attendance, with portraits of victims displayed in the school and along the road into the city. From the first anniversary of the massacre, Pakistan Children's Day was moved to 16 December.

ISPR released the songs "Bara Dushman Bana Phirta Hai", "Mujhe Dushman Ke Bachon Ko Parhana Hai", and "Humain Agay Hi Jana Hai", featuring Sahir Ali Bagga, to pay tribute to the victims. Ali Zafar collaborated with The Citizens Foundation to establish 141 Schools for Peace, one each in dedication of a victim, and released his song "Urain Ge".

=== Turning of public opinion ===
The massacre heavily influenced public opinion on insurgent groups in Pakistan such as the TTP, which previously enjoyed moderate support from the residents of KPK and other areas where government support was waning. Many were horrified by the mass killing of children, and sympathy for insurgent groups rapidly declined over the following months.

The massacre also marked an escalation in the violence of TTP-backed terrorism, with subsequent attacks showing the same disregard for civilian lives. This further eroded public opinion over the course of the next decade.

== Retaliation ==
=== Retaliatory UAV and air-strikes ===
After the attack, the combined unmanned aerial vehicle (UAV) and air-strikes on TTP members were geared up, and the Pakistan Air Force (PAF) intensified efforts to locate Tehrik-i-Taliban Pakistan (TTP) chief Mullah Fazlullah, who narrowly escaped a UAV strike on 25 November. On 17 December, the PAF's F-16s and JF-17s jets engaged in bombings against TTP positions in the Tirah Valley, close to the Afghan-Pakistani border targeting 57 TTP members. Twenty additional aerial bombing missions were carried out using dynamic targeting. On 16 December, a United States CIA UAV strike killed four TTP members in eastern Afghanistan.

On 20 December, another UAV strike targeted and killed five suspected TTP members in North Waziristan, and according to officials the death toll was expected to rise. During the same time, around 21 TTP members were reportedly killed by PAF strikes in Khyber Agency as they attempted to escape to Afghanistan. On 20 December 2014, an unconfirmed media report stated that Fazlullah was killed by PAF air-strikes in Afghanistan. Air Intelligence and the Ministry of Defence (MoD) have not commented on the report; no official response was given by Inter-Services Public Relations (ISPR) over the reports.

Mastermind of the attack, Umar Mansoor, was reported to have been wounded in a United States drone strike in Paktia Province of Afghanistan on 17 October 2017. He was shifted to an undisclosed location and reportedly succumbed to his injuries. TTP confirmed his death in a statement sent to journalists through e-mail and added that Khalifa Usman Mansoor will replace him as the new commander for the areas of Darra Adam Khel and Peshawar.

=== Targeted killings of Tehrik-i-Taliban members ===
Reports were circulating widely in televised news media about law enforcement agencies tracking down the militants and targeting TTP operatives in a series of police encounters taking place in all over the country. After the school attack, Pakistani intelligence agencies chased down and apprehended four TTP terrorists in Quetta, before they could make their escape to Afghanistan. In a police encounter with Karachi Metro Police and the Crime Investigation Department (CID), the TTP leader, Abid Muchar, was chased and gunned down along with his three associates in Musharraf Colony. In a separate action in Karachi, the CID teams, in a high-speed chase in Hawke's Bay Beach, pursued and apprehended five members of Al-Qaeda's South Asian chapter who are suspected of planning an attack on Karachi Naval Dockyard in September. On 20 December, a team of Pakistan Rangers personnel raided a safe house in Manghopir area of Karachi and killed five members of the TTP in a shootout.

During the afternoon of 20 December, the Khyber Pakhtunkhwa Police (KP Police) and the special agents of the Federal Investigation Agency (FIA) raided a safe house in Shabqadar, a town located 30 km (19 mi) north of Peshawar. In an exchange of fire at the safe house, the KPK police and other law enforcement agencies gunned down the six TTP fighters, including their commander and two other high-value targets who assisted in the school attack. Acting on Pakistani Military Intelligence information, Special Service Group Navy (SSGN) teams were inserted into the secret hideout in Khyber Agency and stalked the six terrorists led by Saddam Jan — the mastermind of the Army Public School attack. In a late night operation, the SSGN teams reportedly killed Jan along with his six militants. An unnamed senior Pakistan Government official confirmed the report.

On 9 January 2015, the CID teams gunned down four Al-Qaeda operatives after another high-speed car chase took place in Qayyumabad in Karachi. In another separate midnight action in Lahore, teams of FIA agents, assisted by the Punjab Police, raided a house located in Burki Road. After an almost two-hour gun battle, the FIA agents gunned down Roohullah (alias: Asadullah) – the mastermind of the Wagah border attack – along with three of his associates. Since the attack on the school, the FIA had been on the hunt for Roohullah, and he was finally killed in a police encounter in Lahore.

=== Communications with Afghanistan and ISAF ===
On 17 December, Pakistan's Chief of Army Staff General Raheel Sharif, accompanied by the Director General of the Inter-Services Intelligence, Lieutenant-General Rizwan Akhtar, went to Kabul to meet with Afghan President Ashraf Ghani and General John F. Campbell, the commander of American and NATO forces in Afghanistan. According to news sources in Pakistan, General Raheel asked for the handover of the TTP leadership and asked the Afghan government to act against hideouts of the Taliban operatives in its territory. At the meeting with Afghan officials, General Raheel delivered a message to Afghan National Army's Chief of Staff, Lieutenant General Sher Mohammad Karimi, "to take decisive action against sanctuaries of the TTP or else Pakistan would go for a hot pursuit." One intelligence official confirmed the message relayed to the Afghan president and reportedly cautioned that "if Afghan authorities fail to act this time, we will explore all options, including hot pursuit." In further talks, General Raheel told the Afghan president that "Pakistan's military could eliminate TTP's sanctuaries in Kunar and Nuristan Province on its own but was showing restraint due to Afghanistan's sovereignty and territorial integrity." President Ghani assured General Raheel that his country would take all the necessary steps to root out the militants. A joint operation against the Taliban was also discussed with the Afghan leadership. In a media report published in The Nation, Prime Minister Nawaz Sharif of Pakistan released a separate statement to Afghan president on a "hot pursuit" and has sent a message to Kabul reportedly stressing: "Wipe out Taliban or we will."

The Pakistani military went into active pursuit in the form of manhunt missions after the attack. On the night of 18 December, the Pakistani military pursued the militants and immediately launched a simultaneous ground offensive in the Khyber Agency and the Tirah Valley when the terrorists were on the run to Afghanistan. In the assault, there were reports that some Taliban militants had fled and had left behind the bodies of their dead– photos of which circulated on social media. In a separate air strike in Khyber Agency on the same night, the PAF's fighter aircraft reportedly killed a top commander and 17 other militants who were attempting to relocate to Afghanistan.

On 14 January 2015, five men were arrested in Afghanistan over suspicion of being involved in the attack in Afghanistan by Afghan security forces after the Pakistani authorities provided intelligence information. On 9 July 2016, the mastermind of the attack Khalid Khurasani was confirmed dead in a U.S. drone strike in Nangarhar, Afghanistan.

=== 21st Amendment to the Constitution of Pakistan ===
On 6 January 2015, both houses of the Parliament of Pakistan unanimously passed the "Constitution (Twenty-First Amendment) Act 2015", which was signed into law by the President on 7 January 2015. The Amendment provided a constitutional cover to the military courts that were established in the country for speedy trials of those involved in the attack. The Amendment contained a "sunset" clause and ceased to be part of the Constitution after two years on 7 January 2017.

== In popular culture ==
Peshawar is a 2020 Indian Hindi-language web series by Ullu. It is based on the attack and focuses on the background of the incident. Ashmit Patel portrayed Abu Shamil, the Chechen militant who masterminded the attack and was ringleader of the group.

The School Bag, a 2017 Indian short film by Dheeraj Jindal is also based on the attack.

== See also ==
- Beslan school siege
- 2017 Peshawar Agriculture Directorate attack
- Bacha Khan University attack
- 2013 Lahore bombing
- 2014 Rada' bombings
- PTI do-or-die protest
- List of hostage crises
- Uzbek and Chechen terrorism in Pakistan
- Operation Zarb-e-Azb
- Terrorist incidents in Pakistan in 2014
- List of terrorist incidents, 2014
- Army Public Schools & Colleges System
- List of massacres in Pakistan
