= Jamaat-ul-Ahrar =

AQ-linked splinter group of the Pakistani Taliban

- جماعة الأحرار
- Jihadist flags, which were used by the group multiple times
- Leaders: Leader: Omar Mukaram Khurasani; Former spokesman: Ehsanullah Ehsan (surrendered); Former leader: Omar Khalid Khorasani †
- Dates active: August 2014 – present
- Allegiance: Islamic State – Khorasan Province (August 2014–March 2015); Tehrik-i-Taliban Pakistan (2020 - 2025)
- Group: Ahrar-ul-Hind
- Headquarters: Nangarhar Province, Afghanistan (formerly)
- Active regions: Pakistan; Afghanistan
- Ideology: Jihadism
- Part of: Tehrik-i-Taliban Pakistan (2020 - 2025)
- Wars: the War in North-West Pakistan and the Global War on Terrorism

Jamaat-ul-Ahrar (Arabic: جماعة الأحرار, romanized: Jamā‘at ul-Āḥrār, "Assembly of the Free," abbreviated as JuA) is an al-Qaeda-linked splinter faction of the Tehreek-e-Taliban Pakistan (TTP, or Pakistani Taliban) that was formed in August 2014. Omar Khalid Khorasani, the JuA's founding leader, had close links to al-Qaeda and its leader Ayman al-Zawahiri. The organization is internationally designated as a terrorist group.

The JuA came to prominence after it claimed responsibility for the 2014 Wagah border suicide attack. Relations between JuA and the TTP have long been contentious and marked by recurring rifts. In August 2014, Omar Khalid Khorasani split from the Pakistani Taliban and announced the formation of Jamaat ul-Ahrar. In September 2014, JuA issued a statement denouncing the Pakistani Taliban leadership and declared its support to the Islamic State militant group.

JuA initiated a reconciliation process with the TTP in 2015 and remerged with the Pakistani Taliban in August 2020. Starting from 2023, amid growing rifts with the TTP's Central Shura Council and leadership disputes with Mufti Noor Wali Mehsud, the group has carried out attacks independently and has resumed operating separately from the Pakistani Taliban since 2025. In May 2026, intense clashes between the TTP and JuA erupted in the Kurram region, in which 19 JuA fighters and 3 TTP members were killed.

== History ==
=== Roots and development ===
In September 2014, Tehrik-i-Taliban Pakistan chief Fazlullah ousted Mohmand Agency chief Omar Khalid Khorasani (former leader of Ahrar-ul-Hind). Omar Khalid Khorasani and his associates in Mohmand Agency had accused the TTP leadership of deviating from the TTP ideology, leading to the formation of splinter group TTP Jamaat-ul-Ahrar.

The Tehrik-i-Taliban Pakistan was effectively divided into two factions. The original TTP is headed by Maulana Fazlullah, who was elected in November 2013 following the killing of ex-chief Hakimullah Mehsud in a U.S. drone strike. In February 2014, Ahrar-ul-Hind, headed by Umar Qasmi (former leader in the Lashkar-e-Jhangvi) was formed after TTP opened peace talks with the Pakistani government. It later merged into Jamaat-ul-Ahrar, a second splinter group that broke away from Tehreek-i-Taliban in Pakistan on 4 September 2014, and named Omar Khalid Khorasani as its commander.

=== Relations with TTP ===
The group had announced they would no longer recognize or obey Mullah Fazlullah as their Emir. In March 2015, the group's spokesman announced that it was considering to swear loyalty to main TTP leadership again.

JuA initiated a reconciliation process with the TTP in 2015 and remerged with the Pakistani Taliban in August 2020. Starting from 2023, amid growing rifts with the TTP's Central Shura Council and leadership disputes with Mufti Noor Wali Mehsud, the group has carried out attacks independently and has resumed operating separately from the Pakistani Taliban since 2025. In May 2026, intense clashes between the TTP and JuA erupted in the Kurram region, in which 19 JuA fighters and 3 TTP members were killed.

== Designation as terrorist organization ==
On 6 July 2017, the Security Council's 1267 Sanctions Committee approved the addition of Jamaat-ul-Ahrar in the list of entities and individuals subject to the assets freeze, travel ban and arms embargo. Pakistan had proposed this listing. It was designated as a Global Terrorist Organization under the SDN by the United States Department of the Treasury's Office of Foreign Assets Control, with addresses in Mohmand District, Bajaur District, Khyber District, Orakzai District, Charsadda, Peshawar, Swat, Punjab Province, Pakistan.

== Organizational structure ==
=== Leaders ===
- Omar Khalid Khorasani (also known as Abdul Wali) previously led a faction called Ahrar-ul-Hind. He was also one of the founding members of the TTP and was a former journalist from Mohmand agency. It was reported that a JuA spokesman Asad Mansoor had told AFP news agency that Khorasani on 18 October 2017 had succumbed to his injuries received in a United States drone strike in Paktia Province of Afghanistan. Pajhwok Afghan News however stated that a source close to the group had denied his death. Long War Journal reported that a statement on Telegram issued under Khorasani's name denied his death, while confirming the death of Khalifa Umar Mansour. The outlet noted that the spokesman operating the group's Telegram account did not announce his death. His death also was not confirmed by United States. Reports of Khorasani's death were proven false when the United States added Khorasani to the U.S State Department's Rewards for Justice wanted list on March 7, 2018. On 11 December 2020 Ziaulhaq Amarkhil the Governor of Nangarhar Province claimed on his Twitter account that Abdul Wali was killed by National Directorate of Security in the Chaparhar District although his death was not confirmed by the United States. Abdul Wali was killed in a blast caused by a roadside mine on 7 August 2022 in Barmal District, Paktika Province, Afghanistan.

=== Spokesmen ===
- Asad Mansoor

==== Former ====
- Ehsanullah Ehsan, he surrendered himself to Pakistan's Security Forces in April 2017 and escaped from his detention in February 2020.

== Operation Khyber-1 ==
On 9 November, at least 13 militants were killed in security forces' offensive in Akakhel which included among the dead two suicide bombers and a key commander. Ehsan confirmed that their key commander Abu Jandal was killed during the 9 November bombing in Khyber Agency's Tirah Valley.

== Claimed and alleged attacks ==
- (Punjab, Pakistan) 2 November 2014, Jamaat-ul-Ahrar spokesman Ehsanullah Ehsan claimed responsibility for the Wagah border attack in a telephone call to Dawn from Afghanistan. "Some other groups have claimed responsibility of this attack, but these claims are baseless. We will soon release the video of this attack," he said. "This attack is revenge for the killing of innocent people in North Waziristan."
- (Federally Administered Tribal Areas) 7 November 2014, Jamaat-ul-Ahrar claimed responsibility for twin bombings that killed at least six people in Mohmand Agency. The bombs targeted peace committee volunteers in Chinari village of Safi Tehsil. Ehsanullah Ehsan claimed responsibility and vowed to continue attacking tribal peace committees.
- 21 November 2014, Jamaat-ul-Ahrar claimed responsibility for a grenade attack on the membership camp of Muttahida Qaumi Movement (MQM) in Orangi Town area of Karachi. Three members of the Sindh Assembly and 50 workers were injured.
- (Punjab, Pakistan) 15 March 2015, Jamaat-ul-Ahrar claimed responsibility for twin bombings at a Roman Catholic church and Christ Church during Sunday service at Youhanabad town of Lahore. At least 15 people were killed and seventy were wounded in the attacks.
- (Khyber Pakhtunkhwa) 29 December 2015, Jamaat-ul-Ahrar claimed responsibility for the Mardan suicide bombing, killing 29 and injuring more than 50 others in Mardan, Pakistan.
- (Khyber Pakhtunkhwa) 7 March 2016, Jamaat-ul-Ahrar claimed responsibility for a suicide bombing that left 11 dead and 15 wounded after a man blew himself up outside a district court in Shabqadar in the Charsadda District.
- (Punjab, Pakistan) 27 March 2016, Jamaatul Ahrar claimed responsibility for the suicide attack in a park in Lahore targeting members of the Christian community who were celebrating Easter. The nail-filled device near a children's playground killed over 70 people, reportedly mostly Muslim. It was described as an attempt by the group "to establish itself as the most aggressive and violent" Islamist group in Pakistan.
- (Federally Administered Tribal Areas) On 16 September 2016, Jamaat-ul-Ahrar claimed the responsibility of suicide attack in a local mosque of Tehsil Amabar in Mohmand Agency, the attack killed at least 28 people and left 31 injured. In an emailed statement, TTP Jamaat-ul-Ahrar spokesperson, Ehsanullah Ehsan, said a suicide bomber targeted the peace committee.
- (Punjab, Pakistan) On 13 February 2017, Jamaat-ul-Ahrar claimed their involvement in a suicide attack targeting senior police officials at a protest on Lahore's Mall Road. The attack left 13 people dead and injured 31 others. The dead include 6 police officials, including DIG City Traffic Police Lahore Ahmad Mobin Zaidi and Acting DIG (Operations) Zahid Gondal. The terrorist outfit sent a text message to claim their responsibility and later released a video message to warn off future attacks.
- (Khyber Pakhtunkhwa) On 31 March 2017, Jamaat-ul-Ahraar claimed responsibility of an attack in Parachinar that killed 24 and injured 68 people.

== Split ==
Jamaat-ul-Ahrar was split into two groups, with a video statement on 12 November 2017 announcing that the Hizbul Ahrar group, formed in Nangarhar province of Afghanistan on 11 November, will be headed by militant commander Mukarram Khan. Khan had previously served as an important commander and spokesman of JuA. The statement said that Khan left JuA because of differences with its chief over "attacks against minority Christians, killing civilians, extortion, kidnapping for ransom and other acts he deemed un-Islamic". Since then, Hizbul Ahrar has claimed numerous attacks against police officers and army men, the modus operandi of the group is mainly targeted assassinations and IED blasts.

== See also ==
- 2023 Peshawar mosque bombing
- Ehsanullah Ehsan
- Tehreek-i-Taliban Pakistan
- Fazlullah
- Operation Black Thunderstorm
- Operation Zarb-e-Azb
- War in North-West Pakistan
