= Omar Khalid Khorasani =

Pakistani militant (died 2022)

- Born: Abdul Wali Mohmand; 1977; Mohmand Agency, Tribal areas, Pakistan
- Died: 7 August 2022 (aged 44–45); Barmal District, Paktika Province, Afghanistan
- Military career
- Allegiance: Tehrik-i-Taliban Pakistan (until 2014, 2015–2022); Jamaat-ul-Ahrar (2014–2020); Islamic State — Khorasan Province (2014–2015)
- Conflicts: Insurgency in Khyber Pakhtunkhwa †

Abdul Wali Mohmand; (c. 1977 – 7 August 2022), known as Omar Khalid Khorasani was a Pakistani militant and one of the founding members of the Tehrik-i-Taliban Pakistan (TTP). In 2014, he formed his own splinter militant group called Jamaat-ul-Ahrar (JuA) and was ousted by the Mullah Fazlullah-led Taliban. The same year, JuA swore allegiance to Islamic State (ISIS), however, a year later JuA rejoined TTP.

On 7 March 2018, Khorasani was added to the U.S. State Department's Rewards for Justice wanted list with a bounty up to $3 million. His name is also featured in the 'Red Book of Most Wanted High Profile Terrorists' published by Pakistan's Federal Investigation Agency. He was killed in a blast caused by a roadside mine on 7 August 2022 in Barmal District, Paktika province, Afghanistan.

== Personal life ==
Omar Khalid Khorasani was born in Mohmand Agency, Pakistan. He was formerly a journalist and a poet. He studied at a number of religious schools in Karachi, Pakistan. His real name was Abdul Wali Mohmand.

== Militant activity ==
Khorasani was one of the founding members of Tehreek-i-Taliban Pakistan (TTP). Within organisational circles he was known as a formidable military commander and waged a bloody campaign against the government forces in Khyber agency.

In 2014, Khorasani formed his own splinter militant group called Jamaat-ul-Ahrar (JuA). The same year he was ousted by Mullah Fazlullah-led TTP for forming his own splinter group. Khorasani was a key player in break up of TTP, with one part of the outfit being led by Fazlullah, and the other being headed by himself.

Under the leadership of Khorasani, Jamaat-ul-Ahrar (JuA), swore allegiance to Islamic State (ISIS) group in 2014. However, a year later, JuA rejoined Taliban.

According to Rewards for Justice Program (RFJ) website, Khorasani reportedly operated from Nangarhar and Kunar provinces of Afghanistan.

Before his death, Khorasani was described as one of the very senior TTP commanders and was second only to Noor Wali Mehsud in TTP leadership hierarchy.

== Death ==
Khorasani along with two other senior TTP commanders and one personal driver were killed when their vehicle struck a roadside mine on 7 August 2022 in Barmal District, Paktika Province, Afghanistan. The two other senior TTP commanders were identified to be Hafiz Dawlat and Mufti Hassan. They were based in Afghanistan's Kunar and Nangarhar provinces and were travelling to Barmal district when their vehicle struck a roadside mine.

Khorasani's death was confirmed by a TTP spokesperson and his funeral was announced to be held in Shukari area of Sarkano district of Kunar province.

=== Previous reports of death ===
In 2015, Khorasani was seriously injured in a NATO airstrike in eastern Afghanistan. However, Khorasani was able to recover from his injuries.

It was reported that a JuA spokesman, Asad Mansoor, had told AFP news agency that Khorasani on 18 October 2017 had succumbed to his injuries which he received in a United States drone strike in Paktia Province of Afghanistan. Pajhwok Afghan News however stated that a source close to the group had denied his death. Long War Journal reported that a statement on Telegram issued under Khorasani's name denied his death, while confirming the death of Khalifa Umar Mansour. The outlet noted that the spokesman operating the group's Telegram account did not announce his death. His death also was not confirmed by the United States.

== See also ==
- Operation Zarb-e-Azb
