= History of the War in Afghanistan (2001–2021) =

This article summarizes the history of the War in Afghanistan (2001–2021).

== 1978–2001: Prelude ==
In 2001, Afghanistan had been at war for over 20 years. The communist People's Democratic Party of Afghanistan (PDPA) seized power in 1978, and its policies sparked a popular uprising. The Soviet Union, sensing PDPA weakness, intervened in 1979 to support the regime. The entry of the Soviet Union into Afghanistan prompted its Cold War rivals, especially the United States and Saudi Arabia, to support rebels fighting against the Soviet-backed PDPA. While the secular and socialist government controlled the cities, religiously motivated mujahideen held sway in much of the countryside. The most important mujahideen commander was Ahmad Shah Massoud, who led the well-organized Tajik forces. The American Central Intelligence Agency (CIA) worked closely with Pakistan's Inter-Service Intelligence (ISI) to funnel foreign support for the mujahideen. The war also attracted Arab volunteers, known as "Afghan Arabs", including Osama bin Laden.

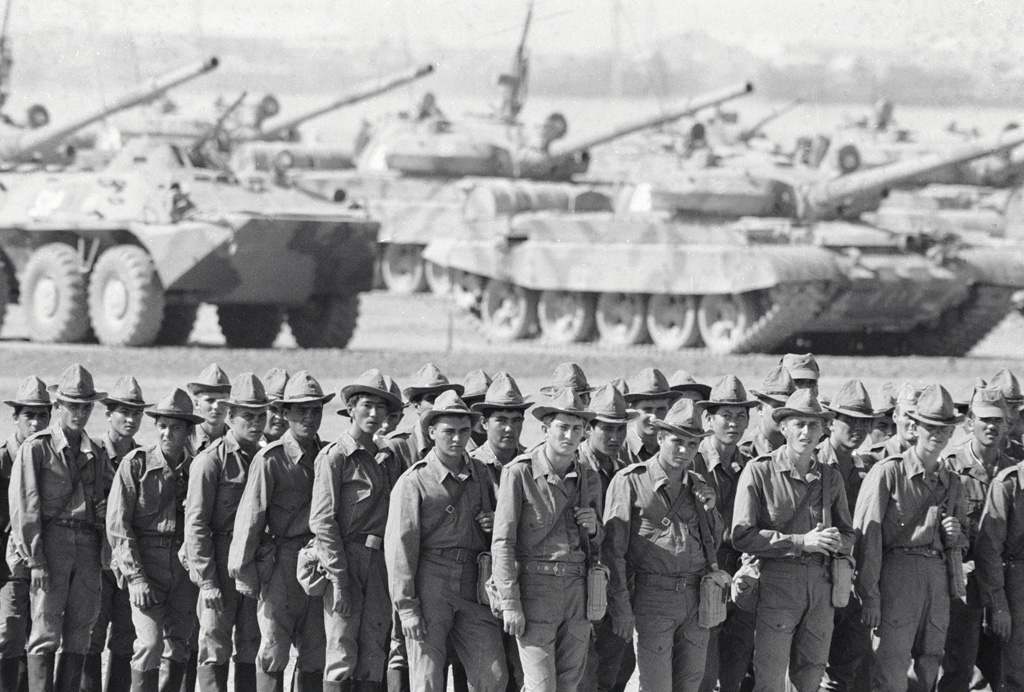
Soviet troops in 1986 during the Soviet–Afghan War

After the withdrawal of the Soviet military from Afghanistan in February 1989, the PDPA regime collapsed in 1992. In the resulting power vacuum, the mujahideen leaders vied for dominance in a civil war from 1992 to 1996. By then, bin Laden had left the country. The United States' interest in Afghanistan also diminished. In 1994, a Pashtun mujahid named Mullah Omar founded the Taliban movement in Kandahar. His followers were religious students and sought to end warlord rule through strict adherence to Islamic law. By the end of 1994, the Taliban had captured all of Kandahar Province.

=== Taliban Emirate vs. Northern Alliance (1996–2001) ===
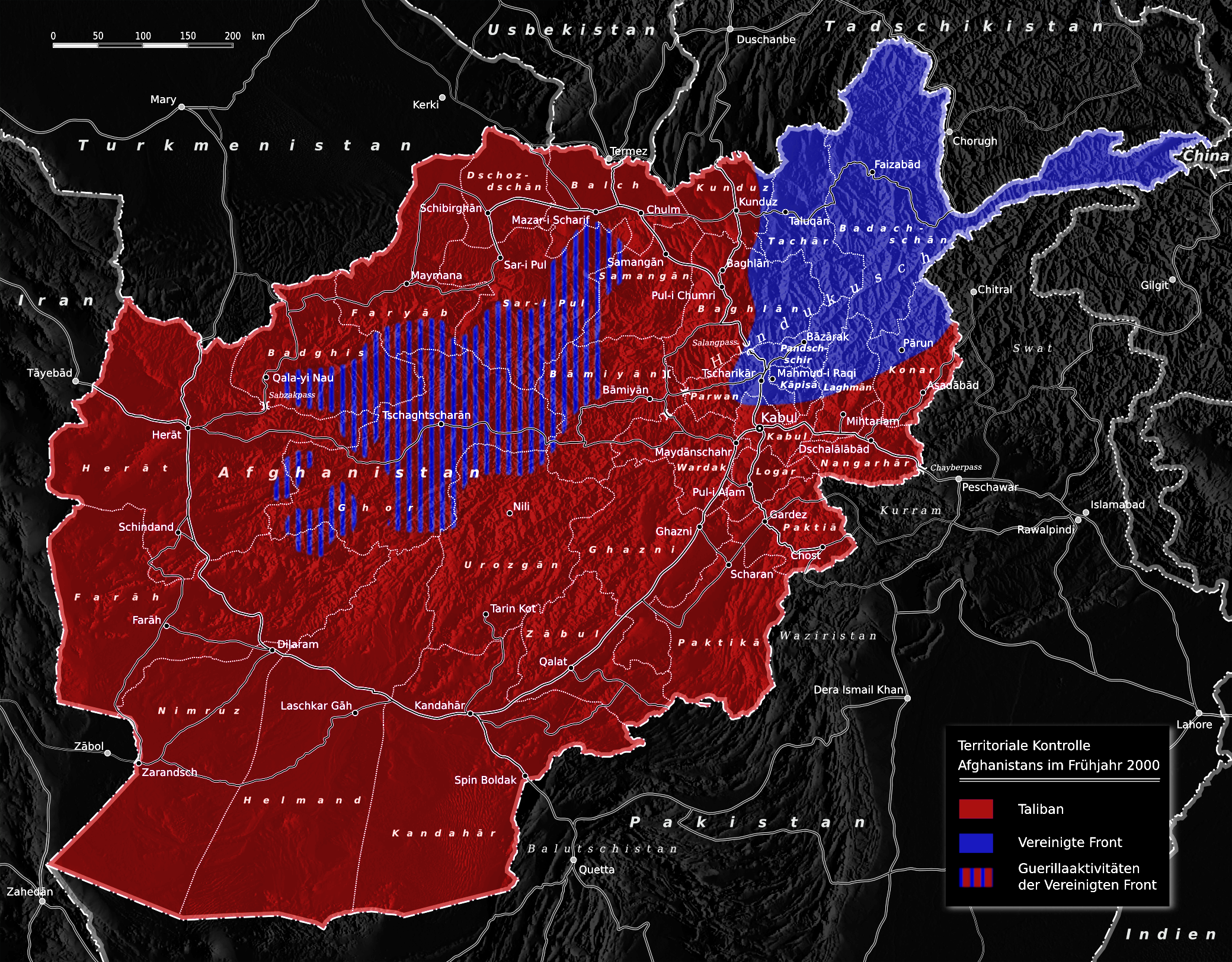
Taliban (red) and Northern Alliance (blue) control over Afghanistan in 2000

In 1996, with military support from Pakistan and financial support from Saudi Arabia, the Taliban seized Kabul and founded the Islamic Emirate of Afghanistan. They imposed their fundamentalist interpretation of Islam in areas under their control, issuing edicts forbidding women to work outside the home or attend school and requiring them to abide by harsh rules on veiling and seclusion.

After the Taliban takeover of Kabul, Massoud retreated north to his native Panjshir Valley and formed a resistance movement against the Taliban, called the United Front or the Northern Alliance. In addition to Massoud's Tajik force, the United Front included Uzbeks under the former PDPA general Abdul Rashid Dostum and Hazara factions. (Note: The Hazaras are a minority ethnic group adhering to Shia Islam who live in the mountains of central Afghanistan.) The Northern Alliance received varying degrees of support from Russia, Iran, and India. Like the Taliban, Massoud also raised money by trafficking drugs. By 2001, the Taliban controlled 80% of the country, with the Northern Alliance confined to the country's northeast corner.

=== Al-Qaeda ===
The 9/11 Commission in the US found that under the Taliban, al-Qaeda was able to use Afghanistan as a place to train and indoctrinate fighters, import weapons, coordinate with other jihadists, and plot terrorist actions. While al-Qaeda maintained its own camps in Afghanistan, it also supported training camps of other organizations. An estimated 10,000 to 20,000 men passed through these facilities before 9/11, most of whom were sent to fight for the Taliban against the United Front. A smaller number were inducted into al-Qaeda.

After the August 1998 United States embassy bombings were linked to bin Laden, President Bill Clinton ordered missile strikes on militant training camps in Afghanistan. US officials pressed the Taliban to surrender bin Laden. In 1999, the international community imposed sanctions on the Taliban, calling for bin Laden to be surrendered. The Taliban repeatedly rebuffed these demands. Central Intelligence Agency (CIA) Special Activities Division paramilitary teams were active in Afghanistan in the 1990s in clandestine operations to locate and kill or capture Osama bin Laden. These teams planned several operations but did not receive the order to proceed from President Clinton. Their efforts built relationships with Afghan leaders that proved essential in the 2001 invasion.

=== Change in US policy toward Afghanistan ===
During the early years of the Clinton administration, the US had no clear policy toward Afghanistan. The 1998 US embassy bombings, however, masterminded by al-Qaeda, provoked President Clinton to order missile strikes on militant training camps in Afghanistan; bin Laden was indicted for his involvement in the bombings. In 1999 both the US and the United Nations enacted sanctions against the Taliban in United Nations Security Council Resolution 1267, which demanded the Taliban surrender bin Laden for trial in the US and close all terrorist bases in Afghanistan. At the time, the only collaboration between Massoud and the US was an effort with the CIA to trace bin Laden. The US provided no support for Massoud's fight against the Taliban.

A change in US policy was effected in early September 2001. The Bush administration agreed on a plan to start supporting Massoud. A September 10 meeting of top national security officials agreed that the Taliban would be presented with an ultimatum to hand over bin Laden and other al-Qaeda operatives. If the Taliban refused, the US would provide covert military aid to anti-Taliban groups to attempt to overthrow the Taliban.

=== September 11 attacks ===
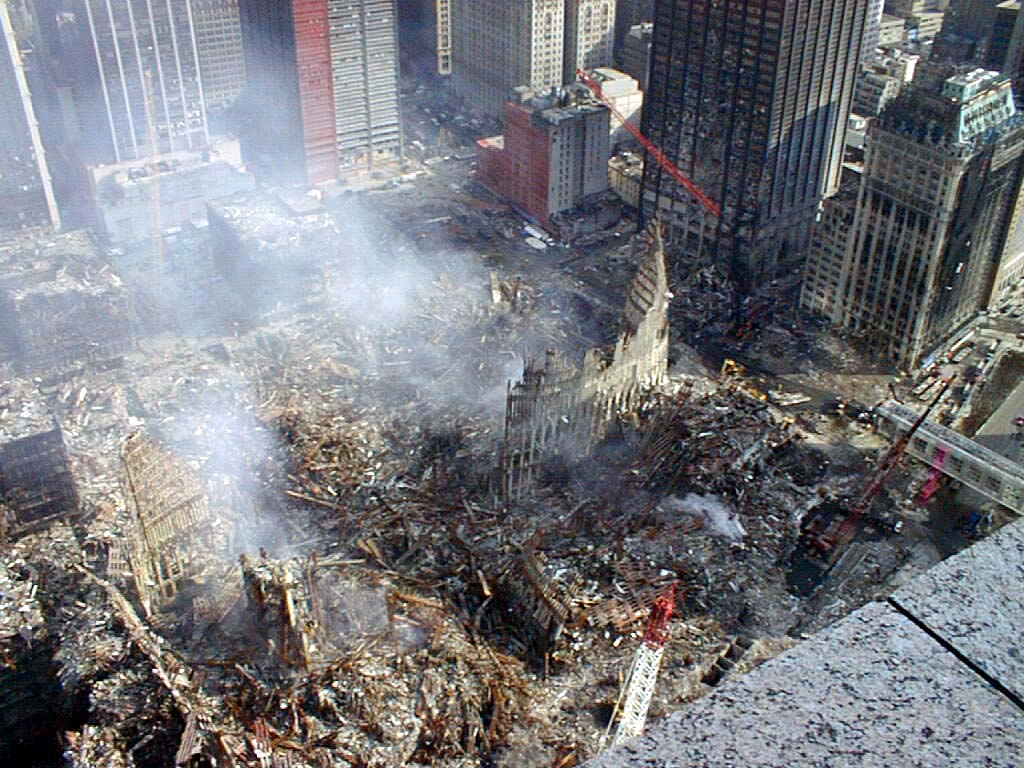
Ground Zero in New York following the attacks of 11 September 2001

On the morning of 11 September 2001, a total of 19 Arab men—15 of whom were from Saudi Arabia—carried out four coordinated attacks in the United States. Four commercial passenger jet airliners were hijacked. The hijackers intentionally crashed two of the airliners into the Twin Towers of the World Trade Center in New York City, killing everyone on board and more than 2,000 people in the buildings. Both buildings collapsed within two hours from damage related to the crashes, destroying nearby buildings and damaging others. The hijackers crashed a third airliner into the Pentagon in Arlington, Virginia, just outside Washington, D.C. The fourth plane crashed into a field near Shanksville, in rural Pennsylvania, after some of its passengers and flight crew attempted to retake control of the plane, which the hijackers had redirected toward Washington, D.C., to target the White House, or the US Capitol. No one aboard the flights survived. The death toll among responders including firefighters and police was 836 as of 2009. Total deaths were 2,996, including the 19 hijackers.

Osama Bin Laden masterminded the attacks, and the US desire to hold him accountable became the casus belli for invasion. Historian Carter Malkasian writes that "seldom in history has one man so singlehandedly provoked a war." Bin Laden sought, successfully, to draw the US into an extended war similar to that fought against the Soviets. The Taliban publicly condemned the 11 September attacks. They also greatly underestimated the US's willingness to go to war. The US was mistaken in its belief that the Taliban and al-Qaeda were almost inseparable when, in fact, they had very different goals and leaders.

=== Diplomatic and political activity ===
We will pursue nations that provide aid or safe haven to terrorism. Every nation, in every region, now has a decision to make. Either you are with us, or you are with the terrorists. From this day forward, any nation that continues to harbor or support terrorism will be regarded by the United States as a hostile regime.

– President George W. Bush addressing a Joint Session of Congress on 20 September 2001.

Immediately after the 9/11 attacks, President Bush and the United States National Security Council agreed that military action would probably have to be taken against Al-Qaeda and Afghanistan. However, Bush decided to issue an ultimatum to the Taliban first, announcing the decision in private on September 12. Mullah Omar was not informed of the decision to attack the United States by Osama bin Laden, and the Taliban had forbidden such attacks from Afghanistan and condemned it afterwards. Omar also agreed to hand over bin Laden to a third country, though the United States demanded he be extradited directly.

The Central Intelligence Agency started negotiating with the Taliban on September 15, while Bush announced his ultimatum publicly on September 20, based on the Authorization for Use of Military Force of 2001, an Act of Congress. The same day, religious scholars were meeting in Kabul, deciding that jihad was obligated if the US would invade, until they retreated. The council also decided that bin Laden should be surrendered. Meanwhile, Omar decided that “turning over Osama would only be a disgrace for us and for Islamic thought and belief would be a weakness”, and that the US would continue making demands after surrendering bin Laden, rejecting both the ultimatum and the council's advice. He claimed bin Laden was innocent and that was under his protection as a guest and due to his oath of allegiance. This decision was accepted by the rest of the Taliban, and sympathy for the Al-Qaeda existed within them.

Abdul Salam Zaeef has claimed that Omar thought there was "less than 10 percent chance" of the US attacking. He remained in Kandahar despite warnings of an immediate invasion. According to Abu Walid al-Masri, bin Laden thought that the United States could be defeated using the same methods as in the Soviet–Afghan War. Beyond the ultimatum, no high-level diplomatic line was opened by the Americans. In public opinion, 67 percent of Americans supported military action with ground troops. Bush pushed for military action in the cabinet, finally deciding to do so on October 5, with military action to start on the 7th with airstrikes. This was followed by the Taliban rallying to Omar and bin Laden.

=== Planning the invasion ===
The first plan for the war was made by Director of the Central Intelligence Agency, George Tenet two days after 9/11, which involved CIA paramilitary forces and US Army special forces fighting together with the Northern Alliance and with the support of air strikes against the Taliban and Al-Qaeda. Bush wanted to have ground troops, believing that a mostly air campaign signaled weakness. General Tommy Franks, then-commanding general of Central Command (CENTCOM), proposed to President Bush and Secretary of Defense Donald Rumsfeld that the US invade Afghanistan using a conventional force of 60,000 troops, preceded by six months of preparation.

Rumsfeld and Bush feared that a conventional invasion of Afghanistan could bog down as had happened to the Soviets from 1979 and the British in 1842. Rumsfeld rejected Franks's plan, saying "I want men on the ground now!" Franks returned the next day with a plan utilizing US Special Forces. On 26 September 2001, fifteen days after the 9/11 attack, the US covertly inserted members of the CIA's Special Activities Division led by Gary Schroen as part of team Jawbreaker into Afghanistan, forming the Northern Afghanistan Liaison Team. They linked up with the Northern Alliance in the Panjshir Valley north of Kabul.

== 2001: invasion of Afghanistan ==
=== Beginning of military operations ===
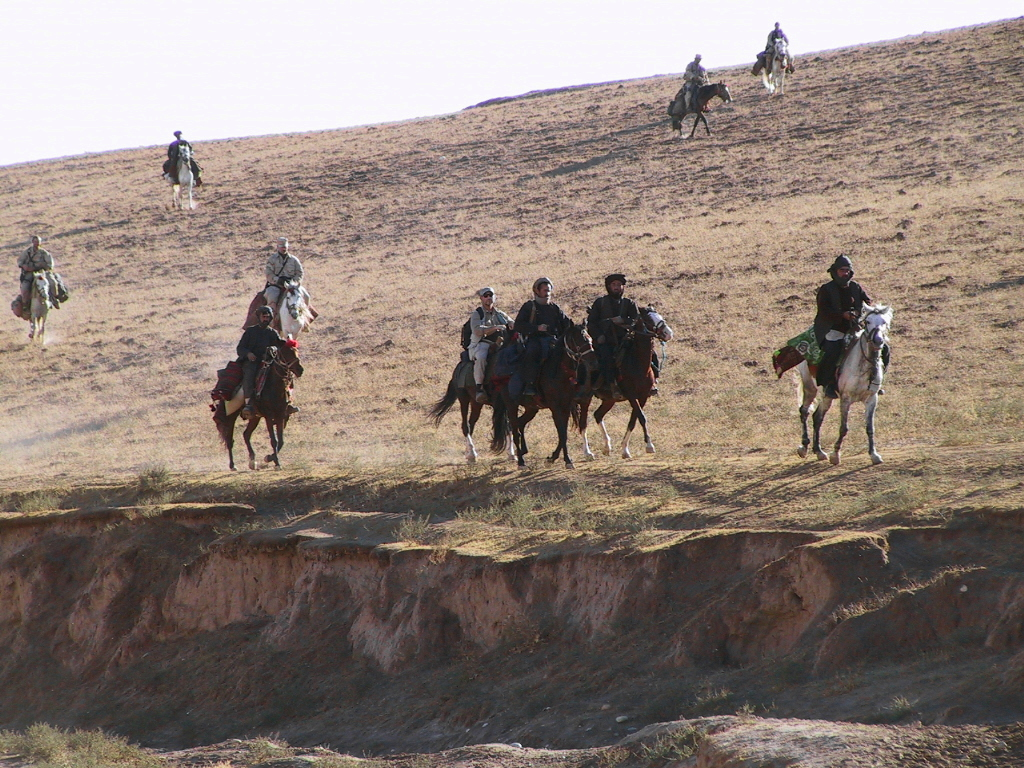
US Army Special Forces and US Air Force Combat Controllers with Northern Alliance troops on horseback

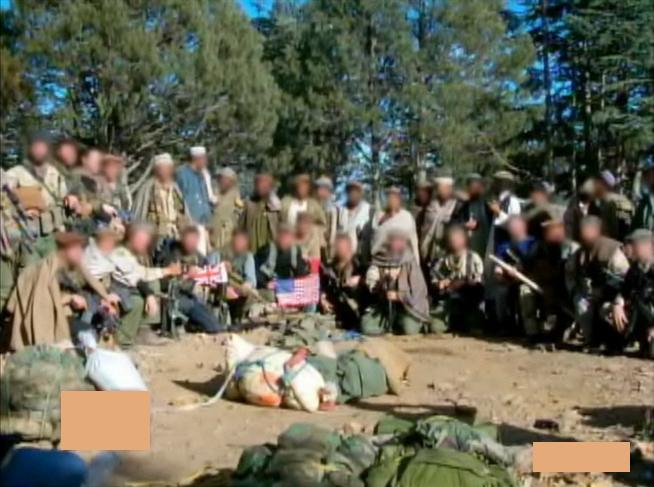
American and British special forces operators at Tora Bora, 2001

The US officially launched Operation Enduring Freedom on 7 October 2001, with the assistance of the United Kingdom. The two were later joined by other countries. The first operations were airstrikes against airfields, radars, Mullah Omar's home, as well as anti-aircraft and communications systems, lasting for two weeks.

The first CIA team had arrived on 26 September. In October, 12-man Special Forces teams began arriving in Afghanistan to work with the CIA and Northern Alliance. The Alliance forces numbered approximately 15–20,000 fighters, while the Taliban had about 45,000, as well as around 2,700 foreign fighters. 10,000 further volunteers may have entered from Pakistan in the first weeks of the war. Instead of attacking Kabul, the main push was made on Mazar-i-Sharif to prevent Tajiks from gaining power and fraying the Alliance. This would also allow a supply line to be opened to the Central Asian republics. The north had about 10,000 Taliban fighters, supported by the 'brigade' of several hundred foreign troops sent by Omar, as well as hundreds of Pakistani ISI operatives. They were faced by 7,000 Northern Alliances fighters divided into the Tajiks of Atta Muhammad Nur, the Hazaras of Muhammad Mohaqiq, and the Uzbeks of Abdul Rashid Dostum.

=== Taliban defeat ===
Ground fighting began on October 21. Air and ground attacks broke Taliban resistance, and after Omar gave the order to retreat from Mazar-i-Sharif, the front collapsed across 12 provinces of the north, only holding in Kunduz with its large Pashtuns population. Omar ordered for the force to organise a defence of Kabul and the south. However, panic spread among the ranks and the leadership. On November 12, they left the capital to continue resistance from Jalalabad and Kandahar. Mohammed Fahim occupied the city and Burhanuddin Rabbani declared himself the new president but was not recognised by the international or Afghan communities.

After the fall of Kabul, troops began laying down arms everywhere, with Omar giving permission for commanders in provincial capitals outside of Kandahar to surrender. Most al-Qaeda and Taliban were not captured, escaping to neighboring Pakistan or retreating to rural or remote mountainous regions. In Kunduz, about 5,000 Taliban and their Pakistani supporters remained, with the Kunduz airlift allegedly allowing up to 2,000 of both to escape, while the rest surrendered in exchange for free passage. However, the Dasht-i-Leili massacre killed 250 to 2,000 Taliban prisoners shot and/or suffocated to death in metal shipping containers while being transferred by Junbish-i Milli soldiers.

After the Taliban had retreated to its southern highlands by mid-November, there was little interest in the Northern Alliance to continue advancing. To complete the overthrow, the US needed Pashtun allies. For this purpose, the CIA had cultivated Abdul Haq and Hamid Karzai. Haq had, however, been killed after attempting an anti-Taliban insurrection. Karzai almost met the same fate, barely escaping to Pakistan. He returned with US support and was able to organise a tribal army. This kept growing as he racked up victories. The US also started backing another Pashtun leader advancing towards Kandahar, Gul Agha Sherzai. The city was defended by 3,000 Taliban under the experienced command of Hafiz Abdur Rahim.

Omar decided to defend Kandahar until the Afghan Arabs there had escaped and the Taliban who had surrendered in the north had returned home, despite pleas for surrender from other leaders. On 5 December, Karzai met with top Taliban leaders close to him, and may have given him a letter signed by Omar offering peace. On 6 December, a second meeting agreed for the Taliban to leave the city. This was confirmed by their ambassador to Pakistan. However, the deal fell through when US special forces entered the city before it was finalized and the US pressured Karzai to not negotiate. Donald Rumsfeld publicly denounced any peace with the Taliban. Taliban sources, on the other hand, say that Omar was not part of the deal and was not going to surrender Kandahar. In any case, Omar disappeared, leaving either for another part of Afghanistan or Pakistan. Most leaders and thousands of fighters also escaped to the latter. Karzai subsequently declared a general amnesty to them.

==== Bin Laden's escape and killing ====
After seeking bin Laden since 9/11, the CIA got a clue of him traveling through Jalalabad with hundreds of fighters towards the Spīn Ghar mountains around 10 November. By late November, he was at a fortified training camp at the Tora Bora. He had chosen this on the basis of its good defensive position, believing he could defeat the Americans the way he did the Soviets previously, despite opposition from those around him. CIA teams working with tribal militias followed him there and began to call in air strikes, with special forces soon arriving in support. While the tribal force numbered 1,000, it was not fighting eagerly during Ramadan, with some fighters also having sympathies towards the enemy. While the CIA requested that United States Army Rangers be sent and Marines were ready to deploy, they were declined under the belief that the tribal fighters would be faster. Bin Laden was however able to escape at some point of December to Pakistan. Osama bin Laden was eventually killed by US Navy SEALs in Abbottabad, Pakistan in 2011.

=== Political settlement ===
The Bonn Conference started on 27 November 2001 with the US, Pakistan, India, Russia, Iran, the Northern Alliance, theformer Afghan monarchy, and smaller Pashtun groups participating, while the Taliban were excluded. In the conference, the Bonn Agreement was agreed to, establishing a process for setting up a new government. An interim administration would be set up for six months, followed by a loya jirga to decide on a transitional government for 18 months to draft a constitution and hold elections for a permanent government. Rabbani did not at first want to give up the presidency, but relented under international pressure and Karzai was chosen as the new leader.

On 20 December 2001, the United Nations authorized an International Security Assistance Force (ISAF), with a mandate to help the Afghans maintain security in Kabul and surrounding areas. It was initially established from the headquarters of the British 3rd Mechanised Division under Major General John McColl, and for its first years numbered no more than 5,000. Its mandate did not extend beyond the Kabul area for the first few years.

== 2002: Continuing occupation ==
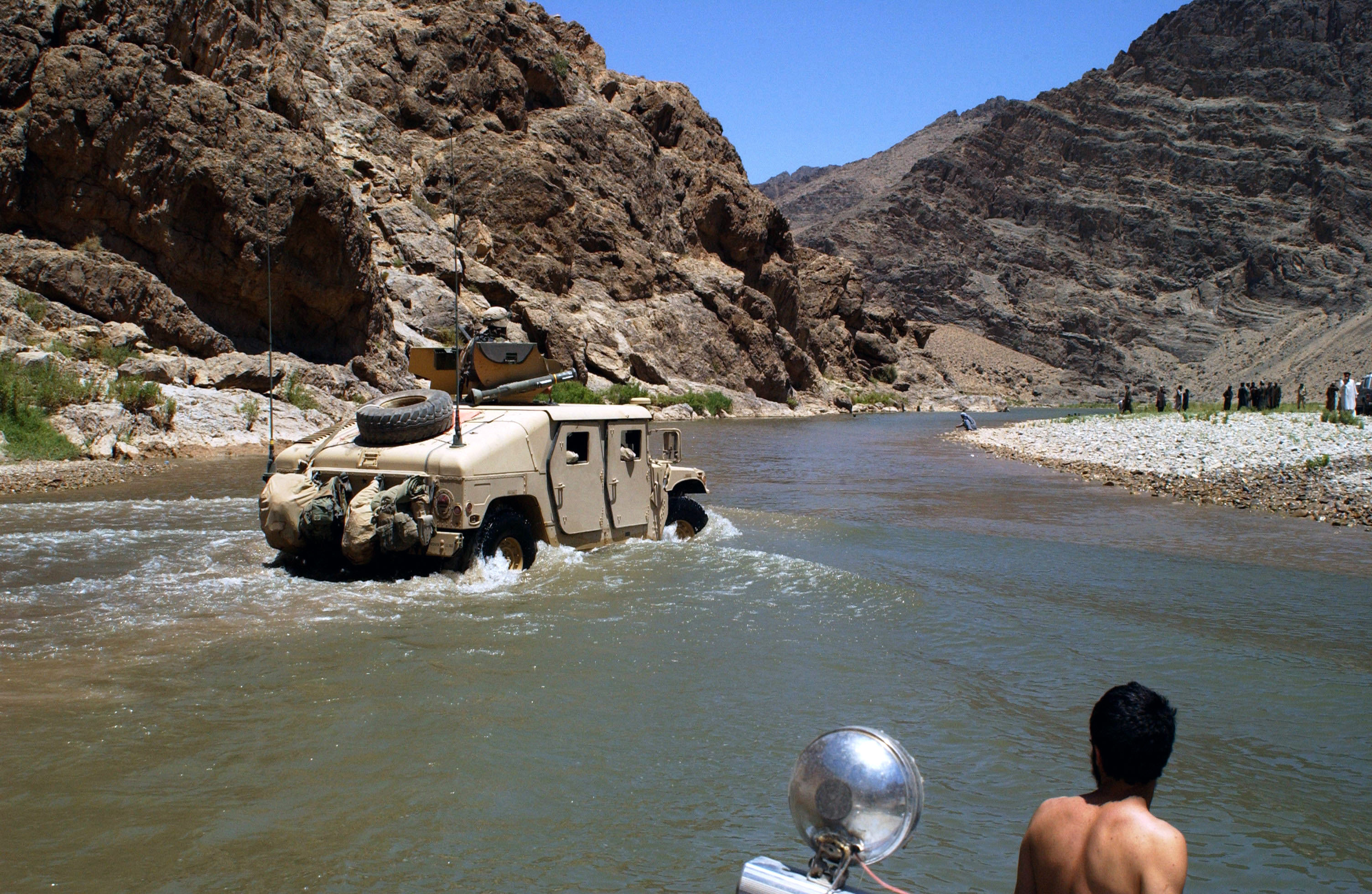
US Humvee crossing an Afghan river in 2002.

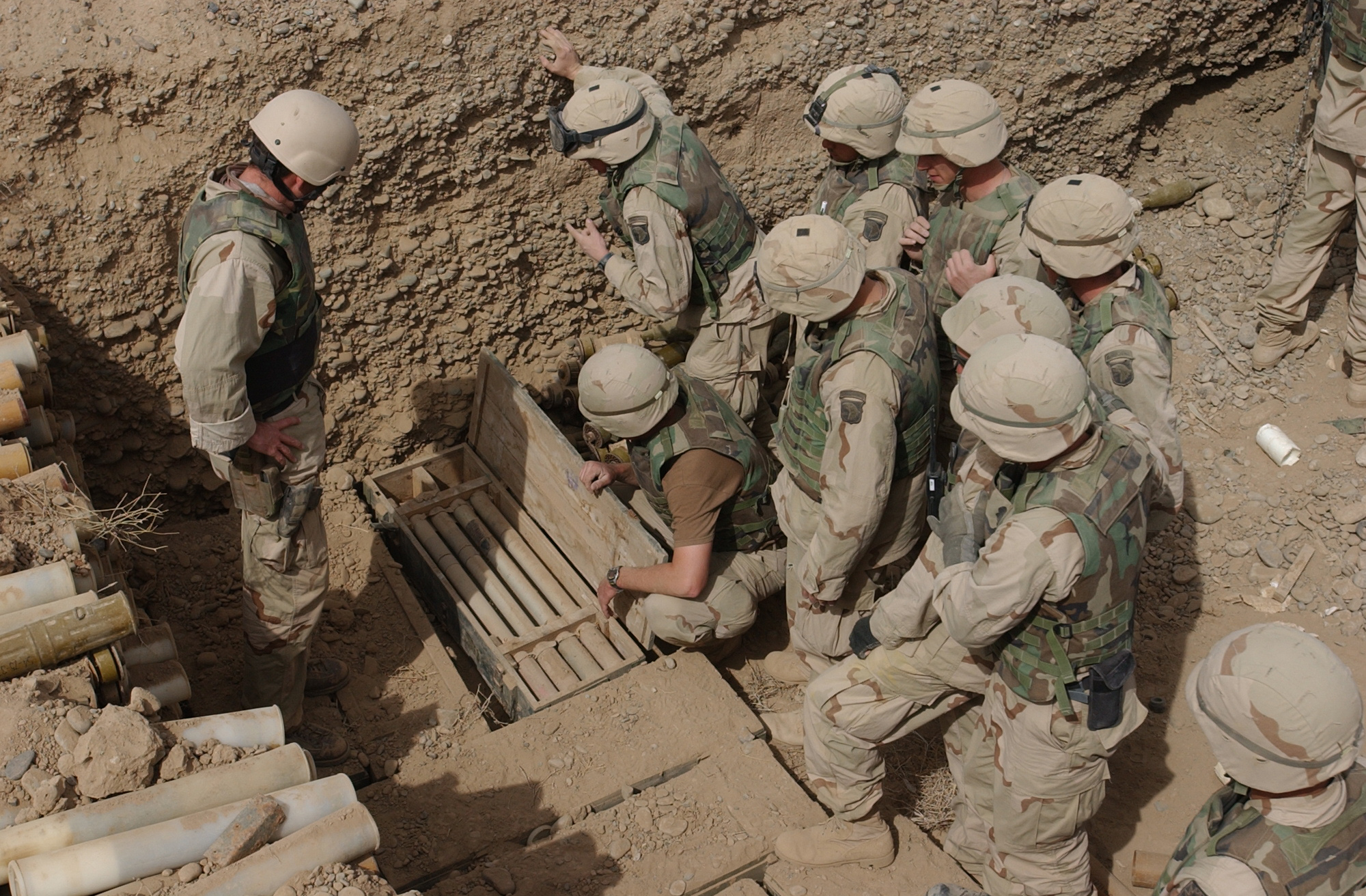
US Army and Navy EOD technicians prepare to destroy captured Chinese Type 65 recoilless rifles near Kandahar International Airport, 20 February 2002

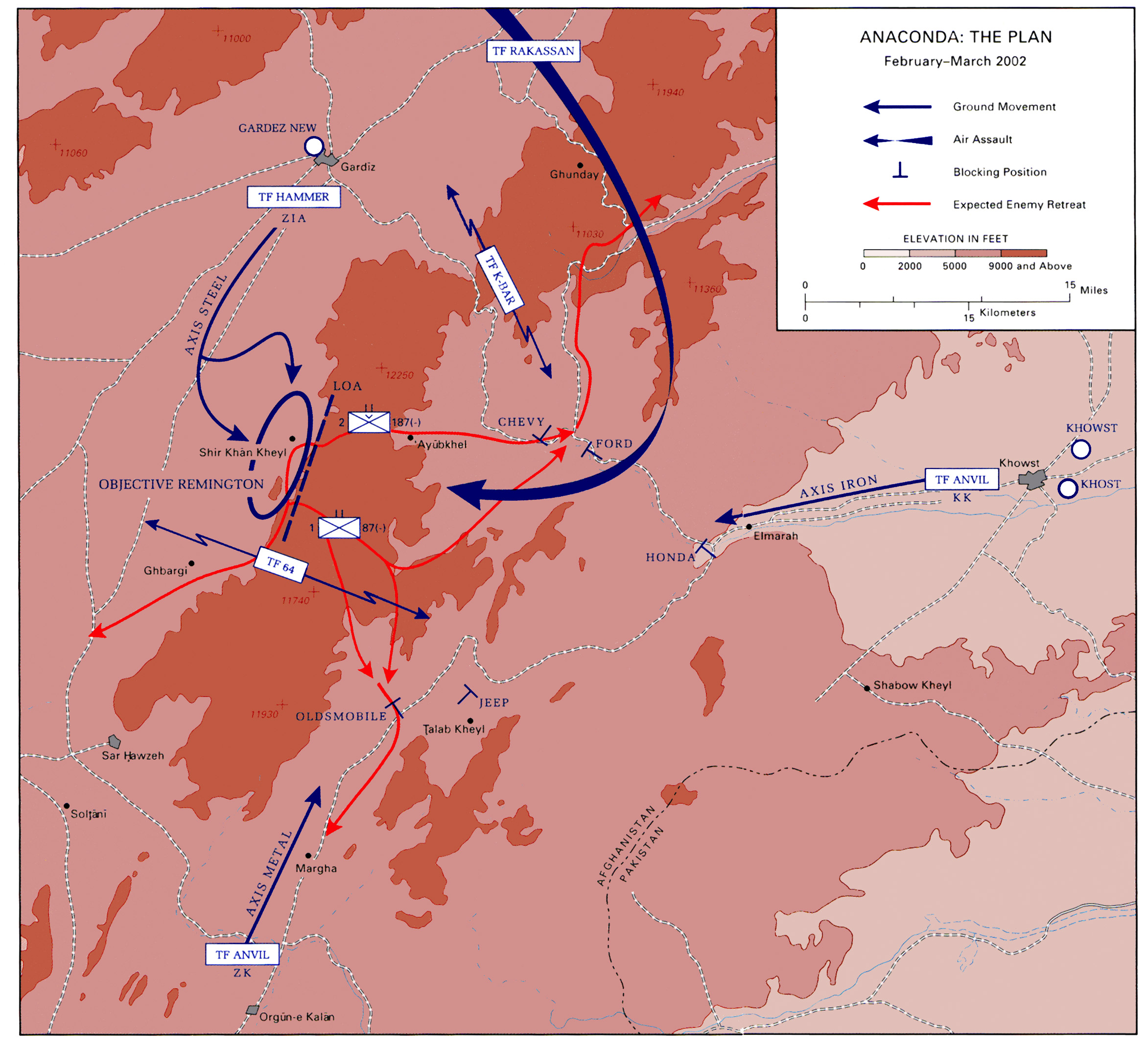
An operational map of Operation Anaconda.

In Operation Anaconda, US Army battalions and special forces attacked Taliban and Al-Qaeda fighters in the Shah-i-Kot Valley, suffering 80 casualties before victory. This was the last major battle for the next for years. In early 2002, the US had 8,000 troops in the country, supported by 5,000 allied ones. With Omar and bin Laden and their key supporters having escaped, it was expected that the forces would have to remain until the remnants of Taliban and Al-Qaeda had been defeated and democracy established in the country to prevent terrorists from returning. While the goal was to prevent the vacuum created in the 1990s, no large-scale military presence or investments were planned in the then-peaceful country. Beyond this, there was not much of a plan for the future and no deadline was set for the occupation.

A new Afghan military force was also set up. The militia forces encompassing 100,000 fighters were renamed the AMF and given 40 division numbers, though they continued to answer to warlords and tribal leaders. However, Rumsfeld opposed spending money building a formal army, preferring the warlords to stay in power. Finally, in December 2002 the US relented with a cap of 50,000 troops set by Rumsfeld, while Khalilzad demanded 120,000, in the end US General Karl Eikenberry and Afghan technocrat Ashraf Ghani agreeing to 70,000. However, the new force received only 10 weeks of training, compared to the 6 to 12 months requested by trainers. After the first year, training was given over to unexperienced National Guard units as the regular American forces were taking part in the Iraq War. The issue of a lack of national identity shared by the new army was also noted by Eikenberry.

=== Post-Anaconda operations ===
Following the battle at Shahi-Kot, al-Qaeda fighters established sanctuaries on the Pakistani border, where they launched cross-border raids beginning in the summer of 2002. Guerrilla units, numbering between 5 and 25 men, regularly crossed the border to fire rockets at coalition bases, ambush convoys and patrols and assault non-governmental organizations. The area around the Shkin base in Paktika province saw some of the heaviest activity.

Taliban fighters remained in hiding in the rural regions of four southern provinces: Kandahar, Zabul, Helmand and Uruzgan. After Anaconda the Department of Defense requested British Royal Marines, highly trained in mountain warfare, to be deployed. In response, 45 Commando deployed under the operational codename Operation Jacana in April 2002. They conducted missions (including Operation Snipe, Operation Condor, and Operation Buzzard) over several weeks with varying results. The Taliban avoided combat.

In May 2002 Combined Joint Task Force 180 became the senior US military headquarters in the country, under Lieutenant General Dan K. McNeill. Later in 2002, CJSOFT became a single integrated command under the broader CJTF-180, which commanded all US forces assigned to OEF-A; it was built around an Army Special Forces Group (often manned by National Guard units) and SEAL teams. A small JSOC element (formerly Task Force Sword/11), not under direct CTJF command, embedded within CJSOFT and was manned by a joint SEAL and Ranger element that rotated command. It was not under direct ISAF command, although it operated in support of NATO operations.

=== New Afghan regime ===
Nation-building had been forbidden by Rumsfeld and was not advocated by Bush. Nevertheless, the status of women played an important policy role, with a bipartisan bill being passed by Congress to fund efforts to improve it. This was also reflected in international development projects, which included the United Nations Assistance Mission in Afghanistan and funding by the United States Agency for International Development. Developing institutions was also a part of the effort, especially being pushed by European allies. This eventually nudged the US towards nation-building efforts.

Karzai had become the new president, with former Northern Alliance leaders such as Mohammed Fahim, Abdul Rashid Dostum, and Ismail Khan as ministers. However, there were no other formal institutions. The US representative Zalmay Khalilzad also played a major role. The 2002 loya jirga was set up in June with 1,500 participants from across the country. The Taliban were not invited. The loya jirga argued over whether the former king Mohammed Zahir Shah should play a role in the government, but eventually the US supported Karzai and the king backed down. Another conflict was between the Tajiks and Pashtuns. The assembly also decided that sharia would play a role in the new judicial system.

== 2003–2005: New Afghan state and Taliban resurgence ==
The 2003 loya jirga was composed to draft a new constitution. The main argument was over whether the country should have a centralised system or a more regional one, with the former, supported by Karzai and the US, winning. The 2004 Constitution of Afghanistan resembled the old monarchy, with the president having wide powers and all taxation and spending power given to the central government. In the popular elections of 2004, Karzai was elected president of the country, now named the Islamic Republic of Afghanistan. This was followed by the 2005 Afghan parliamentary election, which empowered various local power brokers, such as Abdul Rasul Sayyaf, Mohammad Arif Noorzai, and Yunus Qanuni. The new government had support among different ethnic groups, international recognition, as well as being within Afghan traditions.

=== 2003: Continuing war ===
We clearly have moved from major combat activity to a period of stability and stabilization and reconstruction activities. . . . The bulk of the country today is permissive; it’s secure.” – US Secretary of Defence Donald Rumsfeld in early 2003.

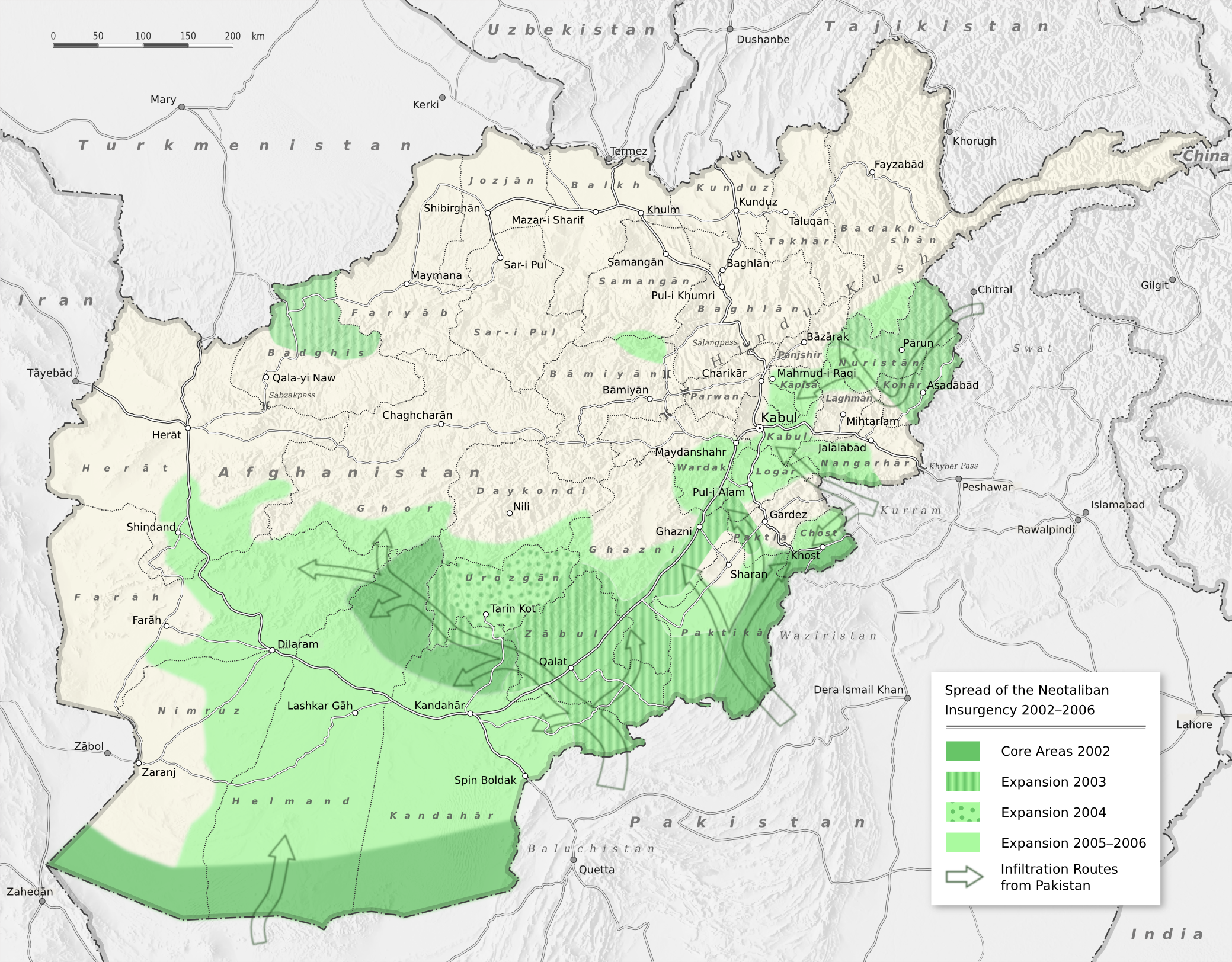
Map detailing the spread of the Taliban-insurgency in Afghanistan 2002–2006

Despite warnings by Karzai and Khalilzad that insurgent sanctuaries were forming in Pakistan, the Bush administration ignored them. Meanwhile, Taliban leader Mullah Omar reorganized the movement, and in 2003 launched an insurgency against the government and ISAF.

Pamphlets by Taliban and other groups turned up strewn in towns and the countryside in early 2003, urging Islamic faithful to rise up against US forces and other foreign soldiers in holy war. On 27 January 2003, during Operation Mongoose, a band of fighters were assaulted by US forces at the Adi Ghar cave complex 25 km (15 mi) north of Spin Boldak. Eighteen rebels were reported killed with no US casualties. The site was suspected to be a base for supplies and fighters coming from Pakistan. The first isolated attacks by relatively large Taliban bands on Afghan targets also appeared around that time.

Operation Valiant Strike was a major United States military ground operation in Afghanistan announced on 19 March 2003 that involved 2nd and 3rd battalions of 504th Parachute Infantry Regiment, Romanian and Afghan troops. The combined forces moved through Kandahar and parts of Southern Afghanistan with the objective of eliminating Taliban enemy forces and weapons caches while also attempting to gather intelligence on Taliban activity in the area. At the conclusion of the operation on 24 March 2003, coalition forces had detained 13 suspected Taliban fighters and confiscated more than 170 rocket-propelled grenades, 180 land mines, 20 automatic rifles and machine guns, as well as many rockets, rifles, and launchers.

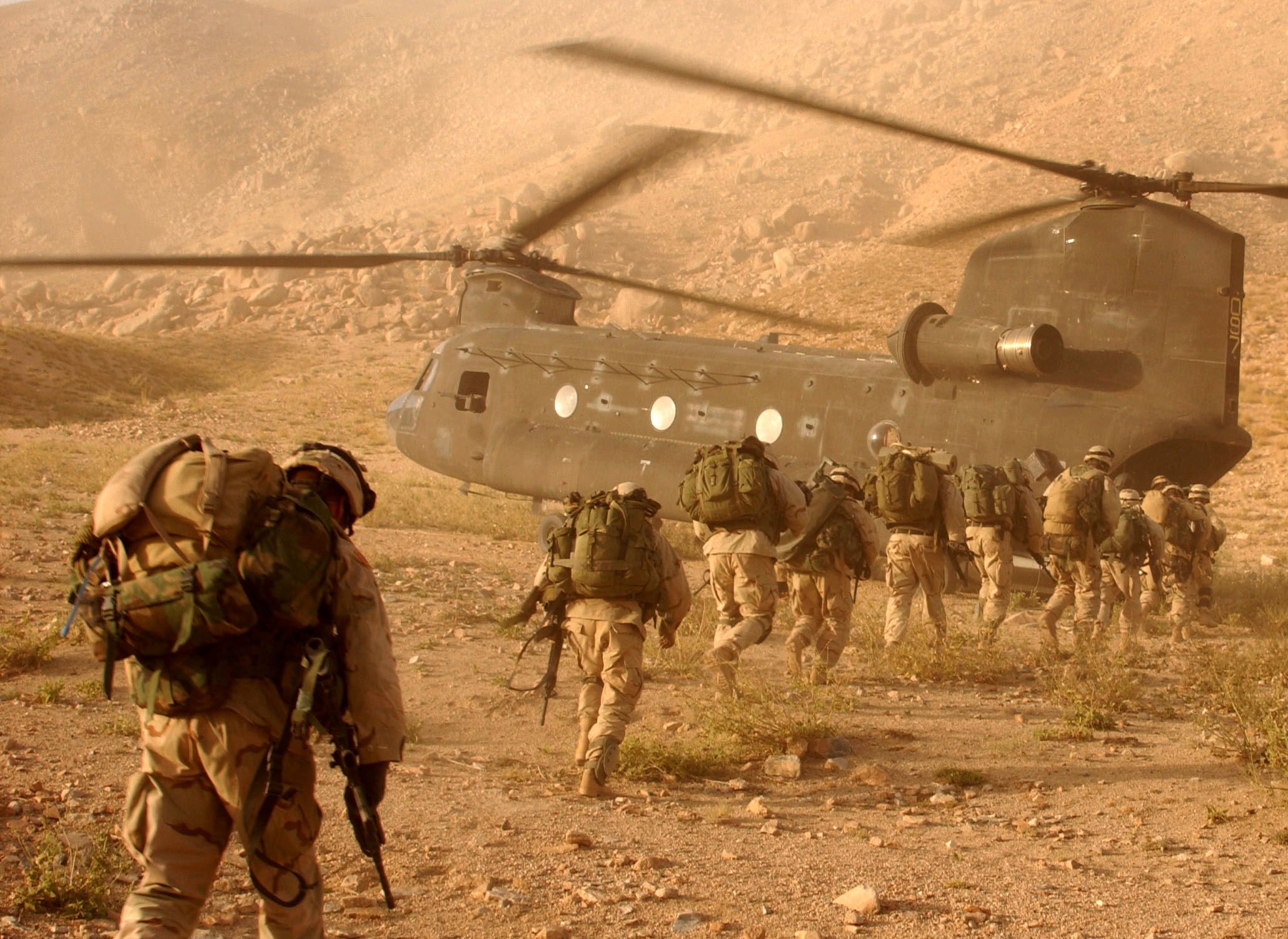
US troops board a helicopter

In May 2003, the Taliban Supreme Court's chief justice, Abdul Salam, proclaimed that the Taliban were back, regrouped, rearmed, and ready for guerrilla war to expel US forces from Afghanistan. Omar assigned five operational zones to Taliban commanders such as Dadullah, who took charge in Zabul province.

Small mobile training camps were established along the border to train recruits in guerrilla warfare, according to senior Taliban warrior Mullah Malang in June 2003. Most were drawn from tribal area madrassas in Pakistan. Bases, a few with as many as 200 fighters, emerged in the tribal areas by the summer of 2003. Pakistani will to prevent infiltration was uncertain, while Pakistani military operations proved of little use.

As the summer of 2003 continued, Taliban attacks gradually increased in frequency. Dozens of Afghan government soldiers, NGO humanitarian workers, and several US soldiers died in the raids, ambushes and rocket attacks. Besides guerrilla attacks, Taliban fighters began building up forces in the district of Dai Chopan in Zabul Province. The Taliban decided to make a stand there. Over the course of the summer, up to 1,000 guerrillas moved there. Over 220 people, including several dozen Afghan police, were killed in August 2003.

On 11 August 2003, NATO assumed control of ISAF. Some US forces in Afghanistan operated under NATO command, while the rest remained under direct US command.

=== 2004–2005 ===
United States led-coalition forces carried out Operation Asbury Park on June 2, 2004, and June 17, 2004, of taskforce 1/6 BLT of the 22nd Marine Expeditionary Unit engaged in fighting with Taliban and other anti-coalition forces in both Oruzgan Province and Zabul Province culminating in the Dai Chopan region of Afghanistan. This operation was characterized by atypical fighting on the side of the tactics of the Taliban and the other guerillas encountered. culminating in a large battle on June 8. During Asbury Park, the 22nd Marine Expeditionary Unit was faced with an opponent that frequently would dig in and engage the Marine forces, rather than the traditional hit and run (or "asymmetric attack") methods. As such, Marines, with the aid of B-1B Lancer, A-10 Warthog, and AH-64 Apache aircraft, engaged in "pitched battles each day", culminating in a large battle on June 8. The last of the fighting which took place near Dai Chopan on June 8 was decisive in that enemy forces were depleted to such an extent that no further contact was made with the enemy for the duration of the operation. What was meant by the enemy to be a three pronged attack June 8, 2004 resulted in over 85 confirmed kills, with estimates well in excess of 100 enemy dead, an estimated 200–300 wounded, with dozens captured. While throughout the entire operation a "handful" of US forces and Afghan Militia were injured.

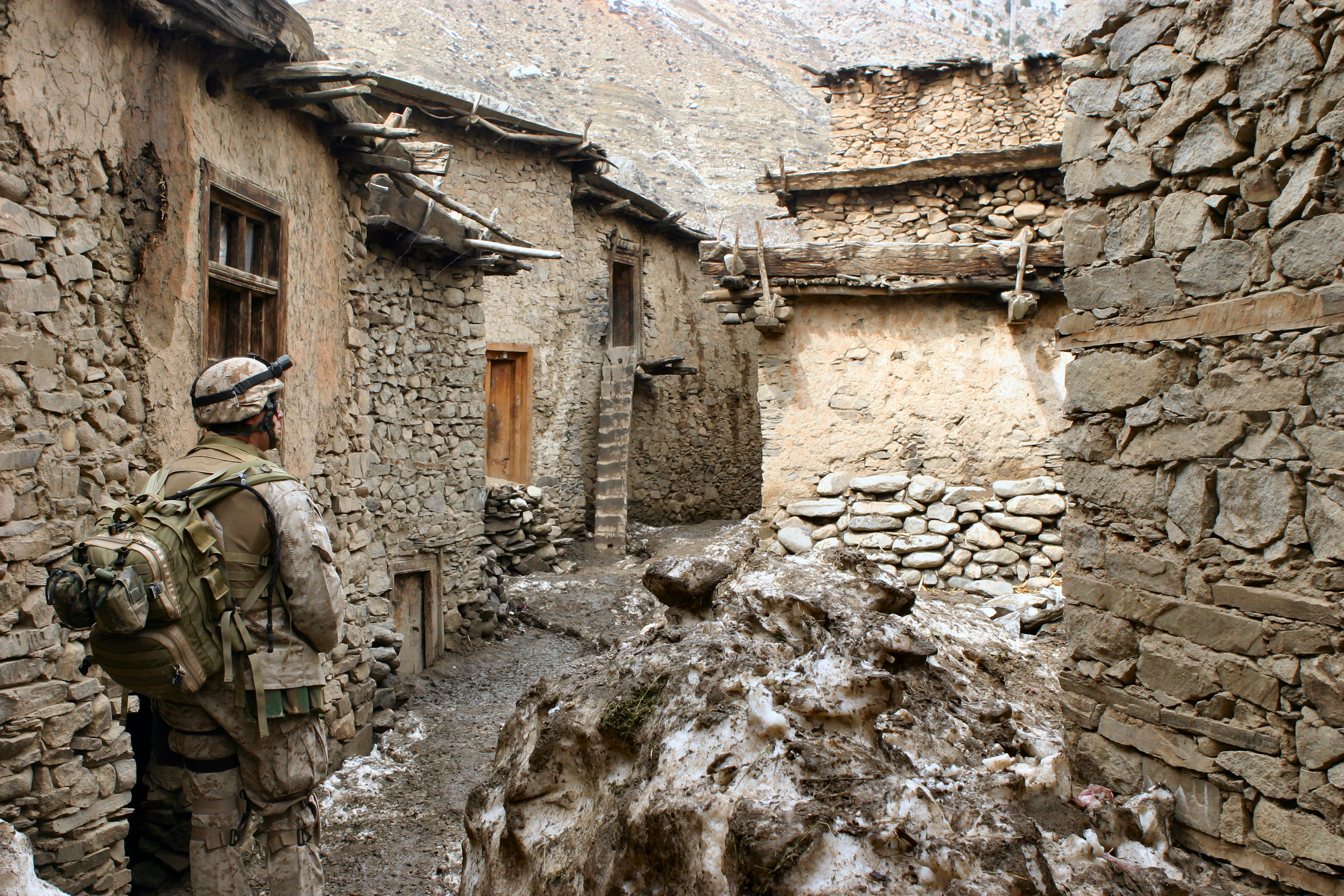
A US Navy Corpsman searches for Taliban fighters in the spring of 2005.

In June 2004, United States Forces began Drone strikes in Pakistan along the Federal Tribal Areas against Taliban and Al-Qaeda militants. These strikes began during the administration of United States President George W. Bush.

In late 2004, the then hidden Taliban leader Mohammed Omar announced an insurgency against "America and its puppets" (referring to transitional Afghan government forces) to "regain the sovereignty of our country."

In late June through mid-July 2005, United States Navy Seals carried out Operation Red Wings as a joint military operation in the Pech District of Afghanistan's Kunar Province, on the slopes of a mountain named Sawtalo Sar, approximately 20 miles (32 km) west of Kunar's provincial capital of Asadabad, . Operation Red Wings was intended to disrupt local Taliban anti-coalition militia (ACM) activity, thus contributing to regional stability and thereby facilitating the Afghan Parliament elections scheduled for September 2005. At the time, Taliban anti-coalition militia activity in the region was carried out most notably by a small group, led by a local man from Nangarhar Province, Ahmad Shah, who had aspirations of regional Islamic fundamentalist prominence. He and his small group were among the primary targets of the operation.

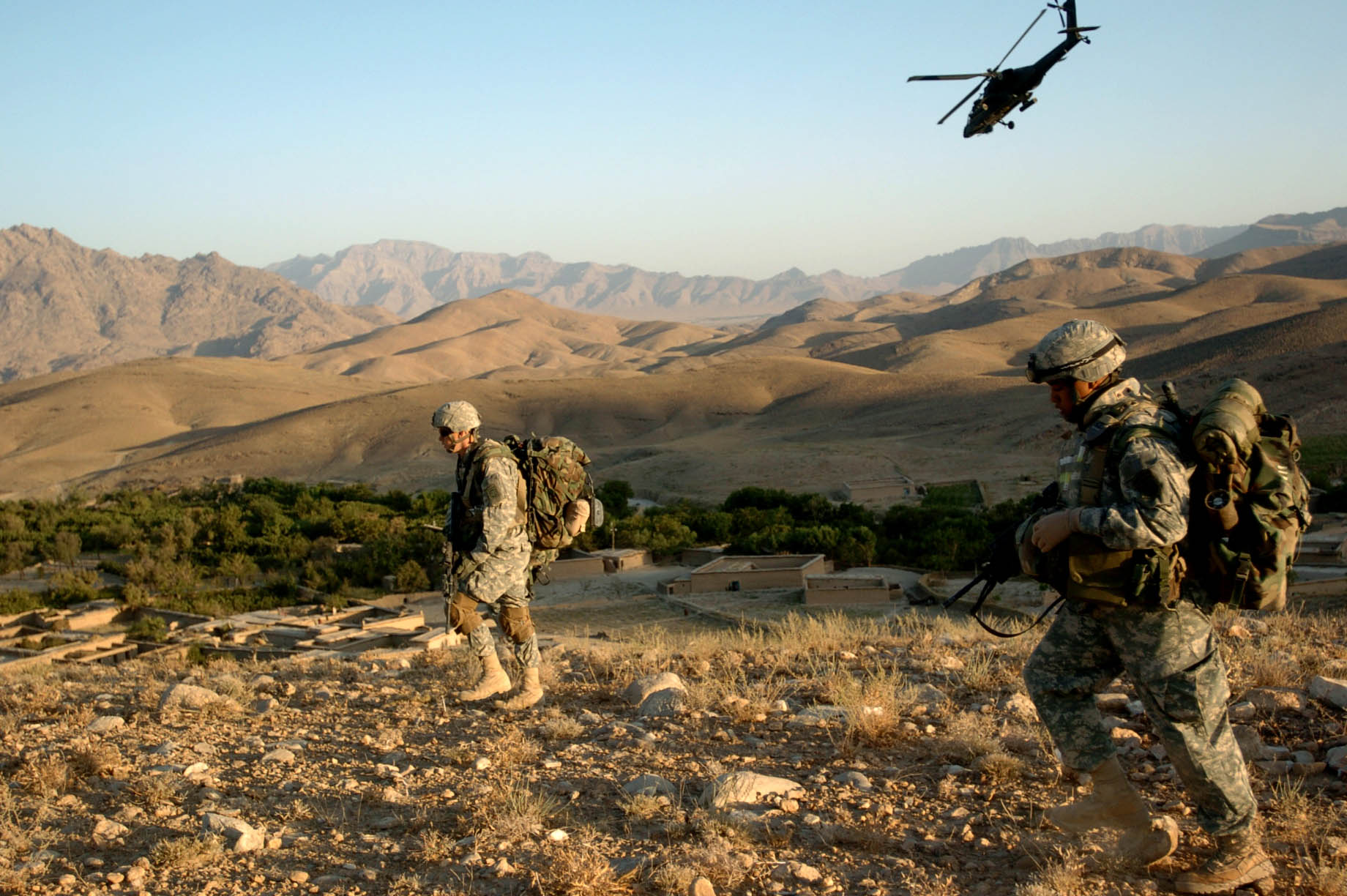
An Apache helicopter provides protection from the air, October 2005

Between 13 August and 18 August 2005, the United States Marine Corps carried out a military operation, called Operation Whalers, that took place in the Kunar Province just weeks after the disastrous Operation Red Wings. Like Operation Red Wings, the objective of Operation Whalers was the disruption of Taliban Anti-Coalition Militia (ACM) activity in the region in support of further stabilizing the region for unencumbered voter turnout for the 2005 Afghan parliamentary election. Operation Whalers was planned and executed by the 2nd Battalion of the 3rd Marine Regiment (2/3). The emphasis of the operation was an Anti-Coalition Militia cell led by Ahmad Shah, which was one of 22 identified ACM groups operating in the region at that time, and was the most active. Ahmad Shah's cell was responsible for the Navy SEAL ambush and subsequent MH-47 shootdown that killed, in total, 19 US special operations personnel during Operation Red Wings. Operation Whalers, named after the Hartford Whalers professional hockey team, was the "sequel" to Operation Red Wings in that it was aimed at furthering stabilization of the security situation in the restive Kunar Province of Eastern Afghanistan, a long-term goal of American and coalition forces operating in the area at that time. Operation Whalers, conducted by a number of Marine infantry companies of 2/3 with attached Afghan National Army soldiers and supported by conventional Army aviation, intelligence, and combat arms forces units and US Air Force aviation assets, proved a success. Taliban Anti-Coalition Militia activity dropped substantially and subsequent human intelligence and signals intelligence revealed that Ahmad Shah had been seriously wounded. Shah, who sought to disrupt the parliamentary election, was not able to undertake any significant Taliban Anti-Coalition operations subsequent to Operation Whalers in Kunar or neighboring provinces.

In late August 2005, Afghan government forces attacked, backed by US troops with air support. After a one-week battle, Taliban forces were routed with up to 124 fighters killed.

== 2006: War between NATO forces and Taliban ==
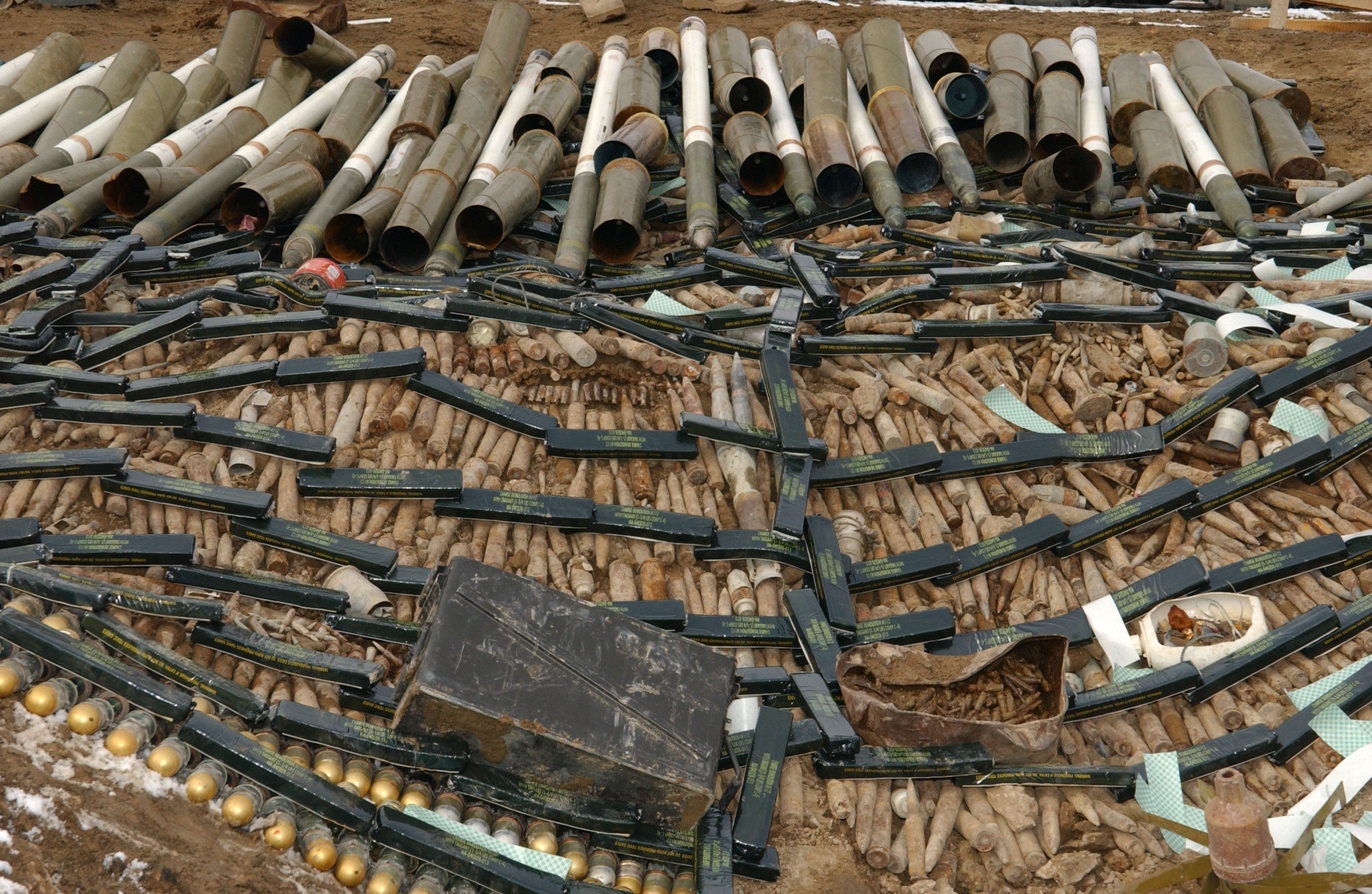
A number of 1.25lb M112 demolition charges, consisting of a C-4 compound, sit atop degraded weaponry scheduled for destruction.

From January 2006, a multinational ISAF contingent started to replace US troops in southern Afghanistan. The British 16 Air Assault Brigade (later reinforced by Royal Marines) formed the core of the force, along with troops and helicopters from Australia, Canada and the Netherlands. The initial force consisted of roughly 3,300 British, 2,300 Canadian, 1,963 Dutch, 300 Australian, 290 Danish and 150 Estonian troops. Air support was provided by US, British, Dutch, Norwegian and French combat aircraft and helicopters.

In January 2006, NATO's focus in southern Afghanistan was to form Provincial Reconstruction Teams with the British leading in Helmand, while the Netherlands and Canada would lead similar deployments in Orūzgān and Kandahar, respectively. Local Taliban figures pledged to resist.

On 1 March 2006, US President George W. Bush along with his wife Laura made a visit to Afghanistan where they greeted US soldiers, met with Afghan officials and later appeared at a special inauguration ceremony at the US Embassy.

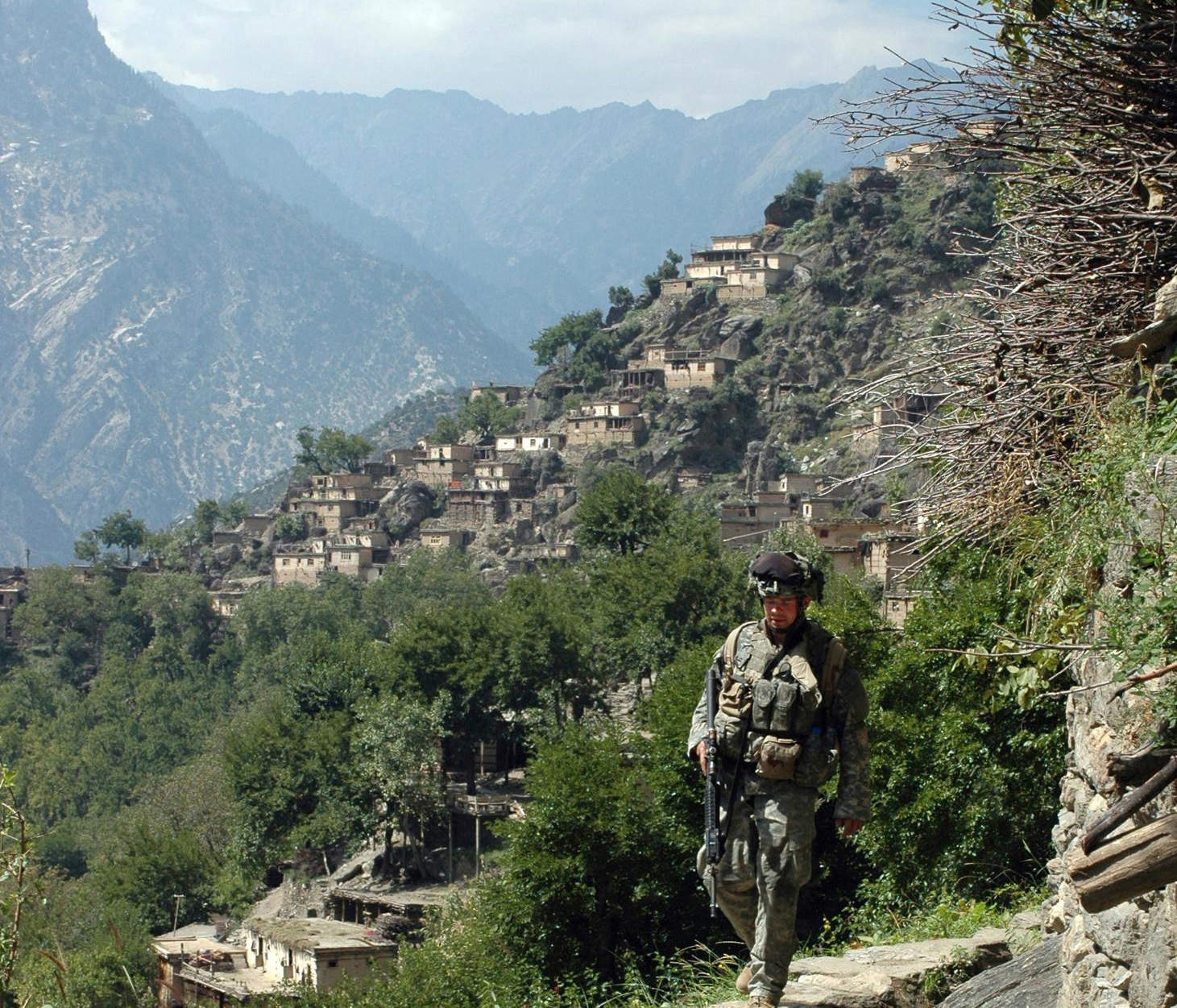
A US Army soldier from 10th Mountain Division, patrols Aranas, Afghanistan

NATO operations in Southern Afghanistan in 2006 were led by British, Canadian and Dutch commanders. Operation Mountain Thrust was launched on 17 May 2006.

On 29 May 2006, while – according to American website The Spokesman-Review – Afghanistan faced "a mounting threat from armed Taliban fighters in the countryside", a US military truck that was part of a convoy in Kabul lost control and plowed into twelve civilian vehicles, killing one and injuring six people. The surrounding crowd got angry and a riot arose, lasting all day and resulting in 20 dead and 160 injured. When stone-throwing and gunfire had come from a crowd of some 400 men, the US troops had used their weapons "to defend themselves" while leaving the scene, a US military spokesman said. A correspondent for the Financial Times in Kabul suggested that this was the outbreak of "a ground swell of resentment" and "growing hostility to foreigners" that had been growing and building since 2004, and may also have been triggered by a US air strike a week earlier in southern Afghanistan killing 30 civilians, where she assumed that "the Taliban had been sheltering in civilian houses".

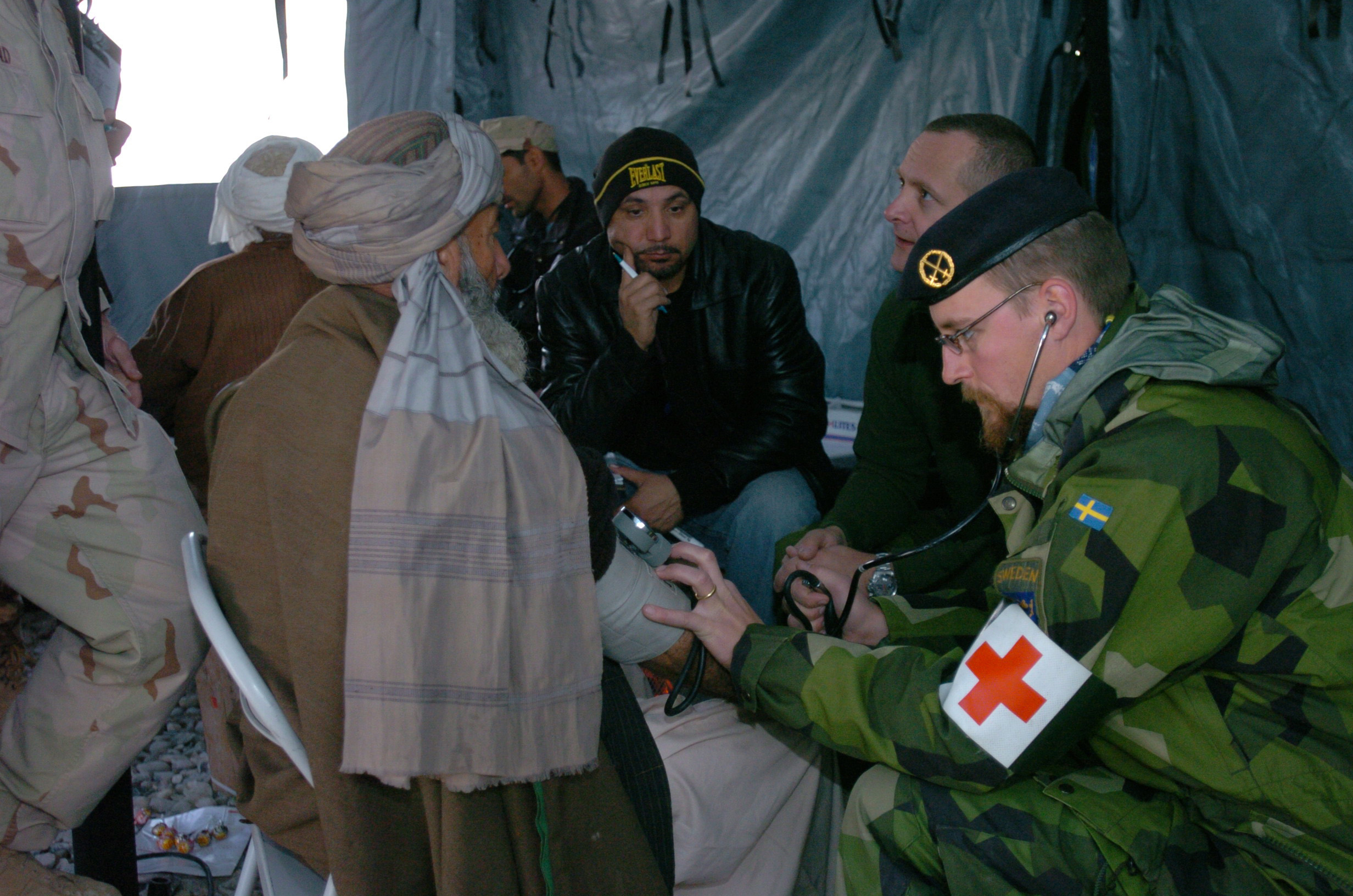
Swedish Army medic in the Mazar-e Sharif region

In July, Canadian Forces, supported by US, British, Dutch and Danish forces, launched Operation Medusa.

On 31 July 2006, ISAF assumed command of the South of the country, and by 5 October 2006 it also held the East. Once this transition had taken place, ISAF grew to a large coalition involving up to 46 countries, under a US commander.

A combined force of Dutch and Australians launched a successful offensive between late April to mid July 2006 to push the Taliban out of the Chora and Baluchi areas.

On 18 September 2006 Italian special forces of Task Force 45 and airborne troopers of the "Trieste" infantry regiment of the Rapid Reaction Corps composed of Italian and Spanish forces, took part in the Wyconda Pincer operation in the districts of Bala Buluk and Pusht Rod, in Farah Province. Italian forces killed at least 70 Taliban. The situation in RC-W then deteriorated. Hotspots included Badghis in the far north and Farah in the Southwest.

Further NATO operations included the Battle of Panjwaii, Operation Mountain Fury and Operation Falcon Summit. NATO achieved tactical victories and area denial, but the Taliban were not completely defeated. NATO operations continued into 2007.

== 2007: US build-up, ISAF war against Taliban ==
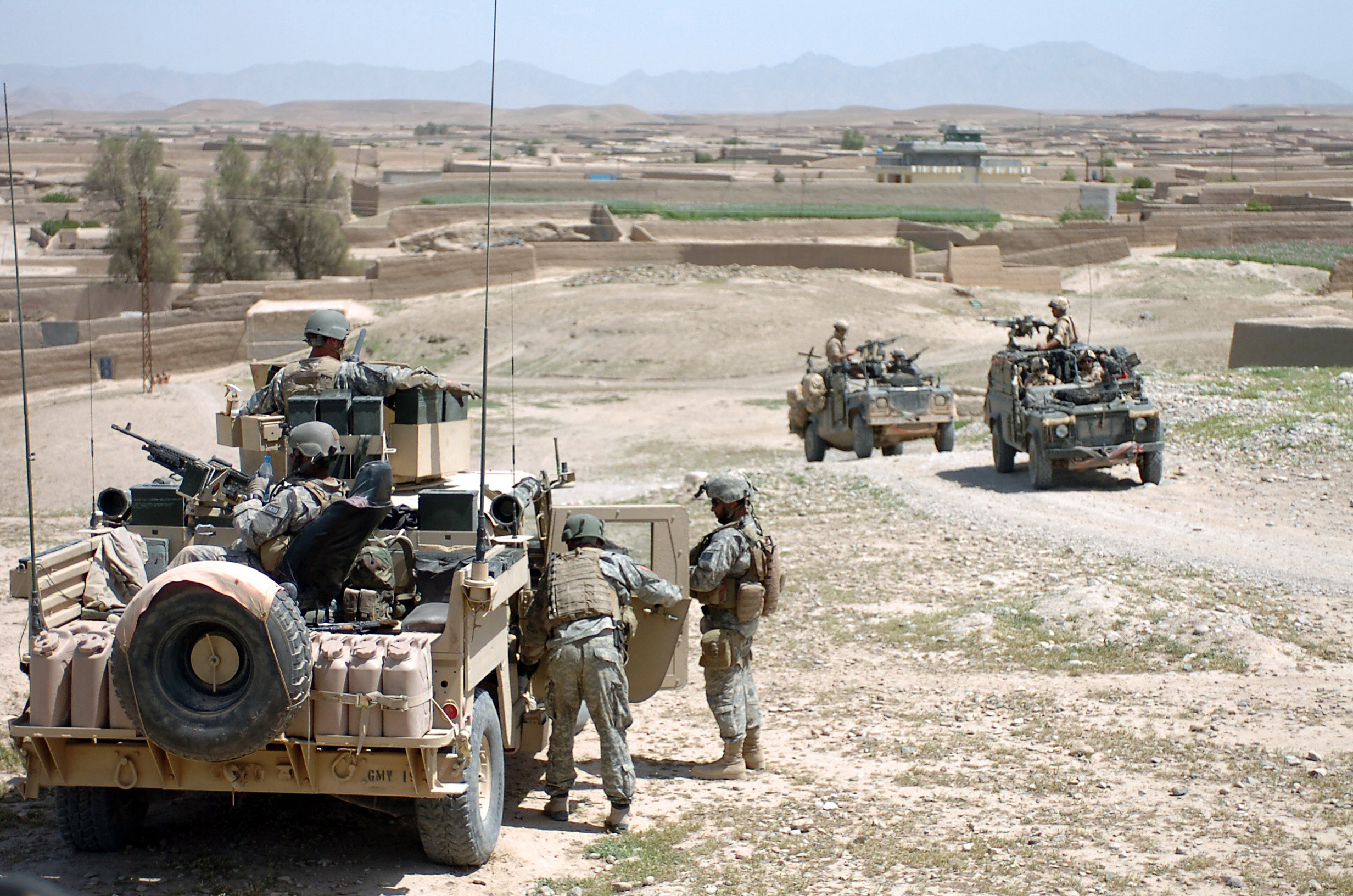
US and British troops during a patrol in Helmand Province

In January and February 2007, British Royal Marines mounted Operation Volcano to clear insurgents from firing-points in the village of Barikju, north of Kajaki. Other major operations during this period included Operation Achilles (March–May) and Operation Lastay Kulang. The UK Ministry of Defence announced its intention to bring British troop levels in the country up to 7,700 (committed until 2009). Further operations, such as Operation Silver and Operation Silicon, took place to keep up the pressure on the Taliban in the hope of blunting their expected spring offensive.

In February 2007, Combined Forces Command-Afghanistan inactivated. Combined Joint Task Force 76, a two-star US command headquartered on Bagram Airfield, assumed responsibility as the National Command Element for US forces in Afghanistan. Combined Security Transition Command-Afghanistan, or CSTC-A, the other two-star US command, was charged with training and mentoring the Afghan National Security Forces.

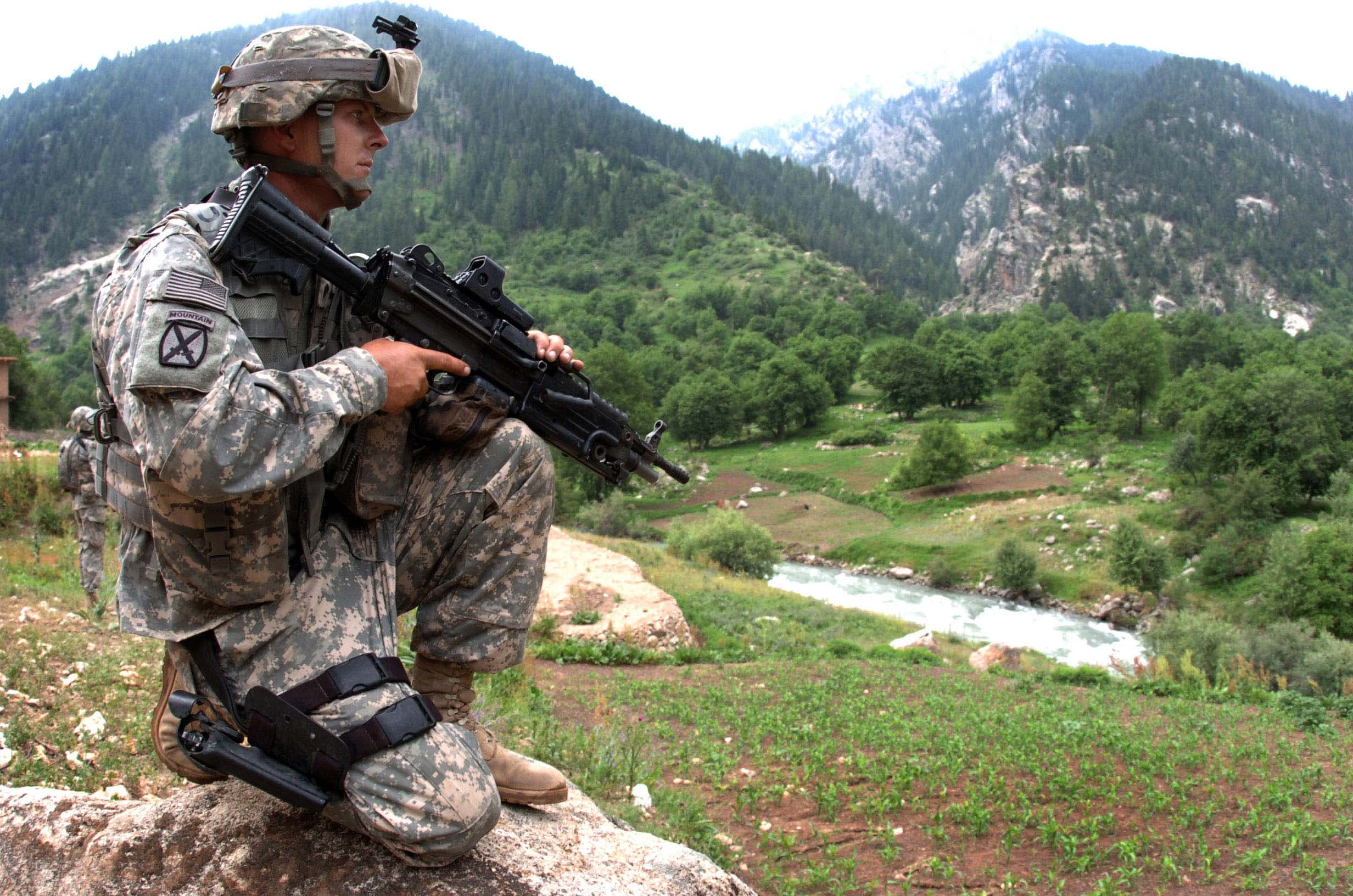
A US soldier conducts a mountain patrol in Nuristan Province.

On 4 March 2007, US Marines killed at least 12 civilians and injured 33 in Shinwar district, Nangrahar, in a response to a bomb ambush. The event became known as the "Shinwar massacre". The 120 member Marine unit responsible for the attack were ordered to leave the country by Army Major General Frank Kearney, because the incident damaged the unit's relations with the local Afghan population.

Later in March 2007, the US during the Bush Administration deployed another more than 3,500 troops to Afghanistan to expand the fight against the Taliban.

On 12 May 2007, ISAF forces killed Mullah Dadullah. Eleven other Taliban fighters died in the same firefight.

During the summer, NATO forces achieved tactical victories at the Battle of Chora in Orūzgān, where Dutch and Australian ISAF forces were deployed.

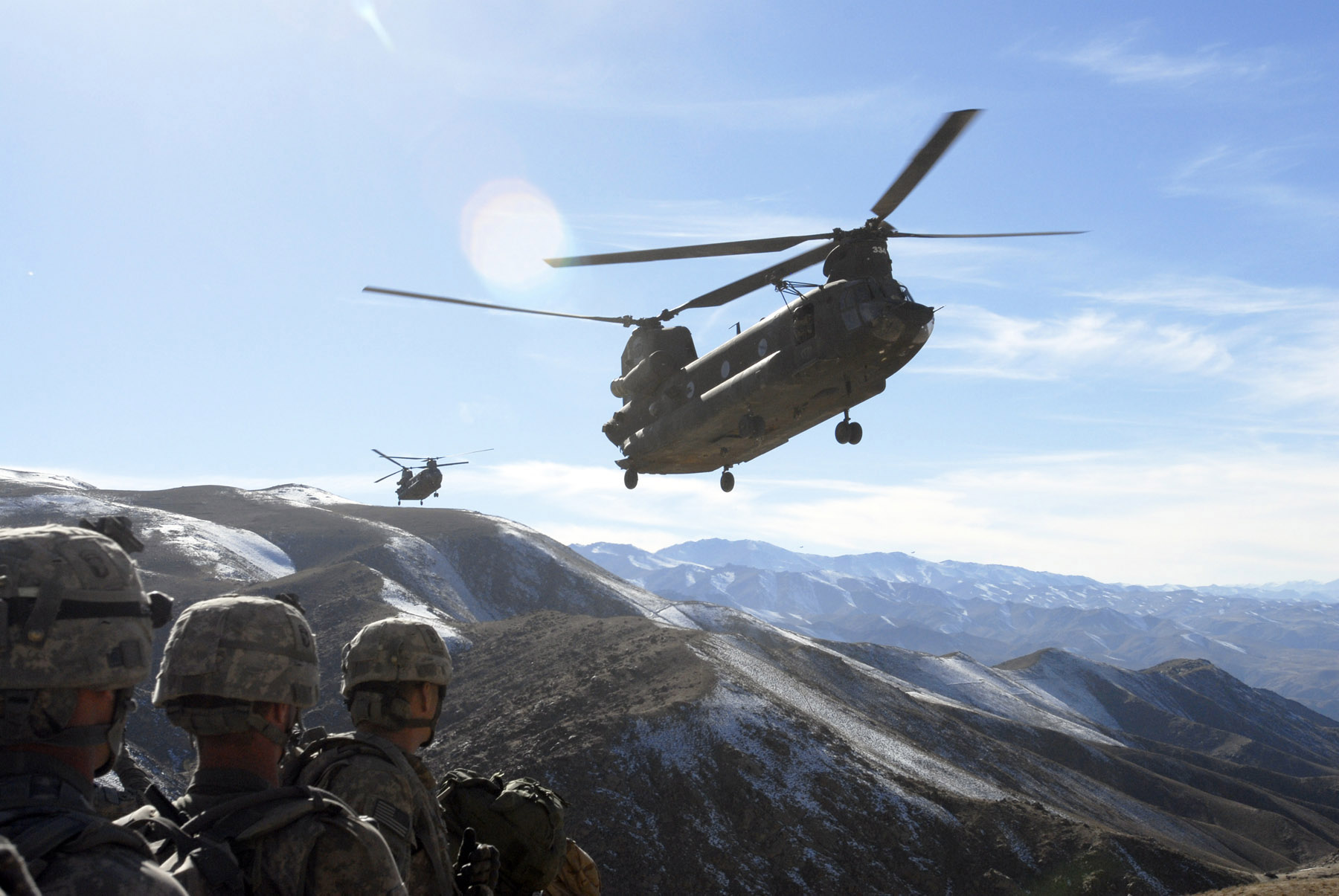
Chinooks transporting troops to Bagram

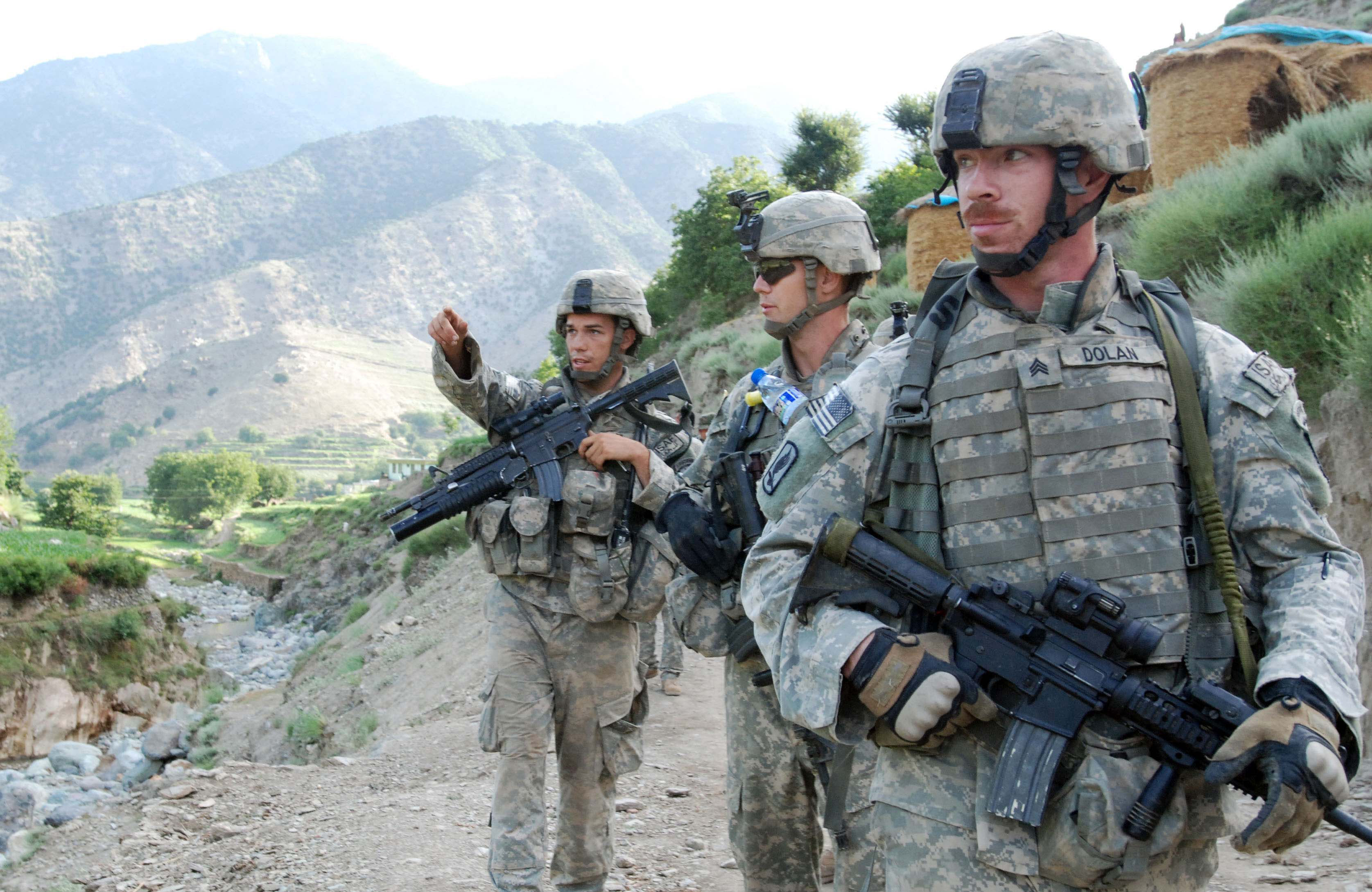
US Army paratroopers navigate to Observation Post Chuck Norris in Dangam.

On 16 August, eight civilians including a pregnant woman and a baby died when, few hours after an insurgent IED ambush damaged a Polish wheeled armored vehicle, Polish soldiers shelled the village of Nangar Khel, Paktika Province. Seven soldiers were charged with war crimes, after locals stated the Polish unit fired mortar rounds and machine guns into a wedding celebration without provocation, but they were cleared of all charges in 2011.

On 28 October about 80 Taliban fighters were killed in a 24-hour battle in Helmand.

Western officials and analysts estimated the strength of Taliban forces at about 10,000 fighters fielded at any given time. Of that number, only 2,000 to 3,000 were highly motivated, full-time insurgents. The rest were volunteer units, made up of young Afghans, angered by deaths of Afghan civilians in military airstrikes and American detention of Muslim prisoners who had been held for years without being charged. In 2007, more foreign fighters came into Afghanistan than ever before, according to officials. Approximately 100 to 300 full-time combatants were foreigners, many from Pakistan, Uzbekistan, Chechnya, various Arab countries and perhaps even Turkey and western China. They were reportedly more violent, incontrollable and extreme, often bringing superior video-production or bombmaking expertise.

On 2 November security forces killed a top-ranking militant, Mawlawi Abdul Manan, after he was caught crossing the border. The Taliban confirmed his death. On 10 November the Taliban ambushed a patrol in eastern Afghanistan. This attack brought the US death toll for 2007 to 100, making it the Americans' deadliest year in Afghanistan.

The Battle of Musa Qala took place in December. Afghan units were the principal fighting force, supported by British forces. Taliban forces were forced out of the town.

== Reassessment and renewed commitment 2008 ==
Development of ISAF troop strength

Admiral Mike Mullen, Chairman of the Joint Chiefs of Staff, said that while the situation in Afghanistan is "precarious and urgent", the 10,000 additional troops needed there would be unavailable "in any significant manner" unless withdrawals from Iraq are made. The priority was Iraq first, Afghanistan second.

In the first five months of 2008, the number of US troops in Afghanistan increased by over 80% with a surge of 21,643 more troops, bringing the total from 26,607 in January to 48,250 in June. In September 2008, President Bush announced the withdrawal of over 8,000 from Iraq and a further increase of up to 4,500 in Afghanistan.

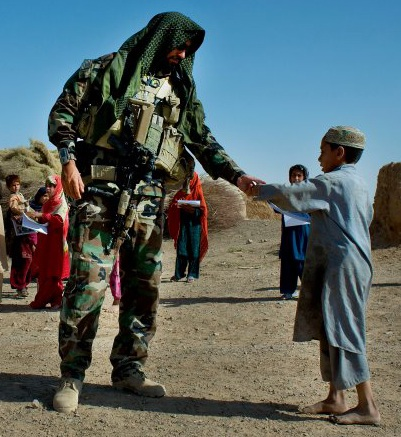
A US Army Special Forces medic in Kandahar Province in September 2008

In June 2008, British prime minister Gordon Brown announced the number of British troops serving in Afghanistan would increase to 8,030—a rise of 230. The same month, the UK lost its 100th serviceperson.

On 13 June, Taliban fighters demonstrated their ongoing strength, liberating all prisoners in Kandahar jail. The operation freed 1200 prisoners, 400 of whom were Taliban, causing a major embarrassment for NATO.

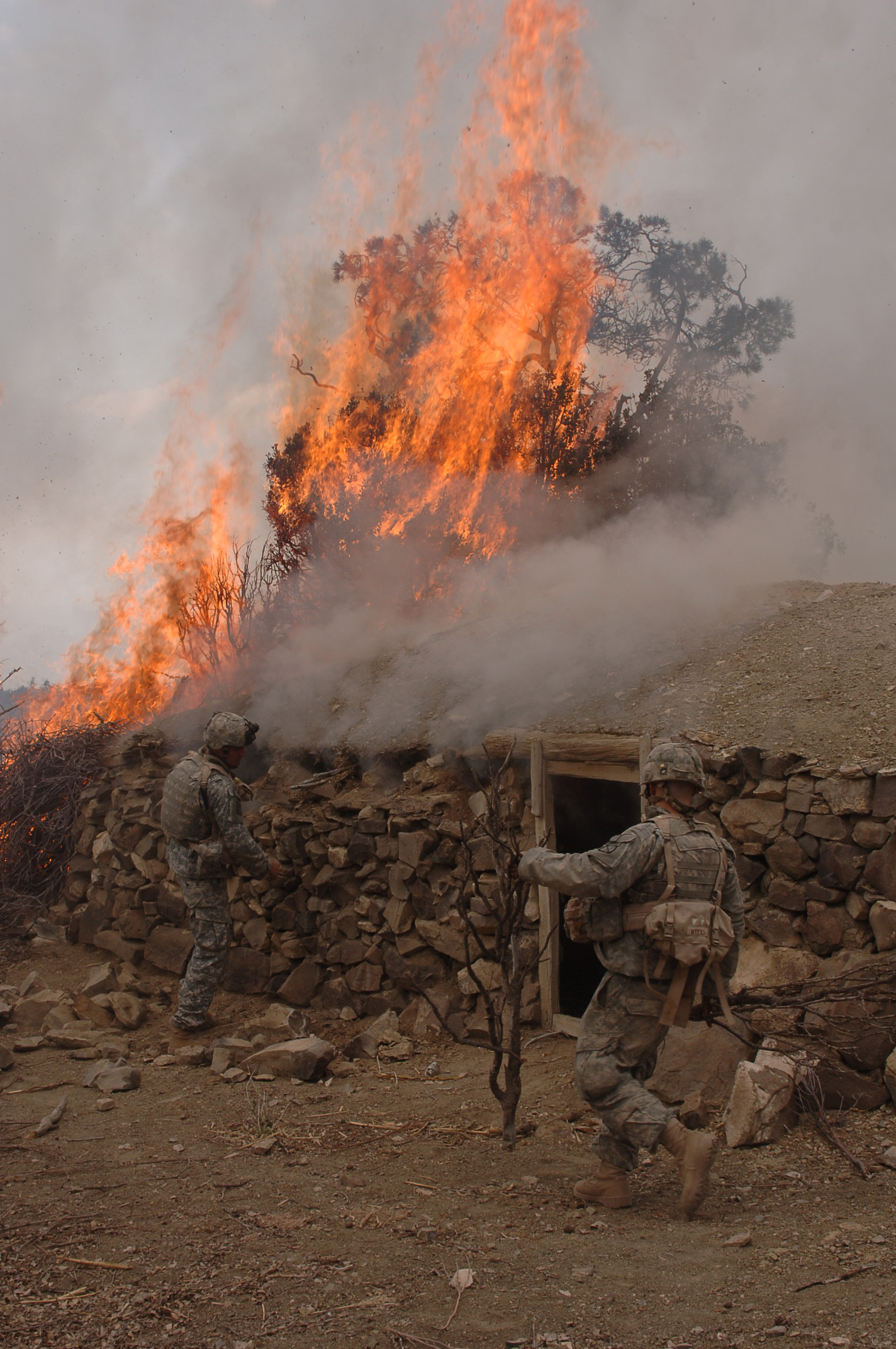
US troops burn a suspected Taliban safe house

On 13 July 2008, a coordinated Taliban attack was launched on a remote NATO base at Wanat in Kunar province. On 19 August, French troops suffered their worst losses in Afghanistan in an ambush with 10 soldiers killed in action and 21 injured. Later in the month, an airstrike targeted a Taliban commander in Herat province and killed 90 civilians.

Late August saw one of NATO's largest operations in Helmand, Operation Eagle's Summit, aiming to bring electricity to the region.

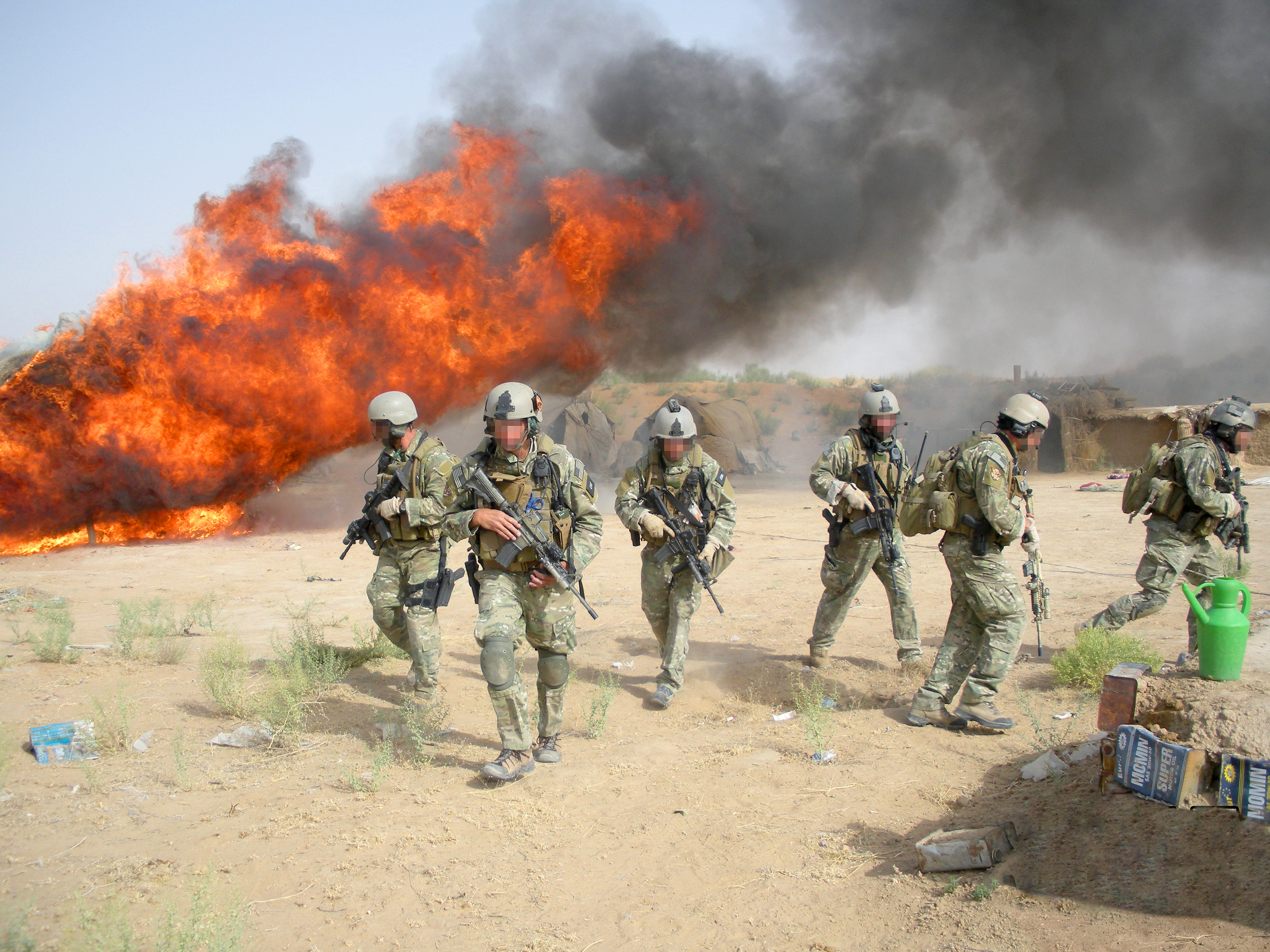
Burning hashish seized in Operation Albatross, a combined operation of Afghan officials, NATO and the DEA

On 3 September, commandos, believed to be US Army Special Forces, landed by helicopter and attacked three houses close to a known enemy stronghold in Pakistan. The attack killed between seven and 20 people. Local residents claimed that most of the dead were civilians. Pakistan condemned the attack, calling the incursion "a gross violation of Pakistan's territory".

On 6 September, in an apparent reaction, Pakistan announced an indefinite disconnection of supply lines.

On 11 September, militants killed two US troops in the East. This brought the total number of US losses to 113, more than in any prior year. Several European countries set their own records, particularly the UK, who suffered 108 casualties.

== Taliban attacks on supply lines 2008 ==
In November and December 2008, multiple incidents of major theft, robbery, and arson attacks afflicted NATO supply convoys in Pakistan. Transport companies south of Kabul were extorted for money by the Taliban. These incidents included the hijacking of a NATO convoy carrying supplies in Peshawar, the torching of cargo trucks and Humvees east of the Khyber pass and a half-dozen raids on NATO supply depots near Peshawar that destroyed 300 cargo trucks and Humvees in December 2008.

== US action into Pakistan 2008–2009 ==
An unnamed senior Pentagon official told the BBC that at some point between 12 July – 12 September 2008, President Bush issued a classified order authorizing raids against militants in Pakistan. Pakistan said it would not allow foreign forces onto its territory and that it would vigorously protect its sovereignty. In September, the Pakistan military stated that it had issued orders to "open fire" on US soldiers who crossed the border in pursuit of militant forces.

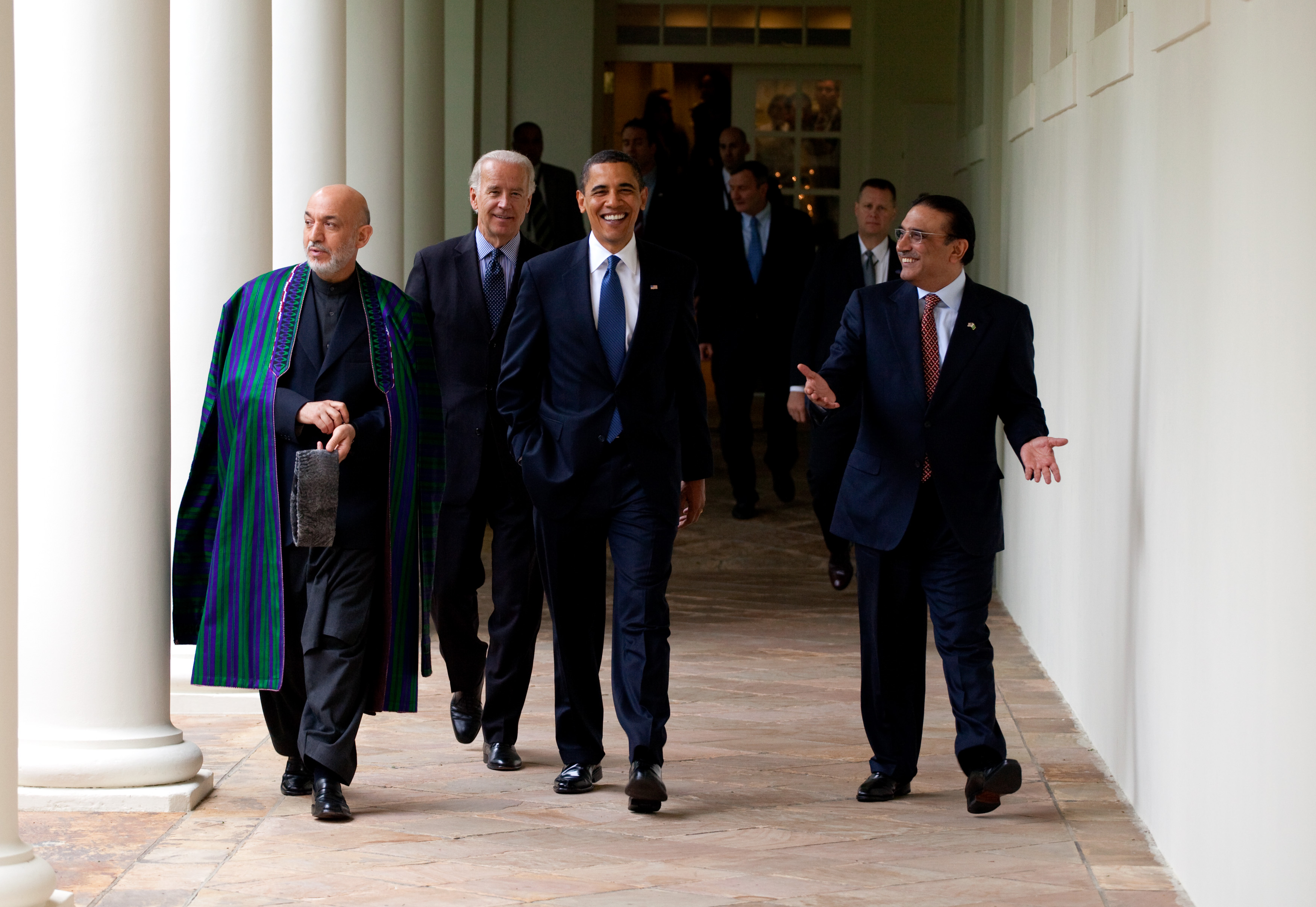
Barack Obama with Afghan President Hamid Karzai and Pakistani President Asif Ali Zardari in 2009

On 25 September 2008, Pakistani troops fired on ISAF helicopters. This caused confusion and anger in the Pentagon, which asked for a full explanation into the incident and denied that US helicopters were in Pakistani airspace. Chief Pakistani military spokesman Major General Athar Abbas said that the helicopters had "crossed into our territory in Ghulam Khan area. They passed over our checkpost so our troops fired warning shots". A few days later a CIA drone crashed into Pakistan territory.

A further split occurred when US troops apparently landed on Pakistani soil to carry out an operation against militants in the Khyber Pakhtunkhwa Province. Pakistanis reacted angrily to the action, saying that 20 innocent villagers had been killed by US troops. However, despite tensions, the US increased the use of remotely piloted drone aircraft in Pakistan's border regions, in particular the Federally Administered Tribal Areas (FATA) and Balochistan; as of early 2009, drone attacks were up 183% since 2006.

By the end of 2008, the Taliban apparently had severed remaining ties with al-Qaeda. According to senior US military intelligence officials, perhaps fewer than 100 members of al-Qaeda remained in Afghanistan.

In a meeting with General Stanley McChrystal, Pakistani military officials urged international forces to remain on the Afghan side of the border and prevent militants from fleeing into Pakistan. Pakistan noted that it had deployed 140,000 soldiers on its side of the border to address militant activities, while the coalition had only 100,000 soldiers to police the Afghanistan side.

== 2009 US reinforcements, Taliban progress ==
=== Northern Distribution Network ===
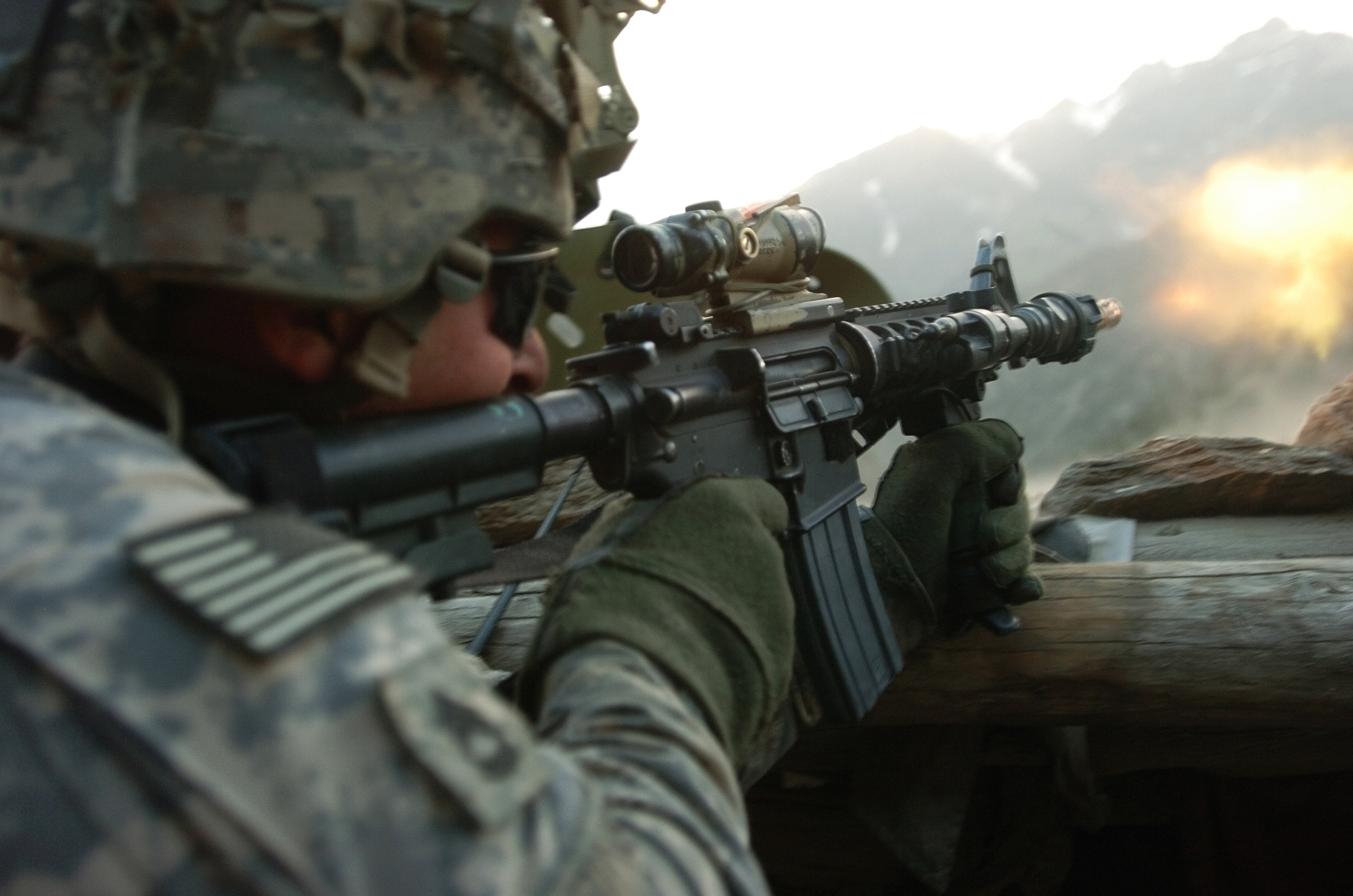
A US Army soldier with 1st Battalion, 32nd Infantry Regiment, 10th Mountain Division, fires his weapon during a battle with insurgent forces in Barge Matal, during Operation Mountain Fire in 2009.

In response to the increased risk of sending supplies through Pakistan, work began on the establishment of a Northern Distribution Network (NDN) through Russia and Central Asian republics. Initial permission to move supplies through the region was given on January 20, 2009, after a visit to the region by General David Petraeus. The first shipment along the NDN route left on 20 February from Riga, Latvia, then traveled 5,169 km (3,212 mi) to the Uzbek town of Termez on the Afghanistan border. In addition to Riga, other European ports included Poti, Georgia and Vladivostok, Russia. US commanders hoped that 100 containers a day would be shipped along the NDN. By comparison, 140 containers a day were typically shipped through the Khyber Pass. By 2011, the NDN handled about 40% of Afghanistan-bound traffic, versus 30% through Pakistan.

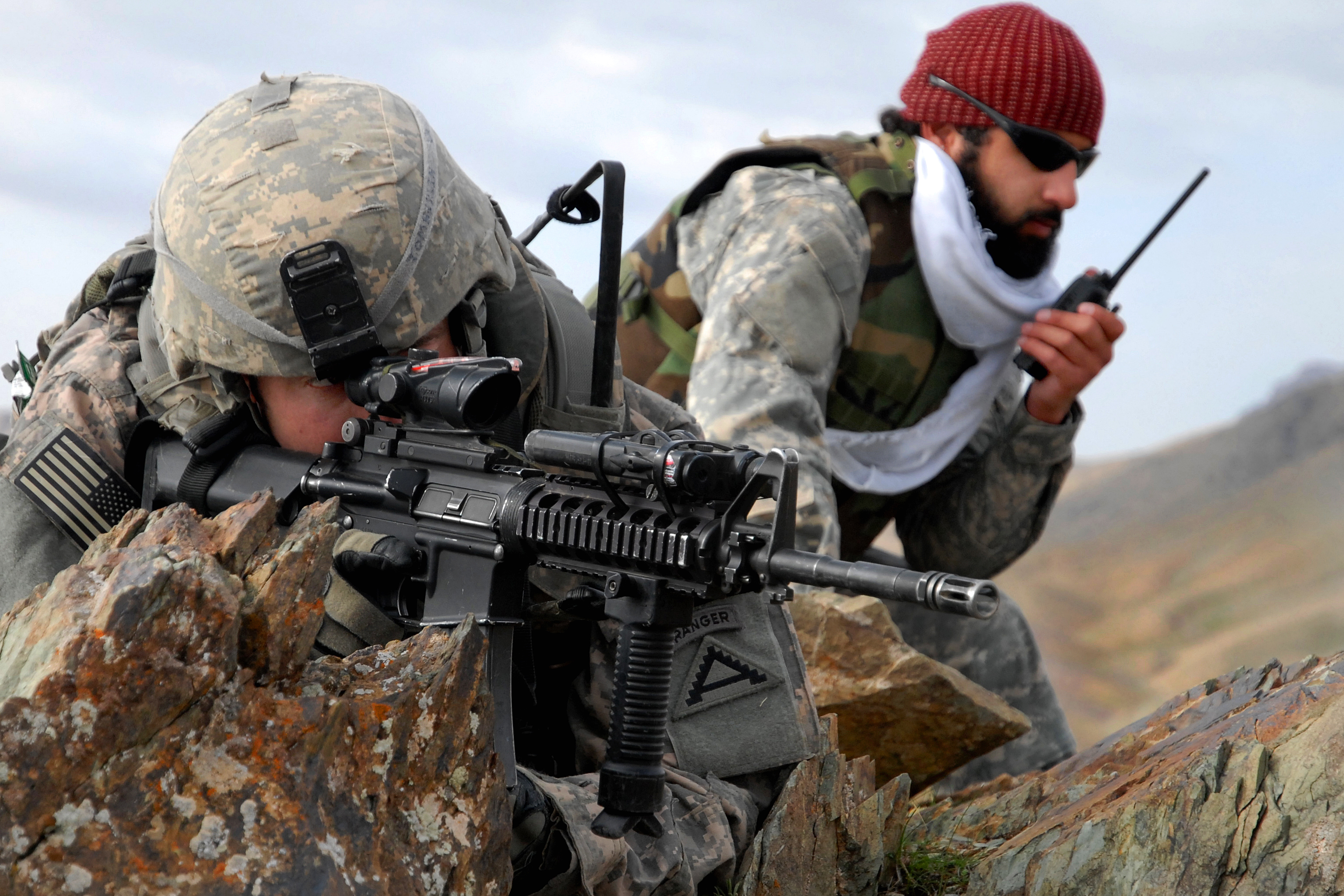
A US soldier and an Afghan interpreter in Zabul, 2009

On 11 May 2009, Uzbekistan president Islam Karimov announced that the airport in Navoiy (Uzbekistan) was being used to transport non-lethal cargo into Afghanistan. Due to the still unsettled relationship between Uzbekistan and the US following the 2005 Andijon massacre and subsequent expulsion of US forces from Karshi-Khanabad airbase, US forces were not involved in the shipments. Instead, South Korea's Korean Air, which overhauled Navoi's airport, officially handled logistics.

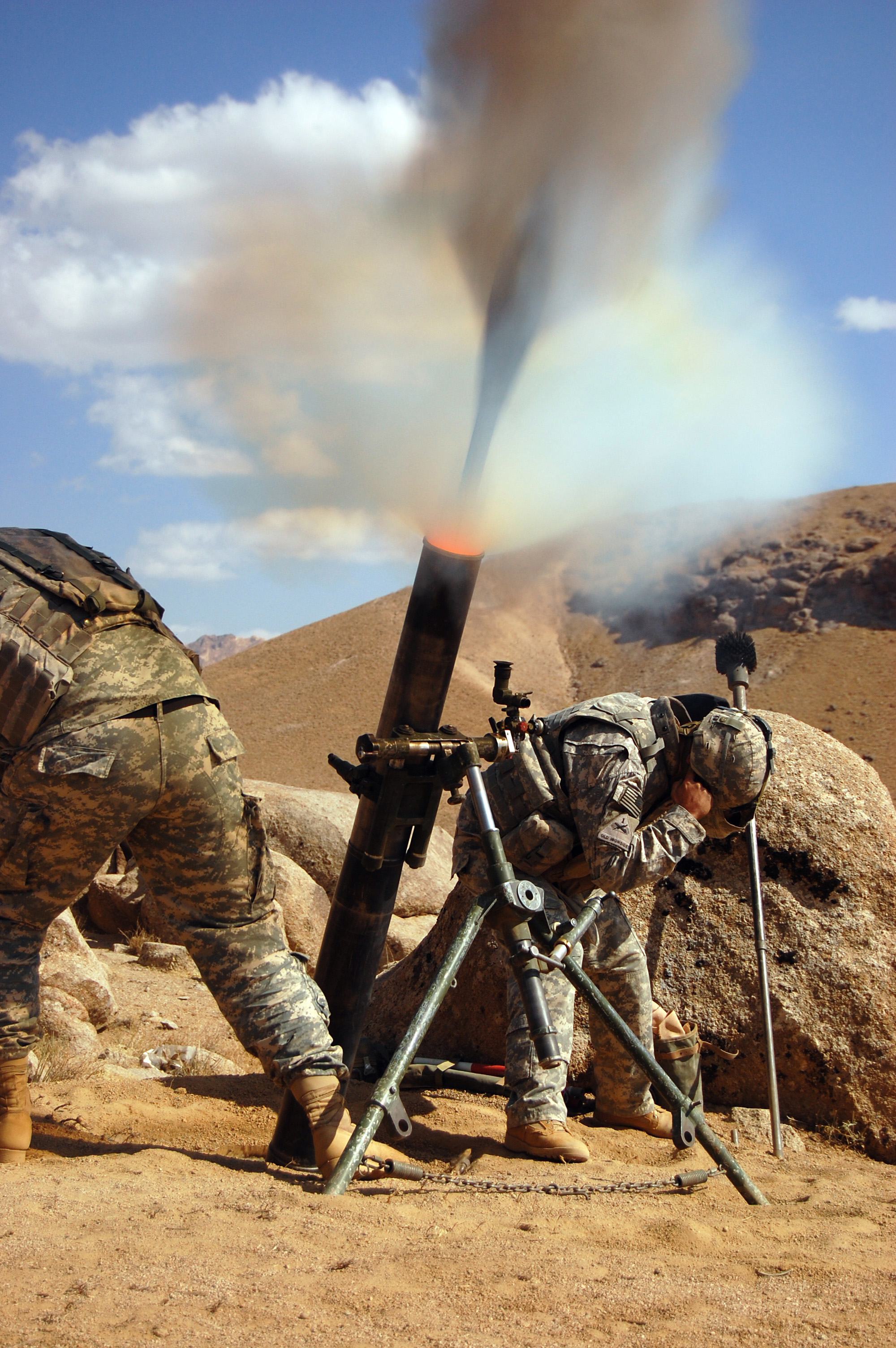
US soldiers fire mortars in Zabul.

Originally only non-lethal resources were allowed on the NDN. In July 2009, however, shortly before a visit by new President Barack Obama to Moscow, Russian authorities announced that US troops and weapons could use the country's airspace to reach Afghanistan.

Human rights advocates were (as of 2009) concerned that the US was again working with the government of Uzbekistan, which is often accused of violating human rights. US officials promised increased cooperation with Uzbekistan, including further assistance to turn Navoi into a regional distribution center for both military and civilian ventures.

=== 2009 Increase in US troops ===
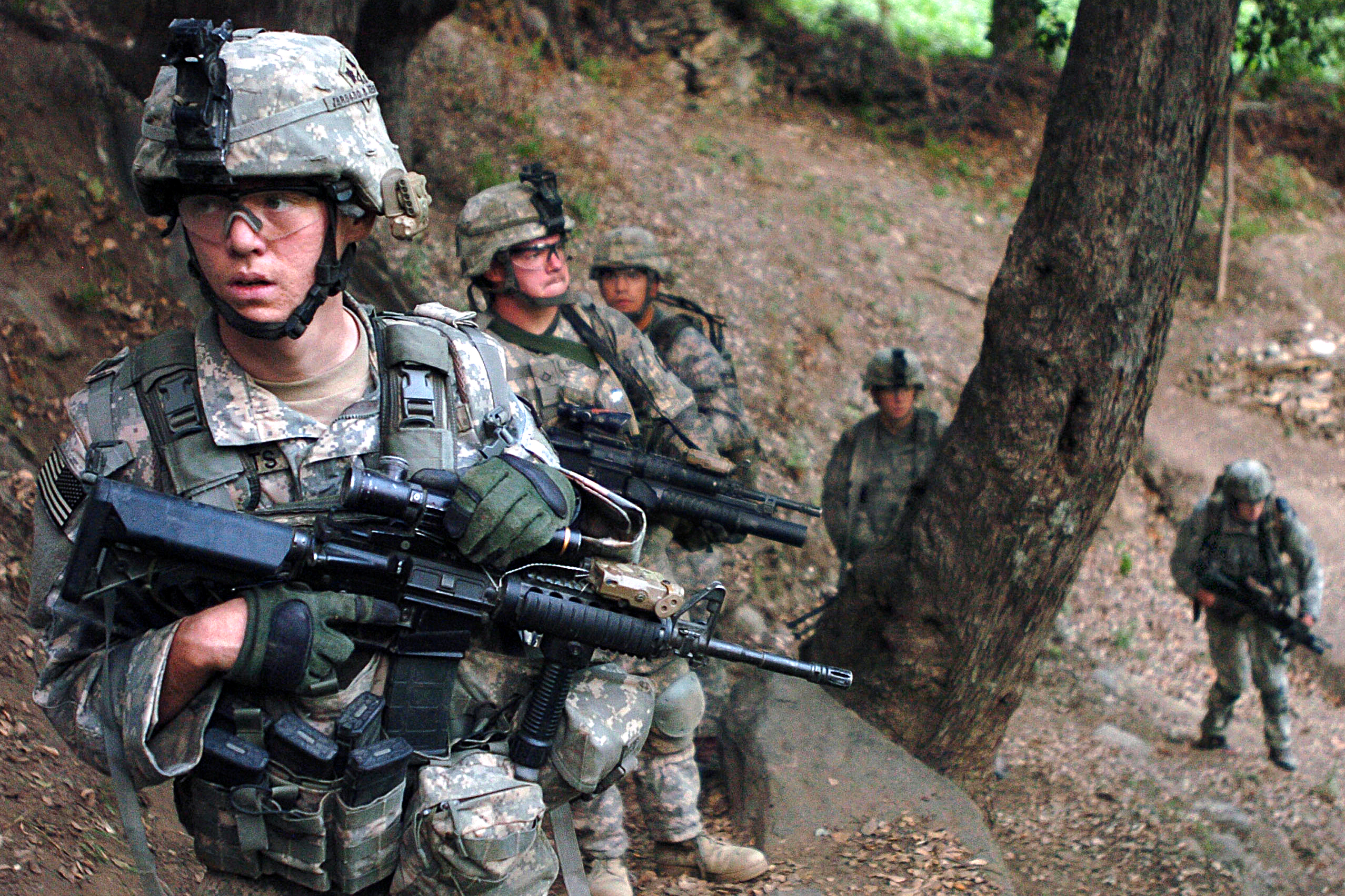
US Army soldiers patrol the Korangal Valley in Kunar province.

In January 2009, about 3,000 US soldiers from the 3rd Brigade Combat Team of the 10th Mountain Division moved into the provinces of Logar, Wardak, and Kunar. Afghan Federal Guards fought alongside them. The troops were the first wave of an expected surge of reinforcements originally ordered by President Bush and increased by President Obama.

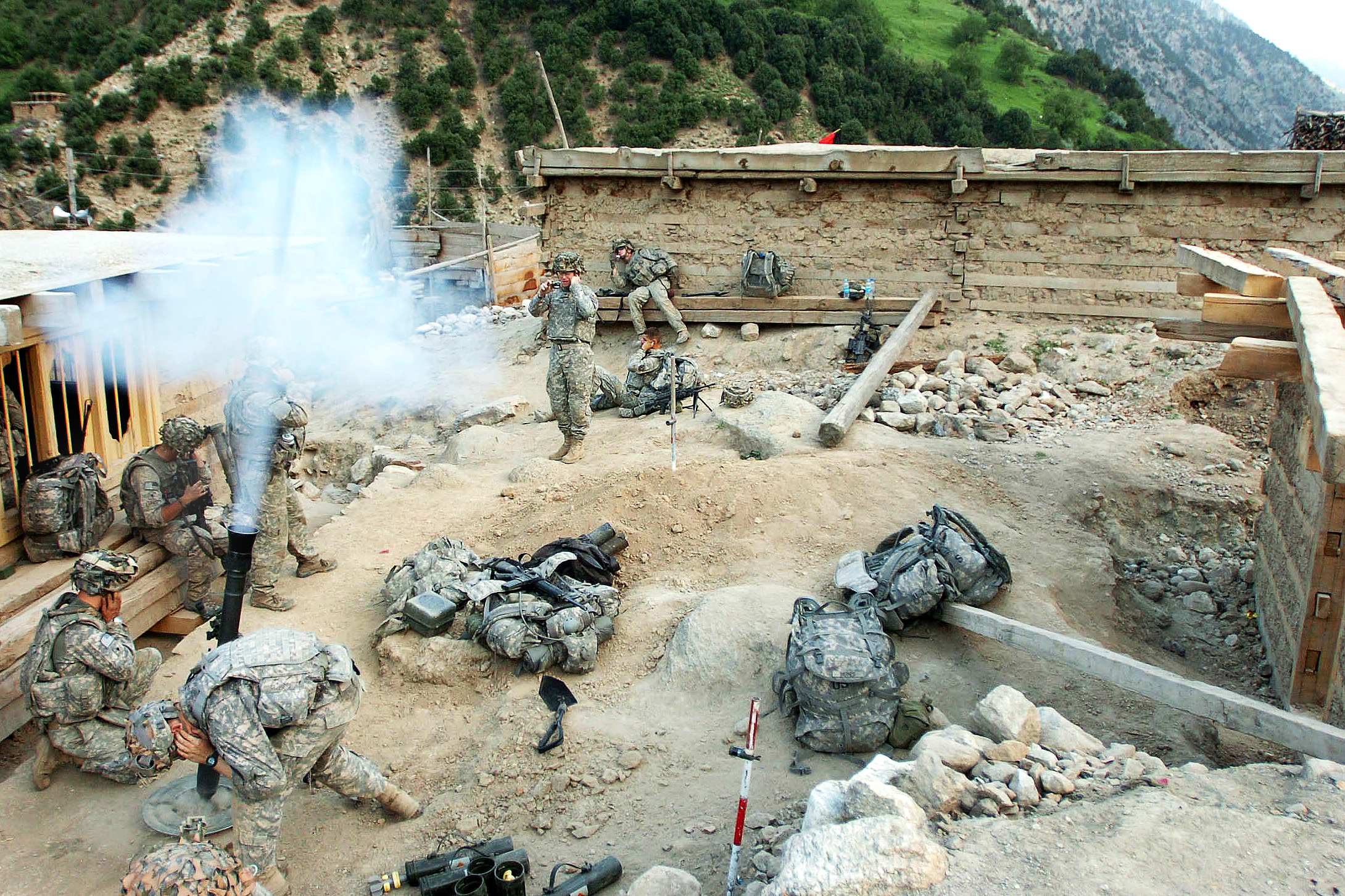
US Army soldiers fire mortar rounds at suspected Taliban fighting positions in Nuristan province.

In mid-February 2009, it was announced that 17,000 additional troops would be deployed in two brigades and support troops; the 2nd Marine Expeditionary Brigade of about 3,500 and the 5th Brigade, 2nd Infantry Division, a Stryker Brigade with about 4,000. ISAF commander General David McKiernan had called for as many as 30,000 additional troops, effectively doubling the number of troops. On 23 September, a classified assessment by General McChrystal included his conclusion that a successful counterinsurgency strategy would require 500,000 troops and five years.

In November 2009, Ambassador Karl W. Eikenberry sent two classified cables to Washington expressing concerns about sending more troops before the Afghan government demonstrates that it is willing to tackle the corruption and mismanagement that has fueled the Taliban's rise. Eikenberry, a retired three-star general who in 2006–2007 commanded US troops in Afghanistan, also expressed frustration with the relative paucity of funds set aside for development and reconstruction. In subsequent cables, Eikenberry repeatedly cautioned that deploying sizable American reinforcements would result in "astronomical costs"—tens of billions of dollars—and would only deepen the Afghan government's dependence on the United States.

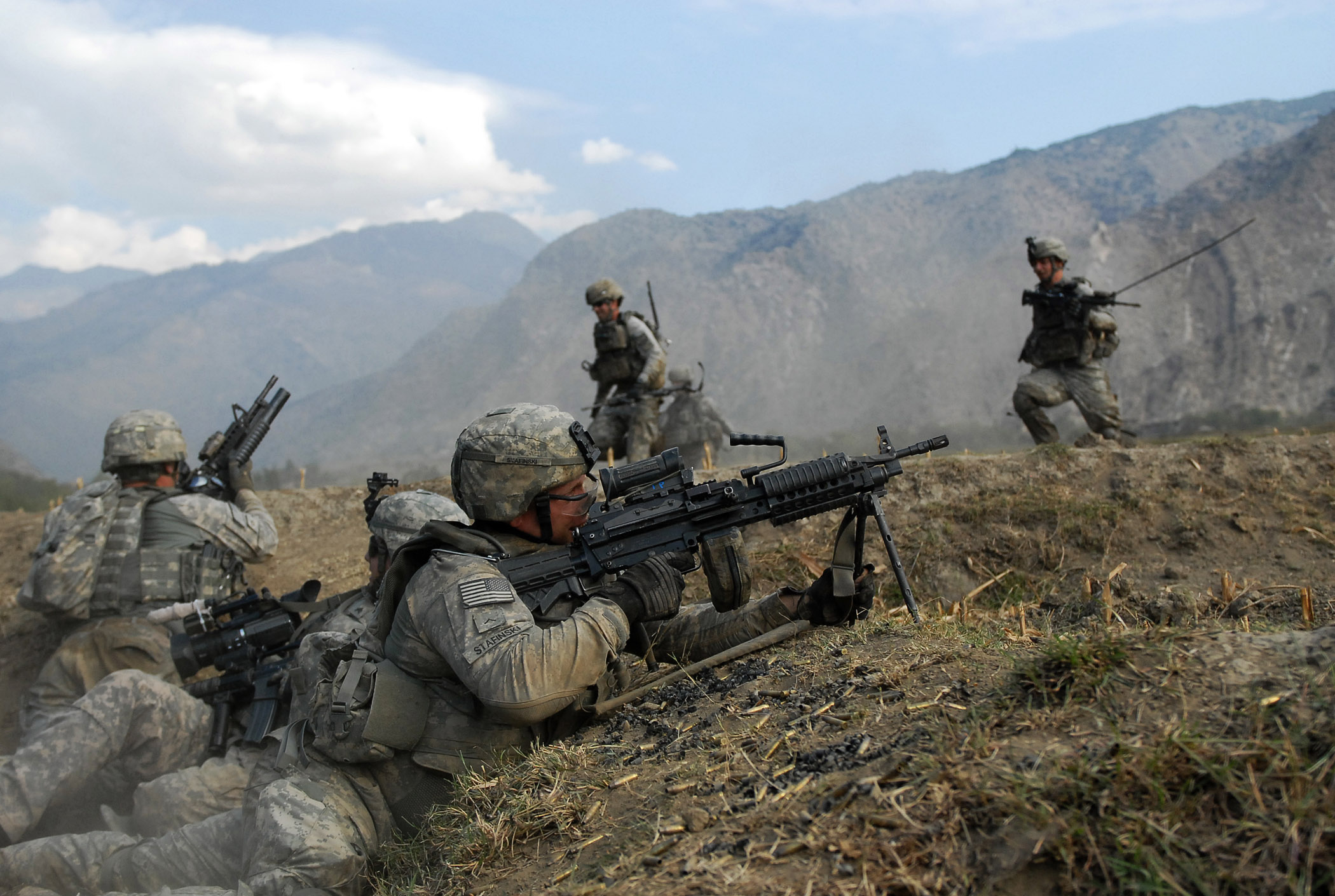
US Army soldiers watch the surrounding hills for insurgents during a three-hour gun battle in Kunar province.

On 26 November 2009, Karzai made a public plea for direct negotiations with the Taliban leadership. Karzai said there is an "urgent need" for negotiations and made it clear that the Obama administration had opposed such talks. There was no formal US response.

On 1 December, Obama announced at the US Military Academy in West Point that the US would send 30,000 more troops. Antiwar organizations in the US responded quickly, and cities throughout the US saw protests on 2 December. Many protesters compared the decision to deploy more troops in Afghanistan to the expansion of the Vietnam War under the Johnson administration.

=== 2009 Increase in Drone strikes in Pakistan ===
In 2009, the Drone strikes in Pakistan increased substantially under the administration of United States President Barack Obama that previously began during the administration of United States President George W. Bush. against Taliban and Al-Qaeda militants. Some in the media have referred to the attacks as a "drone war".

In August 2009, Baitullah Mehsud, the leader of the Tehrik-i-Taliban Pakistan TTP was killed in a drone strike, which was one of the early successes of the Obama administration

=== Kunduz airstrike ===
On 4 September, during the Kunduz Province Campaign a devastating NATO air raid was conducted 7 kilometers southwest of Kunduz where Taliban fighters had hijacked civilian supply trucks, killing up to 179 people, including over 100 civilians.

=== Operation Khanjar and Operation Panther's Claw ===
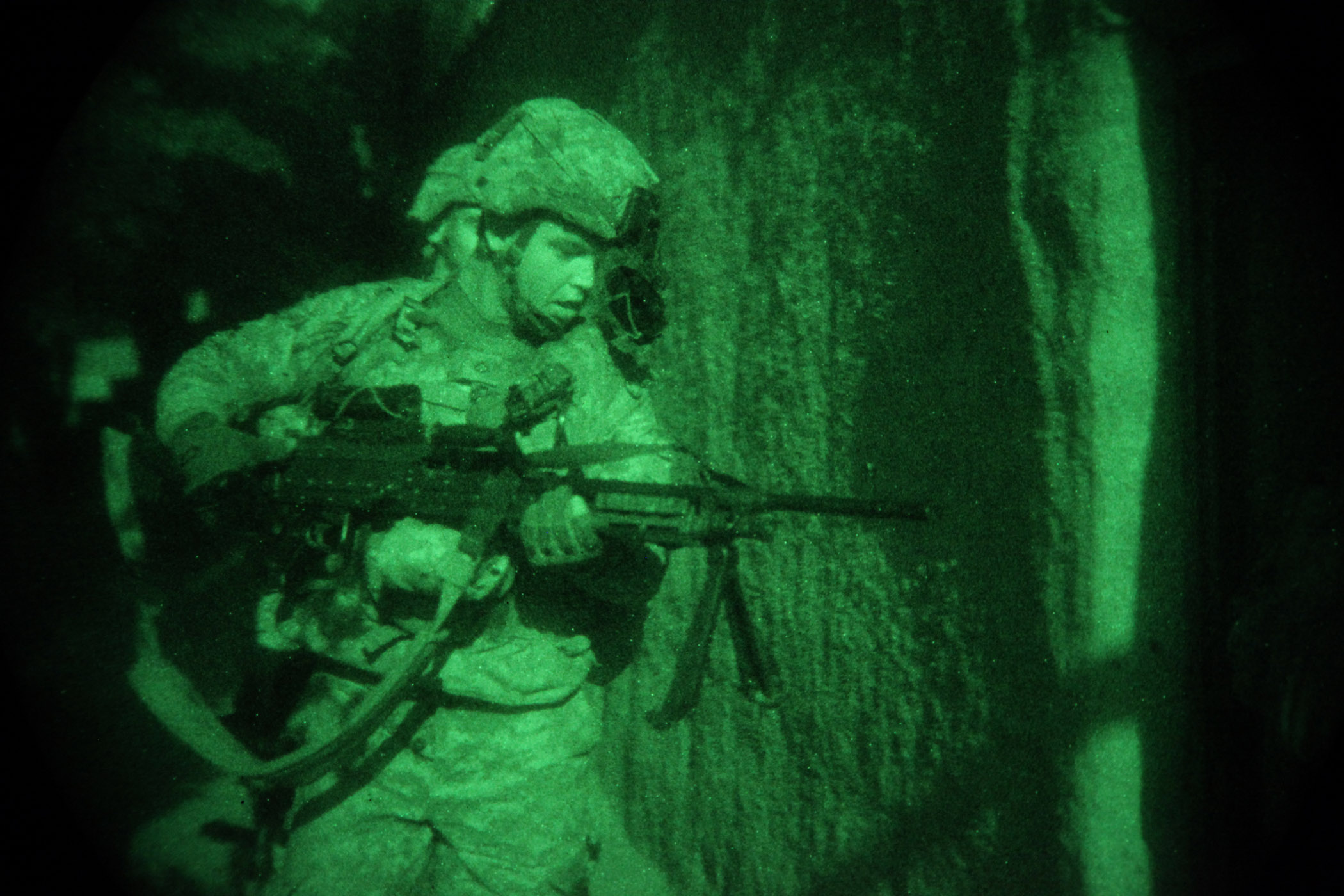
US soldiers conduct an operation.

On 25 June US officials announced the launch of Operation Khanjar ("strike of the sword"). About 4,000 US Marines from the 2nd Marine Expeditionary Brigade and 650 Afghan soldiers participated. Khanjar followed a British-led operation named Operation Panther's Claw in the same region. Officials called it the Marines' largest operation since the 2004 invasion of Fallujah, Iraq. Operation Panther's Claw was aimed to secure various canal and river crossings to establish a long-term ISAF presence.

Initially, Afghan and American soldiers moved into towns and villages along the Helmand River to protect the civilian population. The main objective was to push into insurgent strongholds along the river. A secondary aim was to bring security to the Helmand Valley in time for presidential elections, set to take place on 20 August.

=== Taliban gains ===
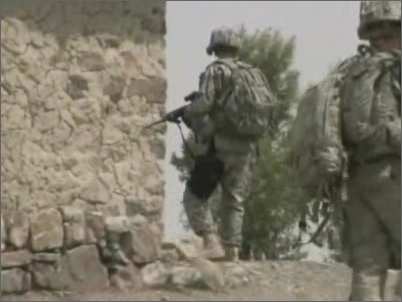
A soldier on patrol

According to a 22 December briefing by Major General Michael T. Flynn, the top US intelligence officer in Afghanistan, "The Taliban retains [the] required partnerships to sustain support, fuel legitimacy and bolster capacity." The 23-page briefing states that "Security incidents [are] projected to be higher in 2010." Those incidents were already up by 300 percent since 2007 and by 60 percent since 2008, according to the briefing. NATO intelligence at the time indicated that the Taliban had as many as 25,000 dedicated soldiers, almost as many as before 9/11 and more than in 2005.

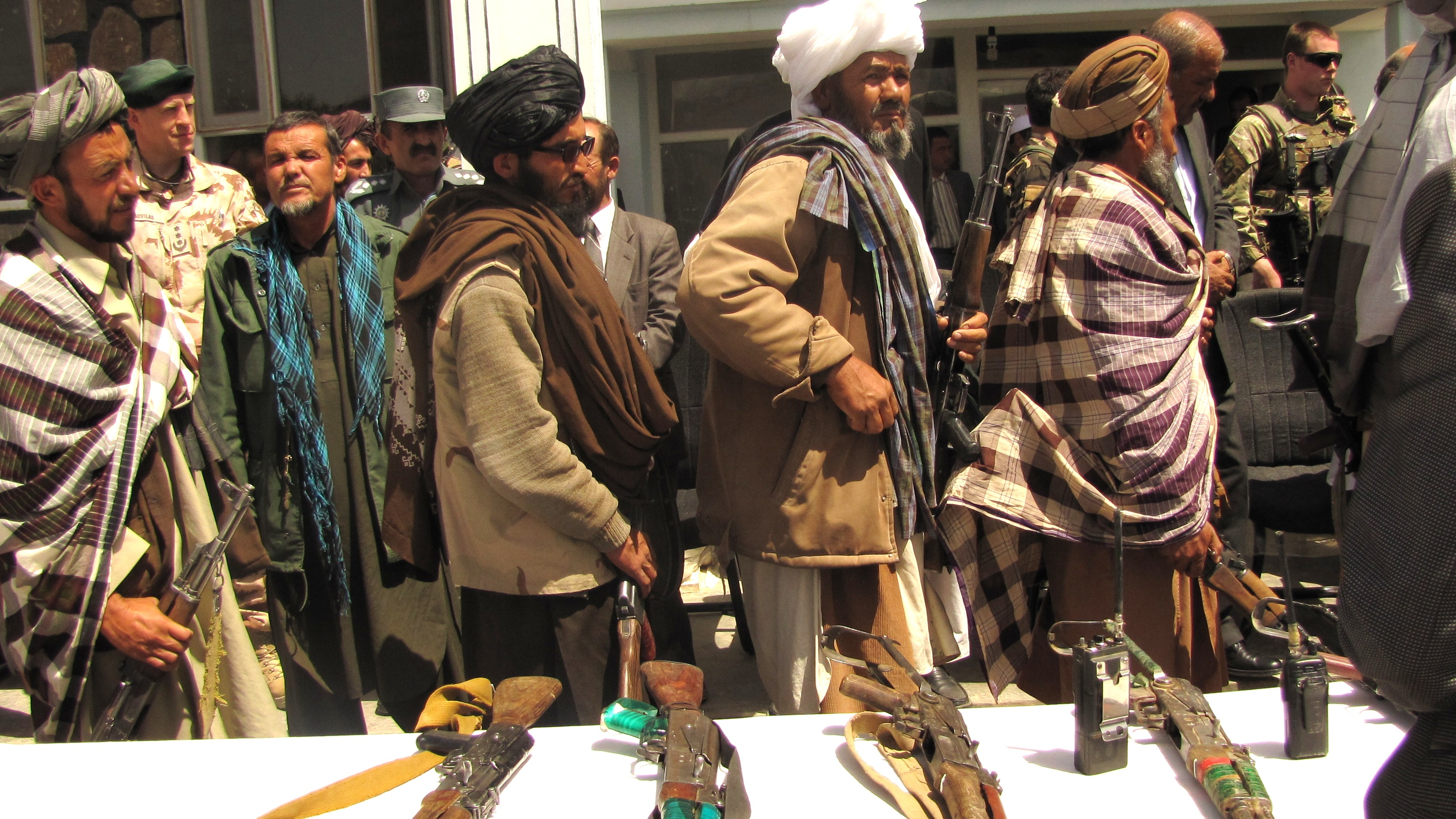
Former Taliban fighters turn in their weapons as part of a reintegration program

On 10 August McChrystal, newly appointed as US commander in Afghanistan, said that the Taliban had gained the upper hand. In a continuation of the Taliban's usual strategy of summer offensives, the militants aggressively spread their influence into north and west Afghanistan and stepped up their attack in an attempt to disrupt presidential polls. Calling the Taliban a "very aggressive enemy", he added that the US strategy was to stop their momentum and focus on protecting and safeguarding Afghan civilians, calling it "hard work".

The Taliban's claim that the over 135 violent incidents disrupting elections was largely disputed. However, the media was asked to not report on any violent incidents. Some estimates reported voter turn out as much less than the expected 70 percent. In southern Afghanistan where the Taliban held the most power, voter turnout was low and sporadic violence was directed at voters and security personnel. The chief observer of the European Union election mission, General Philippe Morillon, said the election was "generally fair" but "not free".

Western election observers had difficulty accessing southern regions, where at least 9 Afghan civilians and 14 security forces were killed in attacks intended to intimidate voters. The Taliban released a video days after the elections, filming on the road between Kabul and Kandahar, stopping vehicles and asking to see their fingers. The video went showed ten men who had voted, listening to a Taliban militant. The Taliban pardoned the voters because of Ramadan. The Taliban attacked towns with rockets and other indirect fire. Amid claims of widespread fraud, both top contenders, Hamid Karzai and Abdullah Abdullah, claimed victory. Reports suggested that turnout was lower than in the prior election.

After Karzai's alleged win of 54 per cent, which would prevent a runoff, over 400,000 Karzai votes had to be disallowed after accusations of fraud. Some nations criticized the elections as "free but not fair".

In December, an attack on Forward Operating Base Chapman, used by the CIA to gather information and to coordinate drone attacks against Taliban leaders, killed at least six CIA officers.

== 2010: American–British offensive and Afghan peace initiative ==
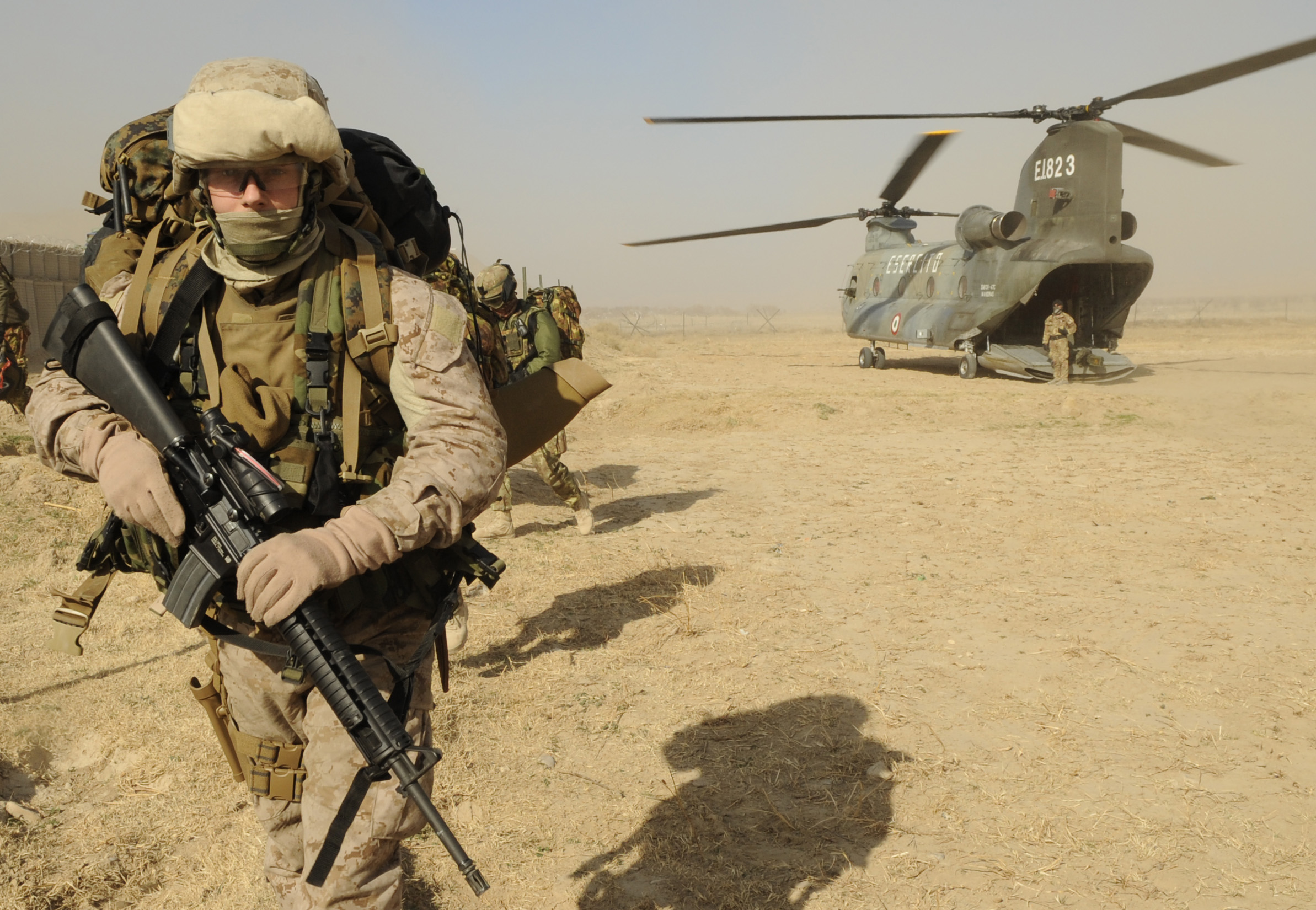
A US Marine Corps sergeant exits an Italian Army CH-47 Chinook helicopter, 30 November 2010.

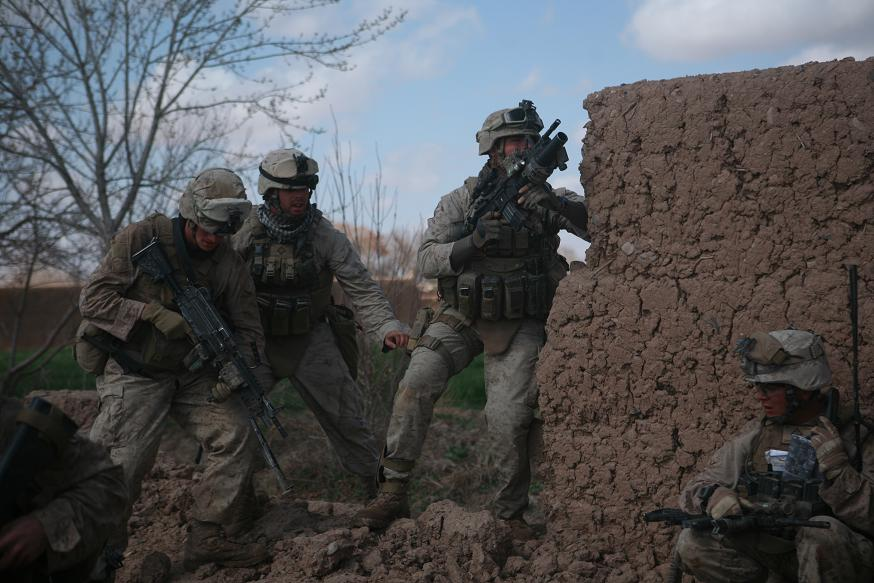
US Marines with Bravo Company, 1st Battalion, 6th Marine Regiment return fire on Taliban forces in Marjeh in February 2010.

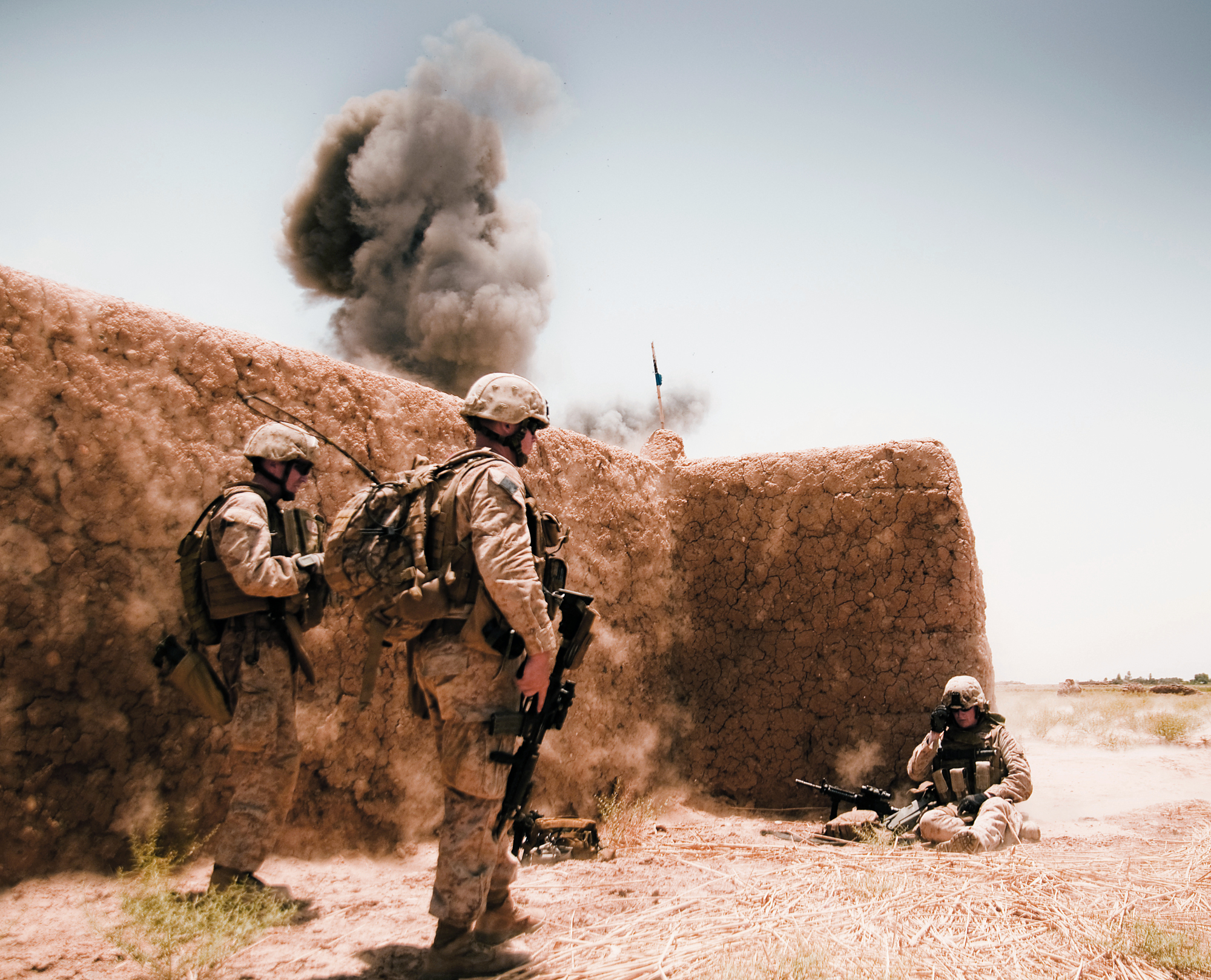
U.S. Marines with Explosive Ordnance Disposal (EOD) destroy an Improvised Explosive Device (IED) cache in Southern Shorsurak, Helmand province in June 2010.

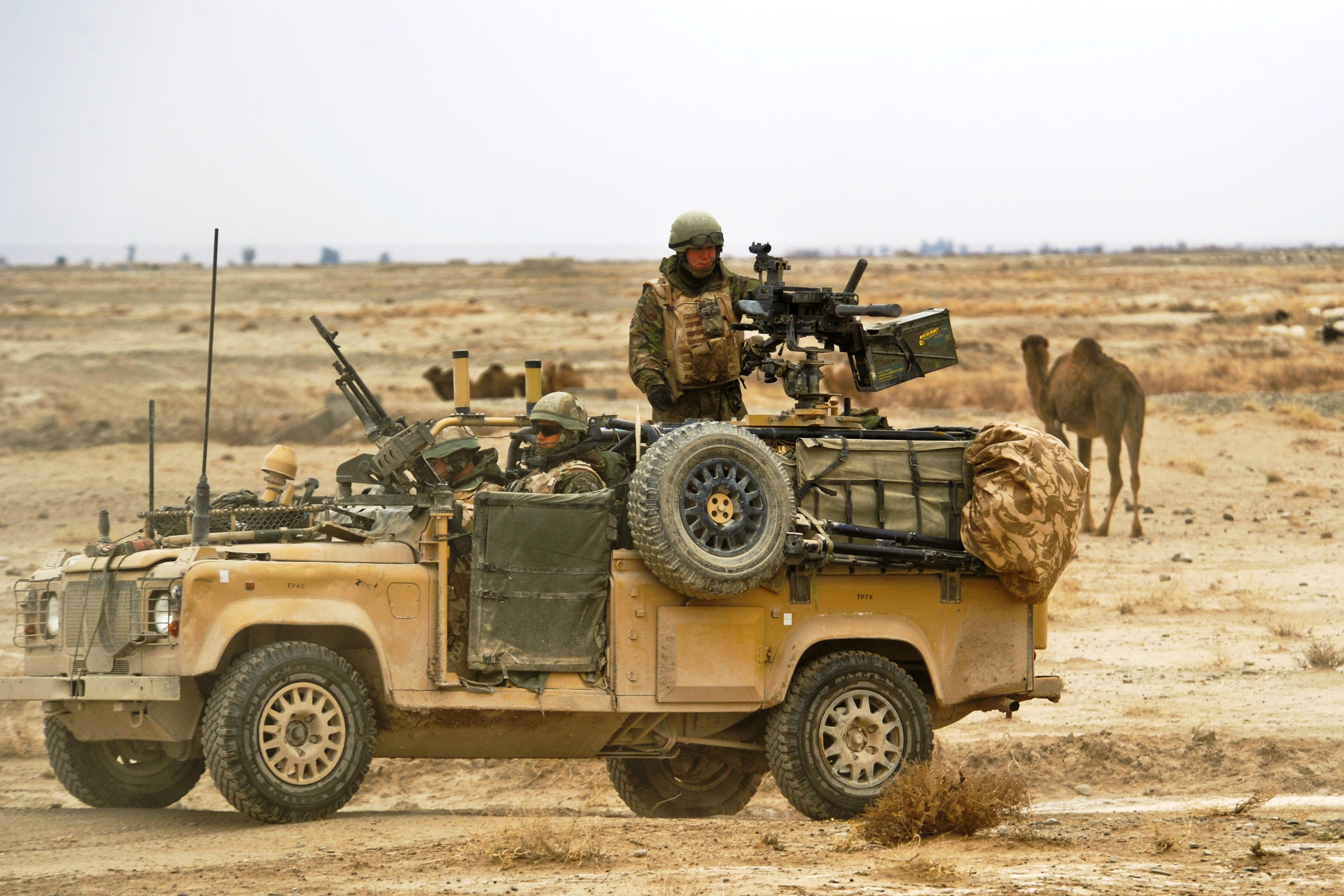
U.K. service members of the Royal Air Force Regiment stop on a road while conducting a combat mission near Kandahar Airfield, Afghanistan, 2 January 2010.

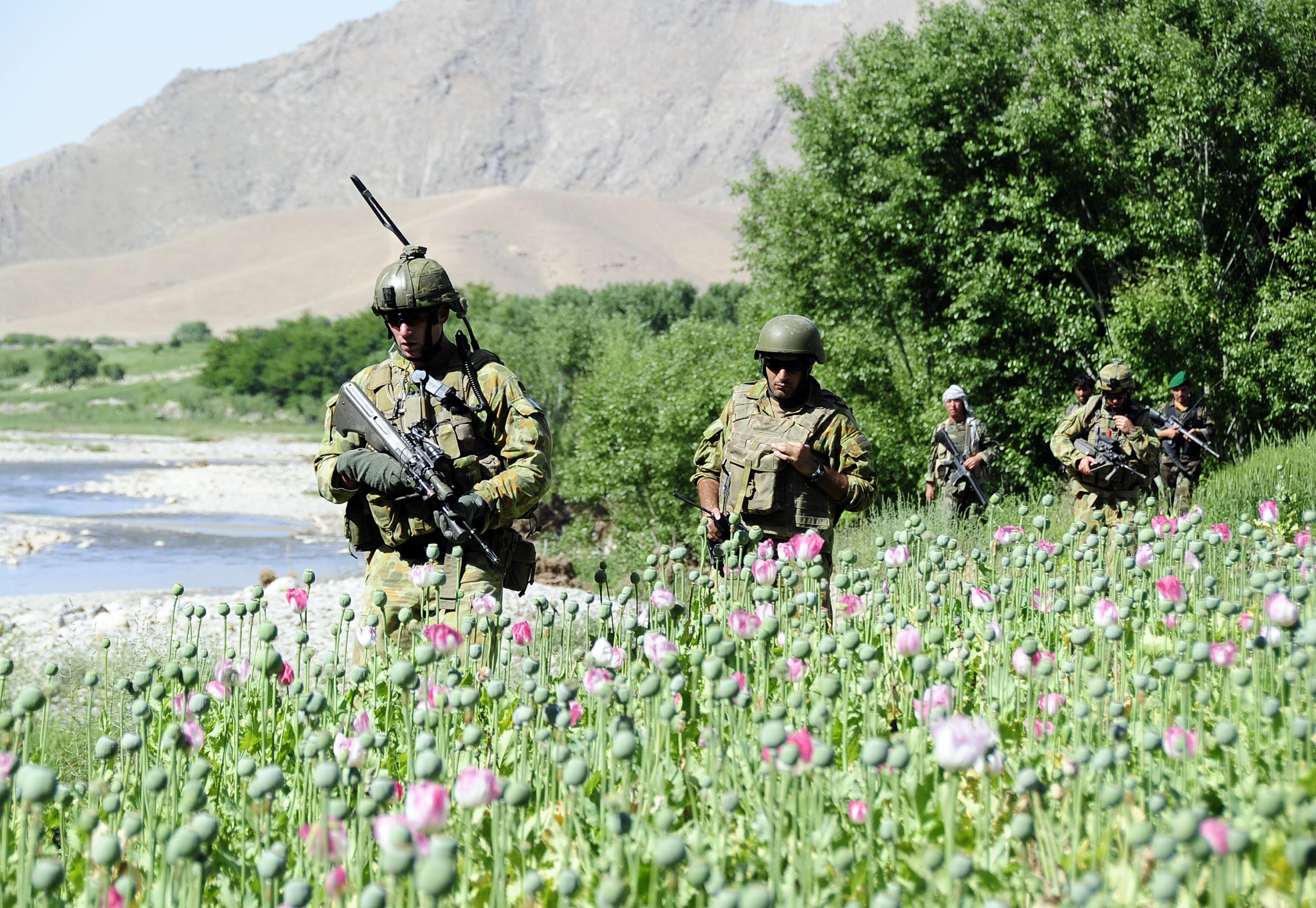
Australian and Afghan soldiers patrol the poppy fields in the Baluchi Valley Region, April 2010.

In public statements US officials had previously praised Pakistan's military effort against militants during its offensive in South Waziristan in November 2009. Karzai started peace talks with Haqqani network groups in March 2010. Other peace initiatives included the Afghan Peace Jirga 2010. In July 2010, a US Army report read: "It seems to always be this way when we go there [to meet civilians]. No one wants anything to do with us." A report on meeting up with school representatives mentioned students throwing rocks at soldiers and not welcoming their arrival, as had been reported on several occasions elsewhere. President Zardari said that Pakistan had spent over 35 billion US dollars during the previous eight years fighting against militancy. According to the Afghan government, approximately 900 Taliban were killed in operations conducted during 2010. Due to increased use of IEDs by insurgents the number of injured coalition soldiers, mainly Americans, significantly increased. Beginning in May 2010 NATO special forces began to concentrate on operations to capture or kill specific Taliban leaders. As of March 2011, the US military claimed that the effort had resulted in the capture or killing of more than 900 low- to mid-level Taliban commanders. Overall, 2010 saw the most insurgent attacks of any year since the war began, peaking in September at more than 1,500. Insurgent operations increased "dramatically" in two-thirds of Afghan provinces.

=== Troop surge ===
Deployment of additional US troops continued in early 2010, with 9,000 of the planned 30,000 in place before the end of March and another 18,000 expected by June, with the 101st Airborne Division as the main source and a Marine Expeditionary Force in the Helmand Province. US troops in Afghanistan outnumbered those in Iraq for the first time since 2003.

The CIA, following a request by General McChrystal, planned to increase teams of operatives, including elite SAD officers, with US military special operations forces. This combination worked well in Iraq and was largely credited with the success of that surge. The CIA also increased its campaign using Hellfire missile strikes on Al-Qaeda in Pakistan. The number of strikes in 2010, 115, more than doubled the 50 drone attacks that occurred in 2009.

The surge in troops supported a sixfold increase in Special Forces operations. 700 airstrikes occurred in September 2010 alone versus 257 in all of 2009. From July 2010 to October 2010, 300 Taliban commanders and 800 foot-soldiers were killed. Hundreds more insurgent leaders were killed or captured as 2010 ended. Petraeus said, "We've got our teeth in the enemy's jugular now, and we're not going to let go."

The CIA created Counter-terrorism Pursuit Teams (CTPT) staffed by Afghans at the war's beginning. This force grew to over 3,000 by 2010 and was considered one of the "best Afghan fighting forces". Firebase Lilley was one of SAD's nerve centers. These units were not only effective in operations against the Taliban and al-Qaeda forces in Afghanistan, but also expanded their operations into Pakistan. They were also important factors in both the "counterterrorism plus" and the full "counter-insurgency" options discussed by the Obama administration in the December 2010 review.

=== Battle of Marjah ===
In early February, Coalition and Afghan forces began highly visible plans for an offensive, codenamed Operation Moshtarak, on the Taliban stronghold near the village of Marjah. It began on 13 February and, according to US and Afghan officials, was the first operation where Afghan forces led the coalition. Led by the 2nd Marine Expeditionary Brigade (US), the offensive involved 15,000 US, British, Canadian, Estonian, Danish, French, and Afghan troops. It was the biggest joint operation since the 2001 invasion that ousted the Taliban. The troops were fighting over an area of less than 260 km^{2} (100 sq mi), with a population of 80,000.

=== WikiLeaks disclosure ===
On 25 July 2010, the release of 91,731 classified documents from the WikiLeaks organization was made public. The documents cover US military incident and intelligence reports from January 2004 to December 2009. Some of these documents included sanitized, and "covered up", accounts of civilian casualties caused by Coalition Forces. The reports included many references to other incidents involving civilian casualties like the Kunduz airstrike and Nangar Khel incident. The leaked documents also contain reports of Pakistan collusion with the Taliban. According to Der Spiegel, "the documents clearly show that the Pakistani intelligence agency Inter-Services Intelligence (usually known as the ISI) is the most important accomplice the Taliban has outside of Afghanistan."

=== Pakistan and US tensions ===
Tensions between Pakistan and the US were heightened in late September after several Pakistan Frontier Corps soldiers were killed and wounded. The troops were attacked by a US piloted aircraft that was pursuing Taliban forces near the Afghan-Pakistan border, but for unknown reasons opened fire on two Pakistan border posts. In retaliation for the strike, Pakistan closed the Torkham ground border crossing to NATO supply convoys for an unspecified period. This incident followed the release of a video allegedly showing uniformed Pakistan soldiers executing unarmed civilians. After the Torkham border closing, Pakistani Taliban attacked NATO convoys, killing several drivers and destroying around 100 tankers.

== 2011: US and NATO drawdown ==
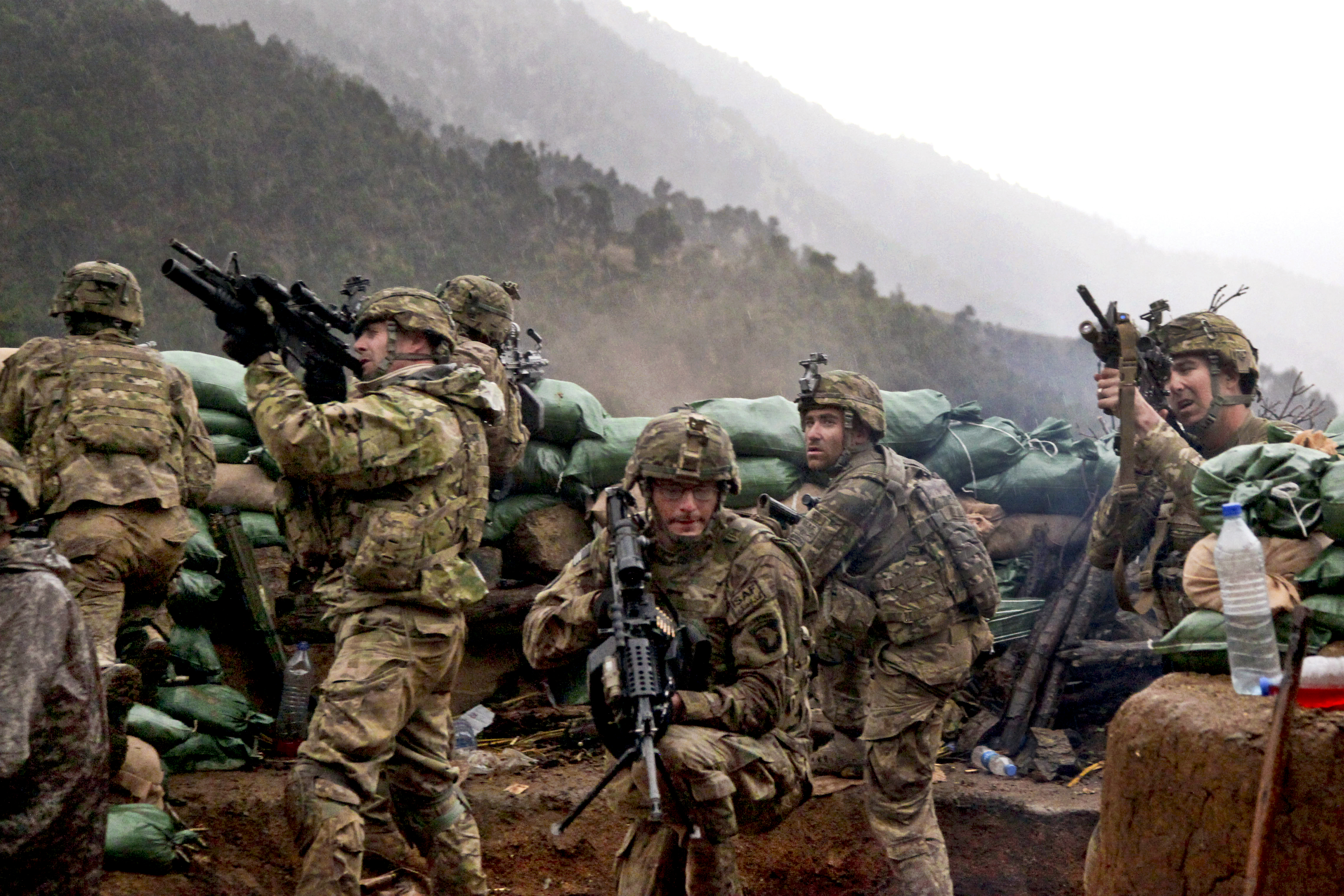
US Army soldiers return fire during a firefight with Taliban forces in Kunar Province, 31 March 2011

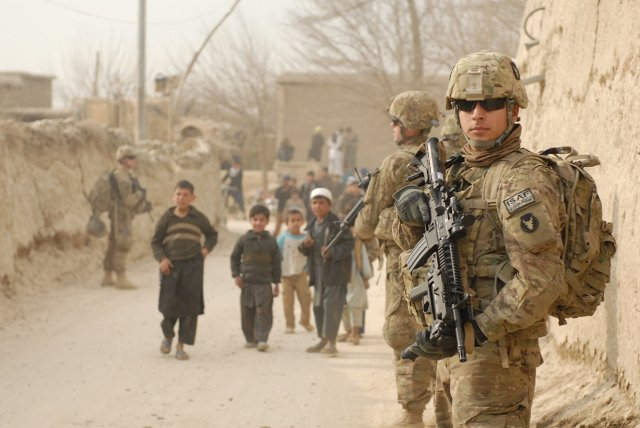
US Army National Guard soldiers patrol the villages in the Bagram Security Zone, 23 March 2011

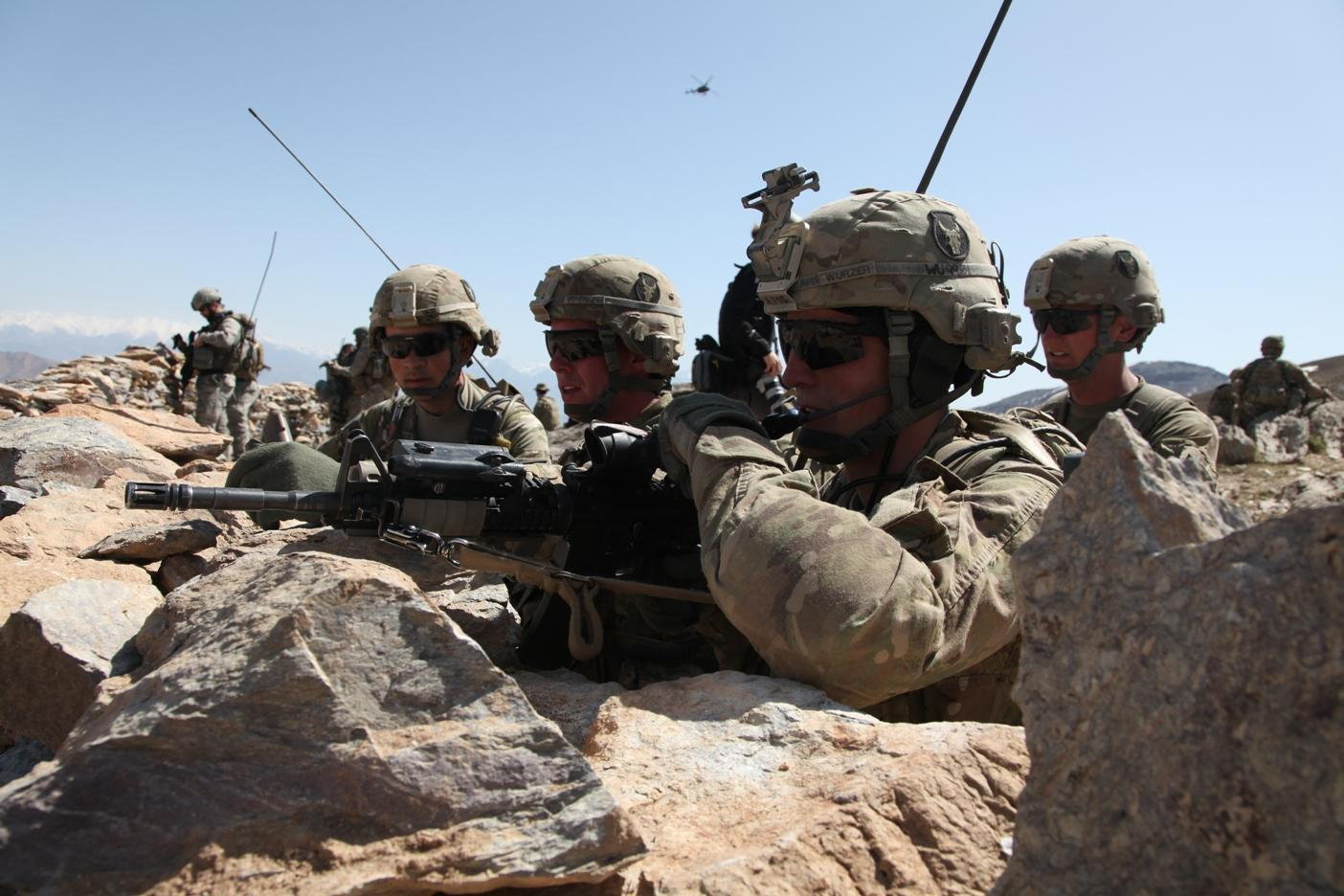
Soldiers from 34th Infantry Division, Task Force Red Bulls, discuss plans to maneuver into Pacha Khak village, Kabul Province, while conducting a dismounted patrol, 7 April 2011

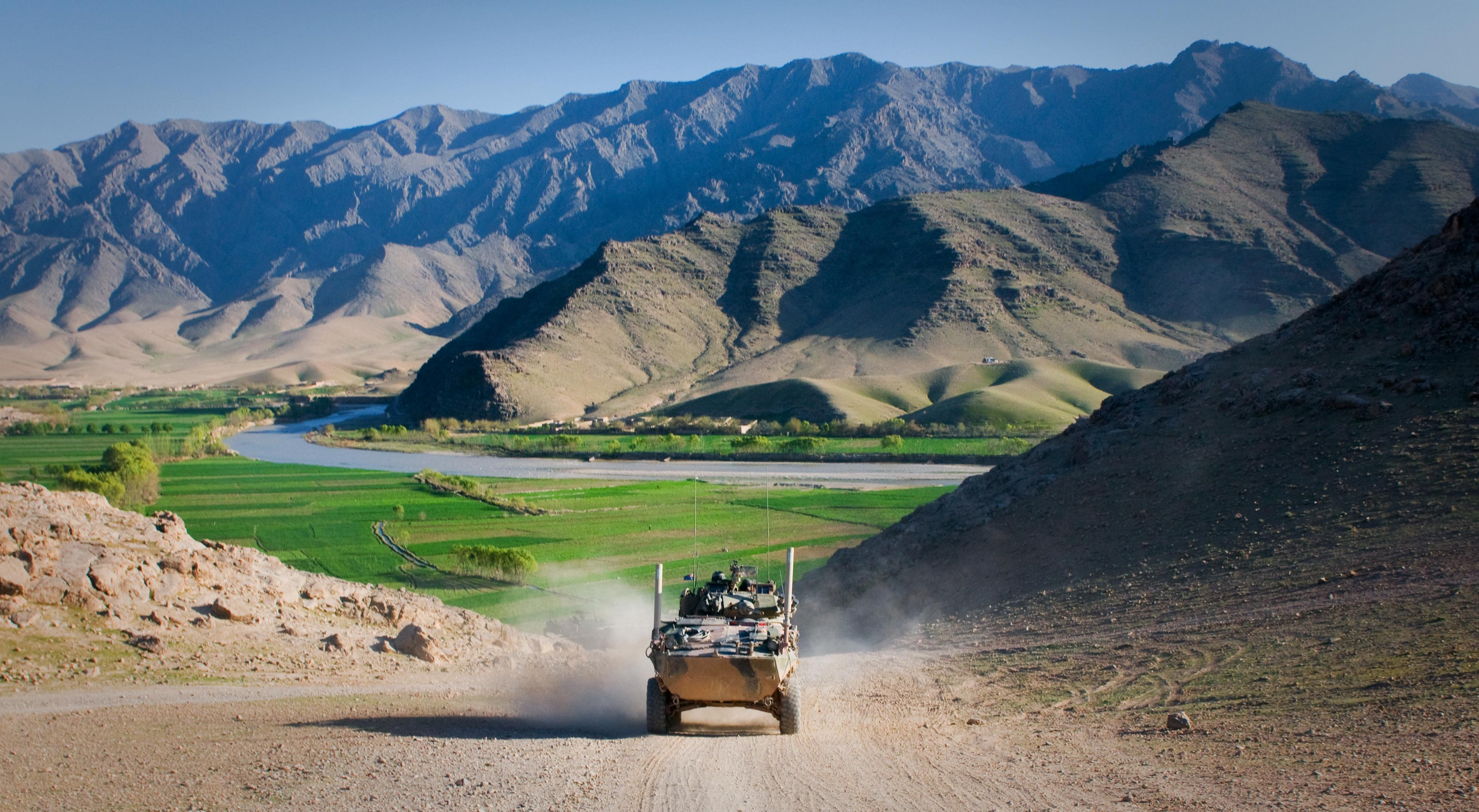
An Australian service light armored vehicle drives through Tangi Valley, 29 March 2011

=== Battle of Kandahar ===
The Battle of Kandahar was part of an offensive named after the Battle of Bad'r that took place on 13 March 624, between Medina and Mecca. The Battle followed a 30 April announcement that the Taliban would launch their Spring offensive.

On 7 May the Taliban launched a major offensive on government buildings in Kandahar. The Taliban said their goal was to take control of the city. At least eight locations were attacked: the governor's compound, the mayor's office, the NDS headquarters, three police stations and two high schools. The battle continued onto a second day. The BBC's Bilal Sarwary called it "the worst attack in Kandahar province since the fall of the Taliban government in 2001, and a embarrassment for the Western-backed Afghan government."

=== Death of Osama bin Laden ===
On 2 May US officials announced that al-Qaeda leader Osama bin Laden had been killed in Operation Neptune Spear, conducted by the US Navy SEALs, in Pakistan.

=== Withdrawal ===
On 22 June President Obama announced that 10,000 troops would be withdrawn by the end of 2011 and an additional 23,000 troops would return by the summer of 2012. After the withdrawal of 10,000 US troops, only 80,000 remained. In July 2011 Canada withdrew its combat troops, transitioning to a training role.

Following suit, other NATO countries announced troop reductions. The United Kingdom stated that it would gradually withdraw its troops, however it did not specify numbers or dates. France announced that it would withdraw roughly 1,000 soldiers by the end of 2012, with 3,000 soldiers remaining. Hundreds would come back at the end of 2011 and in the beginning of 2012, when the Afghan National Army took control of Surobi district. The remaining troops would continue to operate in Kapisa. Their complete withdrawal was expected by the end of 2014 or earlier given adequate security.

Belgium announced that half of their force would withdraw starting in January 2012. Norway announced it had started a withdrawal of its near 500 troops and would be completely out by 2014. Equally, the Spanish Prime Minister announced the withdrawal of troops beginning in 2012, including up to 40 percent by the end of the first half of 2013, and complete withdrawal by 2014.

=== 2011 US–NATO attack in Pakistan ===
After Neptune Spear, ISAF forces "accidentally" attacked Pakistan's armed forces on 26 November, killing 24 Pakistani soldiers. Pakistan blocked NATO supply lines and ordered Americans to leave Shamsi Airfield. NATO Secretary General Anders Fogh Rasmussen said the attack was 'tragic' and 'unintended'. "This (regret) is not good enough. We strongly condemn the attacks and reserve the right to take action", said DG ISPR Major General Athar Abbas. "This could have serious consequences in the level and extent of our cooperation."

== 2012: Strategic agreement ==
Taliban attacks continued at the same rate as they did in 2011, around 28,000 attacks. In September 2012, the surge of American personnel that began in late 2009 ended.

=== Reformation of the United Front (Northern Alliance) ===
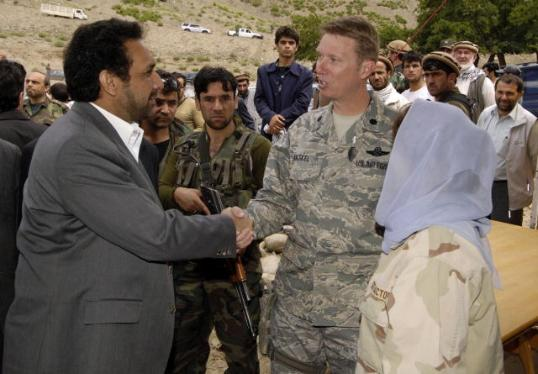
Ahmad Zia Massoud (left), former vice-president of Afghanistan, shaking hands with a US Provincial Reconstruction Team at the ceremony for a new road

In late 2011 the National Front of Afghanistan (NFA) was created by Ahmad Zia Massoud, Abdul Rashid Dostum and Haji Mohammad Mohaqiq in what many analysts have described as a reformation of the military wing of the United Front (Northern Alliance) to oppose a return of the Taliban to power. Meanwhile, much of the political wing reunited under the National Coalition of Afghanistan led by Abdullah Abdullah becoming the main democratic opposition movement in the Afghan parliament. Former head of intelligence Amrullah Saleh has created a new movement, Basej-i Milli (Afghanistan Green Trend), with support among the youth mobilizing about 10,000 people in an anti-Taliban demonstration in Kabul in May 2011.

In January 2012, the National Front of Afghanistan raised concerns about the possibility of a secret deal between the US, Pakistan and the Taliban during a widely publicized meeting in Berlin. US Congressman Louie Gohmert wrote, "These leaders who fought with embedded Special Forces to initially defeat the Taliban represent over 60-percent of the Afghan people, yet are being entirely disregarded by the Obama and Karzai Administrations in negotiations." After the meeting with US congressmen in Berlin the National Front signed a joint declaration stating among other things:

We firmly believe that any negotiation with the Taliban can only be acceptable, and therefore effective, if all parties to the conflict are involved in the process. The present form of discussions with the Taliban is flawed, as it excludes anti-Taliban Afghans. It must be recalled that the Taliban extremists and their Al-Qaeda supporters were defeated by Afghans resisting extremism with minimal human embedded support from the United States and International community. The present negotiations with the Taliban fail to take into account the risks, sacrifices and legitimate interests of the Afghans who ended the brutal oppression of all Afghans.

— National Front Berlin Statement, January 2012

=== High-profile US military incidents ===
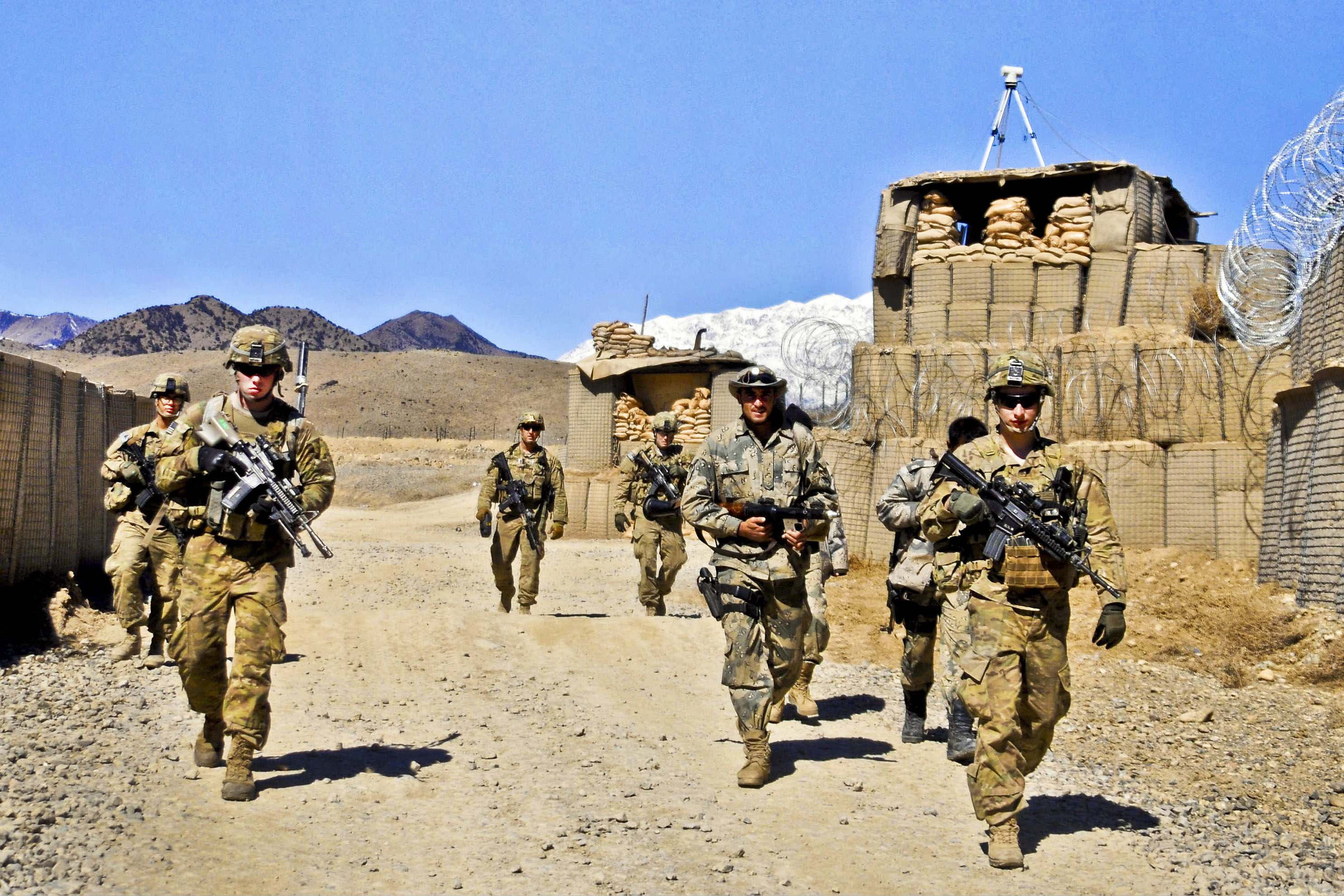
US Army soldiers prepare to conduct security checks near the Pakistan border, February 2012

Beginning in January 2012, incidents involving US troops occurred that were described by The Sydney Morning Herald as "a series of damaging incidents and disclosures involving US troops in Afghanistan." These incidents created fractures in the partnership between Afghanistan and ISAF, raised the question whether discipline within US troops was breaking down, undermined "the image of foreign forces in a country where there is already deep resentment owing to civilian deaths and a perception among many Afghans that US troops lack respect for Afghan culture and people" and strained the relations between Afghanistan and the United States. Besides an incident involving US troops who posed with body parts of dead insurgents and a video apparently showing a US helicopter crew singing "bye-bye Miss American Pie" before blasting a group of Afghan men with a Hellfire missile these "high-profile US military incidents in Afghanistan" also included the 2012 Afghanistan Quran burning protests and the Panjwai shooting spree.

=== Enduring Strategic Partnership Agreement ===
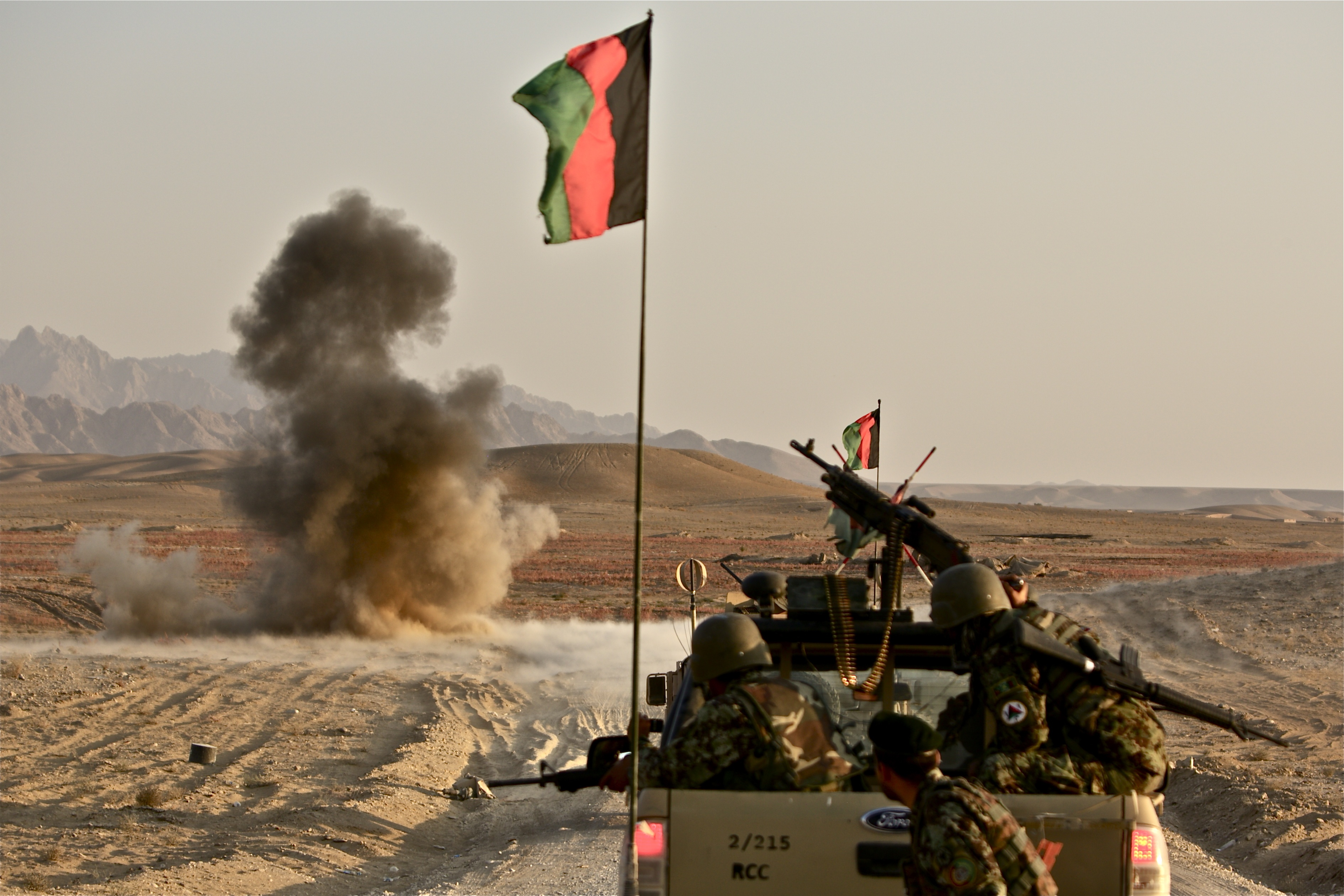
Afghan Army units neutralizes an IED in Sangin, Helmand province

On 2 May 2012, Presidents Karzai and Obama signed a strategic partnership agreement between the two countries, after the US president had arrived unannounced in Kabul on the first anniversary of Osama bin Laden's death. The US–Afghanistan Strategic Partnership Agreement, officially entitled the "Enduring Strategic Partnership Agreement between the Islamic Republic of Afghanistan and the United States of America", provides the long-term framework for the two countries' relationship after the drawdown of US forces. The Strategic Partnership Agreement went into effect on 4 July 2012, according to Secretary of State Hillary Clinton on 8 July 2012 at the Tokyo Conference on Afghanistan. On 7 July 2012, as part of the agreement, the US designated Afghanistan a major non-NATO ally after Karzai and Clinton met in Kabul. On 11 November 2012, as part of the agreement, the two countries launched negotiations for a bilateral security agreement.

=== NATO Chicago Summit: Troops withdrawal and long-term presence ===
On 21 May 2012 the leaders of NATO-member countries endorsed an exit strategy during the NATO Summit. ISAF Forces would transfer command of all combat missions to Afghan forces by the middle of 2013, while shifting from combat to advising, training and assisting Afghan security forces. Most of the 130,000 ISAF troops would depart by the end of December 2014. A new NATO mission would then assume the support role.

== 2013: Withdrawal ==
=== Karzai–Obama meeting ===
Karzai visited the US in January 2012. At the time the US Government stated its openness to withdrawing all of its troops by the end of 2014. On 11 January 2012 Karzai and Obama agreed to transfer combat operations from NATO to Afghan forces by spring 2013 rather than summer 2013. "What's going to happen this spring is that Afghans will be in the lead throughout the country", Obama said. "They [ISAF forces] will still be fighting alongside Afghan troops ... we will be in a training, assisting, advising role." He also stated the reason of the withdrawals that "We achieved our central goal, or have come very close ... which is to de-capacitate al-Qaeda, to dismantle them, to make sure that they can't attack us again."

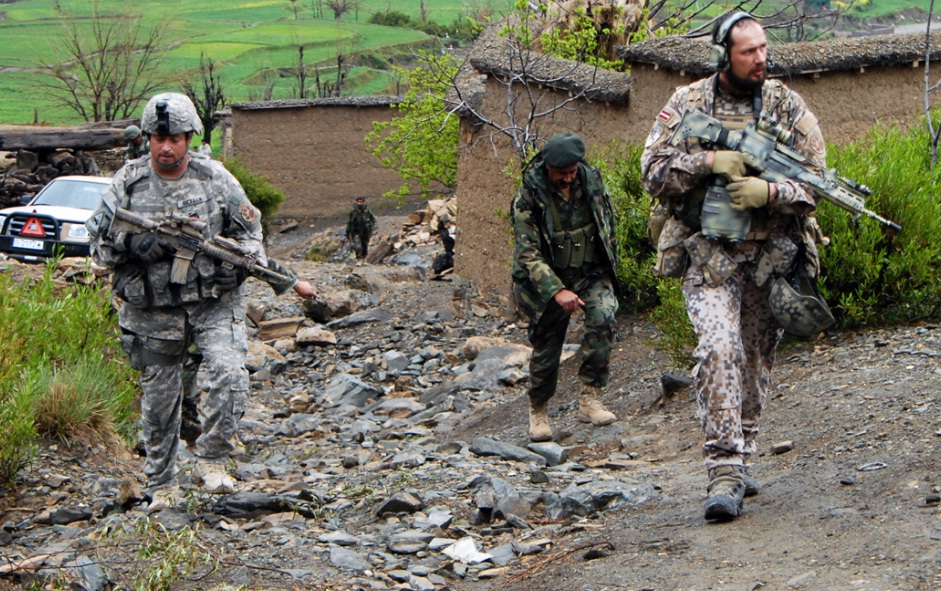
Soldiers from the Michigan Army National Guard and the Latvian Army patrol through a village in Konar province.

Obama also stated that he would determine the pace of troop withdrawal after consultations with commanders. He added that any US mission beyond 2014 would focus solely on counterterrorism operations and training. Obama insisted that a continuing presence must include an immunity agreement in which US troops are not subjected to Afghan law. "I can go to the Afghan people and argue for immunity for US troops in Afghanistan in a way that Afghan sovereignty will not be compromised, in a way that Afghan law will not be compromised", Karzai replied.

Both leaders agreed that the United States would transfer Afghan prisoners and prisons to the Afghan government and withdraw troops from Afghan villages in spring 2013. "The international forces, the American forces, will be no longer present in the villages, that it will be the task of the Afghan forces to provide for the Afghan people in security and protection", the Afghan president said.

=== Security transfer ===
On 18 June 2013 the transfer of security responsibilities was completed. The last step was to transfer control of 95 remaining districts. Karzai said, "When people see security has been transferred to Afghans, they support the army and police more than before." NATO leader Rasmussen said that Afghan forces were completing a five-stage transition process that began in March 2011. "They are doing so with remarkable resolve", he said. "Ten years ago, there were no Afghan national security forces ... now you have 350,000 Afghan troops and police." ISAF remained slated to end its mission by the end of 2014. Some 100,000 ISAF forces remained in the country.

== 2014: Withdrawal continues and the insurgency increases ==
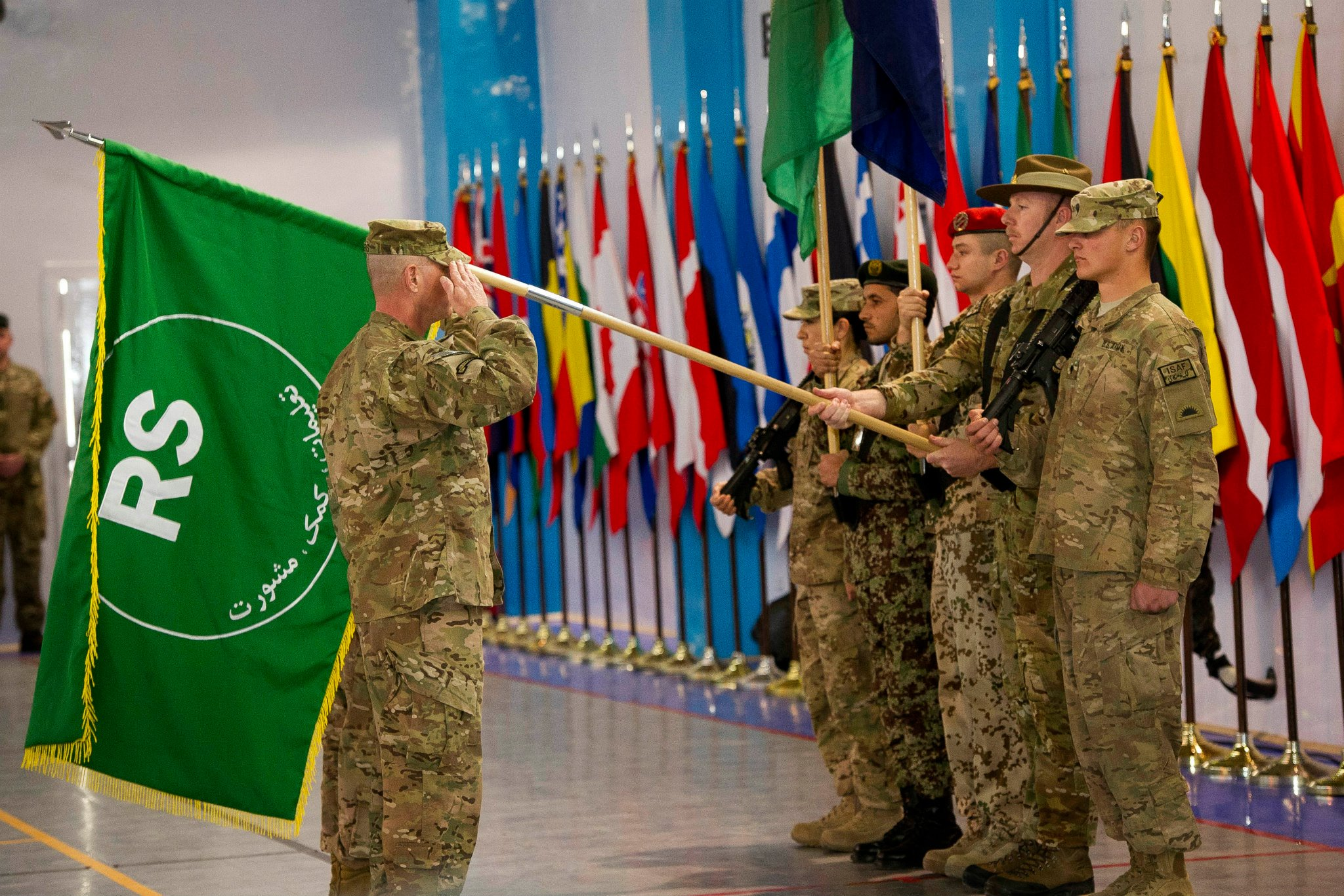
Resolute Support Colors presented at Kabul on 28 December, after the ISAF colors are encased

After 2013, the Taliban escalated suicide bombings. An example of this is a bombing of a Lebanese restaurant in the Wazir Akbar Khan area of Kabul on 18 February 2014. Among the dead in this attack were UN staff and the owner of a restaurant, who died protecting his business; 21 people altogether were killed. Meanwhile, the withdrawal continued, with 200 more US troops going home. The UK halved their force and were slowing withdrawal with all but two bases being closed down. On 20 March 2014, more than four weeks after a bomb in a military bus by the Taliban rocked the city once again, a raid on the Serena Hotel's restaurant in Kabul by the Taliban resulted in the deaths of nine people, including the four perpetrators. The attack came just nine days after Swedish radio journalist Nils Horner was shot dead by the Taliban.

However, as the US troops withdrew from Afghanistan, they were replaced by private security companies hired by the United States government and the United Nations. Many of these private security companies (also termed military contractors) consisted of ex US Army, US Marine, British, French and Italian defense personnel who had left the defense after a few years of active service. Their past relations with the defense helped establish their credentials, simultaneously allowing the US and British to continue to be involved in ground actions without the requirement to station their own forces. This included companies such as the Ohio-based military contracting company, Mission Essential Personnel set up by Sunil Ramchand, a former White House staffer and US Navy veteran.

Despite the crisis in Crimea, by March 2014 Russia had not tried to exert pressure on the US via the Northern Distribution Network supply line. On 9 June 2014 a coalition air strike mistakenly killed five US troops, an Afghan National Army member and an interpreter in Zabul Province.

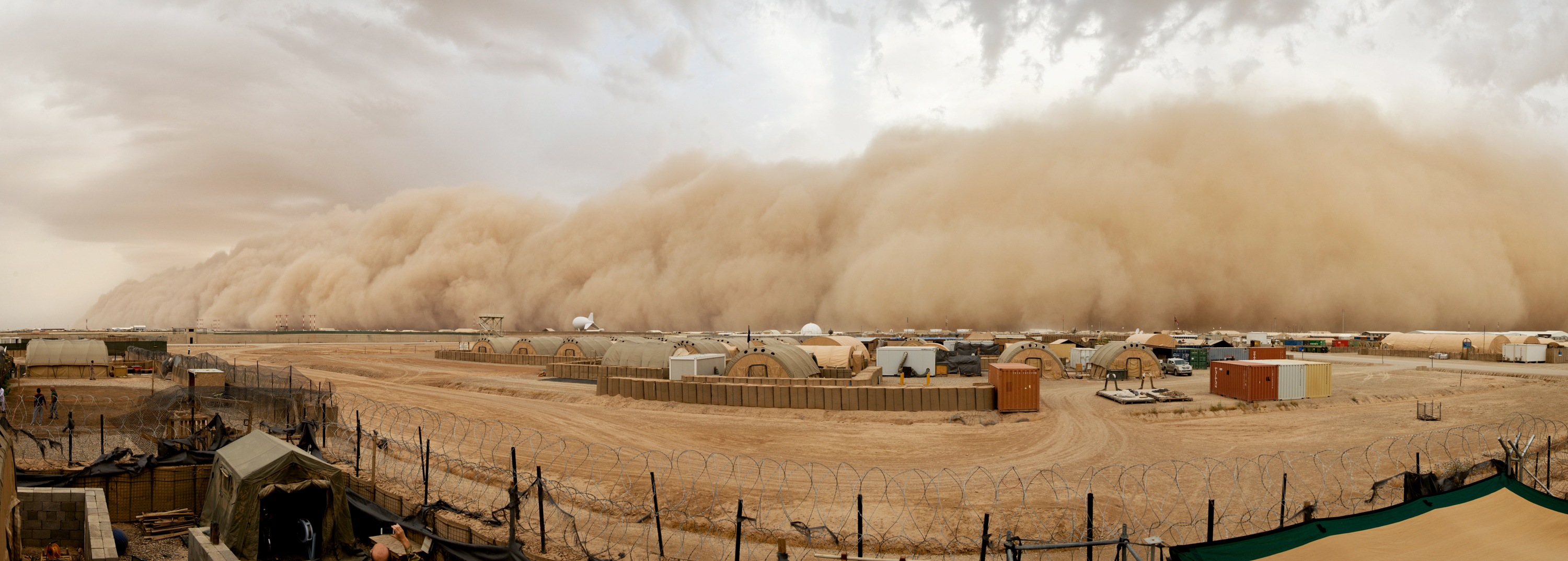
A dust storm enveloping Camp Bastion in May 2014

On 5 August 2014, a gunman in an Afghan military uniform opened fire on a number of US, foreign and Afghan soldiers, killing a US general, Harold J. Greene and wounding about 15 officers and soldiers including a German brigadier general and a large number of US soldiers at Camp Qargha, a training base west of Kabul.

Two longterm security pacts, the Bilaterial Security agreement between Afghanistan and the United States of America and the NATO Status of Forces Agreement between NATO and Afghanistan, were signed on 30 September 2014. Both pacts lay out the framework for the foreign troop involvement in Afghanistan after the year 2014.

After 13 years Britain and the United States officially ended their combat operation in Afghanistan on 26 October 2014. On that day Britain handed over its last base in Afghanistan, Camp Bastion, while the United States handed over its last base, Camp Leatherneck, to Afghan forces.

As early as November 2012, the US and NATO were considering the precise configuration of their post-2014 presence in Afghanistan. On 27 May 2014, President Barack Obama announced that US combat operations in Afghanistan would end in December 2014 (see Withdrawal of United States troops from Afghanistan (2011–2016)). 9,800 troops were to remain, training Afghan security forces and supporting counterterrorism operations against remnants of al-Qaeda. This force would be halved by the end of 2015, and consolidated at Bagram Air Base and in Kabul. All US forces, with the exception of a "normal embassy presence", would be removed from Afghanistan by the end of 2016. In 2014, 56 United States service members, and 101 contractors, died in Afghanistan.

On 28 December 2014 NATO officially ended combat operations in a ceremony held in Kabul. Continued operations by United States forces within Afghanistan continued under the name Operation Freedom's Sentinel; this was joined by a new NATO mission under the name of Operation Resolute Support. Operation Resolute Support involved 28 NATO nations, 14 partner nations, 11,000 American troops, and 850 German troops. The Special Operations Joint Task Force – Afghanistan, the remnant US/NATO special forces organization, includes a counter-terrorism task force. According to the US Special Operations Command Factbook for 2015, this task force "[c]onducts offensive operations in Afghanistan to degrade the Taliban, al-Qaeda, and the Haqqani Networks in order to prevent them from establishing operationally significant safe havens which threaten the stability and sovereignty of Government of the Islamic Republic of Afghanistan and the United States." This task force is similar to previous forces such as Task Force 373.

The UK officially commemorated the end of its role in the Afghan war in a ceremony held in St Paul's Cathedral on 13 March 2015. Around 500 UK troops remain in "non-combat" roles.

== 2015 Taliban resurgence ==
The Taliban began a resurgence due to several factors. At the end of 2014, the US and NATO combat mission ended and the withdrawal of most foreign forces from Afghanistan reduced the risk the Taliban faced of being bombed and raided. In June 2014, the Pakistani military's Operation Zarb-e-Azb, launched in the North Waziristan tribal area in June 2014, dislodged thousands of mainly Uzbek, Arab and Pakistani militants, who flooded into Afghanistan and swelled the Taliban's ranks. The group was further emboldened by the comparative lack of interest from the international community and the diversion of its attention to crisis in other parts of the world, such as Syria, Iraq, Yemen, Ukraine, Libya, Nigeria, and Somalia. Afghan security forces also lack certain capabilities and equipment, especially air power and reconnaissance. The political infighting in the central government in Kabul and the apparent weakness in governance at different levels are also exploited by the Taliban. In May 2015, Russia has closed a key military transport corridor which allowed NATO to deliver military supplies to Afghanistan through the Russian territory.

On 5 January, a suicide car bomber attacked the HQ of EUPOL Afghanistan in Kabul, killing 1 person and injuring 5. The Taliban claimed responsibility. On 15 January, Afghan security officials arrested five men in Kabul in relation to their suspected involvement in the 2014 Peshawar school massacre in Pakistan. In mid-January 2015, the Islamic State of Iraq and the Levant established a branch in Afghanistan called Wilayah Khorasan and began recruiting fighters and clashing with the Taliban. However, an Afghan military officer stated that he believed the Afghan military could handle any threat that the group presented in the country.

In January 2015, United States Forces began conducting drone strikes in Afghanistan under the direction of the administration of the United States President Barack Obama against Taliban militants, Pakistani Taliban (TTP) militants, ISIL branch in Afghanistan militants and Al-Qaeda militants.

American forces have increased raids against "Islamist militants", moving beyond counter-terrorism missions. This is partially due to improved relations with the United States due to the Ghani presidency. Reasoning used for these raids include protecting American forces, which has been broadly interpreted. One raid, a joint raid by American and Afghan forces arrested six Taliban connected to the 2014 Peshawar school massacre. American Secretary of Defense Ash Carter traveled to Afghanistan in February 2015; during a period when it was discussed that the US would slow down its withdrawal from Afghanistan.

In February 2015, the headquarters element of the US 7th Infantry Division began to deploy to Afghanistan. It served as the Resolute Support Mission's Train Advise Assist Command - South headquarters. It was joined by 10th Mountain Division's 2nd Brigade Combat Team, and 101st Combat Aviation Brigade.

On 18 March, Hafiz Wahidi, ISIL's replacement deputy Emir in Afghanistan, was killed by the Afghan Armed Forces, along with 9 other ISIL militants accompanying him.

On 19 March, it was reported by Reuters that the US military bases in Kandahar and Jalalabad were likely to remain open beyond the end of 2015, a senior US official said, as the Federal government of the United States considered slowing its military withdrawal to help the new government fight the Taliban. The anticipated policy reversal reflected US support of Afghanistan's new and more cooperative president, Ashraf Ghani, and a desire to avoid the collapse of local security forces that occurred in Iraq after the US withdrawal there.

On 25 March, the Afghan National Army killed 29 insurgents and injured 21 others in a series of operations in the Daikundi, Ghazni, and Parwan provinces. Eleven people, including one US service member, died in a Taliban attack on Camp Integrity in Kabul in August.

Suicide bombers attacked Hetal Hotel in May. Norwegian Marinejegerkommandoen special forces were central in saving 37 Australian hostages while maintaining direct contact with the Australian ambassador in Kabul.

Throughout 2015, the US launched about one thousand bombs and missiles at targets in Afghanistan, according to the Council on Foreign Relations.

=== Kabul Parliament attack ===
On 22 June 2015, the Taliban detonated a car bomb outside the National Assembly in Kabul, and Taliban fighters attacked the building with assault rifles and RPGs. A Taliban fighter driving a car loaded with explosives managed to get through security checkpoints before detonating the vehicle outside the parliament's gates. Six Taliban insurgents with AK-47 rifles and RPGs took up positions in a construction site nearby. Members of Parliament were evacuated to safety, while security forces engaged the insurgents in a two-hour gun battle. Afghan Interior Ministry spokesman Sediq Sediqqi said all seven attackers were killed by police and no MPs were wounded. The UN mission in Afghanistan said a woman and a child were killed in the attack and 40 civilians were injured.

=== Kunduz Offensive ===
Heavy fighting has occurred in the Kunduz province, which was the site of clashes from 2009 onwards. In May 2015, flights into the Northern city of Kunduz were suspended due to weeks of clashes between the Afghan security forces and the Taliban outside the city. The intensifying conflict in the Northern Char Dara District within the Kunduz province led the Afghan government to enlist local militia fighters to bolster opposition to the Taliban insurgency. In June, the Taliban intensified attacks around the Northern city of Kunduz as part of a major offensive in an attempt to capture the city. Tens of thousands of inhabitants have been displaced internally in Afghanistan by the fighting. The government recaptured the Char Dara district after roughly a month of fighting.

In late September, Taliban forces launched an attack on Kunduz, seizing several outlying villages and entering the city. The Taliban stormed the regional hospital and clashed with security forces at the nearby university. The fighting saw the Taliban attack from four different districts: Char Dara to the West, Aliabad to the Southwest, Khanabad to the East and Imam Saheb to the North. The Taliban took the Zakhel and Ali Khel villages on the highway leading south, which connects the city to Kabul and Mazar-e Sharif through Aliabad district, and reportedly made their largest gains in the Southwest of Kunduz, where some local communities had picked up weapons and supported the Taliban. Taliban fighters had allegedly blocked the route to the Airport to prevent civilians fleeing the city. One witness reported that the headquarters of the National Directorate of Security was set on fire. Kunduz was recaptured by Afghan and American forces on 14 October 2015.

== Taliban negotiations, 2015–2016 ==
Chinese officials have declared that Afghan stability affects separatist movements in the region, including in China's West as well as the security of the China–Pakistan Economic Corridor. China and Pakistan have been involved in negotiations between the Afghan government and the Taliban. The Quadrilateral Coordination Group-consisting of Afghan, American, Chinese and Pakistani officials have been inviting the Taliban to discuss peace talks since January 2016, but currently they are presumably preoccupied with fighting each other and the government forces. A meeting between representatives of both sides were expected to take place in early March but the Taliban stated they would not participate.

The bombing of the Kabul parliament has highlighted differences within the Taliban in their approach to peace talks. In April 2016, President Ashraf Ghani "pulled the plug" on the Afghan governments failing effort to start peace talks with the Taliban. Additionally, due to the integration of Haqqani Networks into the Taliban leadership, it would become harder for peace talks to take place. Although leader of the Taliban, Haibatullah Akhundzada, said a peace agreement was possible if the government in Kabul renounced its foreign allies.

== Taliban infighting, 2015–2016 ==
On 11 November 2015, it was reported that infighting had broken out between different Taliban factions in Zabul Province. Fighters loyal to the new Taliban leader Mullah Akhtar Mansoor fought a Pro-ISIL splinter faction led by Mullah Mansoor Dadullah. Even though Dadullah's faction enjoyed the support of foreign ISIL fighters, including Uzbeks and Chechens, it was reported that Mansoor's Taliban loyalists had the upper hand. According to Ghulam Jilani Farahi, provincial director of security in Zabul, more than 100 militants from both sides were killed since the fighting broke out.

The infighting has continued into 2016; on 10 March 2016, officials said that the Taliban clashed with the Taliban splinter group (led by Muhammad Rasul) in the Shindand district of Herat with up to 100 militants killed; the infighting has also stifled peace talks.

As a result of the infighting, which has resulted in Mansour being consumed with a campaign to quell dissent against his leadership; Sirajuddin Haqqani, chief of the Haqqani Network was selected to become the deputy leader of the Taliban in the summer of 2015, during a leadership struggle within the Taliban. Sirajuddin and other Haqqani leaders increasingly run the day-to-day military operations for the Taliban, in particular; refining urban terrorist attacks and cultivating a sophisticated international fund-raising network, they also appointed Taliban governors and began uniting the Taliban. As a result, the Haqqani Network is now closely integrated with the Taliban at a leadership level, and is growing in influence within the insurgency, whereas the network was largely autonomous before, and there are concerns that the fighting is going to be deadlier. Tensions with the Pakistani military have also been raised because American and Afghan officials accuse them of sheltering the Haqqanis as a proxy group.

== Taliban offensive in Helmand Province, 2015–2018 ==
In 2015 the Taliban began an offensive in Helmand Province, taking over parts of the Province. By June 2015, they had seized control of Dishu and Baghran killing 5,588 Afghan government security forces (3,720 of them were police officers). By the end of July, the Taliban had overrun Nawzad District and on 26 August, the Taliban took control of Musa Qala. the status of the remaining districts, by 18 December 2015, is that Taliban and Afghan security forces are contesting Nahr-i-Sarraj, Sangin, Kajaki, Nad Ali and Khanashin (Afghan security forces claim to have previously "ejected" the Taliban from the Khanashin district center, with 42 Taliban fighters killed) whilst Garmsir, Washir, and Nawa-i-Barak are believed to be contested.

In October 2015, Taliban forces had attempted to take Lashkar Gah; the capital of Helmand province, the Afghan's 215th Corps and special operations forces launched a counteroffensive against the Taliban in November, Whilst the assault was repelled, Taliban forces remained dug into the city's suburbs as of December 2015. December 2015 saw a renewed Taliban offensive in Helmand focused on the town of Sangin. The Sangin district fell to the Taliban on 21 December after fierce clashes that killed more than 90 soldiers in two days. It was reported that 30 members of the SAS alongside 60 US special forces operators joined the Afghan Army in the Battle to retake parts of Sangin from Taliban insurgents, in addition, about 300 US troops and a small number of British remained in Helmand to advise Afghan commanders at the corps level.

On or around 23 December, approximately 200 Afghan Police and Army forces were besieged inside the town's police headquarters, with ammunition, military equipment and food having to be airdropped to their positions, with the rest of Sangin being under Taliban control, and an attempted relief mission failing. As of 27 December 2015, the Taliban control the districts of Musa Qala, Nawzad, Baghran, and Disho and districts of Sangin, Marja, Khanishin, Nad Ali, and Kajaki have also experienced sustained fighting according to Mohammad Karim Attal, the chief of the Helmand Provincial council.

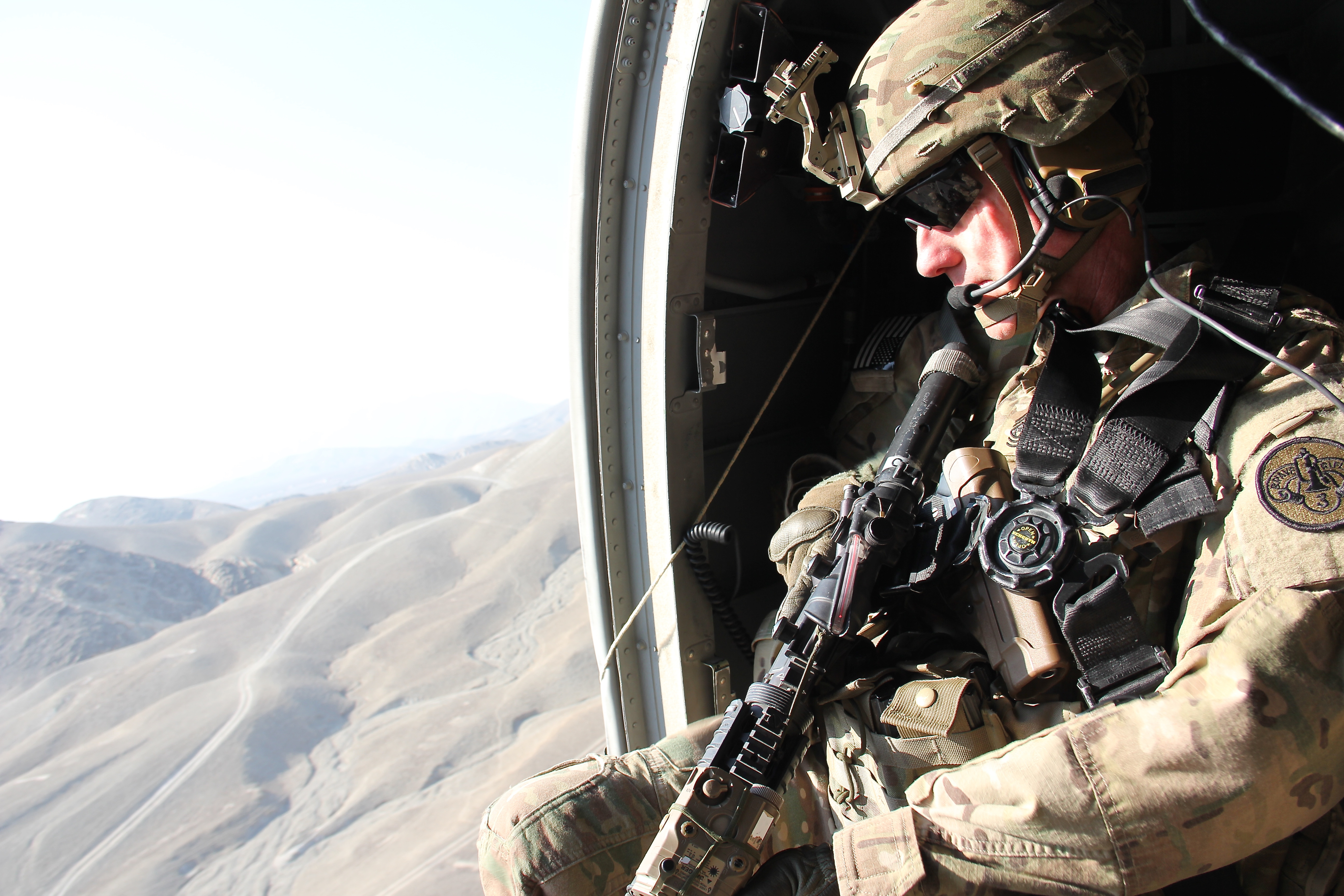
US Army soldier in Nangarhar Province, 6 January 2015

Senior American commanders said that the Afghan troops in the province have lacked effective leaders as well as the necessary weapons and ammunition to hold off persistent Taliban attacks. Some Afghan soldiers in Helmand have been fighting in tough conditions for years without a break to see their family, leading to poor morale and high desertion rates. In early February 2016, Taliban insurgents renewed their assault on Sangin, after previously being repulsed in December 2015, launching a string of ferocious attacks on Afghan government forces earlier in the month. As a result, the United States decided to send troops from the 2nd Battalion, 87th Infantry Regiment, 10th Mountain Division, in order to prop up the Afghan 215th Corps in Helmand province, particularly around Sangin, joining US special operations forces already in the area.

On 23 February 2016, CNN announced that Afghan troops pulled out of Nawzad and Musa Qala districts in Helmand Province on 20 and 21 February in what a senior military official said was a "tactical" move. Head of the local provincial council Mohammad Karim Atal told CNN, "Afghan soldiers had paid a heavy price and had recaptured some of the areas in those districts by shedding their blood only few months back, but now because of mismanagement, lack of coordination and weak leadership they left them in the hands of enemies."

On 14 March 2016, Khanneshin District in Helmand Province fell to the Taliban; and district by district, Afghan troops were retreating back to urban centers in Helmand. In early April 2016, 600 Afghan troops launched a major offensive to retake Taliban-occupied areas of Sangin and the area around it, an Afghan army offensive to retake the town of Khanisheen was repelled by the Taliban, desertions from the army in the area are rife. By 28 July 2016, the outlook on the situation in Helmand province was good, US military officials are now expecting a major Taliban offensive. General John Nicholson said, "now, fighting season's not over. We anticipate we'll see other enemy attempts to regain territory in Helmand. But thus far, things are on a real positive trajectory."

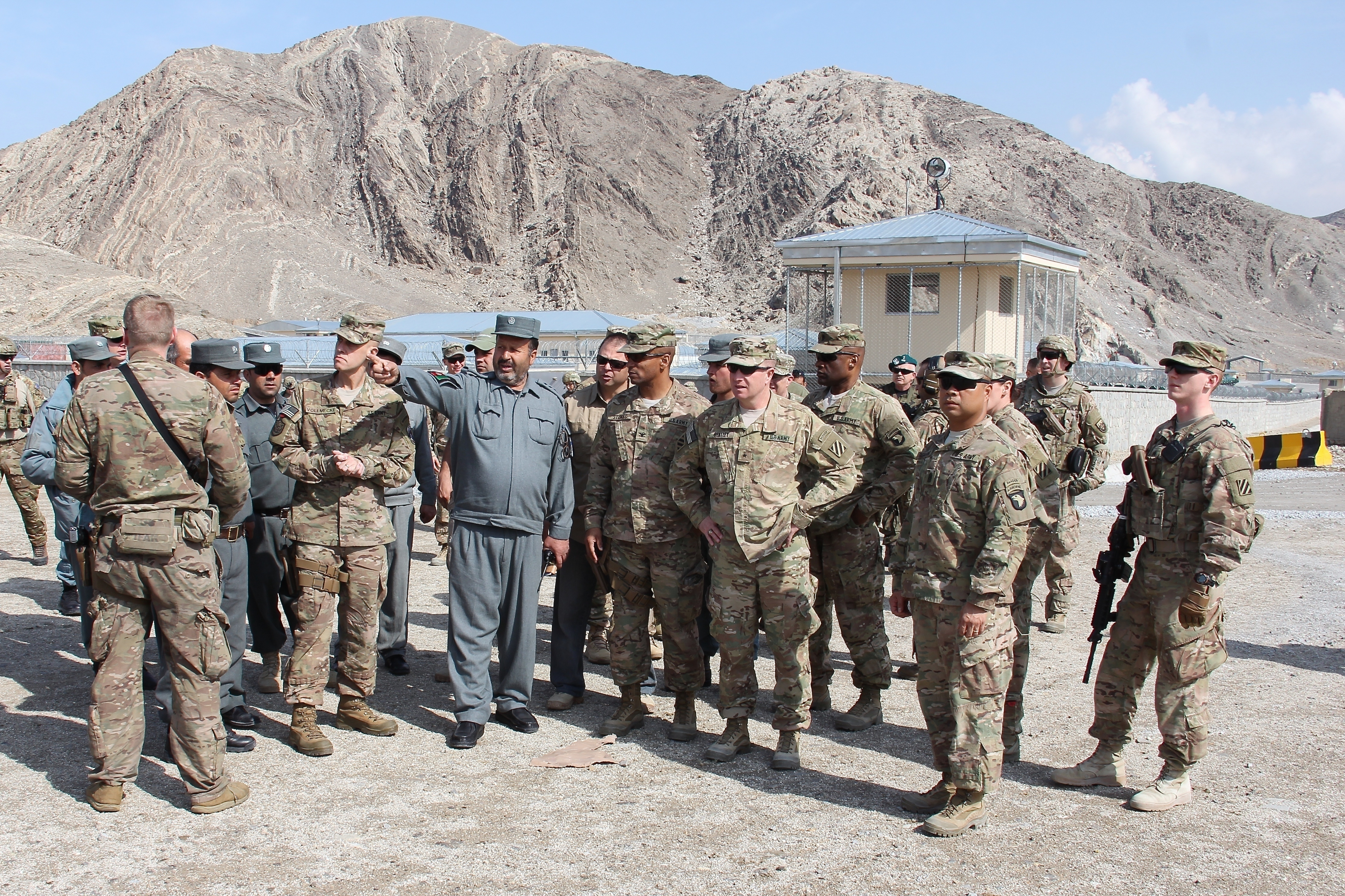
TAAC-E advisers in February 2015

Despite US airstrikes, militants besieged Lashkar Gah, reportedly controlling all roads leading to the city and areas a few kilometres away. The US stepped up airstrikes in support of Afghan ground forces. Afghan forces in Lashkar Gah were reported as "exhausted" whilst police checkpoints around the capital were falling one by one; whilst the Taliban sent a new elite commando force into Helmand called "Sara Khitta" in Pashto. Afghan security forces beat back attacks by Taliban fighters encroaching on Chah-e-Anjir, just 10 km from Lashkar Gah; Afghan special forces backed by US airstrikes battled increasingly well-armed and disciplined Taliban militants. An Afghan special forces commander said "The Taliban have heavily armed, uniformed units that are equipped with night vision and modern weapons." On 22 August 2016, the US announced that 100 US troops were sent to Lashkar Gah to help prevent the Taliban from overrunning it, in what Brigadier General Charles Cleveland called a "temporary effort" to advise the Afghan police. The deployment brought the number of US troops deployed in and around Lashkar Gah to about 700; according to a spokesman for the provincial governor of Helmand, US forces have been carrying out operations with Afghan forces in the Chah Anjir area of Nad-e-Ali district and around the Babaji area.

On 1 October 2016, it was reported that Taliban fighters advanced closer to Lashkar Gah by pushing into a farming district on the other side of the river from the town. Despite pushing back the Taliban with the support of US airstrikes in August, the Afghan government is struggling to reverse the tide of fighting. Local officials said that security forces were engaging insurgents and were expected to begin offensive operations soon. On 10 October, it was reported that the Taliban launched a large-scale attack on Lashkar Gah, pushing into the town, and were said to have taken Bolan and Nawa.

On 31 December 2016, the Taliban continued their assault on the province with attacks on Sangin and Marjah districts. In January 2017, the Marine Corps Times reported that in spring 2017, the US Marine Corps would deploy a task force of 300 personnel (known as Task Force Southwest) for nine months to southwestern Afghanistan to advise-and-assist local security forces in countering Taliban gains in the Helmand province. Officials said the Marines would work alongside "key leaders" from the Afghan National Army's 215th Corps and the 505th Zone National Police "to further optimize their capabilities in that region." Task Force Southwest comprised mostly more-senior military personnel selected from units across II Marine Expeditionary Force, including the 6th Marine Regiment; the Task Force replaced the US Army's Task Force Forge, which has conducted a similar advisory role for much of 2016. Some estimates suggest the Taliban has retaken more than 80% of Helmand province. According to Defense Department statistics 9 US service members were killed in action and another 70 were wounded there by hostile activity throughout 2016. The Washington Post reported that the Afghan government control 2 districts whilst 6 districts are contested and the 6 others are largely controlled by the Taliban.

On 12 February 2017, the Huffington Post reported that, according to a UN report, that US aircraft conducted around 30 air strikes in Helmand Province in the preceding week; according to a U.N. statement, air strikes in Sangin district on 9 and 10 February killed as many as 18 civilians. Military.com reported that the Helmand governor's office said 60 Taliban fighters, including 8 commanders, were killed in the recent fighting but denied any civilian deaths.

During the early hours of 23 March 2017 Sangin district was captured by the Taliban as they have overrun the district center, the town of Sangin. During earlier phase of the war almost a quarter of British casualties were caused by fighting for the town, while more recently hundreds of Afghan troops lost their lives defending it. On 29 April 2017, the Donald Trump administration deployed an additional 5,000 US Marines to the Southern Helmand Province.

The Washington Post reported on 16 April 2018, that the Afghan government believe they have Lashkar Gah and Gereshk under control, and have expanded security as far south as Garmser district center and as far west as Marjah district center, but most of those two districts and many others remain under Taliban influence or control. On 1 April 2018, Afghan forces, with US air support launched an offensive in Nad-e Ali district.

== 2016 ==
In January 2016, the US government sent a directive to the Pentagon which granted new legal authority for the US military to go on the offensive against Militants affiliated with the ISIL-KP (Islamic State of Iraq and the Levant – Khorasan Province), after the State Department announced the designation of ISIS in Afghanistan and Pakistan as a foreign terrorist organization. ISIS-K formed in January 2015 after it pledged its allegiance to Abu Bakr al-Baghdadi, the number of militants started with around 60 or 70, with most of them coming over the border with Pakistan but now they range between 1,000 and 3,000 militants, mainly defectors from the Afghan and the Pakistani Taliban, and is generally confined to Nangarhar Province but also has/had a presence in Kunar province.

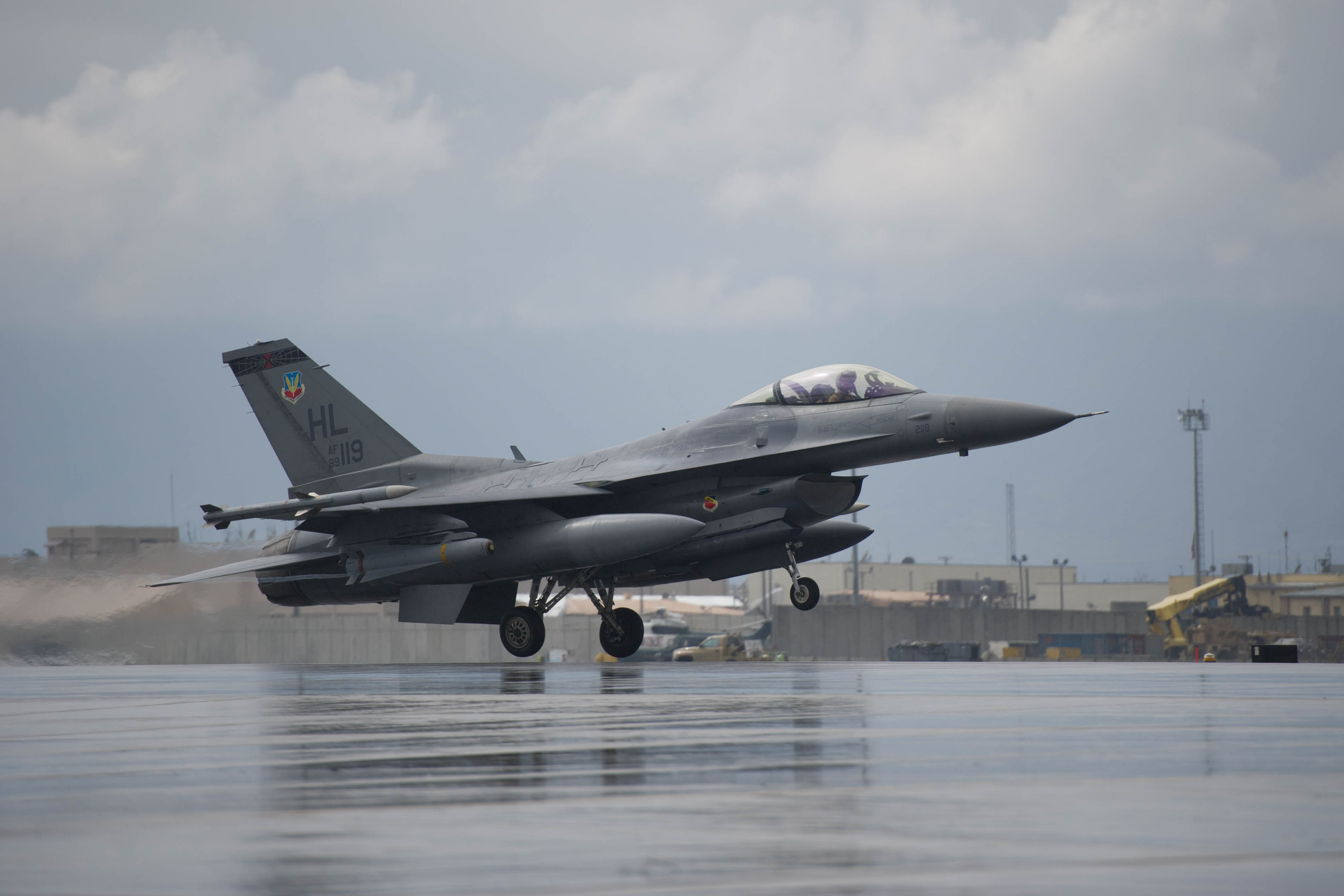
A USAF F-16 Fighting Falcon takes off at Bagram Airfield for a combat sortie, 14 March 2016

For 3 weeks in that month, the US military carried out at least a dozen operations, including commando raids and airstrikes, many of these raids and strikes taking place in the Tora Bora region of Nangarhar Province. American commanders in Afghanistan said they believed that between 90 and 100 Islamic State militants had been killed in these recent operations. By 11 February, ABC news reported the US military had carried out 20 airstrikes on ISIS in eastern Afghanistan in the previous 3 weeks. On 21 February, the Wall Street Journal reported that, just over a week before, Afghan forces supported by US airstrikes launched an operation dubbed "Eagle 18", against ISIL forces in Nangarhar province. Ground forces led by the Afghan army and backed by police and paramilitary groups pushed into Achin district, the group's main base and Dislodged Islamic State From their Stronghold, US airstrikes had hit the area almost daily for weeks, killing militants affiliated with Islamic State and weakening their grip on the district. Two Afghan soldiers were wounded in the operation but ISIL militants retreated from Achin and other districts. On 6 March 2016, Afghanistan's President Ashraf Ghani announced in the Afghan parliament that the Islamic State has been defeated in the eastern parts of the country, Afghan forces claimed victory following the 21-day operation in Achin and Shinwar districts of Nangarhar province, claiming at least 200 militants killed. The operation was aided by local civilians who set up checkpoints to help maintain security in their villages and later supplemented the Afghan forces. On 15 March 2016, an official confirmed that Islamic State militants had moved into Chahar Dara district of Kunduz province and into Kunar province.

In early April 2016, it was reported that US and Afghan forces had killed 1,979 suspected militants, 736 others wounded and 965 detained between April 2015 and March 2016, ISIS militants have also been trying to flee into Ghazni and Nuristan province, whilst a rise in defections from the group to the government and the Taliban. On 12 April 2016, the Taliban announced that they would launch an offensive called Operation Omari.

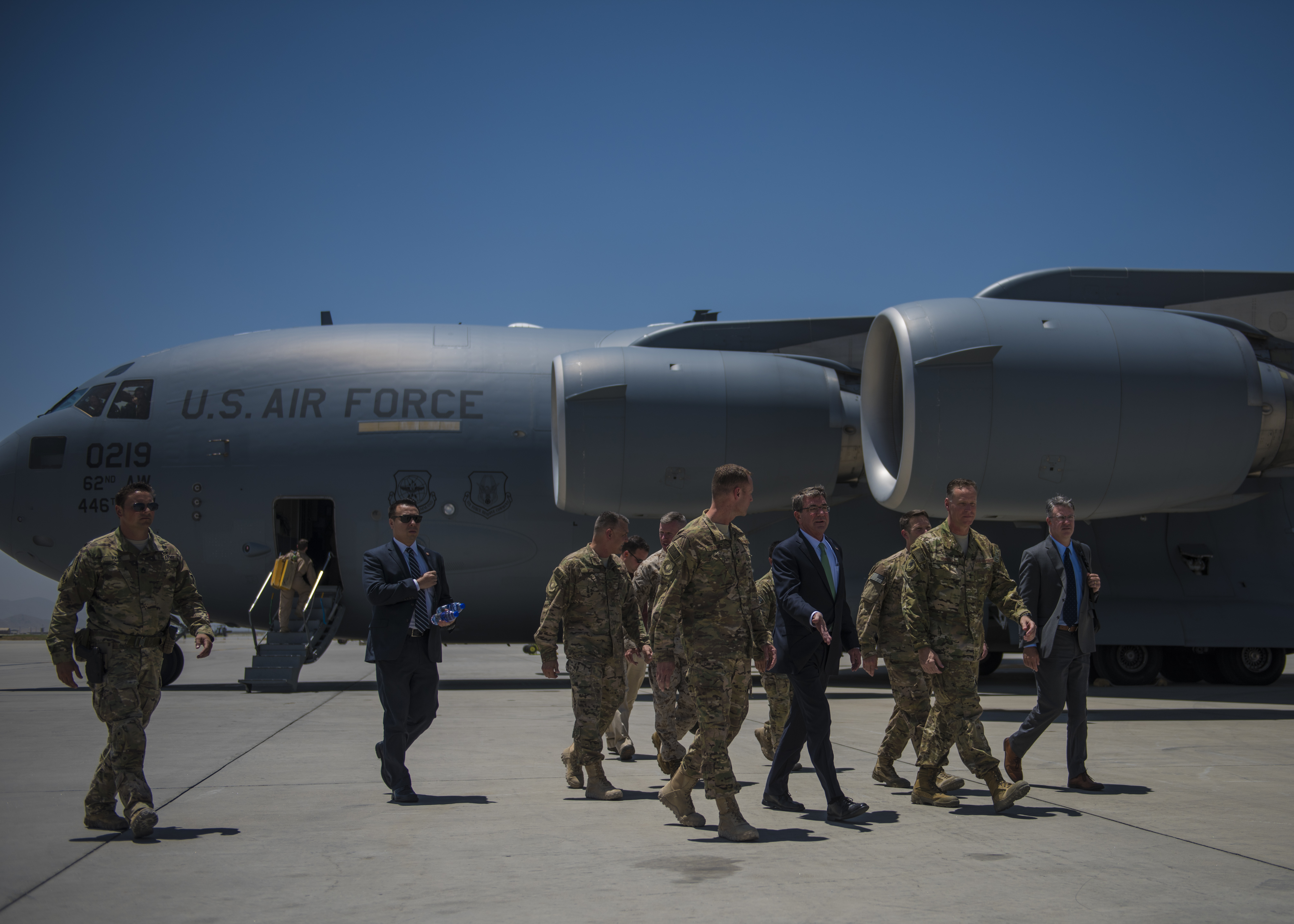
US Secretary of Defense Ash Carter speaks to troops at Bagram Airfield, 12 July 2016

In late June 2016, IS militants attacked police checkpoints in the Kot area of Nangarhar province, heavy fighting between Islamic State militants and government security forces has claimed dozens of lives in eastern Afghanistan, as many as 36 IS militants are reported to have been killed in the assaults, at least a dozen Afghan security forces and civilians have been killed, with another 18 wounded. The latest attacks indicate the group remains a potent threat to a government already battling an insurgency dominated by the rival Taliban.

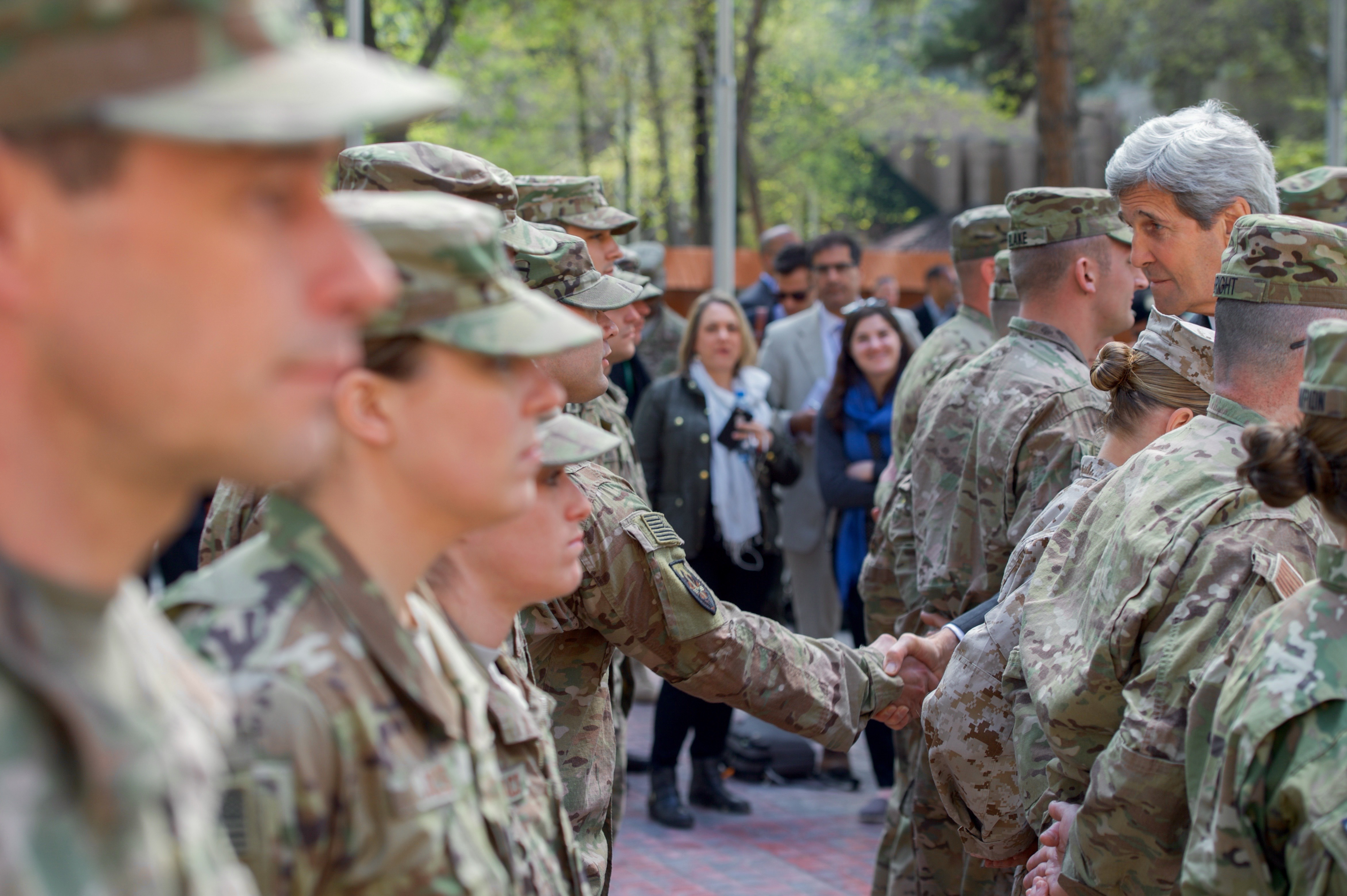
US Secretary of State John Kerry in Kabul, 9 April 2016

Afghan forces have been battling the Taliban in northeastern Kunduz as part of the Afghan forces' own spring offensive. On 14 April, hundreds of Taliban and other insurgents attempted to retake Kunduz, however Afghan forces repelled the assault, according to Kunduz provincial police chief, allegedly killing 40 and injuring between 8 and 60 Taliban, whilst Afghan forces suffered 4 killed and 6 wounded. US surveillance aircraft are supporting Afghan forces as they try to push the Taliban back, there has also been fighting in at least 6 other districts, where a further 28 Taliban fighters were killed with another 28 wounded. On 18 July 2016, at least 100 Taliban fighters attacked Qalai Zal district, Kunduz Province, in an attempt to take the district, but Afghan forces pushed them back, 8 Taliban – including a commander – were killed, while 1 Afghan security force member was killed and three others wounded.

The Taliban executed at least 10 people, some of whom were reportedly off-duty soldiers from the Afghan army on 31 May 2016 after kidnapping up to 220 people from buses and cars at a checkpoint on the Kunduz-Takhar highway. The majority of the passengers were released after they were interrogated by the Taliban insurgents, however at least 18 individuals still remained hostage. On 7 June 2016, in Ghazni province 12 members of Afghan security forces were killed, they include seven policemen, three soldiers, and two officials from the National Directorate of Security, the next day in the northern province of Kunduz Taliban fighters stopped a bus on a highway near the provincial capital and abducted 40 passengers—the second such abduction in the province in less than two weeks.

On 1 June 2016, Taliban insurgents stormed a court in the Afghan city of Ghazni, clashing with police for at least an hour in an attack in which 10 people, including all five of the militants, were killed, police said. The attack came days after the Taliban, vowed to seek revenge for the execution last month of six Taliban prisoners by the Afghan government. Another retaliatory attack for the execution of prisoners by the Afghan government came on 5 June 2016, leaving at least 5 people killed and at least 19 others injured at an appeals court in Pul-e Alam in Logar province, among the five killed in the attack was the newly named head of the appeals court. Later same day an Afghan member of parliament, Shir Wali Wardak, was killed by a bomb planted near his residence in the capital Kabul, another 11 people were injured by the blast, no group has claimed responsibility.

In June 2016, President Obama approved a policy to give the US military greater ability to accompany and enable Afghan forces fighting the Taliban; the decision also allowed for greater use of US air power, particularly in CAS missions. The US commander in Afghanistan, General John Nicholson, was given the power to decide when American troops could accompany conventional Afghan forces into the field; something they had previously only been allowed to do with Afghan special forces. A senior US defense official said that the expanded powers were only meant to be employed "in those select instances in which their engagement can enable strategic effects on the battlefield." Previous US rules of engagement in Afghanistan had imposed limits on US forces ability to strike at insurgents; being allowed to take action against the Taliban in moments when their assistance was needed to prevent a significant Afghan military setback. At the time, the Taliban were refocusing their attention mostly on Helmand, Kandahar, and Uruzgan provinces, according to US and Afghan military officials, although the insurgents had also struck elsewhere. The Taliban presence in the region numbered as many as 25,000 fighters with more than 30,000 Afghan security forces fighting to quell the group's resurgence. On 24 June, it was reported that in the previous week, the US military had launched its first airstrikes against the Taliban since the change in US policy; carrying out a "couple" of airstrikes on targets in southern Afghanistan. In July 2016, President Obama announced plans to leave 8,400 US troops in Afghanistan upon the conclusion of his term, rather than reducing the number of personnel to 5,500 troops by the end of the year, reflecting the difficulty of drawing down the US presence in the country. Whilst the UK sent up to 50 additional military personnel to Afghanistan: 21 joined the counter-terrorism mission, 15 were involved in a leadership development at the Afghan army's officer training academy, and 13 joined the Resolute Support Mission, along with the 450 British troops already in the country. UK troops had been due to leave Afghanistan in 2016, but their mission was extended into 2017. UK troops remained in the country until 2021.

On 30 June 2016, two suicide bombers attacked an Afghan police convoy carrying recently graduated cadets on the western outskirts of the capital Kabul, killing up to 40 cadets, while injuring 40 more. The incident came 10 days after an attack on a bus carrying Nepali security guards working for the Canadian embassy in Kabul that killed 14 people.

As of July 2016, Time magazine estimated that at least 20% of Afghanistan was under Taliban control with southernmost Helmand Province as major stronghold, while General Nicholson stated that Afghan official armed forces' casualties had risen 20 percent compared to 2015. On 23 July 2016, Afghan and US forces began an offensive to clear Nangarhar province of Islamic State militants hours after the Kabul bombing, the operation was dubbed "Wrath of the Storm" involving both Afghan regular army and special forces and is the Afghan army's first major strategic offensive of the summer. The operation was backed by US special forces troops and airstrikes; five US special forces troops were wounded by small arms fire or shrapnel over 24 and 25 July whilst clearing areas of southern Nangarhar with Afghan special operations troops, it appeared to be the first reported instance of US troops being wounded in fighting ISIL in Afghanistan. On 26 July, in overnight raid in Kot district during the operation, supported by foreign air support, one of the most important leaders of IS in the region, Saad Emarati, one of the founders of the ISIL-KP, was killed along with 120 other suspected militants killed; by 30 July killed hundreds of IS militants in eastern Afghanistan. Afghan troops pushed into Kot district after a heavy air and artillery bombardment that forced Daesh to flee into nearby mountain areas, Afghan forces met little resistance, finding an already destroyed training camp, by 30 July, the provincial governor said that 78 Daesh fighters had been killed in the operation. The operation reclaimed large and significant parts of eastern Afghanistan, forcing Daesh militants back into the mountains of southern Nangarhar. The estimated size of the ISIL-KP in January 2016 was around 3,000, but by July 2016 the number had been reduced to closely 1,000 to 1,500, with 70% of its fighters come from the TTP.

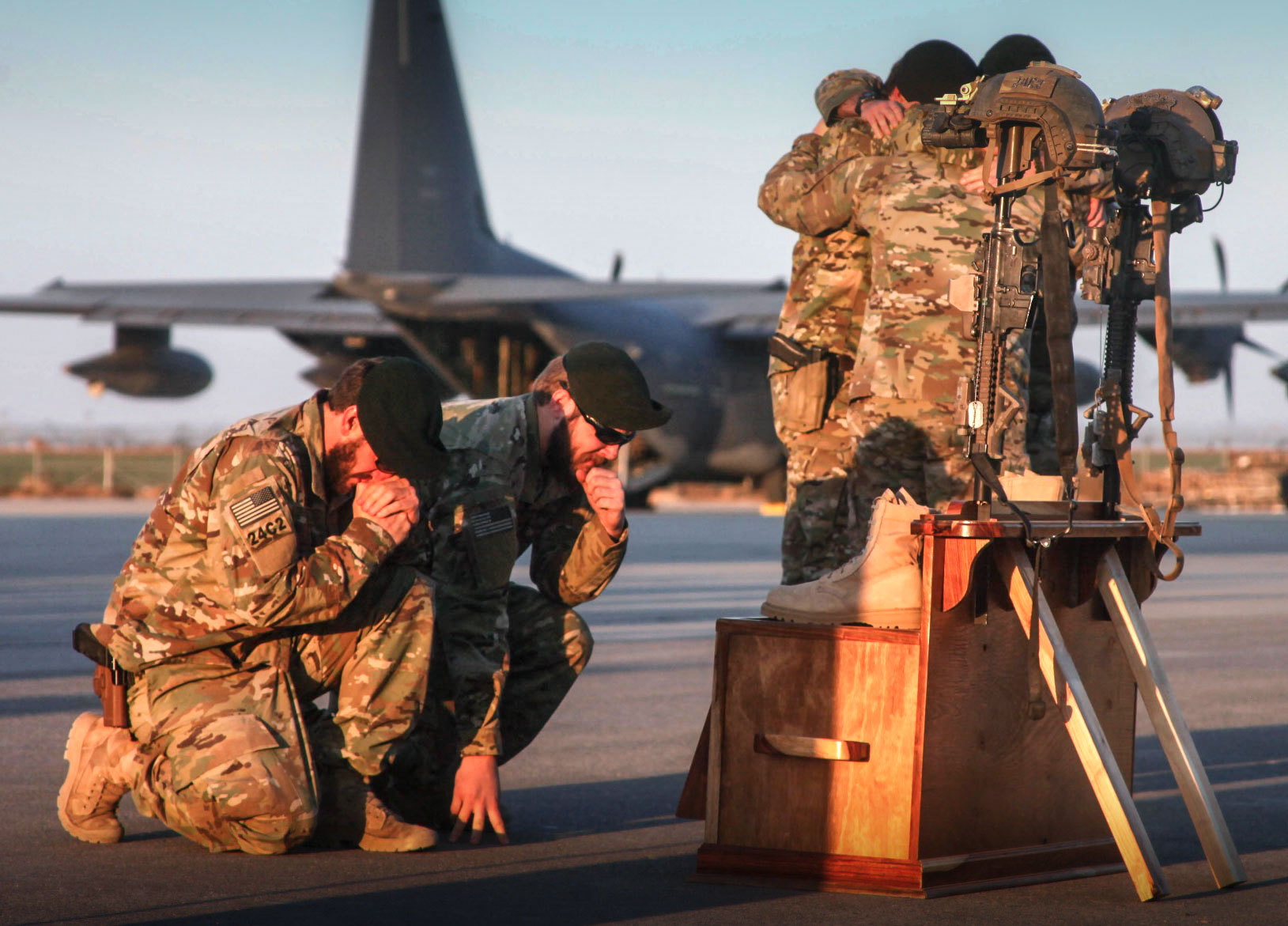
Green Berets of the 10th SFG memorialize two comrades who were killed in action during the Battle of Boz Qandahari on 2–3 November 2016

On 4 October 2016, A US soldier from B Company, 2nd Battalion, 10th SFG was killed by a roadside bomb blast in Achin, Nangarhar province, he was on a patrol with Afghan forces during an operation against ISIL-K militants. This marked the first time a US serviceperson was killed in combat against IS militants in the country. The Washington Post reported that during October, as part of coordinated attacks on several cities in the country in an attempt to retake territory lost during the invasion, Farah was besieged for three weeks by the Taliban and was only ended with US air support. Afghan intelligence officials said four dead Iranian Commandos were discovered, village elders told Afghan provincial officials that many Taliban dead and wounded were taken back across the Iranian border, where the insurgents had been recruited and trained. CNN reported that during the month, US aircraft dropped 203 bombs, missiles and other munitions on Taliban and local ISIS targets in Afghanistan.

In December 2016, CNN reported that the Afghan Air Force was beginning to conduct its first independent airstrikes. The Afghan government had become increasingly reliant on Afghan Special Forces to carry out the fight against ISIS and the Taliban, with that 17,000-strong force responsible for 70% of offensive military operations at the time. Commander of the international coalition General John Nicholson acknowledged that this operational tempo would be difficult to sustain. As of December 2016, there were 9,800 US service members in Afghanistan. Nicholson told reporters at the Pentagon that the number of US forces would be reduced to 8,450 by 2017; the US and its 39 coalition partners in Afghanistan are committed to providing support to Afghanistan for through 2020, in particular, Nicholson added that the international community had pledged millions of dollars and advisory support to Afghanistan – these commitments would help grow the size of the Afghan Special Forces. Even with the US providing advisers and airstrikes to the Afghan forces, the US military believes that the government only controls about 64% of the country, with the Taliban controlling about 10% and the remainder being contested by the army and the insurgency; Nicholson also said that US-led operations in 2016 had killed or captured 50 leaders from al Qaeda and AQIS. On 24 December 2016, Military.com reported that Brigadier General Charles Cleveland said that ISIL-K's presence in the country has been pushed back from nearly a dozen districts to just two or three, the number of its members in Afghanistan had been reduced to about 1,000 from an estimated strength of between 1,500 and 3,000 members the previous year. Overall, US troops in Afghanistan conducted more than 350 operations against the IS and al-Qaeda in 2016, with more than 200 al-Qaeda members killed or captured. In early December, General Nicholson said that US-led counter-terrorism operations and Afghan government forces had killed 12 of the organization's top leaders in the country; US officials have said IS fighters are primarily located in Nangarhar and Kunar Province's and Al-Qaida fighters operate in at least six provinces as well as along the country's eastern border. In January 2017, the Marine Corps Times reported that according to an inspector general, the Afghan army comprises about 169,000 soldiers, but in 2016 they suffered a 33 percent attrition rate—a 7 percent increase from 2015.

=== 2016 peace deal ===
On 22 September 2016, the Afghan government signed a draft peace deal with Hezb-i-Islami. According to the draft agreement, Hezb-i-Islami agreed to cease hostilities, cut ties to extremist groups and respect the Afghan Constitution, in exchange for government recognition of the group and support for the removal of United Nations and American sanctions against Hekmatyar, who was also promised an honorary post in the government. The agreement was formalized on 29 September by both Afghan President Ashraf Ghani and Hekmatyar who appeared via a video link in the presidential palace, signing the agreement.

== 2017 ==
=== Events ===
Map showing insurgent and government-controlled areas of Afghanistan, as of 23 January 2019

In early January 2017, the Marine Corps Times reported that Afghan forces seek to rebuild, following an exhausting 2016 fighting season; 33 districts, which are spread across 16 Afghan provinces, are under insurgent control whilst 258 are under government control and nearly 120 districts remain "contested".

On 9 February 2017, General John Nicholson told Congress that NATO and allied forces in Afghanistan are facing a "stalemate" and that he needed a few thousand additional troops to more effectively train and advise Afghan soldiers. He also asserted that Russia was trying to "legitimize" the Taliban by creating the "false narrative" that the militant organization has been fighting the Islamic State and that Afghan forces have not, he asserted Russia's goal, was "to undermine the United States and NATO" in Afghanistan. However, he said that the area in which Islamic State fighters operate in Afghanistan had been greatly reduced. A US Special Forces soldier was severely wounded that day when the base he was at was attacked in Helmand province. Nicholson later indicated the soldier was wounded in Sangin.

The Military Times reported that on 26 February 2017, a USAF airstrike that killed the Taliban leadership commander Mullah Abdul Salam in Kunduz province in a joint operation with Afghan security forces. The airstrike marked a renewed strategy by US forces under the Trump administration to remove the Taliban leadership/commanders from the battlefield. The Obama administration strategy had focused much of its efforts in pushing reconciliation between the Taliban and the central government of Afghanistan; although in June 2016, to turn back the tide of Taliban gains, President Obama changed the rules of engagement to give US commanders more flexibility to provide airstrikes and ground support to struggling Afghan forces, if those efforts were perceived to provide "strategic effects." It made a concerted effort to kill high-profile al-Qaeda and Haqqani terrorists-groups officially designated as terrorist organizations by the US State Department-while attempting to draw down US and NATO forces in the region, having a tangible successes.

The Army Times reported that in early March 2017, American and Afghan forces launched Operation Hamza to "flush" ISIS-K from its stronghold in eastern Afghanistan, engaging in regular ground battles. Stars and Stripes reported that General Dawlat Waziri, spokesman for Afghanistan's Defense Ministry, said that for four weeks before 13 April Nangarhar airstrike (which was part of the operation), Afghan special forces unsuccessfully attempted to penetrate the area because of the difficult terrain and improvised explosive device (IEDs) planted by ISIS-KP militants. The governor of Achin province Ismail Shinwary, confirmed to the BBC that two weeks preceding the strike that Afghan special forces, with the US air support, had begun anti-IS operations in the area two weeks ago.

In April 2017, the Washington Post reported that Captain Bill Salvin, a spokesman for NATO's mission to Afghanistan, said that Afghan and international forces had reduced ISIS-K controlled territory in Afghanistan by two-thirds and had killed around half their fighters in the previous two years. Since the beginning of 2017, 460 airstrikes against terrorists (with drone strikes alone killing more than 200 IS militants); he added that the affiliate has an estimated 600–800 fighters in two eastern Afghan provinces.

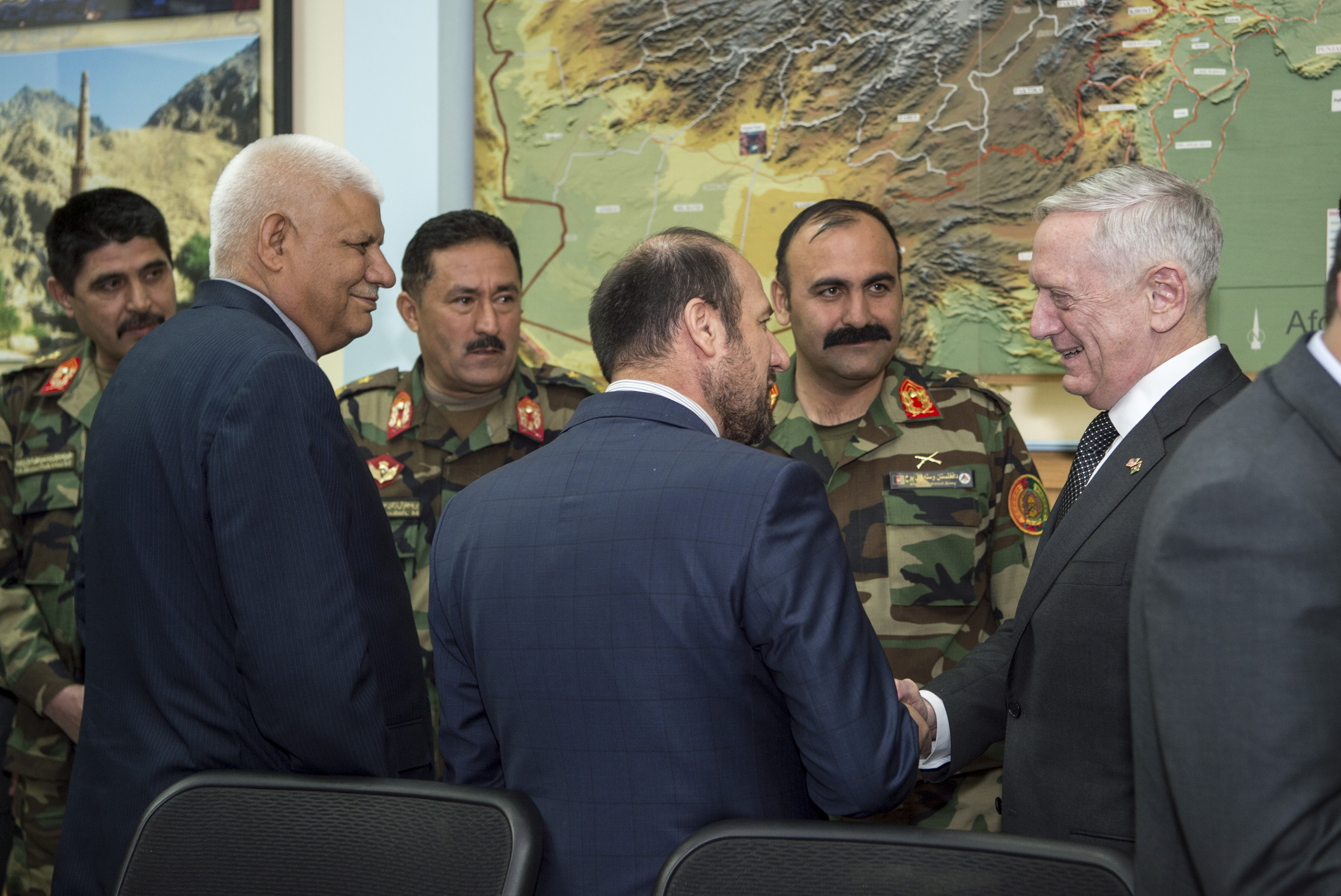
US Secretary of Defense James Mattis speaks with Afghanistan's Minister of Defense Abdullah Habibi, Kabul, April 2017

On 13 April 2017, the United States dropped the largest non-nuclear bomb, known as the GBU-43/B Massive Ordnance Air Blast (MOAB) Mother of All Bombs, at 34.073336, 70.631215 (latitude and longitude coordinates) near Momand village upon a Nangahar's Achin District village in eastern Afghanistan to destroy tunnel complexes used by the Islamic State of Iraq and the Levant – Khorasan Province (ISIL-KP or ISIS-K). The Guardian reported that following the strike, US and Afghan forces conducted clearing operations and airstrikes in the area and assessed the damage.

On 21 April 2017, Islamic Emirate of Afghanistan fighters along with Afghan security forces allied to them stormed 209th Corps military base near Mazar-e-Sharif, killing over 140 Afghan soldiers.

On 28 April 2017, the Washington Post reported that the Taliban announced the beginning of their spring offensive dubbed "Operation Mansouri." On 20 May, Islamic Emirate of Afghanistan fully secured Waghaz District in the province of Ghazni, while at the same time stormed Dih Yak district center and blew up Governor of Ghazni compound in Ghazni city. Another major assault took place on 22 May in Shah Wali Kot district, Northern Kandahar province, during which Taliban managed to capture large military base, while inflicting heavy casualties to the Afghan army, reportedly killing 35 and capturing four soldiers as well as three Armoured Personnel Carriers. During the same day they had overrun a border outpost in southern Shorabak district, killing 15 soldiers, in addition to another outpost in district of Khakrez, killing eight more. The next day rebels assaulted another military base in Shah Wali Kot and an outpost, killing four soldiers and injuring four more, while pro-government forces abandoned a village in northern district of Maruf. On 24 May, the Taliban assaulted a base in Maiwand district, killing 13 soldiers. Taliban launched another attack in province of Kandahar on 26 May, killing at least 18 soldiers, injuring 16 more and capturing four, according to security officials, while the group itself claimed to have killed 35 soldiers and capturing seven more, while also seizing seven Armoured Personnel Carriers and an array of weapons. On 27 May, 13 members of Khost Provincial Force, a CIA funded and equipped paramilitary group, known for torture and extrajudicial killings, were killed after a Taliban car bomb blew up in Khost city.

On 31 May 2017, the German embassy in Kabul was attacked by a suicide truck, located in the heavily fortified area of Kabul, killing over 90 and injuring over 350. No one claimed responsibility for the attack. The bomb went off at about 08:25 local time (03:55 GMT) during rush hour. The fortified area is considered the safest area of Kabul, with 3 m (10 ft) tall blast walls. India's foreign minister Sushma Swaraj said its embassy staff were safe.

The Guardian reported that following the announcement of Donald Trump new strategy in the country, More than 900 munitions were released in August and September, bringing the total number of munitions used in 2017 to nearly 3,000, more than twice the expended munitions in 2016.

On 14 October 2017, The Guardian reported that there were then between 600 and 800 ISIL-KP militants left in Afghanistan, who are mostly concentrated in Nangarhar Province. CNN reported that throughout October, US aircraft dropped 653 bombs, missiles and other munitions on Taliban and local ISIL targets in Afghanistan; military officials said that the success against ISIS in Iraq and Syria has freed up air assets to be deployed to Afghanistan and other theatres.

The Washington Post reported that on 20 November 2017, General John Nicholson announced that US aircraft were targeting drug production facilities in Afghanistan under a new strategy aimed at cutting off Taliban funding, saying that the Taliban was "becoming a criminal organization" that was earning about $200 million a year from drug-related activities. President Ashraf Ghani strongly endorsed the new campaign of US and Afghan airstrikes against the Taliban-run narcotic centers; the following day, a spokesman for the Helmand governor's office said that the past week's air operations involving coalition forces and Afghan air force planes conducted "direct strikes on Taliban hideouts and narcotics centers" (eight strikes by the coalition and two by the Afghan Air Force), killing more than 40 Taliban fighters and that a "main processing center of narcotics was destroyed" along with about 2,200 pounds of drugs. CNN reported that the campaign is known as Operation Jagged Knife, three of the strikes occurred in Kajaki district, four in Musa Qala and one in Sangin; a Pentagon spokesman said that the airstrikes were carried out by US F-16s and B-52s, General Nicholson told reporters at the Pentagon that a US F-22 Raptor and Afghan Air Force A-29s also participated in the strikes. Nicholson estimated that there are approximately 400 to 500 such facilities in Afghanistan and that "these operations will continue on in the coming days." CNN also reported that General Nicholson said "our priority's been in Iraq and Syria and, as we continue to see success there, we hope to see more assets coming over to enable us to do more of these kinds of operations", the strikes marked the first time commanders used their newly granted authorities to target Taliban revenue sources. Vice President Mike Pence announced on 21 December 2017 that Afghan President Ashraf Ghani told him that more senior Taliban leaders have been killed in 2017 than in all prior years of the war combined. Pence also stated that the USA was making great progress with the war in Afghanistan.

=== Donald Trump's Afghan policy ===
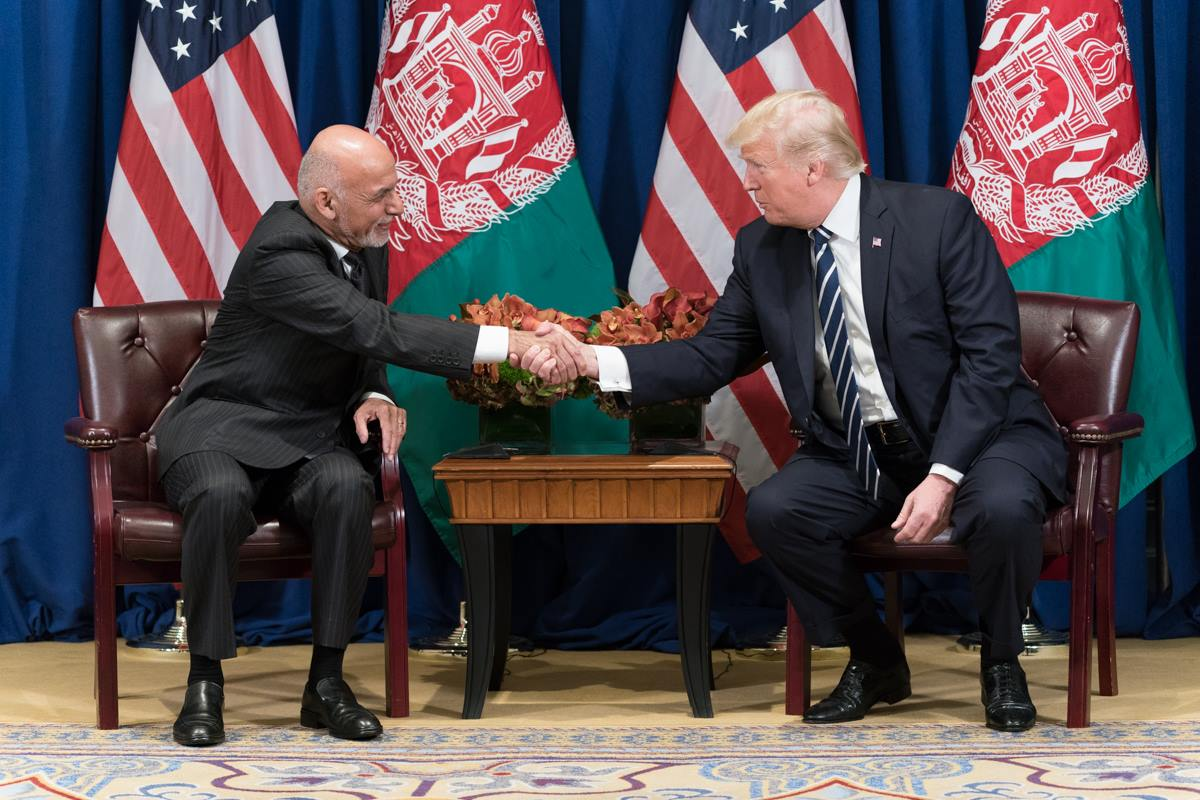
US President Donald Trump with Afghan President Ashraf Ghani in October 2017

On 21 August 2017, US President Donald Trump stated that he would expand the American presence in Afghanistan, without giving details on how or when. Trump did not formulate any timelines, troop numbers or specific purposes to be met; only that a US withdrawal was not an option now as it would play into the hands of terrorists and that publicizing deadlines and exact plans would only help those groups prepare. Trump also said that 20 US designated terrorist organizations are active in Afghanistan and Pakistan. According to The Washington Post, this contradicts the official US Government list which only has 13 such organizations.

The Guardian reported that Afghan government officials praised the new strategy, not only for increasing troop numbers and removing with strict timelines, but for increasing pressure on Pakistan-which they see as a main sponsor of the insurgency. In a televised address, President Trump said a new approach to Pakistan would be a "pillar" of the new strategy, adding that "we can no longer be silent about Pakistan's safe havens for terrorist organizations, the Taliban and other groups that pose a threat to the region and beyond;" Najibullah Azad, a spokesman for the Afghan president, said that "the strategy is made in accordance with realities on the ground", and that "this is the first time the US government is coming with a very clear-cut message to Pakistan to either stop what you're doing or face the negative consequences." Other statements by Afghan officials such as Davood Moradian, the director general of the Afghan Institute for Strategic Studies in Kabul, said that "the new strategy is premised on 'peace through strength', in contrast to Obama's failed approach, which was essentially 'peace through appeasement'." In response, Pakistani security officials accused Trump of shifting blame for its failures in the war against the Taliban and other armed groups in Afghanistan and of endangering the already fraught bilateral relations between the two countries.

On 15 September 2017, the New York Times reported that the CIA was seeking authority to conduct its own drone strikes in Afghanistan and other war zones, according to current and former intelligence and military officials, and that the change in authority was being considered by the White House as part of the new strategy despite concerns by the Pentagon. On 19 September 2017, the Trump Administration deployed another 3,000 US troops to Afghanistan. They would add to the approximately 11,000 US troops already serving in Afghanistan, bringing the total to at least 14,000 US troops stationed in Afghanistan. On 4 October 2017, Fox News reported that Defense Secretary Jim Mattis approved a change in rules of engagement as part of the new strategy so that there is no longer a requirement for US troops to be in contact with enemy forces in Afghanistan before opening fire.

== 2018 – 2021 ==
=== 2018 ===
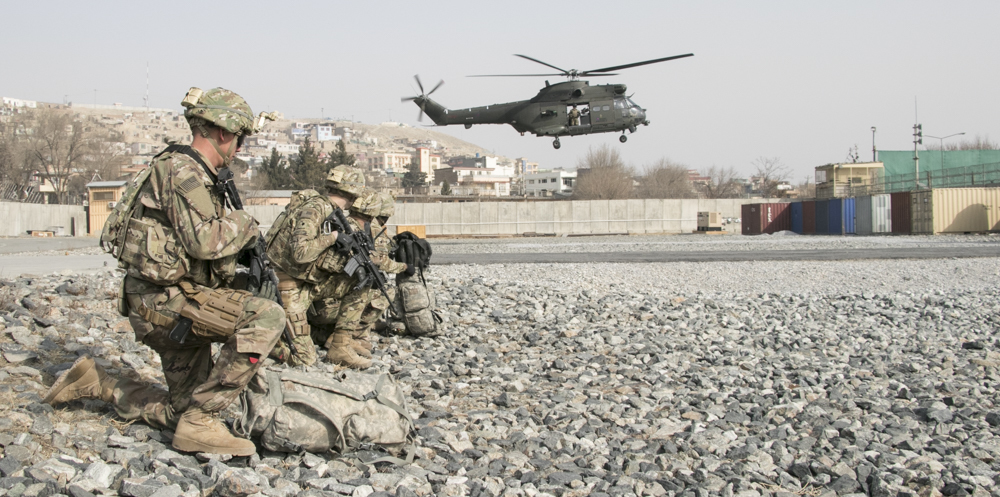
US, British and Afghan security forces train together in an aerial reaction force exercise at Camp Qargha in Kabul, 16 January 2018.

In January 2018, the BBC reported that the Taliban are openly active in 70% of the country (being in full control of 14 districts and have an active and open physical presence in a further 263) and that Islamic State is more active in the country than ever before. Following attacks by the Taliban and Islamic State that killed scores of civilians, President Trump and Afghan officials decided to rule out any talks with the Taliban.

On 15 February 2018, The New York Times reported the rise of Afghan civilians being intentionally targeted by the Taliban, based on an annual United Nations report released a week earlier. This report offered a detailed assessment of the 16-year Afghan war, showing the rise of complex bombing attacks deliberately targeting civilians in 2017, having 10,453 Afghan civilians wounded or killed. As the US and Afghan government began publishing fewer statistics, the U.N. report became one of the most reliable indicators about the war's impact by 2018. The report emphasized the rise of "complex attacks", a type of suicide assault that were becoming more deadly, described by the New York Times as the hallmark of the war in 2018. These attacks were referred to as the Taliban's ferocious response to US President Trump's new strategy of war (an increased pace of aerial bombardments targeting Taliban and Islamic State Militants), giving the message that the Taliban could strike at will, even in the capital city, Kabul. The U.N. report included a statement showing the Taliban's position, the Taliban blamed the U.S and its allies for fighting the war in Afghanistan, and it denied targeting civilians. The New York Times quoted Atiqullah Amarkhel, a retired general and military analyst based in Kabul, saying that the UN report proved the failure of peace talks, as the Taliban and the US government are both determined for victory rather than negotiating a settlement. He said, "More airstrikes mean more suicide attacks", proving the intensification of the war by 2018.

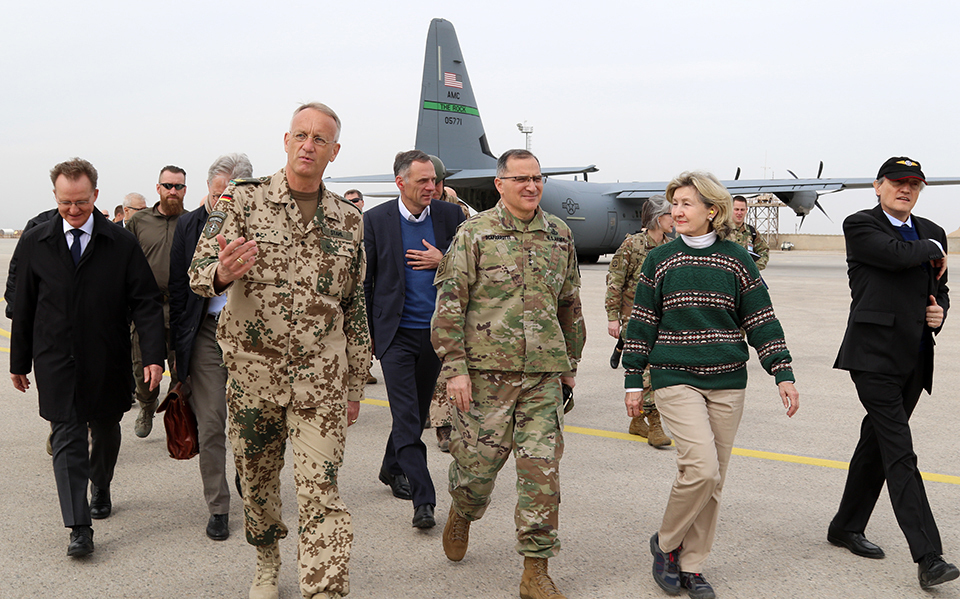
Curtis Scaparrotti, the Supreme Allied Commander Europe, and Kay Bailey Hutchison with Brig. Gen. Wolf-Jürgen Stahl in Afghanistan in February 2018

In July the Taliban carried out the Darzab offensive and captured Darzab District following the surrender of ISIL-K to the Afghan Government.

In August 2018, the Taliban launched a series of offensives, the largest being the Ghazni offensive. During the Ghazni offensive, the Taliban seized Ghazni, Afghanistan's sixth-largest city for several days but eventually retreated. The Taliban were successful in killing hundreds of Afghan soldiers and police and captured several government bases and districts.

Following the offensives Erik Prince, the private military contractor and former head of Blackwater, advocated additional privatization of the war. However, the then-US Defense Secretary James Mattis rebuked the idea, saying, “When Americans put their nation's credibility on the line, privatizing it is probably not a wise idea.”

In September 2018, the United Nations raised concerns over the increasing number of civilian casualties due to air strikes in Afghanistan. The US air force dropped around 3,000 bombs in the first six months of the year, to force Taliban militants for peace talks. In a statement issued by the UNAMA, it reminded all the parties involved in the conflict "to uphold their obligations to protect civilians from harm.”

On 17 October 2018, days before a parliamentary election, candidate Abdul Jabar Qahraman was killed in an attack by the Taliban. The Taliban issued a statement, warning teachers and students to not participate in the upcoming elections or use schools as polling centers.

On 17 December 2018, US diplomats held talks with the Taliban in the United Arab Emirates on possibly ending the war. The Taliban gave conditions of a pullout date for US-led troops before any talks with the Kabul government and demanded that Washington did not oppose the establishment of an Islamist government. However, the US officials insisted on keeping some troops and at least a couple of bases in the country. The meeting was described by US officials as “part of efforts by the United States and other international partners to promote an intra-Afghan dialogue aimed at ending the conflict in Afghanistan.”

=== 2019 ===
Ongoing armed conflicts in June 2019. Major wars, 10,000 or more deaths in current or past year

On 25 January 2019, Afghanistan's president Ashraf Ghani said that more than 45,000 members of the Afghan security forces had been killed since he became president in 2014. He also said that there had been fewer than 72 international casualties during the same period. A January 2019 report by the US government estimated that 53.8% of Afghanistan's districts were controlled or influenced by the government, with 33.9% contested and 12.3% under insurgent control or influence.

On 4 February 2019, the Taliban attacked a checkpoint in northern Baghlan province. 21 people, including 11 policemen were killed. The same day, another attack took place in northern Samangan province that killed 10 people.

On 25 February 2019, peace talks began between the Taliban and the United States in Qatar, with the Taliban co-founder Abdul Ghani Barada notably present. US special envoy Zalmay Khalilzad reported that that round of negotiations was "more productive than they have been in the past" and that a draft version of a peace agreement had been agreed upon. The deal involved the withdrawal of US and international troops from Afghanistan and the Taliban not allowing other jihadist groups to operate within the country. The Taliban also had reported that progress was being made in the negotiations.

On 1 March 2019, the Taliban led an assault against Shorab military base, in Helmand, killing 23 security forces and wounding 20.

On 30 April 2019, Afghan government forces undertook clearing operations directed against both ISIS-K and the Taliban in eastern Nangarhar Province, after the two groups fought for over a week over a group of villages in an area of illegal talc mining. The National Directorate of Security claimed 22 ISIS-K fighters were killed and two weapons caches destroyed, while the Taliban claimed US-backed Afghan forces killed seven civilians; a provincial official said over 9,000 families had been displaced by the fighting.

On 28 July 2019, President Ashraf Ghani's running mate Amrullah Saleh's office was attacked by a suicide bomber and a few militants. At least 20 people were killed and 50 injured, with Saleh also amongst the injured ones. During the six-hour-long operation, more than 150 civilians were rescued and three militants were killed.

Map showing the war as of January 2019 Under control of the Afghan Government, NATO, and Allies Under control of the Taliban, Al-Qaeda, and Allies Under control of the Islamic State of Iraq and the Levant (ISIL) and Allies Under control of the Pakistani Army

By August, the Taliban controlled more territory than at any point since 2001. The Washington Post reported that the US was close to reaching a peace deal with the Taliban and was preparing to withdraw 5,000 troops from Afghanistan. The same month, however, it was later confirmed that some Taliban leaders, including Taliban emir Hibatullah Akhunzada's brother Hafiz Ahmadullah and some other relatives, were killed in a bomb blast at the Khair Ul Madarais mosque, which was located in the Quetta suburb of Kuchlak and had long served as the main meeting place of members of the Taliban. In September, the US canceled the negotiations.

On 3 September 2019, the Taliban claimed responsibility for the suicide attack in Afghanistan's capital, targeting the Green Village Compound in Kabul. According to the reports, nearly 16 civilians died, while 119 were reported to be injured.

On 15 September 2019, 38 Taliban fighters, including two senior commanders, were killed in a joint US-Afghan military operation.

On 17 September 2019, a suicide bomber attacked the campaign rally of President Ashraf Ghani, killing 26 people and wounding 42. Less than an hour later, the Taliban carried out another suicide bomb attack near the US Embassy and the Afghan Defense Ministry, killing 22 people and wounded around 38.

On 27 October 2019, 80 Taliban fighters were killed as a result of joint Afghan-US military operations in Kandahar and Faryab.

=== 2020 ===
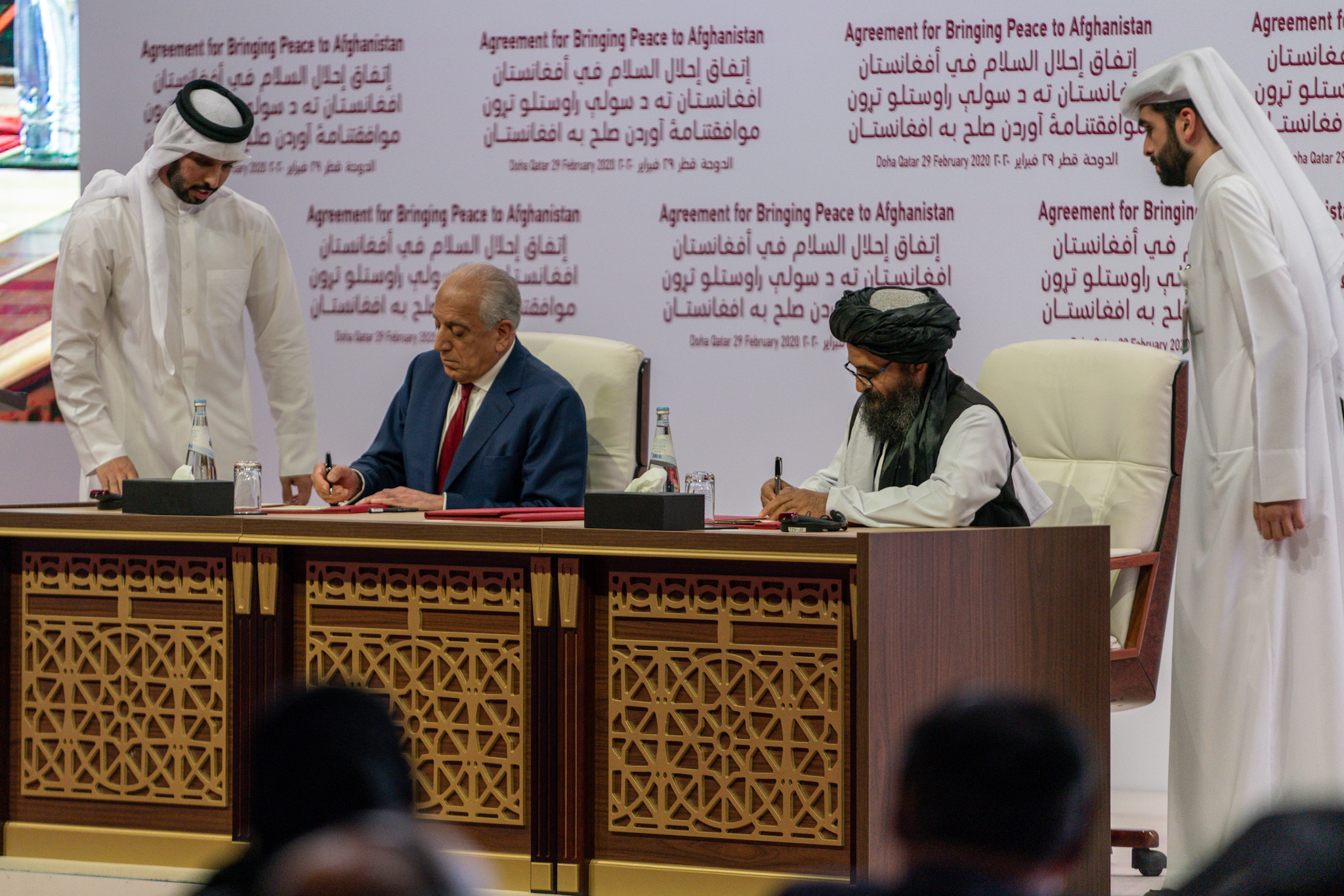
US representative Zalmay Khalilzad (left) and Taliban representative Abdul Ghani Baradar (right) sign the Agreement for Bringing Peace to Afghanistan in Doha, Qatar on 29 February 2020

Peace negotiations had resumed in December 2019. This round of talks resulted in a seven-day partial ceasefire which began on 22 February 2020. On 29 February, the United States and the Taliban signed a conditional peace deal in Doha, Qatar that called for a prisoner exchange within ten days and was supposed to lead to US troops withdrawal from Afghanistan within 14 months. However, the Afghan government was not a party to the deal, and, in a press conference the next day, President Ghani criticized the deal for being "signed behind closed doors." He said the Afghan government had "made no commitment to free 5,000 Taliban prisoners" and that such an action "is not the United States' authority, but it is the authority of the government of Afghanistan.” Ghani also stated that any prisoner exchange "cannot be a prerequisite for talks" but rather must be negotiated within the talks.

The Taliban resumed offensive operations against the Afghan army and police on 3 March, conducting attacks in Kunduz and Helmand provinces. On 4 March, the United States retaliated by launching an air strike against Taliban fighters in Helmand.

On 6 March, ISIS-K killed 32 people in a mass shooting in Kabul. Between 3 and 27 March, the Taliban claimed 405 attacks against Afghan security forces.

On 20 April 2020, Taliban in another attack killed at least 23 Afghan troops and nine civilians.

In April 2020, the New York Times documented Afghan war casualties from 27 March until 23 April and informed that at least 262 pro-government forces, alongside 50 civilians have been killed in almost a month's time. Additionally, hundreds of civilians and Afghan forces also got injured.

On 2 May 2020, Afghan authorities released at least 100 Taliban members from prison in Kabul. This came in response to the peace deal with the US, which the Taliban argues assured them their 5,000 inmates being released. However, the Afghan government, which denied release and any authority by the US over decision, has now agreed to free 1500 members of the militia organization.

At 10 am on 12 May 2020 in Kabul, three gunmen wearing police uniforms carried out a mass shooting in the maternity ward of a hospital in Kabul. The hospital is located in the Shi'ite Hazara neighborhood of Dashte Barchi. The hospital is assisted by Médecins Sans Frontières personnel. The attackers killed 24 people, including two newborn babies and injured another 16. All of the attackers were killed by Afghan security forces and their mentoring Norwegian special forces. According to Frederic Bonnot, Médecins Sans Frontières' head of programs in Afghanistan: "I went back the day after the attack and what I saw in the maternity (ward) demonstrates it was a systematic shooting of the mothers. They went through the rooms in the maternity (ward), shooting women in their beds. It was methodical. Walls sprayed with bullets, blood on the floors in the rooms, vehicles burnt out and windows shot through." Bonnot added: "It's shocking. We know this area has suffered attacks in the past, but no one could believe they would attack a maternity. They came to kill the mothers." About an hour after the Kabul attack, a suicide bombing took place in Kuz Kunar District, Nangarhar Province at the funeral of Shaikh Akram, a police commander who died of a heart attack a day before, killing 32 people. 133 others were injured, some severely. Two days later, the Taliban carried out a retaliation attack near a court in Gardez, Paktia: a suicide truck bomber tried to explode himself outside a military compound, but exploded before its destination. The attack resulted in five civilians killed and at least 29 others injured. The Taliban claimed this as a revenge attack, after President Ashraf Ghani blamed the group for the attack at the maternity hospital; the Taliban denied responsibility for that attack.

On 30 July, a suicide car bomber killed 17 people in Puli Alam, Logar Province.

=== 2021 ===
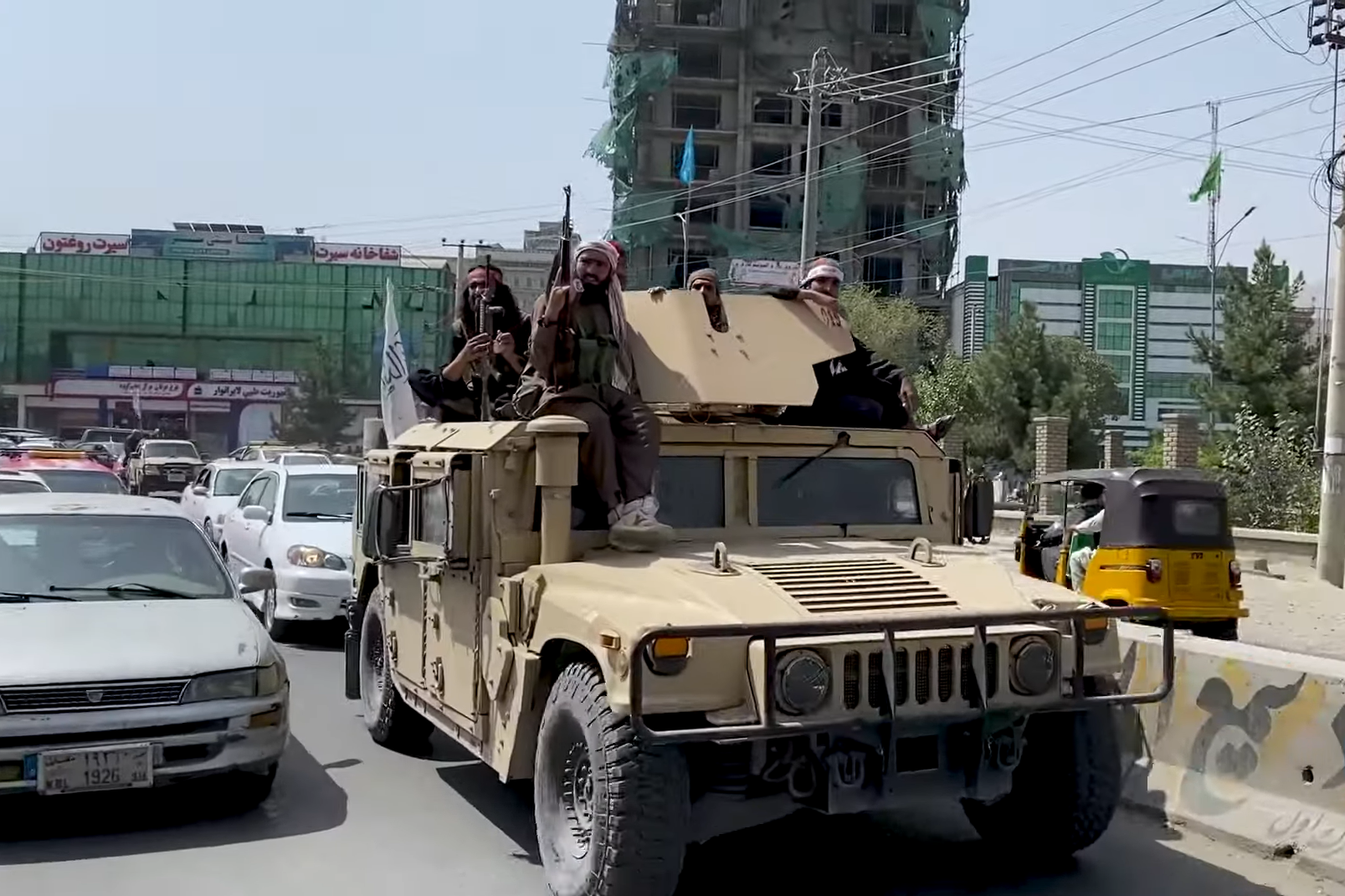
Taliban fighters in Kabul, 17 August 2021

The Taliban insurgency intensified considerably in 2021, as US armed forces completed their withdrawal from the country by September. On 30 April, a bombing in Puli Alam killed about 30 people. On 8 May, the bombing of a secondary school in west Kabul killed about 45 people. Most casualties were female students, who were leaving the school at the time. No group so far has claimed responsibility for those two attacks. On 15 May, an ISIL bombing inside a mosque in Kabul killed 12 people. On 1 June, two ISIL bus bombings killed 10 people in Kabul. On July 5, 2021, Afghan soldiers were reported to have fled to Tajikistan to escape clashes with Taliban insurgents. The Taliban gained control of various towns throughout June and July, eventually resulting in the Fall of Kabul on 15 August. The war was declared over the same day, with the Taliban giving foreign forces until the 31st of August to leave the country. A small resistance force led by Ahmad Massoud was formed in the Panjshir Valley on 16 August. This led to a brief conflict with the new Taliban government, however, on 26 August, the two sides signed a peace treaty and agreed not to attack each other.

== Bibliography ==
- 9–11 Commission (20 September 2004). "National Commission on Terrorist Attacks Upon the United States". Archived from the original on 11 February 2010.
- Barfield, Thomas (2012). Afghanistan: A Cultural and Political History. Princeton University Press. ISBN 978-0-691-15441-1.
- Coll, Steve (2004). Ghost Wars: The Secret History of the CIA, Afghanistan, and Bin Laden, from the Soviet Invasion to September 10, 2001. New York: Penguin Press. ISBN 978-1-59420-007-6.
- Crawford, Neta (September 2011). "Civilian Death and Injury in Afghanistan, 2001–2011" (PDF). Costs of War Project.
- Jalali, Ali (2001). "Afghanistan: The Anatomy of an Ongoing Conflict". Parameters. 31 (1): 85–98. doi:10.55540/0031-1723.2024. S2CID 150407995.
- Rashid, Ahmed (2008). Descent into Chaos : the US and the Failure of Nation Building in Pakistan, Afghanistan, and Central Asia. Internet Archive. New York : Viking. ISBN 978-0-670-01970-0.
- Risen, James (2008). State of War: The Secret History of the CIA and the Bush Administration. Simon & Schuster UK. ISBN 978-1-84737-511-7.
- Wright, Donald P.; Bird, James; Clay, Steven; et al. (2010). A Different Kind of War: The United States Army in Operation Enduring Freedom (OEF) October 2001-September 2005 (PDF). Fort Leavenworth, Kansas: Combat Studies Institute Press. Archived from the original (PDF) on December 30, 2016.
- Woodward, Bob (27 September 2010). Obama's Wars. Simon & Schuster. ISBN 978-1-4391-7251-3.
