= Gulzar Khan (politician) =

Pakistani politician

- گلزار خان

Member of the National Assembly of Pakistan
- In office 1 June 2013 – 28 August 2017
- Preceded by: Arbab Muhammad Zahir
- Succeeded by: Arbab Amir Ayub
- Constituency: NA-4 (Peshawar-IV)
- Majority: 55,134

Personal details
- Died: 28 August 2017 Peshawar, Pakistan
- Party: Pakistan Tehreek-e-Insaf (2013-2014)
- Children: Shandana Gulzar

Gulzar Khan (Urdu: گلزار خان) (died 28 August 2017) was a Pakistani bureaucrat-turned-politician who had been a Member of the National Assembly of Pakistan from June 2013 to August 2017.

== Political career ==
Khan as bureaucrat served as Deputy Commissioner of Peshawar, Political Agent for South and North Waziristan and Commissioner for Afghan refugees. He also had been the home secretary for Khyber Pakhtunkhwa and Tribal Affairs Department and chairman of the Khyber Pakhtunkhwa Public Service Commission.

Khan joined Pakistan Tehreek-e-Insaf (PTI) before the 2013 Pakistani general election and was allocated the party ticket to contest the 2013 general election from Constituency NA-4 (Peshawar-IV). He was elected to the National Assembly of Pakistan as a candidate of PTI from Constituency NA-4 (Peshawar-IV) in 2013 general election. He received 55,134 votes and defeated Nasir Khan Musazai, a candidate of Pakistan Muslim League (N) (PML-N).

In 2014, Khan was elected as chairman of a group which consisted of 13 PTI's members of the National Assembly who opposed a PTI call to resign from the National Assembly during the Azadi march. He had quit the PTI and stopped attending the party meetings afterwards. In 2014, Imran Khan asked for disqualification of Khan from the membership of the National Assembly for violating party's discipline. However, his National Assembly membership was not revoked after Khan refused to quit his National Assembly seat over a difference of opinion as part of a normal democratic process.

During his tenure as member of the National Assembly, he served as chairman of the National Assembly's Standing Committee on Education, Training and Standards in Higher Education.

He died on 28 August 2017 after suffering from cardiac arrest in his native town, Masho Gogar in Badaber.
