= Pakistan–United States military relations =

Military relations between Pakistan and the United States

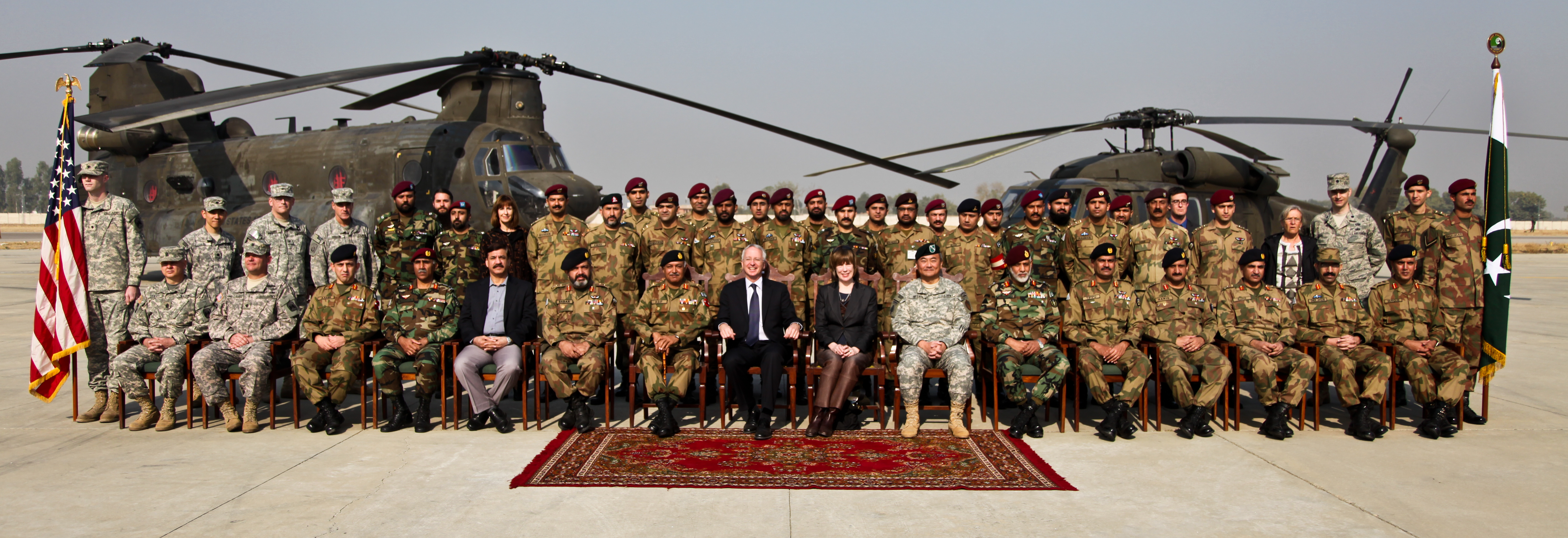
A unit photo of the Pakistan and the U.S. Armies in 2010, by Foreign Affairs.

Pakistan and the United States have had military relations since they established diplomatic relations in 1947. The militaries of the two countries have had historically close ties, and Pakistan was once described as "America's most allied ally in Asia" by Dwight D. Eisenhower, reflecting shared interests in security and stability across South Asia, Central Asia, and parts of Eastern Europe.

Initially, Pakistan cooperated closely with the United States on security matters during the Cold War. However, the relationship deteriorated in the 2010s due to U.S. concerns over Pakistan's alleged support for militant groups in Afghanistan, culminating in the suspension of all U.S. military aid to Pakistan. In response, Pakistan has increasingly turned to military cooperation with China. This partnership deepened following the United States' withdrawal from Afghanistan. According to the United States Institute for Peace, Pakistan has "increasingly sourced from China, especially the higher-end combat strike and power projection capabilities; and Pakistan continues to retire older U.S. and European origin platforms."

== U.S. presence in Pakistan ==
=== Issues relating to nonproliferation ===
In 1955, after Prime Minister Huseyn Suhrawardy established nuclear power to ease the electricity crisis, the U.S. offered a US$350,000 grant to acquire a commercial nuclear power plant. Following this year, the PAEC signed an agreement with its counterpart, the United States Atomic Energy Commission, where the United States initially started research on nuclear power and training. During the 1960s, the U.S. opened doors for Pakistan's scientists and engineers to conduct research at leading U.S. institutions, notably ANL, ORNL, and LLNL. In 1965, Abdus Salam went to the U.S. and convinced the U.S. government to help establish a national institute of nuclear research in Pakistan (PINSTECH) and a research reactor, Parr-I. The PINSTECH building was designed by leading American architect Edward Durrell Stone; American nuclear engineer Peter Karter designed the reactor, which was then supplied by the contractor American Machine and Foundry. Years later, the U.S. helped Pakistan acquire its first commercial nuclear power plant, Kanupp-I, from GE Canada in 1965. All this nuclear infrastructure was established by the U.S. throughout the 1960s, as part of the congressional Atoms for Peace program.

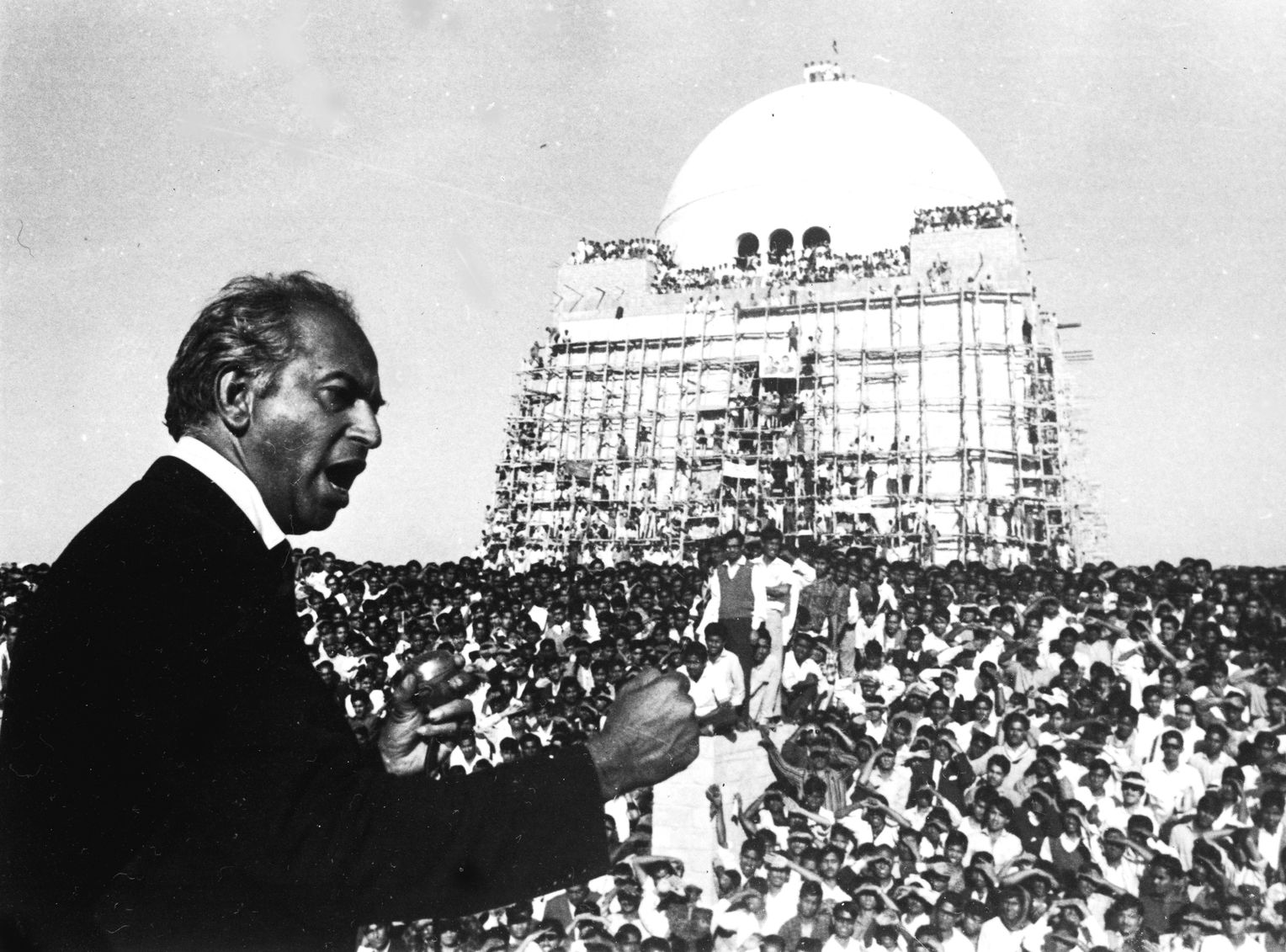
Prime Minister Zulfikar Ali Bhutto initiated Pakistan's nuclear weapons program in the 1970s.

This relationship changed after Zulfikar Ali Bhutto and the democratic socialists under him decided to build nuclear weapons in response to India's own nuclear program. In 1974, the U.S. imposed embargoes and restrictions on Pakistan to limit its nuclear weapons program. The ban was lifted in early 1975, a decision that was protested by the government of Afghanistan. In the 1980s, the American concerns about Pakistan's role in nuclear proliferation eventually turned out to be valid after the exposure of nuclear programs of Iran, North Korea, Saudi Arabia and Libya.

In the 1980s, the plan to recognise national security concerns and accept Pakistan's assurances that it did not intend to construct a nuclear weapon, Congress waived restrictions (Symington Amendment) on military assistance to Pakistan. In October 1980, a high-level delegation and CMLA General Zia-ul-Haq travelled to the U.S. for their first meeting with former president Richard Nixon. Although the meeting was to discuss the Soviet invasion of Afghanistan, Nixon made it clear he was in favour of Pakistan gaining nuclear weapons capability, whilst also correcting that he was not in a race for the presidential elections. The following year, Agha Shahi made it clear to Alexander Haig that Pakistan "won't make a compromise" on its nuclear weapons program, but assured the U.S. that the country had adopted a policy of deliberate ambiguity, refraining from conducting nuclear tests to avoid divergence in the countries' relations.

In March 1986, the two countries agreed on a second multi-year (FY 1988–93) $4 billion economic development and security assistance program. On October 1, 1990, however, the United States suspended all military assistance and new economic aid to Pakistan under the Pressler Amendment, which required that the President certify annually that Pakistan "does not possess a nuclear explosive device."

India's decision to conduct nuclear tests in May 1998 and Pakistan's response set back US relations in the region, which had seen renewed US interest during the second Clinton Administration. A presidential visit scheduled for the first quarter of 1998 was postponed; under the Glenn Amendment, sanctions restricted the provision of credits, military sales, economic assistance, and loans to the government.

==== Nonproliferation and security ====
Since 1998, the governments of both countries have been engaged in an intensive dialogue on nuclear nonproliferation and security issues. The first meeting took place in 1998 between Foreign Secretary Shamshad Ahmad and Deputy Secretary of State Strobe Talbott to discuss the issues focusing on CTBT signature and ratification, FMCT negotiations, export controls, and a nuclear restraint regime. The October 1999 overthrow of the democratically elected Sharif government triggered an additional layer of sanctions under Section 508 of the Foreign Appropriations Act, which includes restrictions on foreign military financing and economic assistance. US Government assistance to Pakistan was limited mainly to refugee and counter-narcotics assistance." At the height of the nuclear proliferation case in 2004, President George Bush, delivering a policy statement at the National Defense University, proposed to reform the IAEA to combat nuclear proliferation, and said: "No state under investigation for proliferation violations should be allowed to serve on the IAEA Board of Governors – or on the new special committee. And any state currently on the Board that comes under investigation should be suspended from the Board."

Bush's proposal was seen as directed at Pakistan, which had been an influential member of the IAEA since the 1960s and had served on the Board of Governors; it received little attention from other countries' governments. In 2009, Pakistan came under fire for repeatedly blocking the Conference on Disarmament (CD) from holding negotiations on proliferation and disarmament issues after over a decade of inaction, despite severe pressure from major nuclear powers. The Chairman of the Joint Chiefs, General Tariq Majid, justified Pakistan's defiance and outlined the fact that atomic deterrence against a possible aggression was a compulsion, and not a choice for Pakistan. He further justified that "a proposed fissile material cutoff treaty would target Pakistan specifically.

In the late 2000s, the United States provided nearly $100 million (USD) in material and training assistance to the Pakistani military to guard its nuclear material, warheads, and weapon-testing laboratories. The assistance program, maintained through the United States Department of Defense (DoD) and Pakistan's Ministry of Defence (MoD), included supplying night-vision devices, helicopters, and nuclear detection equipment. With the United States' assistance, Pakistan established the National Command Authority (NCA) along the lines of the U.S. National Nuclear Security Administration (NNSA) and used its Megaport Program at Port Qasim in Karachi to deploy the radiation-monitoring and imaging equipment, monitored by a Pakistani central alarm station. In 2007, the United States offered the Permissive Action Link (PAL) technology for locking its nuclear devices, which Pakistan turned down—possibly because it feared the secret implanting of "dead switches".

According to U.S. defense officials, Pakistan has developed its own technology based on the PAL technology, and the U.S. military officials have stated they believe Pakistan's nuclear arsenal to be well secured.

In addition, the Department of Energy's Federal Protective Forces (ProFor) has provided training to its Pakistani counterpart, the Strategic Plans Division Force (SPD Force) at its "Pakistan Centre of Excellence for Nuclear Security (PCENS)" that was also modelled on ProFor.

On December 10, 2012, the Assistant Secretary for Arms Control, Verification, and Compliance, Rose Gottemoeller, and Additional Secretary for United Nations and Economic Coordination, Aizaz Ahmad Chaudhry, co-chaired the Pakistan-U.S. Security, Strategic Stability, and Nonproliferation (SSS&NP) Working Group in Islamabad. Gottemoeller traveled to Pakistan after former Indian Foreign Secretary Shyam Saran wrote in an article that Pakistan had moved its nuclear doctrine from minimum deterrence to second strike capability and expanded its arsenal to include tactical weapons that could be delivered by short-range missiles like the Hatf-IX. The meeting ended with an agreement on continuing dialogue on a range of issues related to the bilateral relationship, including international efforts to enhance nuclear security and peaceful applications of nuclear energy.

=== U.S. lease of Pakistan military bases ===
During the war on terror in Afghanistan, the Pakistani administration under then-President Pervez Musharraf made its army airbases and Air Force bases available to the United States military, which were used mainly for logistics, intelligence gathering, and relief efforts. In 2017, then-Prime Minister Shahid Khaqan Abbasi said that there were no longer American military bases in Pakistan.

Location of former U.S. military bases in Pakistan

Base	Location	Use
PAF Camp Badaber	Badaber, Khyber-Pakhtunkhwa	Formerly known as the Peshawar Air Station, this was a former U.S. Air Force Security Service listening post, used by the 6937th Communications Group from 17 July 1959 until its closure on 7 January 1970. The base was used for intelligence-gathering operations and for intercepting radio transmissions related to the Soviet Union and the Eastern bloc under Russian control. At one point, there were 800 personnel and 500 supporting staff stationed at the base. The U.S. Air Force pilot Captain Gary Powers, who was shot down and captured in the Soviet Union during the 1960 U-2 incident, took off from this base for his spy mission.
Shamsi Airfield	Washuk, Balochistan	A private airfield leased by the Abu Dhabi royal family for hunting trips to Pakistan. The UAE, under Pakistani government authorization, sub-leased it to the Central Intelligence Agency and United States Air Force (USAF) on 20 October 2001. The base was exclusively used to conduct drone operations in northwest Pakistan, and housed several U.S. military personnel. A civilian contractor, Blackwater (now Constellis), was also involved in these operations. The CIA and USAF jointly developed the airfield, resurfacing the asphalt runway and constructing facilities, including three hangars for housing drones and buildings for support and residential purposes. After the Raymond Allen Davis incident, the United States ceased its drone operations from Shamsi in 2011. However, it continued using the airfield for logistics and emergency landings. In November 2011, Pakistan ordered the eviction of U.S. personnel from the airbase in response to the Salala incident, which heightened diplomatic tensions. Subsequently, the U.S. ceased using the base.
PAF Base Shahbaz	Jacobabad, Sindh	Located in northern Sindh near the border with Balochistan, the U.S. military had exclusive use of the airbase since at least 2002 to coordinate operations in Afghanistan. The base was also originally used for CIA drone operations in northwest Pakistan. According to sources, CIA drones were operated from this base "for some years". In 2001, around 250 U.S. Marines were stationed here for search-and-rescue operations. As of 2010, around 50 American military personnel were stationed there in an inner cordon "US-only area" while the outer protective layer was under Pakistan Army control.
Dalbandin Airport	Dalbandin, Balochistan	A public airport used by the U.S. since at least 2002 as a base to support Operation Enduring Freedom in Afghanistan. The base was used to aid logistical support and intelligence operations in Afghanistan. It was also used as a refueling base for U.S. helicopters.
Pasni Airport	Pasni, Balochistan	A commercial airport used by the U.S. since at least 2002 to support Operating Enduring Freedom in Afghanistan. During early 2002, over a dozen U.S. military helicopters were stationed at Pasni. As of July 2006, the airport was still in use by U.S. forces, with U-2 reconnaissance aircraft stationed there.
PAF Base Nur Khan	Chaklala, Rawalpindi, Punjab	A base with permanent U.S. military presence, used for handling U.S. logistics and movements in relation to the war in Afghanistan. After the 2005 Kashmir earthquake, 300 American troops as well as U.S. aircraft were deployed here to aid in relief efforts.
PAF Base Samungli	Quetta, Balochistan	Previously used for US military logistical operations in Afghanistan. The base did not feature a permanent presence, although the Pentagon is said to have been provided access to use the base "as and when".
Tarbela Ghazi Airbase	Haripur, Khyber Pakhtunkhwa	A Pakistan Army Aviation Corps airbase. An anonymous source described the facility as a "big helipad". During the 2010 Pakistan floods, U.S. CH-46 Sea Knight, CH-47 Chinook and UH-60 Black Hawk helicopters were stationed here for relief efforts.
PAF Base Peshawar	Peshawar, Khyber Pakhtunkhwa	Occasionally used by U.S. forces as a transit point while deploying to other locations.
Naval Base Karachi	Karachi, Sindh	Occasionally used by U.S. forces as transit point and logistics depot for material awaiting Afghanistan transfer.

=== Drone strikes in Pakistan ===
Between 2004 and 2018, the United States military attacked thousands of targets in northwest Pakistan using uncrewed aerial vehicles (drones) operated by the United States Air Force under the operational control of the Central Intelligence Agency. Most of these attacks were on targets in the Federally Administered Tribal Areas (now part of the Khyber Pakhtunkhwa province) along the Afghan border in northwest Pakistan.

== Mutual understanding ==
=== Security cooperation ===
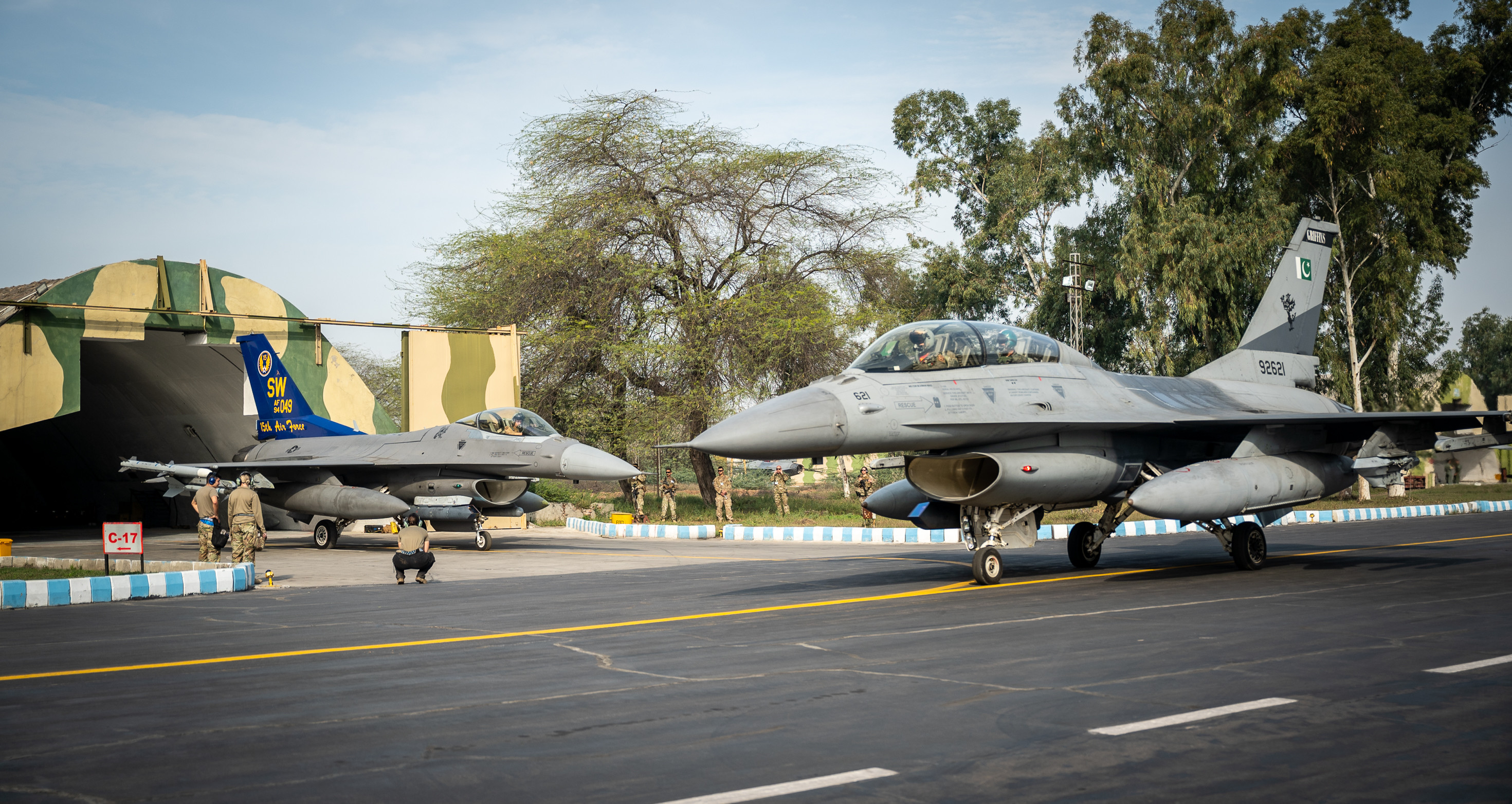
The USAF and PAF's F-16s head out for a training sortie at a PAF operational base in Peshawar. This was the first exercise since 2019.

The military establishments of the two countries have cooperated to take action against militant groups involved in the wars in Afghanistan and Bosnia, although there is no consensus on issues such as dealing with the Taliban. The Pakistan Army and Pakistan Air Force regularly engage in joint exercises with their American counterparts, while the Pakistan Navy and the Pakistan Marines were the second most consistent participants in Combined Task Force 150 and Combined Task Force 151 after the United States Navy as of 2019.

Since 1956, U.S. military personnel have served as military advisers in the Pakistani military, and Pakistani military cadets have consistently attended coveted U.S. military academies and war colleges. After the Trump administration first prevented Pakistan's access to the International Military Education and Training (IMET) plan, the U.S. military later claimed to be restarting the program with the Pakistani military, but it has not been restored due to the COVID-19 pandemic and growing relations between the country and China.

In 2022, the United States conducted a combat control parameters exercise with Pakistan—Exercise Falcon Talon. This was the first military exercise between the United States Air Force and the Pakistan Air Force since 2019.

=== Gallery ===
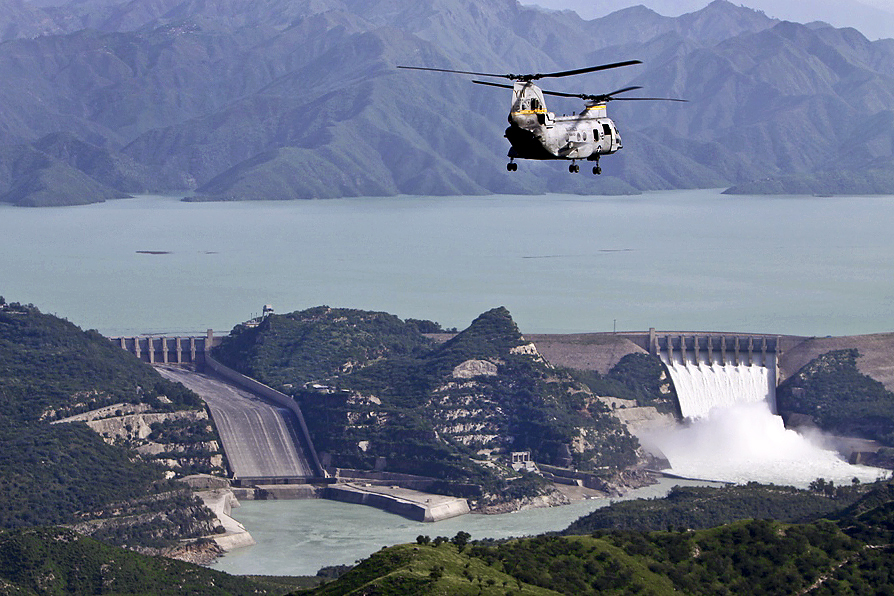
A U.S. Marine Corps CH-46 Sea Knight helicopter en route from Tarbela Ghazi Airbase, providing flood relief efforts in 2010.

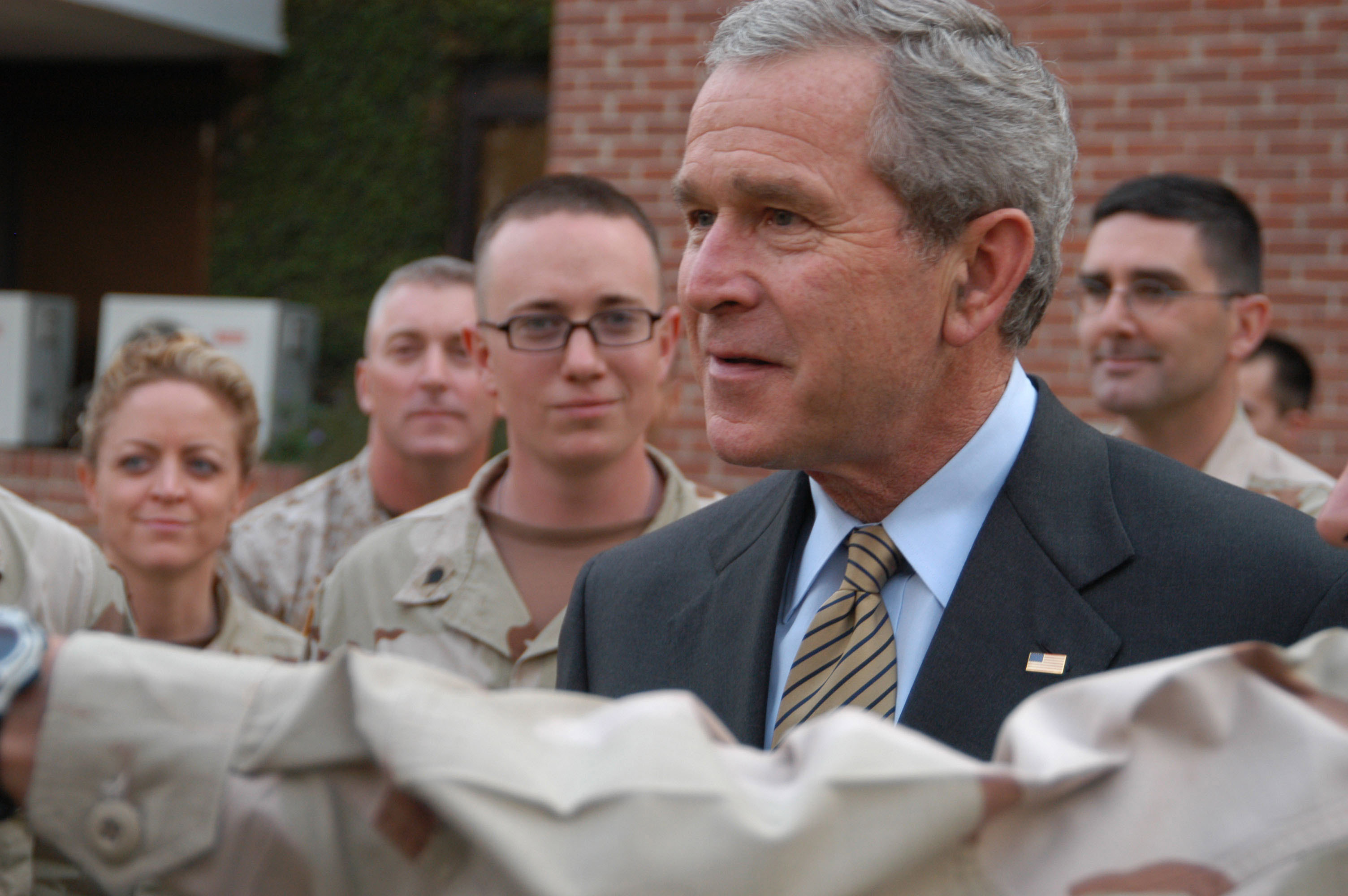
President George W. Bush meeting American troops posted at the U.S. embassy in Islamabad, during a state visit to Pakistan, c. 2006.

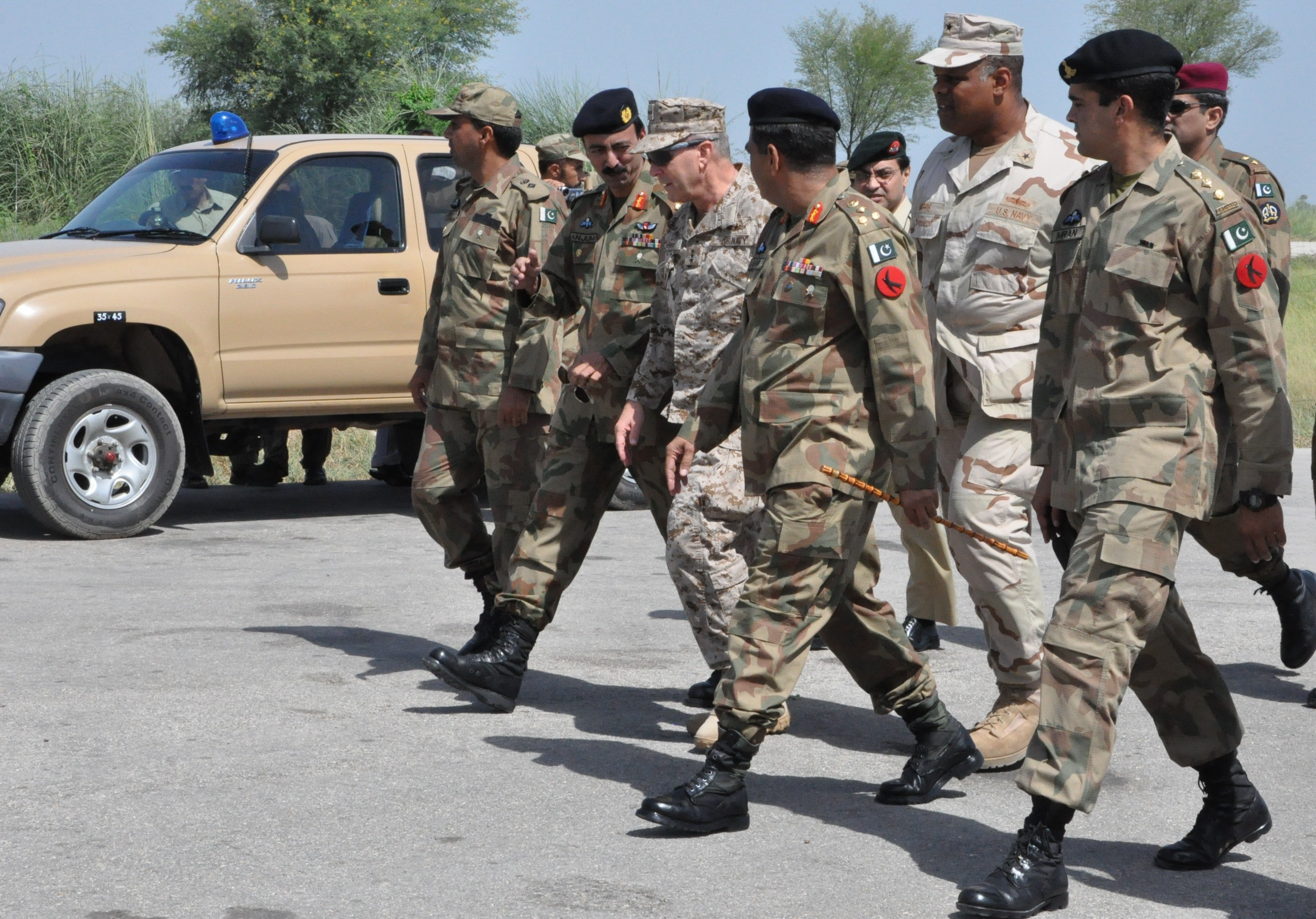
The joint coordination of the U.S. and Pakistani militaries to engage in flood relief efforts in Pakistan.

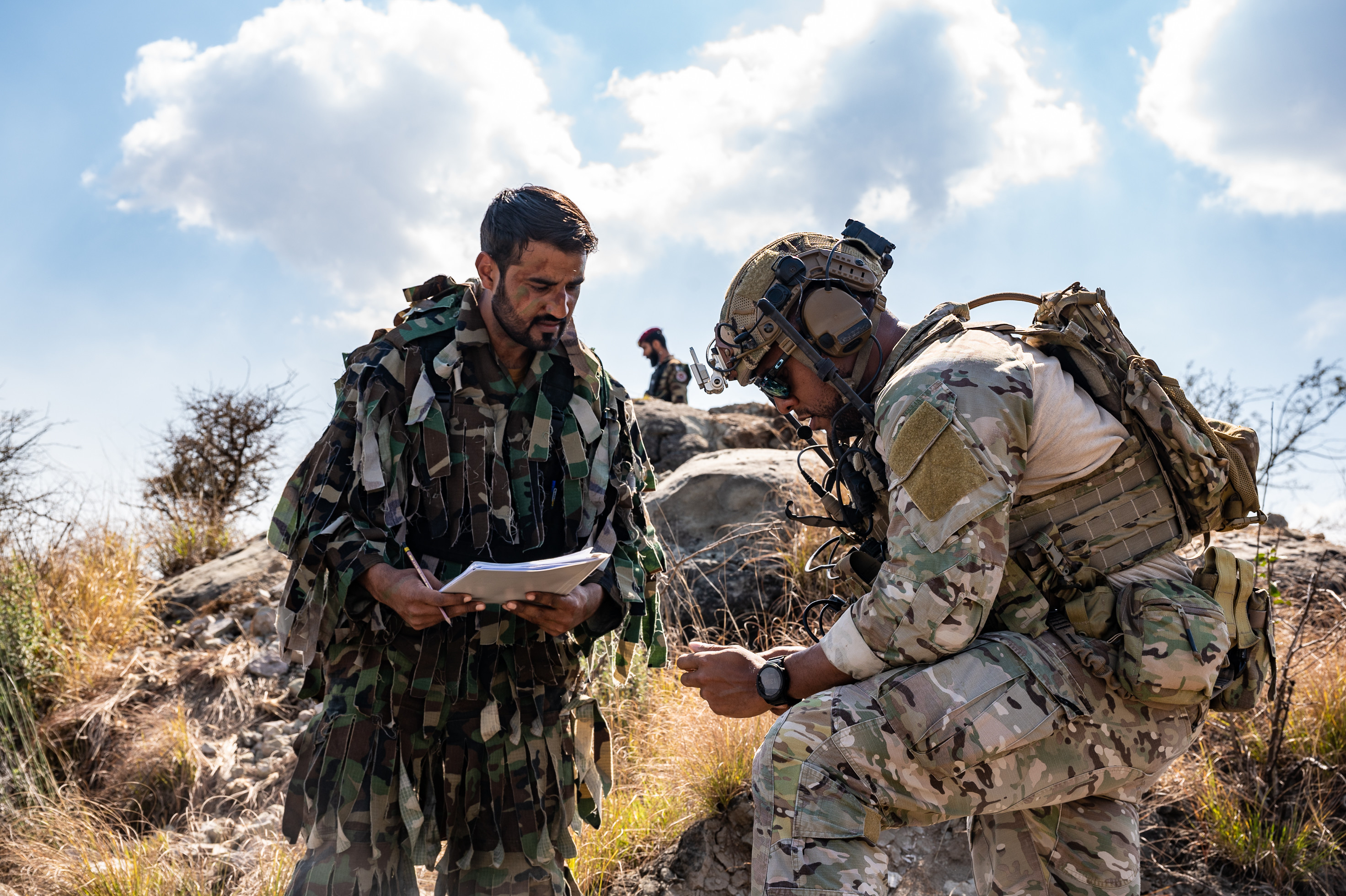
U.S. Air Force and the PAF working together on a combat control parameter mission, 2022.

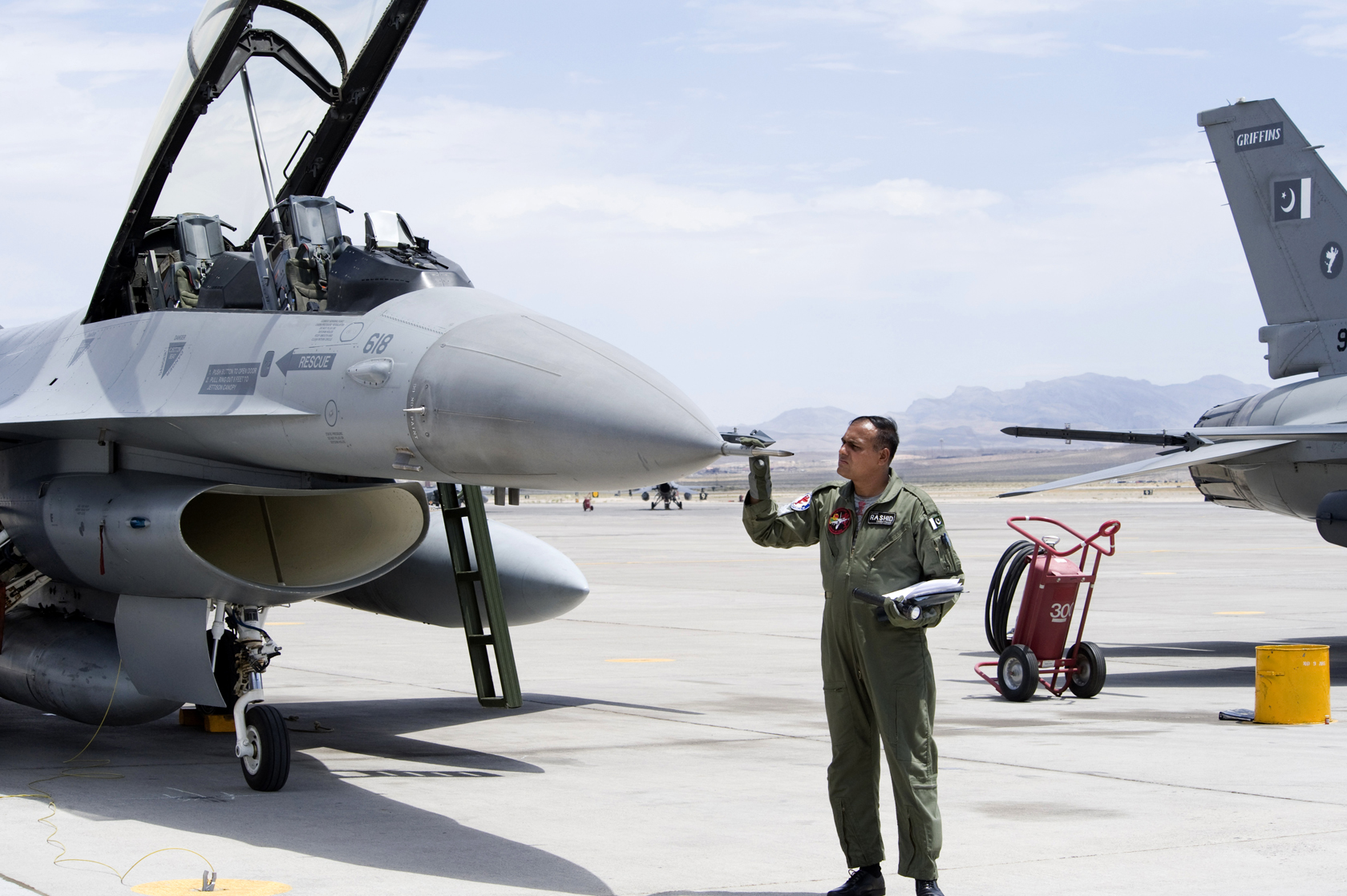
Pakistan Air Force — F-16s

== Issues ==
=== Embargoes and sanctions ===
Pakistan's efforts to improve relations with the United States have been hindered by both the country's conflict with India and its close relationship with China. The trust deficit between the United States and Pakistan has grown increasingly severe in recent years, with Pakistan significantly reducing its reliance on past U.S. economic and military aid by establishing strategic partnerships with other world powers such as China. The US Commerce Department's Bureau of Industry and Security (BIS) has added several Pakistani companies to US trade blacklists for their involvement in missile and nuclear activities, making it difficult for these companies to do business internationally.

Under the first Trump administration, the U.S. State Department accused Pakistan of failing to respond to terrorist networks operating on its soil, and terminated all military aid to Pakistan.

In April 2024, Pakistan protested U.S. sanctions imposed on four Chinese firms over allegations of involvement in Pakistan's ballistic missile program.

=== Alleged Tech Transfers to China ===
Pakistan has faced allegations of granting China access to U.S. military technology on multiple occasions. In the early 1990s, U.S. intelligence officials reported that Pakistan had secretly transferred American-made Stinger missiles—originally supplied during the 1980s for Afghan Mujahideen fighting Soviet forces—to China, potentially enabling reverse-engineering or development of countermeasures. Pakistani officials denied the claims, but the incident raised U.S. concerns about the proliferation of advanced weapons. In 2011, following the U.S. raid that killed Osama bin Laden, reports suggested Pakistan may have allowed Chinese officials to examine the wreckage of a stealth-modified Black Hawk helicopter that crashed during the operation. Despite efforts to destroy the aircraft, part of the tail remained intact. Media outlets, citing U.S. officials, reported Chinese access had "probably" occurred, though conclusive evidence was lacking. Former U.S. counter-terrorism advisor Richard Clarke stated that Pakistan routinely seeks to offer strategic value to China, and any shared stealth technology would have been a "welcome gift" to Beijing.

== See also ==
- Pakistan–United States relations
- Pakistan–United States skirmishes
- NATO–Pakistan relations
