= Musa Keligov =

Russian politician (born 1963)

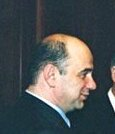
- Keligov in 2002

Russian Federation Senator from the Republic of Ingushetia
- In office March – May 2010
- President: Vladimir Putin

The deputy presidential envoy in the Southern Federal District

Personal details
- Born: 16 March 1963 (age 63) Malgobek, Chechen-Ingush Autonomous Soviet Socialist Republic, USSR
- Children: Four
- Education: Moscow State University of Food Production, Moscow State Academy of Technologies
- Profession: politician
- Awards: Order of the Red Star, Medal "For Courage"

Musa Bamatovich Keligov (Note: Russian: Муса́ Бама́тович Ке́лигов, Ingush: Келиганаькъан Бамата Муса, romanized: Keliganäqhan Bamata Musa) (born 16 March 16, 1963) is a Russian politician and former vice-president of "Lukoil-International".

In 2010, he was elected to the upper house of Russia's parliament.

== Biography ==
Musa Keligov was born on March 16, 1963, in Malgobek (Chechen-Ingush Autonomous Soviet Socialist Republic).

From 1984 to 1986, he participated in combat operations in Afghanistan as part of the Soviet Union's army intelligence unit (in the 180th Motorized Rifle Regiment - according to the "Kommersant" newspaper). He served his military service in this regiment, commanded by Ruslan Aushev, the future President of Ingushetia. He was seriously wounded in the battle.

He worked as an engineer. In 1989-1991 he served as a deputy of the Supreme Soviet of the Chechen-Ingush Autonomous Soviet Socialist Republic.

From 1991 to 1994, he then served as the Deputy Chairman of the Committee for the soldiers-internationalists (first under the President of the USSR, and then to the Council of Heads of Government of the countries - participants of the CIS).

Keligov graduated from the Moscow State University of Food Production, and the Moscow State Academy of Technologies. In 1998 he defended his PhD thesis on "The food market of Russia and its influence on the character of the development of the domestic food production".

According to the Kommersant newspaper, in 1999, during the Second Chechen War, Keligov organized a military operation against Chechen terrorists who had taken his brother, Magomed Keligov, hostage. The operation resulted in the release of the hostages and the elimination of militant group and its leader.

In 1994-2000 (according to other sources - in 1993) he served as the vice-president of "Lukoil-International".

From April 2000 to February 2001 Keligov served as the Deputy Head of the Administration of the Nenets Autonomous District.

From 2001 to 2002 he served as the chief federal inspector of the Plenipotentiary Representative of the President of the Russian Federation in the Republic of Ingushetia, then as the deputy presidential envoy in the Southern Federal District.

In 2002, there was a plot to assassinate Musa Keligov. The attempt fell through, and one of the intermediaries between the people who ordered the assassination and the killer was caught.

Since 2004 Keligov has served as president of the "Ingrosso" company.

In 2010 he was elected a member of the Federation Council of the People's Assembly of the Republic of Ingushetia.

== Criticism ==
Musa Keligov has been criticized for his assistance to Murat Zyazikov in Ingushetia's presidential elections. Keligov himself named the promotion of Zyazikov "the greatest sin" in his life.>

== Personal life ==
Keligov is married and has four children.

== Awards ==
For participation in combat operations in Afghanistan Musa Keligov was awarded the Order of the Red Star and the Medal "For Courage".
