= NA-30 Peshawar-III =

Constituency of the National Assembly of Pakistan

- Constituency for the National Assembly of Pakistan
- District: Badaber Tehsil (partly), Peshtakhara Tehsil (partly), Hassan Khel Tehsil and Peshawar City Tehsil (partly) of Peshawar District
- Province: Khyber Pakhtunkhwa
- Electorate: 404,622

Current constituency
- Created: 2018
- Party: Pakistan Tehreek-e-Insaf
- Member: Shandana Gulzar
- Created from: NA-2 Peshawar-II; NA-3 Peshawar-III; NA-4 Peshawar-IV

NA-30 Peshawar-III (این اے-30، پشاور-٣) is a constituency for the National Assembly of Pakistan.

== Area ==
During the delimitation of 2018, NA-29 (Peshawar-III) acquired areas from three former constituencies namely NA-2 (Peshawar-II), NA-3 (Peshawar-III), and NA-4 (Peshawar-IV), the areas of Peshawar which are part of this constituency are listed below alongside the former constituency name from which they were acquired:

Areas acquired from NA-2 Peshawar-II

- Qasba (excluding Palusi Attuzai, Palusi Maqadarzai, Palusi Talarzai, Jaba Jungle (Tukra No. 1), and Mahal Salu)

Areas acquired from NA-3 Peshawar-III

- Jaba Jungle (Tukra No. 1)

Areas acquired from NA-4 Peshawar-IV

- Badaber (excluding Sori Zai Payan, Musa Zai and Deh Bahadur)

== Members of Parliament ==
=== 2018–2022: NA-29 Peshawar-III ===
Election	Member	Party
2018	Nasir Khan Yousafzai	PTI

=== 2023–present: NA-30 Peshawar-III ===
Election	Member	Party
2024	Shandana Gulzar	SIC

== 2018 general election ==
General elections were held on 25 July 2018.

General election 2018: NA-29 (Peshawar-III)
Party	Candidate	Votes	%	±%
PTI	Nasir Khan Musazai	49,762	39.64	
MMA	Naeem Jan	29,357	23.38	
ANP	Arbab Kamal Ahmed Khan	20,392	16.24	
PML(N)	Amir Muqam	15,458	12.31	
TLP	Muhammad Shafeeq	10,569	8.42	
Turnout		130,157	40.62	
Total valid votes		125,538	96.45	
Rejected ballots		4,619	3.55	
Majority		20,405	16.26	
Registered electors		320,401		
PTI win (new seat)				

== 2024 general election ==
General elections were held on 8 February 2024. Shandana Gulzar won the election with 78,971 votes.

General election 2024: NA-30 Peshawar-III
Party	Candidate	Votes	%	±%
PTI	Shandana Gulzar (Note: Filed nomination papers as PTI candidate but ECP allowed her to run as an Independent)	78,971	59.83	▲20.19
JUI (F)	Nasir Khan Musazai	20,950	15.87	N/A
ANP	Zain Umar Arbab	11,855	8.98	▼7.26
Others	Others (twelve candidates)	20,219	15.32	
Turnout		136,766	33.80	▼6.82
Total valid votes		131,995	96.51	
Rejected ballots		4,771	3.49	
Majority		58,021	43.96	▲27.7
Registered electors		404,622		

== See also ==
- NA-29 Peshawar-II
- NA-31 Peshawar-IV
