= Nasir Khan Musazai =

Pakistani politician

Member of the National Assembly of Pakistan
- In office 13 August 2018 – 10 August 2023
- Constituency: NA-29 (Peshawar-III)

Personal details
- Born: Peshawar, Khyber Pakhtunkhwa, Pakistan
- Party: JUI (F) (2023-present)
- Other political affiliations: PTI (2018-2023); PMLN (2013-2018)

Nasir Khan Musazai is a Pakistani politician who had been a member of the National Assembly of Pakistan from August 2018 till August 2023.

== Political career ==
He contested the 2013 election from NA-4 Peshawar-IV as a candidate of the Pakistan Muslim League (N) (PML(N)), but was unsuccessful. He received 20,412 votes and was defeated by Gulzar Khan, a candidate of the Pakistan Tehreek-e-Insaf (PTI).

He contested a by-election in NA-4 Peshawar-IV as a candidate of the PML(N), but was unsuccessful. He received 24,790 votes and was defeated by Arbab Amir Ayub, a candidate of the PTI.

On 14 April 2018, Musazai met with Imran Khan, the chairman of the PTI, and joined the party.

He was elected to the National Assembly of Pakistan as a candidate of the PTI from NA-29 Peshawar-III in the 2018 Pakistani general election. He received 49,762 votes and defeated Mufti Naeem Jaan, a candidate of Muttahida Majlis-e-Amal (MMA).

He had become one of 20 PTI dissidents in the National Assembly ahead of the no-confidence motion against Imran Khan.

On 15 January 2023, addressing a public gathering with Fazal-ur-Rehman, he announced that he had joined the Jamiat Ulema-e-Islam (F) (JUI(F)).
