= Terrorism in Pakistan =

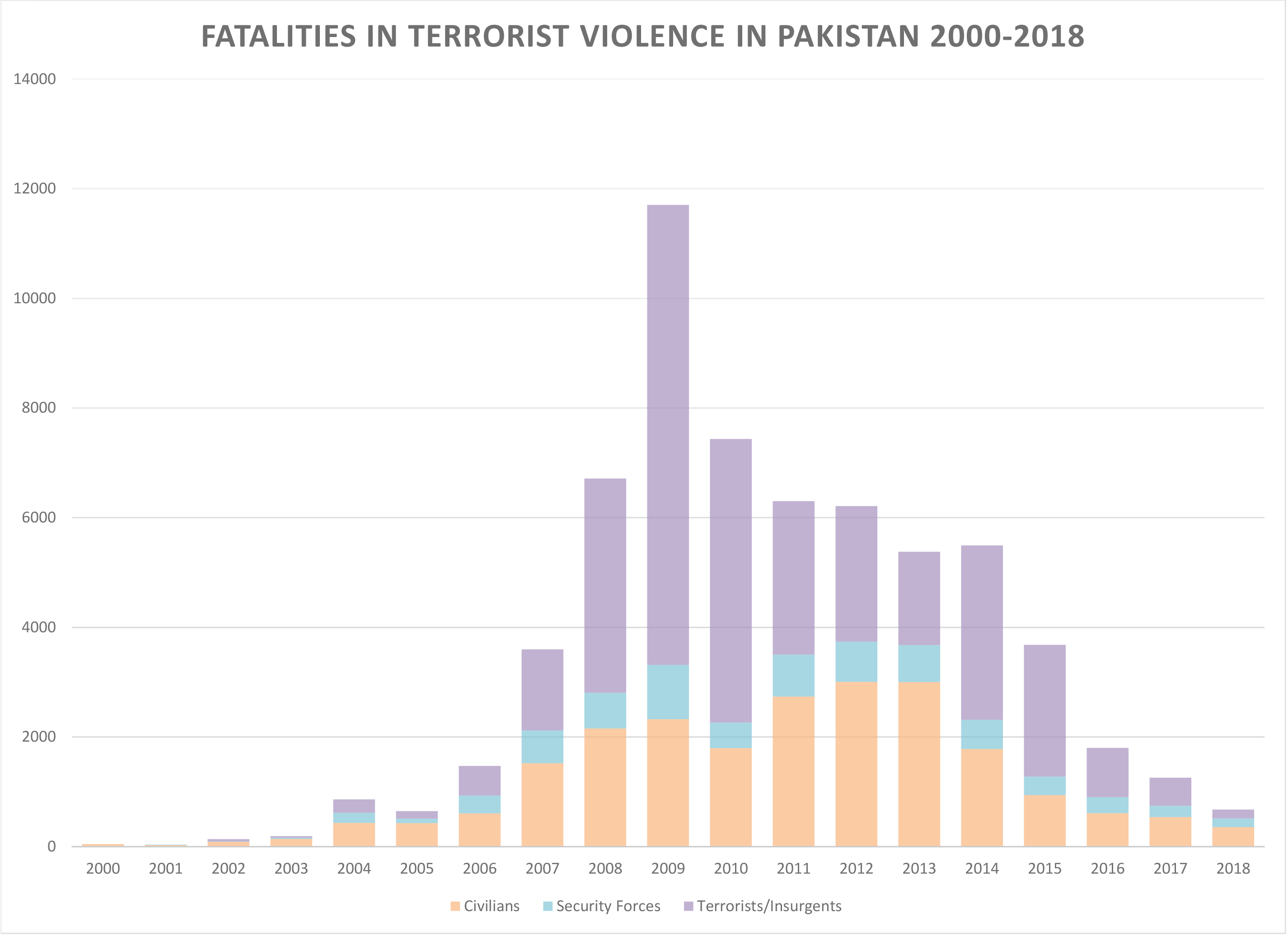
Fatalities in terrorist violence in Pakistan, (2000–2018)

Terrorism in Pakistan, according to the Ministry of Interior, poses a significant threat to the people of Pakistan. The wave of terrorism in Pakistan is believed to have started in 2000. Attacks and fatalities in Pakistan were on a "declining trend" between 2015 and 2019, but has gone back up from 2020 to 2022, with 971 fatalities (229 civilians, 379 Security Force (SF) personnel and 363 terrorists) in 2022.

Since 2001, the Pakistan military has launched a series of military offensives against terrorist groups in the Federally Administered Tribal Areas (FATA). The offensive brought peace in those areas and the rest of the country. Many terrorists belonging to various terrorist groups were killed. However, some militants managed to flee to Afghanistan. From Afghanistan, those militants continue to launch attacks on Pakistan military posts located near the border. In 2017, Afghanistan's Chief Executive Abdullah Abdullah admitted that Tehrik-i-Taliban Pakistan (TTP) has a foothold in Afghanistan. In 2019, the United States Department of Defense claimed that about 3,000 to 5,000 terrorists belonging to TTP are in Afghanistan.

According to a report by Brown University's Watson Institute for International and Public Affairs, 23,372 Pakistani civilians and 8,832 Pakistani security personnel were killed in the war on terrorism. Moreover, according to the Government of Pakistan, the direct and indirect economic costs of terrorism from 2000 to 2010 total $68 billion. In 2018, Pakistani newspaper Dawn News reported that the Pakistani economy suffered a total loss of $126.79 billion since 2001 due to the war on terror.

Pakistan officials often blame India and Afghanistan for supporting terrorism in Pakistan. India has denied Pakistan's allegations. However, Afghanistan has admitted to providing support for terrorist groups such as Tehrik-i-Taliban Pakistan (TTP). In 2013, the United States conducted a raid on an Afghan convoy that was taking Latif Mehsud to Kabul. Latif was a senior commander of Tehrik-i-Taliban Pakistan (TTP). Afghan President's spokesperson, Aimal Faizi, told reporters that the National Directorate of Security (NDS) was working with Latif. Latif was a conduit for funding to TTP. Some of the funding for TTP might have come from NDS. Former NDS head Asadullah Khalid posted a video belonging to TTP on his Twitter account where he claimed that the Badaber Camp attack was tit for tat.

As of 2022, most terrorist activities in Pakistan have been concentrated in the provinces of Khyber Pakhtunkhwa and Balochistan. Khyber Pakhtunkhwa accounting for 64 percent of the reported casualties (633 fatalities in 2022), followed by 26 percent in Balochistan, 5.8 percent in Sindh and 2.8 percent in Punjab.

Counterterrorism and countering violent extremism have contributed to reducing terrorism in Pakistan.

== Causes ==
The roots of terrorism in Pakistan can be traced back to 1979 when Soviet Union had occupied Afghanistan. Terrorism in Pakistan originated after Pakistan supported the Afghan mujahideen during the Soviet–Afghan War, and the subsequent civil war that erupted in Afghanistan. The mujahideen fighters were trained by Pakistan's military, American CIA and other western intelligence agencies who continued operations in the area after the war officially ended.

David B. Edwards, a Williams College anthropology professor with expertise in the development of Islamic militancy in Afghanistan and Pakistan, noted that Pakistan’s military intelligence service initially supported the Taliban insurgency but later ended up combating it, remarking that "they (Pakistan) created their own 'Frankenstein', and they thought they could control them."

=== Afghanistan ===
In a report published by the Defence Ministry, It said that the incidents of terrorism in Pakistan had seen an increase in 2023 compared to 2018 and 2021 after the US withdrawal from Afghanistan. The subsequent takeover of Afghanistan by the Afghan Taliban was followed by the release of 1500 TTP militants from Afghan jails.

Afghanistan was identified to give unchecked and ungovernable spaces for freedom of movement for multiple anti Pakistan terrorist groups such as the TTP, JUA, BLA, BNA, BLF and ISIS–K settled and operating along the Pak-Afghan border.

=== Alleged Indian Involvement ===
In 2017, Kulbhushan Jadhav, an Indian national was arrested in March 2016 by Pakistani authorities and charged with espionage and sabotage. He was accused of operating a covert terror network within Balochistan. According to them, he was a serving Indian Navy officer who was arrested from Balochistan. The Pakistani military released a video of Jadhav in which he confessed that he was tasked by India’s intelligence agency, the Research and Analysis Wing (RAW), to plan and organise espionage and sabotage activities in Balochistan and Karachi.

However, India responded that he was an ex - Indian Navy serviceman, and had been abducted by Pakistan from Iran and wrongfully detained for three weeks without informing the Indian consulate. He was subsequently sentenced to death by a military court in what India called would be "premediated murder". Pakistan also denied consular access to Jadhav, until the International Court of Justice intervened, by placing a stay the death sentence and forcing Pakistan "to cease internationally wrongful acts of a continuing character".

In November 2020, the Foreign Office of Pakistan made public a dossier allegedly containing 'irrefutable proofs' of Indian sponsorship of terrorism in Pakistan. It allegedly contained proof of India's financial and material sponsorship of multiple terrorist organisations, including UN-designated terrorist organisations Jamaat-ul-Ahrar, Balochistan Liberation Army and Tehreek-i-Taliban Pakistan.

== War on terrorism ==
The current wave of terrorism peaked during 2009. Since then it has declined as result of selective military operations conducted by the Pakistan Army. According to South Asian Terrorism Portal Index (SATP), terrorism in Pakistan has declined by 89% in 2017 since its peak years in 2009.

In 2012, the Pakistani leadership sat down to sort out solutions for dealing with the menace of terrorism and in 2013, political parties unanimously reached a resolution on Monday 9 September 2013, at the All Parties Conference (APC), stating that negotiation with the militants should be pursued as their first option to counter terrorism.

With the terrorists attacks continuing in late 2013 the political leadership in Pakistan initiated a military operation against terrorists named Operation Zarb-e-Azb; a joint military offensive against various militant groups, including the Tehrik-i-Taliban Pakistan (TTP), Lashkar-e-Jhangvi, Jundallah, al-Qaeda, the East Turkestan Islamic Movement (ETIM), the Islamic Movement of Uzbekistan (IMU) and the Haqqani network. The operation was launched by the Pakistan Armed Forces on 15 June 2014 in North Waziristan (part of the Federally Administered Tribal Areas along the Afghan border) as a renewed effort against militancy in the wake of the 8 June attack on Jinnah International Airport in Karachi, for which the TTP and the IMU claimed responsibility.

Operation Zarb-e-Azb has been described as turning point in Pakistan war on terrorism. The operation was successful and Pakistan experienced sharp decline in terrorism since the launch of the operation. According to National Counter Terrorism Authority (Nacta), Pakistan experienced largest number of terrorist attack in 2010. Since 2014, terrorist attacks in Pakistan have significantly declined. Pakistani officials state that the terrorism in Pakistan will decline more once the fencing of Pakistan-Afghanistan border is complete.

Pakistani newspaper, Dawn news, reports that Pakistan's economic losses due to war on terrorism declined by 62% from 2014 to 2018. The Pakistani economy suffered $23.77 billion in 2010-11 due to expenses related to war on terrorism. This amount declined to $12 billion in 2011-12. In 2016-17, Pakistan economy suffered $5.47 billion and $2.07 billion on 2017-18. Pakistani government estimates that Pakistan has suffered total losses of $126.79 billion since 9/11 attacks.

Afghan President's spokesperson, Aimal Faizi, told reporters that the National Directorate of Security (NDS) was working with Latif. Latif was conduit for funding to TTP. Some of the funding for TTP might have come from NDS. Former NDS head, Asadullah Khalid, posted a video belonging to TTP on his Twitter account where he claimed that Badaber Camp attack was tit for tat.

Thousands of people participated in peace rallies in different towns in Khyber Pakhtunkhwa province of Pakistan, condemning the recent attack on the Malik Saad Shaheed Police Lines in Peshawar and the resurgence of militancy in the province. The participants demanded that the government eliminate militancy and ensure sustainable peace. The rallies were attended by prominent leaders, including Manzoor Pashteen of the Pashtun Tahaffuz Movement (PTM) and Sardar Hussain Babak of the Awami National Party.

== See also ==
- Operation Zarb-e-Azb
- Operation Radd-ul-Fasaad
- War on terror
- Pakistan in the war on terror
- Insurgency in Khyber Pakhtunkhwa
- Insurgency in Balochistan
- Sectarian violence in Pakistan
- Anti-China terrorism in Pakistan
- Rangers Anti-Terrorism Wing
- Pakistan and state-sponsored terrorism

== Bibliography ==
- Hassan Abbas. Pakistan's Drift Into Extremism: Allah, The Army, And America's War On Terror, M.E. Sharpe, 2004. ISBN 0-7656-1497-9
- Zahid Hussain. Frontline Pakistan: The Struggle with Militant Islam, New York: Columbia University Press, 2007. ISBN 0-231-14224-2
