= PAF Camp Badaber =

Pakistan Air Force base

Coordinates: 33.9579°N 71.5737°E

PAF Camp Badaber, formerly known as Peshawar Air Station, is a non-flying air force base of the Pakistan Air Force and a former United States Air Force–Central Intelligence Agency listening post, used by the 6937th Communications Group from July 17, 1959 until being evacuated on 7 January 1970, when the facility was formally closed. It was located in Badaber, about 4 miles (6.4 km) south of the city of Peshawar, Pakistan. However, since 2021, sixty-five U.S. Air Force personnel have been stationed at Camp Badaber.

== Project Sand Bag ==
In 1955, the United States Air Force started to survey various locations in West Pakistan for a radio intercept site. At that time, the US was interested in radio transmission intercepts from the Soviet Union. The survey team recommended the site be located near Peshawar in West Pakistan. Its final location was in Badaber, a remote area about 4 miles (6.4 km) south of the city of Peshawar, Pakistan. Creating the site would be known as project Sand Bag.

== Facilities ==
The United States established permission from Ayub Khan the President of the Pakistan government with the establishment of a 10-year lease of the property. Construction of the Peshawar Air Station started in 1958. Known as "Little USA", The air station was divided into two areas: the administration buildings, barracks, dining hall, movie theater, and a gym. The operations compound included housing for the specialized listening equipment. Later construction added a bowling alley, golf course, base housing for dependent family members, and a DoDDS school.

Staff at the air base grew to about 800 personnel. An additional 500 support personnel provided other services such as mail handling, cooks, chaplains, teachers, etc.

In September 1965, the tensions between India and Pakistan peaked. Construction crews built bomb shelters in the back yards of all family housing units for protection.

== Commanders ==
- Col Ethyl Branham, Apr 58 – Apr 59
- Col Long, Apr 59 – Apr 60
- Col Julius Spooner, Apr 60 – Jun 61.
- LTC Skinner (acting base commander)
- Col Tom Hanley
- Col Robert Goerder, Jun 61 – July 9, 1963
- Col Thomas C. Hyde, July 9, 1963 – July 4, 1965
- Col Henry Taylor, July 4, 1965 – Jun 67
- Col Graydon K. "Rocky" Eubank, Commander, June 67 – June 69.
- Col Bill Hezlip, Jul 69 – Jul 70

== History ==
Peshawar Air Station was used as the communication station for the ill-fated May 1, 1960 flight of a Lockheed U-2 spy plane, piloted by Gary Powers, which was shot down over the Soviet Union.

The former station was later used as a training camp for Afghan Mujahideen as part of Operation Cyclone, a Central Intelligence Agency-run program to train and arm Afghan Mujahideen to fight against the Soviet Union and the Soviet-supported Democratic Republic of Afghanistan (DRA) in the Soviet–Afghan War, 1979 to 1989. It was the site of the Badaber Uprising of 1985, an armed uprising by Soviet and DRA prisoners of war held captive at the camp.

In December 1983 the Pakistan Air Force moved its Basic Staff School to the installation, which became PAF Camp Badaber. In August, 2007, the In-Service Education Scheme for mid-career officers was revitalized and replaced with Officers' Military Education (OME) in which the whole officers training programme was brought under the administrative and functional control of the Commandant, PAF Air War College. Thus Basic Staff School (BSS) and Junior Command and Staff School (JC&SS) were merged into one institution named as the JC&SS at Camp Badaber.

The camp came under attack by Tehreek-e-Taliban Pakistan militants on 18 September 2015.

== Vocational Institute ==
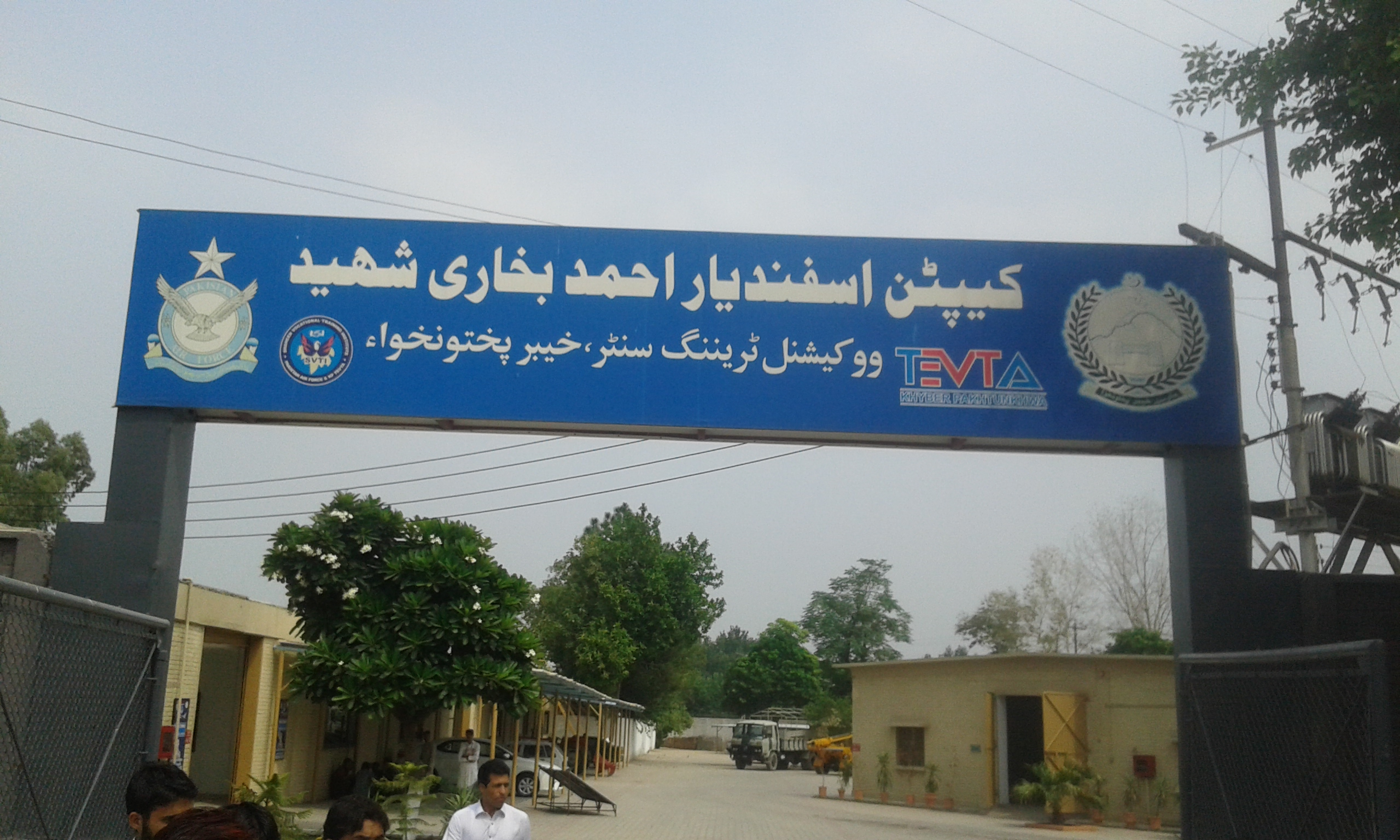
Captain Asfandyar Ahmed Bokhari Shaheed Vocational Training Institute, KPK

Chief Minister Pervez Khattak inaugurated the Captain Isfandyar Ahmad Bukhari Shaheed Vocational Training Centre at the Pakistan Air Force (PAF) Base Badaber on July 14, 2016.

The centre is named in the memory of the Pakistan Army officer who was killed in the 2015 attack.
