= 2015 Camp Badaber attack =

Militant attack in Pakistan

- Part of the War in North-West Pakistan
- Location: 33.9557°N 71.5754°E; Badaber, Khyber Pakhtunkhwa, Pakistan
- Date: 18 September 2015; 11 years ago (Pakistan Standard Time)
- Target: Pakistan Air Force Camp Badaber
- Attack type: Mass shooting
- Deaths: 39 (14 militants, 25 security personnel)
- Injuries: 25
- Perpetrator: Pakistani Taliban
- No. of participants: 14
- Motive: Retaliation for Operation Zarb-e-Azb

The 2015 Camp Badaber attack occurred on 18 September 2015, when 14 Tehrik-i-Taliban Pakistan (TTP) militants attempted to storm Camp Badaber, a Pakistan Air Force base located in Badaber, Khyber Pakhtunkhwa, Pakistan. The attack killed 25–29 security personnel, including Captain Asfandyar Bukhari of the Pakistan Army, who was responding to the attack as part of a quick-reaction force. All 14 militants were killed in combat with Pakistani forces, according to claims by security officials. The attack, claimed by the TTP to be in retaliation for the Pakistan Armed Forces' Operation Zarb-e-Azb, was the first of its kind in its intensity, and the well-armed TTP militants engaged Pakistani forces at Camp Badaber in a protracted battle that resulted in heavier losses than those inflicted in previous attacks on military installations. PAF Camp Badaber is located about 48 kilometres (30 mi) east of the Afghanistan–Pakistan border.

== Background ==
In June 2014, a joint military offensive was conducted by the Pakistan Armed Forces against militant groups operating in North Waziristan, then part of the Federally Administered Tribal Areas, both of which had seen extensive violence in the wake of the War in Afghanistan (post-9/11). The offensive, codenamed Operation Zarb-e-Azb, was launched in the wake of the 2014 Jinnah International Airport attack in Karachi, Sindh, for which the Tehrik-i-Taliban claimed responsibility. The operation is part of the ongoing War in North-West Pakistan, in which more than 42,000 people have been killed.

== Air base ==
PAF Camp Badaber, formerly known as the Peshawar Air Station, is a non-flying airbase of the Pakistan Air Force located in Badaber, a remote area about 6.4 kilometres (4 mi) south of the city of Peshawar in Khyber Pakhtunkhwa. The base served as a former Central Intelligence Agency–United States Air Force Security Service listening post in Western Bloc-allied Pakistan during the Cold War, used by the 6937 Communications Group from 17 July 1959 to 7 January 1970, when the facility was formally closed. Peshawar Air Station served as the launching point for the United States' notoriously ill-fated 1960 U-2 reconnaissance mission into the Soviet Union.

== Attack ==
According to the then director-general of the Inter-Services Public Relations (ISPR), Asim Bajwa, the attack began in the early hours of 18 September 2015, when 14 Tehrik-i-Taliban Pakistan (TTP) militants, armed with automatic weapons and RPGs arrived on Inqalab Road, and after dismounting from their vehicle near PAF Base Badaber, breached the gates and gained entry into the base. Pakistani security forces stationed inside the airbase engaged the terrorists immediately after their infiltration. Following their breach, the militants split into two groups, with one group heading towards the administrative areas in the base while the other group targeted technical military assets. Heavy contingents of military reinforcements were called after an intense gunfight erupted between the terrorists and Pakistani security forces inside the base. A major firefight also took place within the small area of the base which housed its mosque; the militants attacked and opened fire on the personnel inside the mosque for morning prayers, inflicting heavy losses on the Pakistani military. Here, at least 29 people, including 23 airmen, three soldiers and three civilian workers were killed. Captain Asfandyar Bukhari of the Pakistan Army, who was responding to the attack as part of a quick reaction force, was also killed during the attack.

== Aftermath ==
Following the attack, a search operation and aerial surveillance of the base and its surroundings for terrorists were conducted, following which around 15 people were arrested by security forces. General Raheel Sharif, then Chief of Army Staff, visited the wounded Pakistani personnel at the Combined Military Hospital–Peshawar and held meetings with Pakistan Army Corps Commander Lieutenant-General Hidayatur Rehman and Air Chief Marshal Sohail Aman to discuss the attack.

== Responsibility ==
The attack's responsibility was claimed by the Khorasani wing of the Tehrik-i-Taliban Pakistan (TTP). The attack was allegedly executed and coordinated from neighbouring Afghanistan—which further increased existing tensions between Afghanistan and Pakistan. The militants involved in the attack had also reportedly come from Afghanistan per statements made by the director-general of the Inter-Services Public Relations, Asim Bajwa: "The attackers came from Afghanistan and the whole foul play was planned in the neighbouring country. This attack was being executed through direct coordination from Afghanistan as well."

== Reactions ==
- United States – Deputy spokesman of the U.S. State Department Mark Toner, stated: "No country has suffered more at the hands of terrorists and extremists than Pakistan." He termed the attack as "a reprehensible act."
- United Nations – Deputy spokesperson for the UN Secretary-General, Farhan Haq, also condemned the attack. He "offered condolences" to the government and people of Pakistan.

== See also ==
- 2014 Quetta Airbase attack
- PAF Minhas attacks
- PNS Mehran attack
