= NA-29 Peshawar-II =

Constituency of the National Assembly of Pakistan

- Constituency for the National Assembly of Pakistan
- Region: Badaber Tehsil (partly), Shah Alam Tehsil (partly) and Chamkani Tehsil of Peshawar District
- Electorate: 318,774

Current constituency
- Created: 1970
- Party: Pakistan Tehreek-e-Insaf
- Member: Arbab Amir Ayub
- Created from: NA-1 Peshawar-I; NA-4 Peshawar-IV

NA-29 Peshawar-II (این اے-29، پشاور-٢) is a constituency for the National Assembly of Pakistan.

== Area ==
During the delimitation of 2018, NA-28 (Peshawar-II) acquired most of its area from NA-4 (Peshawar-IV) with a very small part acquired from NA-1 (Peshawar-I). The areas of Peshawar which are part of this constituency are listed below alongside the former constituency name from which they were acquired:

Areas acquired from NA-1 Peshawar-I

- Chuna Bhatti Phandoo Road

Areas acquired from NA-4 Peshawar-IV

- Akhun Abad
- Hazar Khwani
- Achar Deh Bahadar
- Ormur Bala
- Ormur Miana
- Ormur Payan
- Mera Kachori
- Tarnab
- Chamkani
- Phandu
- Sori Zai Payan
- Musa Zai
- Deh Bahadur

== Members of Parliament ==
=== 1970–1977: NW-4 Peshawar-IV ===
Election	Member	Party
1970	Maulana Abdul Haq	JUI

=== 1977–2002: NA-4 Peshawar-IV ===
Election	Member	Party
1977	Nasim Wali Khan	PNA
1985	Nisar Muhammad Khan	Independent
1988	Muzaffar Shah	PPP
1990	Ajmal Khan Khattak	ANP
1993	Naseerullah Babar	PPP
1997	Wali Muhammad Khan	PPP

=== 2002–2018: NA-4 Peshawar-IV ===
Election	Member	Party
2002	Sabir Hussain Awan	MMA
2008	Arbab Muhammad Zahir	ANP
2013	Gulzar Khan	PTI
2017	Arbab Amir Ayub	PTI

=== 2018–2022: NA-28 Peshawar-II ===
Election	Member	Party
2018	Arbab Amir Ayub	PTI

=== 2023–present: NA-29 Peshawar-II ===
Election	Member	Party
2024	Arbab Amir Ayub	SIC

== Election 2002 ==
2002 General Election: NA-4 (Peshawar-IV)
Party	Candidate	Votes	%	±%
MMA	Sabir Hussain Awan	28,728	45.17	
ANP	Arbab Muhammad Zahir	16,660	26.20	
PML(Q)	Arbab Shabeer Ahmad Advocate	6,266	9.85	
PML(N)	Haji Abdur Raziq	4,887	7.68	
PTI	Haji Javed Iqbal Barki	4,500	7.08	
PML(Z)	Muhammad Initkhab Khan	2,556	4.02	
Majority		12,068	18.97	
Turnout		63,597	29.61	
MMA gain from PPP				

A total of 2,226 votes were rejected.

== Election 2008 ==
General Elections were held on 18 February 2008.

All candidates receiving over 1,000 votes are listed here.

2008 General Election: NA-4 (Peshawar-IV)
Party	Candidate	Votes	%	±%
ANP	Arbab Muhammad Zahir	31,598	39.10	+12.90
PPP	Muhammad Azam Afridi	18,702	23.14	+23.14
PML(Q)	Amir Muqam	18,583	23.00	+15.32
MMA	Maulana Nisar Khan	9,452	11.70	−33.47
Independent	Arbab Muhammad Nawaz Khan	1,000	1.24	+1.24
Others	Others	1,471	1.82	+1.82
Majority		12,896	15.96	+15.96
Turnout		80,806	30.62	+1.01
ANP gain from MMA		Swing	+23.19	

A total of 1,604 votes were rejected.

== Election 2013 ==
General Elections were held on 11 May 2013.

All candidates receiving over 1,000 votes are listed here.

2013 General Election: NA-4 (Peshawar-IV)
Party	Candidate	Votes	%	±%
PTI	Gulzar Khan	55,134	39.79	+39.79
PML(N)	Nasir Khan Musazai	20,412	14.73	+14.73
JI	Sabir Hussain Awan	16,493	11.90	+11.90
ANP	Arbab Mohammed Ayub Jan	15,795	11.40	−27.70
JUI (F)	Arbab Kamal Ahmad	12,519	9.04	+9.04
PPP	Misbah ud Din	12,031	8.68	−14.46
Independent	Aneela Shaheen	1,852	1.34	+1.34
MDM	Gul Wazir Shaheen	1,519	1.10	+1.10
JUP	Molana Miraj ud Din Sirkani	1,166	0.84	+0.84
Others	Others	1,634	1.18	−0.64
Majority		34,722	25.06	+25.06
Turnout		138,555	40.34	+9.72
PTI gain from ANP		Swing	+33.75	

A total of 4,707 votes were rejected.

== By-election 2017 ==
The seat fell vacant after the death of PTI MNA Gulzar Khan on 28 August. A total 15 candidates contested on 26 October 2017. JUI and QWP (S) withdrew their candidates in favor of Nasir Mousazai of PML-N.

By-election 2017: NA-4 Peshawar-IV
Party	Candidate	Votes	%
PTI	Arbab Amir Ayub	45,737	34.83
ANP	Khush Dil Khan	24,874	18.94
PML(N)	Nasir Khan Musazai	24,790	18.88
PPP	Asad Gulzar	13,200	10.05
TLP	Allama Dr Mohammad Shafique Ameeni	9,935	7.57
JI	Wasil Farooq	7,668	5.84
Independent	Alhaj Liaqat Ali Khan	3,789	2.89
Others	Others	1,308	0.99
Valid ballots		131,298	98.01
Rejected ballots		2,662	1.99
Turnout		133,960	33.67
Majority		20,860	15.89
PTI hold			

== Election 2018 ==
General elections were held on 25 July 2018.

General election 2018: NA-28 (Peshawar-II)
Party	Candidate	Votes	%	±%
PTI	Arbab Amir Ayub	74,414	51.19	▲16.36
MMA	Sabir Hussain Awan	27,292	18.77	▲12.93^{†}
ANP	Shafi Akbar	22,096	15.20	▼3.74
Others	Others (three candidates)	21,580	14.84	
Turnout		150,488	44.71	▲11.04
Total valid votes		145,382	96.61	▼1.40
Rejected ballots		5,106	3.39	▲1.40
Majority		47,122	32.42	▲16.53
Registered electors		336,554		
PTI hold		Swing	▲10.05	

^{†}JI contested as part of MMA

== Election 2024 ==
General elections were held on 8 February 2024. Arbab Amir Ayub won the election with 68,972 votes.

General election 2024: NA-29 Peshawar-II
Party	Candidate	Votes	%	±%
PTI	Arbab Amir Ayub (Note: Filed nomination papers as PTI candidate but ECP allowed him to run as an Independent)	68,792	56.06	▲4.87
ANP	Saqib Ullah Khan	18,888	15.39	▲0.19
JUI (F)	Akhunzada Irfan Ullah Shah	10,499	8.56	N/A
Others	Others (three candidates)	24,529	19.99	
Turnout		126,607	39.72	▼4.99
Total valid votes		122,708	96.92	
Rejected ballots		3,899	3.08	
Majority		49,904	40.67	▲8.25
Registered electors		318,774		

== See also ==
- NA-28 Peshawar-I
- NA-30 Peshawar-III
