= Shandana Gulzar =

Pakistani politician

Shandana Gulzar Khan
- شاندانہ گلزار خان
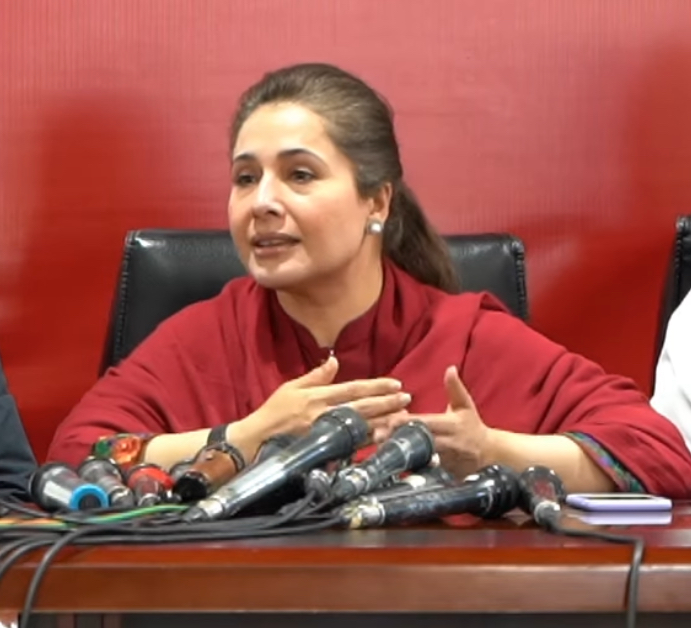
- Khan in 2024

Federal Parliamentary Secretary for Commerce
- In office 27 September 2018 – 10 April 2022
- Prime Minister: Imran Khan

Member of the National Assembly of Pakistan
- Incumbent
- Assumed office 29 February 2024
- Constituency: NA-30 Peshawar-III
- In office 13 August 2018 – 29 July 2022
- Constituency: Reserved seat for women

Personal details
- Born: 6 December 1975 (age 50) Peshawar, Khyber Pakhtunkhwa, Pakistan
- Party: PTI (2018-present)
- Parent: Gulzar Khan (father)

Shandana Gulzar Khan شاندانہ گلزار خان is a Pakistani politician who has been a member of the National Assembly of Pakistan since February 2024. She previously served as a member from August 2018 till July 2022.

She became first ever female candidate from Khyber-Pakhtunkhwa elected on general seat of National Assembly of Pakistan in February 2024.

== Education ==
Khan holds a bachelor's degree in Law from the University of Peshawar. She received the Lady Noon scholarship from the University of Cambridge and studied International Trade and International Economic Laws at the postgraduate level in 2001.

== Professional career ==
Khan has worked with the United Nations Development Program, the International Human Rights Law Group and in the lower courts and High Court of the then North West Frontier Province. She also worked as the Legal Affairs Officer at the Mission and in consultation with senior officers, dealing with the Dispute Settlement Understanding and TRIPS.

== Political career ==
Khan was elected to the National Assembly of Pakistan as a candidate of Pakistan Tehreek-e-Insaf (PTI) on a reserved seat for women from Khyber Pakhtunkhwa in the 2018 Pakistani general election.

On 27 September 2018, Prime Minister Imran Khan appointed her as Federal Parliamentary Secretary for commerce.

She was elected as the Chairperson of the Commonwealth Women Parliamentarians, a network of women members of the Commonwealth Parliamentary Association's parliament and legislatures, for a three-year term in 2019. The election was held at the sixth triennial conference of the Commonwealth Women Parliamentarians during the 64th Commonwealth Parliamentary Conference in Kampala, Uganda.

She is a member of three Standing Committees of the National Assembly including the Standing Committee on Privatization; Planning, Development and Reform; and Industries and Production. She is also a member of the National Assembly's Special Committee on Agricultural Products.

=== Resignation ===
On April 10, 2022, because of the Prime Minister Imran Khan (Leader of the House) losing his majority in the National Assembly, through a vote of no-confidence - first such successful vote, she resigned from the National Assembly on the orders of Imran Khan. The new government did not accept the resignations of many members for fear of deteriorating the number of members. However, accepting the resignations of eleven members on July 28, 2022, one of them was Shandana Gulzar Khan.

== See also ==
- List of members of the 15th National Assembly of Pakistan
