= Pakistan–NATO relations =

- Pakistan: NATO

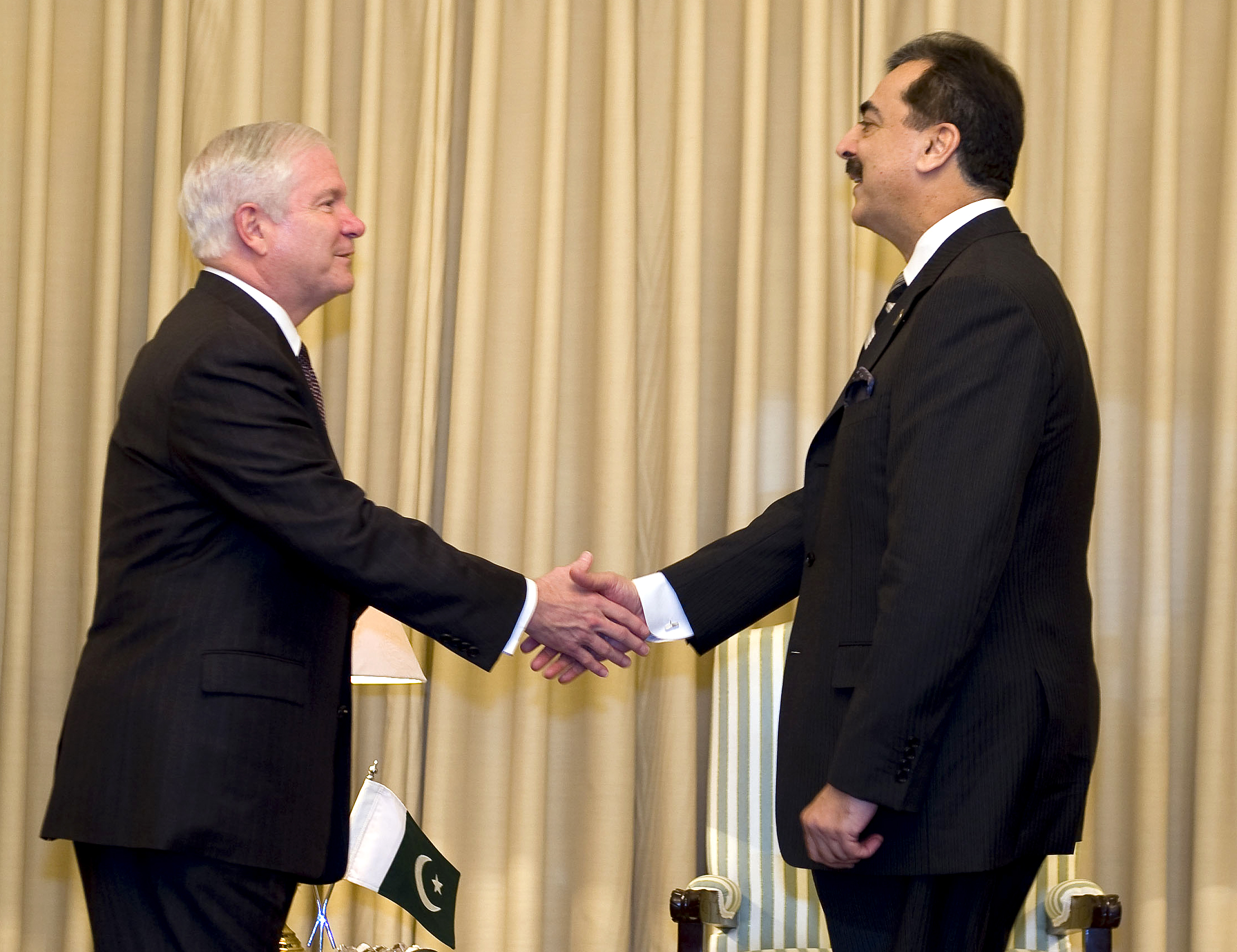
US Secretary of Defense Robert Gates shakes hands with Prime Minister Yusuf Raza Gilani.

NATO supply routes through Pakistan

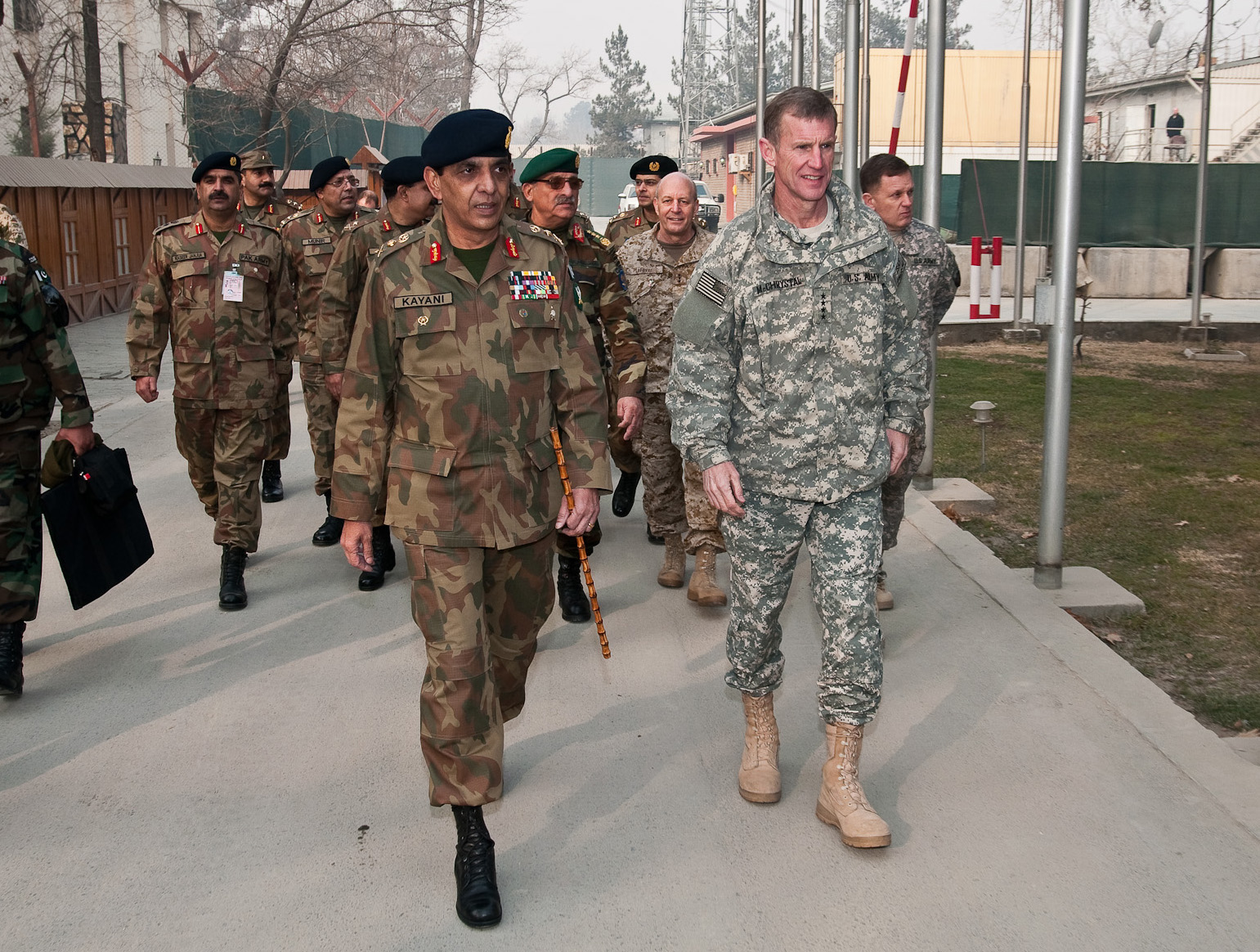
Chief of Army Staff Ashfaq Pervez Kayani and Commander of NATO International Security Assistance Force (Afghanistan) Stanley A. McChrystal lead participants towards a tripartite military conference in Kabul

North Atlantic Treaty Organization—Pakistan relations are the military–to–military relations between Pakistan and the comprised 32-states military alliance, called NATO.

NATO has developed relations with a range of countries beyond the Euro-Atlantic area, considering Pakistan as "partners across the globe." Lobbied and with a support provided by United States Secretary of State, General (retired) Colin Powell, Pakistan is designated as a "Major non-NATO ally" as of 2004.

Cooperation between Pakistan and NATO has occurred in several main sectors: fighting insurgency and terrorism in Bosnia and Afghanistan, military cooperation, transportation and logistics operations support to Afghanistan, non-proliferation, and others. With the end of the war and China's strong influence in Pakistan, bilateral relations weakened.

== Military relations and understanding ==
=== Cooperation on Bosnian War ===
In 1994, the Pakistan Armed Forces contingent joined the United Nations Protection Forces in Bosnia (UNPROFOR) to support the NATO's operations during the Bosnian war. Reviewing and recognizing the commendable performance of the Pakistan Armed Forces Contingents as United Nations peacekeepers in Somalia and Cambodia, the United Nations requested the Government of Pakistan to contribute troops to the United Nations Protection Force in Bosnia-Herzegovina. A 3000 strong contingent consisting of two Battalion Groups and a National Support (NS) Headquarters left for Bosnia and Croatia in May 1994. In close coordination with CIA and the ISI headed the intelligence operations to curbed down the insurgency in the Bosnia.

=== Stability in Afghanistan and Central Asia ===
In 2007, the Pakistan military and NATO established the Joint Intelligence Operations Centre (JIOC), a joint initiative designed to improve intelligence coordination between NATO, ISAF and Pakistan, which was opened in Kabul. According to the NATO sources, Pakistan's continuous support for the efforts of NATO and ISAF in Afghanistan remains crucial to the success of the NATO's mission. In 2007 state visit to NATO headquarters in Brussels, Belgium, Prime Minister Shaukat Aziz put it:

"Pakistan is committed to a strong, stable Afghanistan. The one country that will benefit the most, after Afghanistan itself, will be Pakistan."

Although Pakistan has expressed reservations with some operational issues, dialogue on Afghanistan once occupied important role with the Alliance.

== Conflicts of interest ==
=== Salala incident ===
In 2011, NATO's relations with Pakistan worsened after an unfriendly attack took place in near border; Pakistan responded with suspending all NATO operations, boycotting the Bonn Conference and evicting the US air force from Shamsi air force base. The squabble was resolved peacefully when United States formally apologized to Pakistan. In 2013, the military-to-military relations between NATO and Pakistan were strengthened following NATO's recognition of Pakistan's important role in the region and as enabler to NATO’s Mission in Afghanistan.

Airspace violations by NATO aircraft into Pakistan have been a common source of friction between the two parties.

=== NATO logistics ===
During the War on terror, there were two main NATO supply routes which cross through Pakistan: one was via Torkham and the other was via Chaman. The supply lines have often been blocked in Pakistan owing to differences with NATO over issues such as the Salala incident and the drone attacks in Pakistan. In late 2013, the PTI-led government in Khyber Pakhtunkhwa province blocked the Torkham supply line to protest drone attacks in Pakistan. After a request by NATO countries to Imran Khan to open the route, Khan rejected the request and stated that the blockade would continue until drone attacks are stopped. Since 2008, the NATO supply routes have also been under attack by insurgent groups, and in an incident the same year, ~42 oil tankers were destroyed, and later that same year 300 militants attacked a facility in Peshawar run by Port World Logistics and set fire to 96 supply trucks and six containers.

== See also ==
- Major non-NATO ally
- Pakistan–United States military relations
