= Fissile Material Cut-off Treaty =

Proposed international treaty

The Fissile Material Cutoff Treaty (FMCT) is a proposed international treaty to prohibit the further production of fissile material for nuclear weapons or other explosive devices. The treaty has not been negotiated and its terms remain to be defined. According to a proposal by the United States, fissile material includes high-enriched uranium and plutonium (except plutonium that is over 80% Pu-238). According to a proposal by Russia, fissile material would be limited to weapons-grade uranium (with more than 90% U-235) and plutonium (with more than 90% Pu-239). Neither proposal would prohibit the production of fissile material for non-weapons purposes, including use in civil or naval nuclear reactors.

In a 27 September 1993 speech before the UN, President Clinton called for a multilateral convention banning the production of fissile materials for nuclear explosives or outside international safeguards. In December 1993 the UN General Assembly adopted resolution 48/75L calling for the negotiation of a "non-discriminatory, multilateral and international effectively verifiable treaty banning the production of fissile material for nuclear weapons or other nuclear explosive devices." The Geneva-based Conference on Disarmament (CD) on 23 March 1995 agreed to establish a committee to negotiate "a non-discriminatory, multilateral and internationally and effectively verifiable treaty banning the production of fissile material for nuclear weapons or other nuclear explosive devices". However, substantive negotiations have not taken place.

In 2004, the United States announced that it opposed the inclusion of a verification mechanism in the treaty on the grounds that the treaty could not be effectively verified. On November 4, 2004, the United States cast the sole vote in the First Committee of the United Nations General Assembly against a resolution (A/C.1/59/L.34) calling for negotiation of an effectively verifiable treaty. The Bush Administration supported a treaty but advocated an ad hoc system of verification wherein states would monitor the compliance of other states through their own national intelligence mechanisms.

On April 5, 2009, U.S. President Barack Obama reversed the U.S. position on verification and proposed to negotiate "a new treaty that verifiably ends the production of fissile materials intended for use in state nuclear weapons." On May 29, 2009, the CD agreed to establish an FMCT negotiating committee,

However, Pakistan has repeatedly blocked the CD from implementing its agreed program of work, despite severe pressure from the major nuclear powers to end its defiance of 64 other countries in blocking international ban on the production of new nuclear bomb-making material, as well as discussions on full nuclear disarmament, the arms race in outer space, and security assurances for non-nuclear states. Pakistan justified its actions when Chairman joint chiefs General Tariq Majid argued that "a proposed fissile material cutoff treaty would target Pakistan specifically.

== See also ==
- Nuclear Non-Proliferation Treaty
- Comprehensive Test Ban Treaty
