= Arbab Amir Ayub =

Pakistani politician

- ارباب عامر ایوب

Member of the National Assembly of Pakistan
- Incumbent
- Assumed office 29 February 2024
- Constituency: NA-29 Peshawar-II
- In office 13 August 2018 – 20 January 2023
- Constituency: NA-28 (Peshawar-II)
- In office 2 November 2017 – 31 May 2018
- Constituency: NA-4 (Peshawar-IV)

Personal details
- Party: PTI (2017-present)
- Other political affiliations: ANP (2005-2017)
- Relatives: Arbab Muhammad Zahir (brother)

Arbab Amir Ayub (Urdu: ارباب عامر ایوب) is a Pakistani politician who has been a member of the National Assembly of Pakistan since 29 February 2024. Previously he was a member of the National Assembly from August 2018 till January 2023 and from November 2017 to May 2018.

== Early life and education ==
Ayub undergraduated in marketing from the United Kingdom.

== Political career ==
Ayub served as a mayor (town nazim) of Peshawar Town 4 from 2005 to 2009 as a candidate of Awami National Party (ANP).

He left ANP to join Pakistan Tehreek-e-Insaf (PTI) in May 2017.

He was elected to the National Assembly of Pakistan as a candidate of PTI from Constituency NA-4 (Peshawar-IV) in by-polls held in October 2017, following the seat fell vacant after the death of Gulzar Khan. He secured 47,586 votes and defeated a candidate of Pakistan Muslim League (N).

He was re-elected to the National Assembly as a candidate of PTI from Constituency NA-28 (Peshawar-II) in the 2018 Pakistani general election. He received 74,414 votes and defeated Sabir Hussain Awan, a candidate of Muttahida Majlis-e-Amal (MMA).
