= Warriors-Internationalists Affairs Committee =

CIS flag.

The Warriors-Internationalists Affairs Committee is a central organization for participants of local wars of CIS that provides a relationship between public organizations and state structures. The chairman of the committee has been Ruslan Aushev since August 1991.

== Committee activities ==
In November 2007, the Declaration of Cooperation Between the Warriors-Internationalists Affairs Committee and Veterans of Foreign Wars was adopted during the Moscow conference entitled "The role and place of veterans' organizations of Russia and the United States in developing and strengthening international cooperation".

The Warriors-Internationalists Affairs Committee is involved in returning former POWs from Afghanistan to Russia, as well as searching for and identifying Soviet soldiers that went missing during local wars or international conflicts. Each year, the committee organizes two to three search expeditions in Afghanistan to return home the captives or the remains of perished soldiers. The committee has gathered information on the crash site of the Il-76 shot down on December 26, 1979, and the details of the Badaber uprising in 1985. In May 2008, the 12th search expedition, under the leadership of Rashid Karimov, returned from Afghanistan with the purpose to not only establish the truth, but to also determine the burial place of remains of former Soviet prisoners of war.

== See also ==
- Badaber Uprising
- Commonwealth of Independent States
- Ruslan Aushev
