= Badaber uprising =

Armed rebellion by prisoners of war in Pakistan

Coordinates: 33°57′28″N 71°34′25″E

- Part of Operation Cyclone during the Soviet–Afghan War and Spillover of Soviet - Afghan war in Pakistan
Date	26–27 April 1985
Location	Badaber, Peshawar District, Pakistan
Result	Uprising suppressed: Soviet/Afghan POWs destroy Badaber fort and weapon caches; Escape attempt unsuccessful, all prisoners killed

Belligerents
(Soviet Union) Soviet POWs (Afghanistan) DR Afghan POWs	Afghan mujahideen: Jamiat-e-Islami; Pakistan: XI Corps; Pakistan Air Force

Commanders and leaders
(Soviet Union) Viktor Dukhovchenko † (Soviet Union) Aleksandr Alekseevich Matveev †	Burhanuddin Rabbani; Ahmad Shah Massoud (Pakistan) Akhtar Abdur Rahman

Strength
52 personnel (40 Afghans, 12 Soviets)	70 guards

Casualties and losses
51 total dead: All 40 Afghans killed; 11 Soviets killed (one missing, presumed dead)	Jamiat-e Islami: 100–120 killed (Soviet claim) 20 killed (Jamiat claim); 3 Grad MLRS destroyed; 2 million rounds of ammunition destroyed; thousands of rockets destroyed; Pakistan: 40–90 killed (Soviet claim)

The Badaber uprising (26–27 April 1985, Badaber, Pakistan) was an armed rebellion by Soviet and Afghan prisoners of war who were being held at the Badaber fortress near Peshawar, Pakistan. The prisoners fought the Afghan Mujahideen of the Jamiat-e Islami party (who were supported by the Pakistani XI Corps and American CIA advisors) in an attempt to escape.

== Background ==
The Badaber fortress, 24 km south of Peshawar, was a military training centre of the Afghan Mujahideen who opposed Soviet presence in Afghanistan. The Mujahideen were trained by military instructors from the United States (Operation Cyclone) and Pakistan. The fortress was controlled by the Tajik-dominated Jamiat-e Islami party. Burhanuddin Rabbani was the party leader and self-declared president of Afghanistan. The military commander of the fortress was Ahmad Shah Massoud.

In 1983 and 1984, Soviet and Democratic Republic of Afghanistan (DRA) prisoners were brought to the fortress from holding cells (zindans). The prisoners were forced to perform hard labour, for example, quarrying and loading ordnance. In 1985, 12 Soviet (shuravi) and 40 Afghan prisoners were held at the Badaber fortress.

== Uprising ==
On 26 April 1985, at about 6 pm, only two of seventy Mujahideen guards were on duty. The others were gathered at the drill square for evening prayers (namaz). In an uprising, prisoners entered the fortress armory, took weapons and ammunition, and tried to escape. Some may have tried to capture the fortress' radio center to report their location. However, the head guard, Haist Gol, raised the alarm and prevented the escape of the prisoners. The prisoners did seize key locations within the fortress.

Afghan Mujahideen, Pakistani infantry and tank units, and artillery forces of the XI Corps blockaded the fortress. Several attempts to recapture the fortress were repelled by the prisoners. At 9 pm, Burhanuddin Rabbani, arrived at the base and negotiated with the prisoners. He suggested they surrender and their lives would be spared. The prisoners demanded a meeting with the Soviet and Afghan ambassadors to Pakistan and representatives from the International Red Cross and Red Crescent Movement. The prisoners threatened to ignite the armory if their demands were not met. Rabbani rejected the prisoners' demands and fighting continued.

On 27 April 1985 at around 8am, Rabbani's bodyguard was wounded by rockets fired by the prisoners. Rabbani prepared to attack the fortress using rockets (9K51 Grad), tanks, and Pakistan Air Force helicopters. The uprising ended when the fortress was destroyed by an explosion. It is believed that the explosion was caused by the POWs themselves, destroying a large cache of weapons. Any survivors of the explosion were dragged to the walls and killed.

== Casualties ==
The identities of the prisoners are uncertain, including all 40 of the Afghan casualties. One was Nikolay Saminj, a Soviet forces junior sergeant, who was posthumously awarded Kazakhstan's Order of Valor, 3rd degree on 12 December 2003. Another was Alexandr Zverkovich, a Soviet forces private, who was posthumously memorialised on the 10th anniversary of the withdrawal of the Soviet Army from Afghanistan.

According to Russian sources, between 100 and 120 Afghan Mujahideen were killed, between 40 and 90 regular Pakistani military. The Badaber fortress, its armory and its ordnance (including three 9K51 Grad multiple rocket launchers, thousands of shells and rockets, approximately forty cannons, mortars, 2 million rounds of ammunition and machine guns), and its chancellery, including a list of the prisoners, were destroyed. Soviet satellite data from 28 April 1985 showed an 80 m crater at the site.

== Aftermath ==
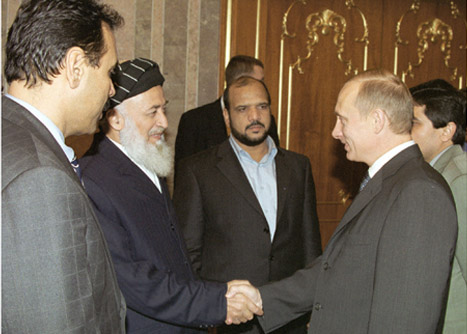
Burhanuddin Rabbani and Russian President Vladimir Putin meeting in 2001

On 29 April 1985, Muhammad Zia-ul-Haq, the President of Pakistan, classified all information related to the uprising. Gulbuddin Hekmatyar, the head of the Hezbi Islami, said:

Do not capture shuravi (Persian term for the word "Soviet") soldiers in the future, but annihilate them at the taking place.

Yousaf Mohammad, a colonel in the Pakistani Inter-Services Intelligence service said:

[the incident] could quickly get out of hand, or lead to international confrontation. Details of the uprising were suppressed in Pakistan until 1992 when six names of participants in the uprising were handed to Alexander Rutskoy by Shahryar Khan, the deputy minister of foreign affairs of Pakistan.

On 9 May 1985, a representative of the International Red Cross visiting the Soviet Embassy in Islamabad, confirmed the uprising had occurred. On 11 May 1985, Vitaly Smirnov, the Soviet ambassador, issued a warning to Muhammad Zia-ul-Haq. He said:

The Soviet side holds full responsibility for what had happened [with] the Government of Pakistan and expects that it will make appropriate conclusions about the effects posed by [its] complicity in the aggression against the DRA and thereby against the Soviet Union.

On 16 May 1985, the DRA's permanent representative to the United Nations sent a letter concerning this incident to the United Nations Secretary-General, which was circulated as an official document of the General Assembly and the Security Council.

On 10 April 1988, the Ojhri Camp, an ammunition depot near Islamabad, was destroyed, killing 93 and injuring around 1,100 people. The cause of destruction of Ojhri Camp is disputed with some reports suggesting that Soviet Union was responsible for the destruction of the camp. On 17 August 1988, President Zia-ul-Haq's plane crashed in an incident that Pakistan suggested was caused by the Soviet KGB secret services and Afghan KhAD.

In 2002, the Warriors-Internationalists Affairs Committee sent three names of uprising participants, Igor Vaskov, Nikolai Dudkin and Sergei Levchishin to Sergei Ivanov, the defense minister of Russia. However he said there is no basis to proceed with the application for the award.

== POWs ==
This is a partial list of Soviet POWs:

- Aleksandr Alekseevich Matveev, taliban nickname Abdulo (1963, Altai Krai, Russia), private first class.
- Nikolai Iosifovich Dudkin (1961, village Volchiha, Russia)
- Ravil Saifutidonov (village Bolshoi Sars, Russia).
- Igor Vaskov
- Sergei Levchishin
- Sergei Korshenko
- Alexandr Zverkovich
- Nikolai Samin', intended to immigrate to France.
- Nikolai Ivanovich Shevchenko (Abdurahman) (1956; village Dmitrievka, Ukraine), driver, initiated the revolt.
- Kanat (from Kazakh SSR), lost his mind in this prison.
- 2 other unknown Soviet soldiers, possibly Vladimir Ivanovich Shipeev (1963; Cheboksary, Russia) and Ivan Belekchi.
- Nasyrjon K. Rustamov (still alive and lives in Uzbekistan).
- Mihail Aramovich Varvaryan, nickname Islamutdin (1960; village Ararat, Armenia), private. Deserted to Mujahideen in Bagram, probably alive and was complicit with Rabbani forces.
- 40 soldiers of DRA armed forces and Sarandoy.

== In popular culture ==
The Russian–Kazakh movie, Peshavar Waltz (1994) was loosely based on this uprising.

Крепость Бадабер (Fortress Badaber), 2018 movie.

A song was written about the incident titled "В горах под Пешаваром", "Mountains of Peshawar" (Alternatively titled as "27 Апреля", "April 27", referring to the end date of the uprising) by the Blue Berets about the valiance and the honor the Soviet soldiers showed in their failed uprising.

== See also ==
- Battle of Qala-i-Jangi, a similar uprising of the Taliban and al-Qaeda captives in a fortress prison in Afghanistan in 2001.
