= Arbab Muhammad Zahir =

Pakistani politician (1945–2016)

Member of the National Assembly of Pakistan
- In office 2008–2013
- Constituency: NA-4 (Peshawar-IV)
- In office 1990–1996
- Constituency: NA-3 (Peshawar-cum-Nowshera)

Member of the Provincial Assembly of Khyber Pakhtunkhwa
- In office 1997–1999
- Constituency: PF-8 (Peshawar-VIII)
- In office 1985–1988
- Constituency: Peshawar

Personal details
- Born: 12 October 1945
- Died: 25 July 2016 (aged 70)
- Party: Awami National Party (1990–2016)
- Relatives: Arbab Amir Ayub (brother)
- Education: University of Peshawar; Aitchison College

Arbab Muhammad Zahir (12 October 1945 – 25 July 2016) was a Pakistani politician who served as Member of the National Assembly of Pakistan from 1990 to 1996 and again from 2008 to 2013. He had been a member of the Provincial Assembly of Khyber Pakhtunkhwa from 1985 to 1988 and again from 1997 to 1999.

== Early life and education ==
Arbab Mohammed Zahir was born to politician Arbab Noor Mohammad Khan on 12 October 1945.

He received his early education from Aitchison College, Lahore He received degree in bachelor of law from Khyber Law College, University of Peshawar and completed his master's degree in law from the United States.

== Political career ==
After completion his education, he entered in politics assisted his father. He was elected to Peshawar district council in the 1983 local government elections and became the vice chairman of the council.

He was elected to the Provincial Assembly of Khyber Pakhtunkhwa (then known as Provincial Assembly of the North-West Frontier Province) in the 1985 Pakistani general election.

He ran for the seat of the National Assembly of Pakistan as an independent candidate from Constituency NA-3 (Peshawar-III) in the 1988 Pakistani general election but was unsuccessful. He received 385 votes and lost the seat to Sardar Ali Khan, a candidate of Pakistan Peoples Party (PPP). In the same election, he ran for the seat of the Provincial Assembly of Khyber Pakhtunkhwa as an independent candidate from Constituency PF-7 (Peshawar-VII) and Constituency PF-8 (Peshawar-VIII) but was unsuccessful. He received 4,910 votes from Constituency PF-7 (Peshawar-VII) and lost the seat to Iftikhar Ahmad Khan, a candidate of PPP. He received 3,748 votes from Constituency PF-8 (Peshawar-VIII) and defeated Haji Abdur Raziq, a candidate of Awami National Party (ANP).

He joined the ANP around 1990 and was elected to the National Assembly as a candidate of ANP from Constituency NA-3 (Peshawar-cum-Nowshera) in the 1990 Pakistani general election. He received 38,730 votes and defeated Abdul Latif, a candidate of Pakistan Democratic Alliance (PDA).

He was re-elected to the National Assembly as a candidate of ANP from Constituency NA-3 (Peshawar-cum-Nowshera) in the 1993 Pakistani general election. He received 36,134 votes and defeated Sardar Ali, a candidate of PPP.

He was re-elected to the Provincial Assembly of Khyber Pakhtunkhwa as a candidate of ANP from Constituency PF-8 (Peshawar-VIII) in the 1997 Pakistani general election. He received 7,008 votes and defeated an independent candidate, Pirzada Sayeedul Amin.

He ran for the seat of the National Assembly as a candidate of ANP from Constituency NA-4 (Peshawar-IV) in the 2002 Pakistani general election, but was unsuccessful. He received 16,660 votes and lost the seat to Sabir Hussain Awan, a candidate of Muttahida Majlis-e-Amal (MMA).

He was re-elected to the National Assembly as a candidate of ANP from Constituency NA-4 (Peshawar-IV) in the 2008 Pakistani general election. He received 31,598 voted and defeated Muhammad Azam Afridi, a candidate of PPP. In November 2008, he was inducted into the federal cabinet of Prime Minister Yousaf Raza Gillani and was appointed as Minister of State for Defence in 2008 but was removed in 2009 because he could not attend office due to health problems. In June 2010, he was appointed as the federal minister for narcotics in 2010.

He was unable to contest the 2013 Pakistani general election due to health issues.

He died in 2016.
