= Badaber =

Village in Khyber Pakhtunkhwa, Pakistan

Badaber بڈھ بیر
- Village
- Location within Khyber Pakhtunkhwa Location within Pakistan
- Coordinates: 33°57′28″N 71°34′25″E
- Country: Pakistan
- Province: Khyber Pakhtunkhwa
- District: Peshawar District
- Tehsil: Badhber Tehsil

Government
  - Type: Tehsil-council
  - Chairman: Talah Muhammad (JUI-F)
- Time zone: UTC+5 (Pakistan Standard Time)

Badaber (Pashto: بڈھ بیر, Urdu: بڈھ بیر), alternatively spelt Badhber is a village in Peshawar District, Khyber Pakhtunkhwa, Pakistan. It is located approximately 10 km (6.2 mi) south of the city of Peshawar.

== Overview ==
Badaber currently hosts an Afghan refugee camp and formerly was the location of a military prison, established in February 1980. The prison was the site of the Badaber Uprising during the Soviet–Afghan War in 1985, in which captured Soviet and Afghan POWs staged an unsuccessful armed revolt against American CIA- and Pakistani ISI-backed Afghan mujahideen forces in an attempt to escape. Neighbouring villages include: Sheikh Mohammadi, Darra, Bazi Khel, Kaga Wala and Masho Gagar. The village is inhabited by various Pashtun tribes, most notably the Momand, Hoorizai and Khalil.

== Significance ==
Badaber is most famously known for hosting a former United States Air Force–Central Intelligence Agency facility, which was established in 1958 and administered by the American National Security Agency during the Cold War. It was from here that the 1960 Gary Powers U-2 mission was coordinated and launched to spy on the Soviet Union. At the peak of its Western Bloc operations, over 1000 American personnel were stationed here. Today, the facility (PAF Camp Badaber) serves as a non-flying base for the Pakistan Air Force. In 2023 the Eurasian Times reported that, since 2021, sixty-five U.S. Air Force personnel were stationed at Camp Badaber.

== Administrative Area ==
Badaber is part of Pakistan National Assembly constituency NA-4 (Peshawar-4); some parts of Badaber come under the PF-10 (Peshawar-10) and PF-11 (Peshawar-11) constituencies of the Khyber Pakhtunkhwa Provincial Assembly.

== Educational Facilities ==
Government Degree College Badaber, Peshawar is located in the village.

== Notable people ==
- Agha Muhammad Yahya Khan, escaped from a prisoner of war camp in Italy on his third attempt during World War II, later became President of Pakistan

== See also ==
- Peshawar
- Peshawar District
- Pakistan–United States relations
  - Pakistan–United States military relations
