= Pakistan–United States skirmishes =

2008–2012 events of the War in Afghanistan

Pakistan-United States skirmishes
- Part of the War in Afghanistan (2001–2021)
Date	10 June 2008 – 4 July 2012 (4 years, 3 weeks and 3 days)
Location	Durand Line, Western Pakistan, Afghanistan-Pakistan Border
Result	See Aftermath

Belligerents
United States (Islamic Republic of Afghanistan) Afghanistan	Pakistan

Commanders and leaders
(United States) George W. Bush (United States) Barack Obama (Islamic Republic of Afghanistan) Hamid Karzai	(Pakistan) Asif Ali Zardari (Pakistan) Yousaf Raza Gillani (Pakistan) Raja Pervez Ashraf

Units involved
ISAF Coalition Forces; USAF Afghan Command; U.S. Forces–Afghanistan; NATO Afghanistan Mission; CST Afghan Command	Western Command; XI Corps; Northern Air Command; Northern Command; Paramilitary Command

Casualties and losses
Unknown	55 killed

A series of sporadic military engagements and confrontations between Pakistan and the United States, with the occasional support of Afghanistan, took place along the Afghanistan-Pakistan border from late 2008 to late 2012, resulting in the deaths of 55 Pakistani personnel with an unknown number of U.S. casualties. These incidents involved the U.S. Forces-Afghanistan Command and ISAF forces, who had been present in Afghanistan fighting the Taliban and al-Qaeda insurgency, and the unified Western military command of the Pakistan Armed Forces against one another in a series of skirmishes that culminated in the 2011 NATO attack in Pakistan. The skirmishes ceased shortly after, as two sides ultimately made peace and continued collaboration operations against insurgent groups in Pakistan following an official, but brief, apology from then-U.S. Secretary of State Hillary Clinton on 3 July 2012 over the loss of life suffered by the Pakistani military.

== Background ==
Since the beginning of the Global War on Terrorism in late 2001 and the subsequent U.S. invasion of Afghanistan to oust the Taliban and al-Qaeda movement, the U.S. had launched several air strikes across into northwest Pakistan to target militants connected with the Afghanistan war who it alleges have fled the country and sought temporary shelter in Pakistan's bordering tribal areas. These strikes have been protested against by Pakistan, as a violation of national sovereignty, and have resulted in tense diplomatic relations between the two countries. They have also caused an uproar among Pakistan's civilian population and politicians and have fueled anti-American sentiments. Since June 2004, the United States military had launched dozens of unmanned aerial vehicle strikes against presumed Taliban targets, killing hundreds of militants and civilians, increasing in intensity post-2009. These drone strikes have been subject to heavy criticism from Pakistan, which maintains that they are not the best way to fight terror and that they will have the inevitable result of uniting the tribesmen along the border with Taliban and against the U.S.

Pakistan had previously coordinated with the U.S. on missile strikes. However after the U.S. began conducting strikes without informing Pakistani authorities, Pakistan ordered its troops to counteract. Several specific actions developed, although no serious diplomatic spats on either side have been reported yet. The actions are listed below.

== Incidents ==
=== Gora Prai incident ===
On 10 June 2008, 10 Pakistani paramilitary troops from the Frontier Corps and a Pakistan Army major, were killed by a US airstrike in Pakistani tribal areas. The airstrike occurred following clashes between Taliban fighters and Afghan troops. Afghan troops ordered an airstrike against the Taliban which, according to the US, accidentally hit a Pakistani post.

=== Standoff of 15 September 2008 ===
Pakistani troops fired warning shots into the air to deter Afghan troops from entering Pakistan. It occurred on the Afghan side of the Afghanistan-Pakistan border close to Angoor Ada, some 30 kilometers from Wana, the main town in South Waziristan in the Federally Administered Tribal Areas of Pakistan.

Seven US helicopter gunships and two troop-carrying Chinook helicopters landed on the Afghan side of the border, in the Afghan province of Paktika, where US troops then tried to cross the border into Pakistan. As they did so, Pakistani paramilitary soldiers at a checkpoint began firing shots and the US troops decided not to continue forward. The firing reportedly lasted for several hours. Local tribesmen also evacuated their homes and took up defensive positions in the mountains after placing women and children out of harm's way.

The standoff occurred less than two weeks after 3 September 2008 Angoor Ada raid, during which U.S. Special Forces conducted a raid inside Pakistani territory. That incident caused much consternation and protests in Pakistan, over the violation of Pakistan's sovereignty.

=== Lowara Madi incident ===
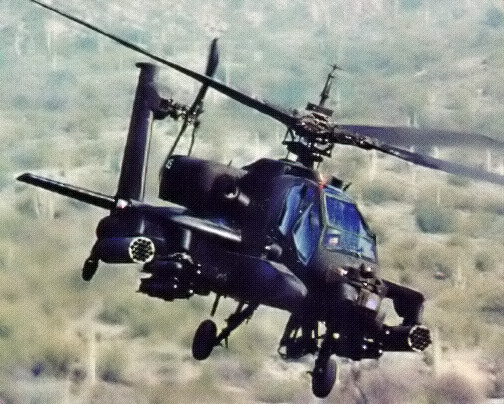
Two AH-64 Apache helicopters were intercepted over Pakistani territory

On 21 September 2008 at 10 pm local time, in the Ghulam Khan district of North Waziristan Pakistani soldiers fired on two American helicopter gunships, that entered Pakistani airspace, with 12.7 mm heavy machine guns. The helicopters stopped and hovered for a while, before returning over the border to Afghanistan without retaliation. It is unknown if any of the helicopters sustained any damage in this first incident.

Thirty minutes later, two gunships attempted to cross the border again at the same place. Pakistani regular and Frontier Corps troops fired warning shots into the air and away from the helicopters, causing the helicopters to turn back without attacking any targets in Pakistan.

=== Tanai incident ===
On 25 September 2008 Pakistani troops fired on two American OH-58 Kiowa reconnaissance helicopters; U.S. ground troops, who the helicopters were supporting, returned fire. No one was injured on either side and the helicopters were undamaged. American and NATO officials asserted that the helicopters were flying within Afghan territory to protect an armed patrol. Pakistani officials declared that the helicopters were inside Pakistani territory and were fired upon by "flares" as a warning.

=== Kurram incident ===
On 30 September 2010. U.S. helicopters entered Pakistani airspace after ground troops determined that a mortar attack by militants in Pakistan was imminent, according to the Coalition. Pakistani Frontier Corps troops manning the Mandata Kadaho border post fired warning shots, and the helicopters responded by firing two missiles that destroyed the post. Three soldiers were killed and another three wounded. Pakistan responded by closing a key NATO supply route for eleven days.

=== Datta Khel incident ===
On May 17, 2011, a skirmish between a U.S. helicopter and Pakistani forces took place in the Datta Khel area. According to NATO, an American base along the Afghanistan-Pakistan border took direct and indirect fire from Pakistan. Two U.S. helicopters flew into the area. According to the Pakistani military, the helicopters had breached its airspace. Pakistani forces fired at a helicopter twice, and the helicopter returned fire, injuring two soldiers. Pakistan reportedly deployed two attack helicopters, which arrived after the U.S. helicopters had left.

=== Salala incident ===
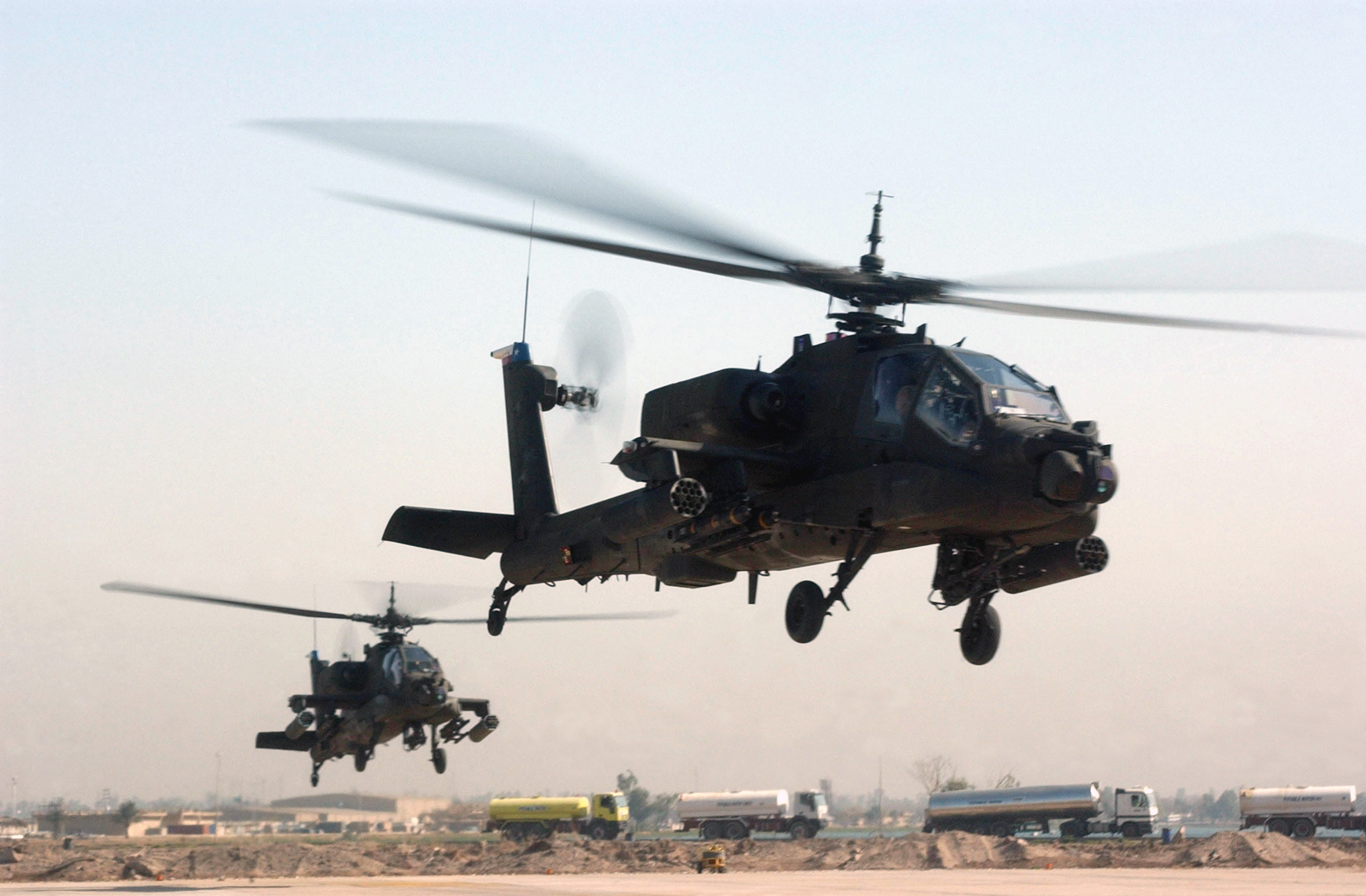

On 26 November 2011, 28 Pakistani soldiers, including 2 officers, were killed and the remainder injured in an attack on two Pakistani border posts in Mohmand tribal region by NATO Apache helicopters, an AC-130 gunship and fighter jets. There were a total of 40 soldiers present in the check post and the raid took place at night while most of them were sleeping or resting. The attack was the deadliest strike to date on Pakistani soil by NATO. Pakistan claimed that there was no militant activity along the Afghan border region when NATO conducted the attack. Pakistan immediately suspended all NATO supplies to Afghanistan in the aftermath of the attack. Pakistan later also ordered the U.S. to completely shut down operations and vacate the Shamsi Airfield in Balochistan, which the U.S. reportedly used for launching drone attacks in Pakistan, within a time frame of 15 days, the NATO claimed responsibility for the attack.

== Aftermath ==
Skirmishes between the United States and Pakistan concluded after Hillary Clinton, United States Secretary of State, apologized for the death of Pakistani personnel from the 2011 NATO attack in Pakistan. Subsequently, Pakistan agreed to reopen NATO supply routes to Afghanistan.

== See also ==
- Pakistan–United States military relations
- Afghanistan–Pakistan skirmishes, a closely related series of military confrontations
- Indo-Pakistani wars and conflicts
- AfPak, a term once used to describe the US/NATO war in South Asia
