= First British Expedition on the North West Frontier =

The first British military action after the British took over control of Punjab from the Sikh Rule in March 1849; was the operation against Baizais which a sub-tribe of the Yousafzai main tribe. This expedition was also the First British military action against the Yusufzai tribe which was conducted from December 3 to December 14, 1849. It was headed by Lieutenant-Colonel J. Bradshaw, C.B. Expedition was mainly against villages in the Baizai area on the north-western frontier of British India.

== Background ==
The British were already in conflict with Baizai communities during the period of Sikh Rule. In October 1847, Major George St Patrick Lawrence, who was then serving under the Sikh administration in Peshawar, led an operation against the village of Babuzai after an attack on his party. The immediate reason for this British expedition was a dispute over revenue and tribal activities. The village of Sanghao, which was in the British-controlled area, refused to pay its land revenue. The villagers ignored the orders of the British authorities. They also formed alliances with the nearby tribes of Palai, Zormandai, and Sherkhana. These groups were accused of staging cross-border raids into British-settled areas. To prevent a breakdown of border security and bring the situation under control, the British decided that a military action was necessary.

The village was captured and burned, and expeditionary force subsequently moved against Palai in Sam Baizai after learning that men from the village had taken part in the fighting at Babuzai.

== Area of Operation ==
The Baizai valley is a strategic pocket tucked between the Paja and Malakand mountain ranges at the northern edge of the Peshawar/Mardan district. At the time of operation Baizai area was divided into two parts:-

- British Baizai: This was the lowland area. The villages here were expected to pay revenue to the new British administration.
- Swat Baizai (or Sam Baizai): This was the highland area. It was controlled by local independent tribal chiefs.

== British Field Force ==
The British assembled a field force of about 2,300 men from Peshawar. The force was commanded by Lieutenant Colonel J. Bradshaw of the 60th Rifles. This force was composed of following men and materials:

- Infantry:
  - A detachment of 200 men from the 60th Rifles
  - A detachment of 300 men from the 61st Regiment of Foot Infantry
  - 3rd Regiment of Bombay Native Infantry
- Artillery: The 2nd Troop, 2nd Brigade, Horse Artillery, having four heavy guns.
- Cavalry: The 13th Irregular Cavalry
- Engineers: The 1st Company of Bombay Sappers and Miners

== Conduct ==
- Attack on Sanghao: The British force marched north from Peshawar towards the Lundkhwar Valley. On December 11, 1849, the force reached the fortified village of Sanghao. The Baizai tribesmen had taken positions on the high rocky cliffs overlooking the village. Horse Artillery shelled the heights while infantry detachments from the 60th Rifles and native units scaled the steep cliffs. The tribesmen were unable to hold their positions against the British artillery and were forced to withdraw. The British took control of Sanghao and destroyed its defensive towers so that these could not be used again in future.
- Move into Swat Baizai: After taking Sanghao, the British realized that some of the people involved in the resistance had taken shelter in independent tribal areas. On December 14, the force crossed the frontier into Swat Baizai and advanced towards the major rebel strongholds of Palai, Zormandai, and Sherkhana. The tribesmen, heavily reinforced by fighters from neighbouring Swati areas, gathered in large numbers to defend the valley entrance. Bradshaw deployed his cavalry on the plains to prevent flanking maneuvers. The artillery guns then pounded the main settlements. The British force successfully stormed and burnt all three insurgent villages, alongside their local grain stores. This was intended to cut off their food supply and reduce their ability to continue the resistance.
- The force subsequently withdrew from the valley without being attacked during the withdrawal.

== Casualties and Results ==
The British force sustained relatively small losses, recording 7 men killed and about 40 wounded. The Baizai and supporting Swati clans suffered heavy losses, though their exact number is not known. After the expedition, the terrified Baizai chiefs (maliks) formally accepted the authority of the British government. They agreed to pay the required revenue and to stop supporting or sheltering people who carried out raids against British territory. Being the first Expedition by British after taking over the Rule from Sikhs; was very important not only because of the fighting itself, but also because it showed how the British intended to deal with resistance along the Yusufzai frontier during the early years of their rule.
