= Contents of the United States diplomatic cables leak (United Arab Emirates) =

Content from the United States diplomatic cables leak has depicted United Arab Emirates and related subjects extensively. The leak, which began on 28 November 2010, occurred when the website of WikiLeaks — an international new media non-profit organisation that publishes submissions of otherwise unavailable documents from anonymous news sources and news leaks — started to publish classified documents of detailed correspondence — diplomatic cables — between the United States Department of State and its diplomatic missions around the world.

== Iran-UAE relations ==
=== Iran nuclear program ===
Abu Dhabi Crown Prince Mohammed bin Zayed of the United Arab Emirates, referred to as MBZ in the cables, urged the US "not to appease Iran" and described Iran's then-leader Ahmadinejad to Hitler. He said that UAE is even more worried about Iranian intentions than is Israel and described a nuclear-armed Iran as "absolutely untenable". He believes that "all hell will break loose" if Iran attains the bomb, with Egypt, Saudi Arabia, Syria and Turkey developing their own nuclear weapons capability and Iran "instigating Sunni-Shia conflict".

In the cable leak, Mohammed bin Zayed was said to believe Israel will strike Iran if Iran develops nuclear missiles, causing Iran to launch missile attacks on the region including the UAE. He believes that an Israeli strike will not be successful in stopping Iran's nuclear program, but instead cause Iran to "unleash terror attacks worldwide". Mohammad bin Zayed also stated that Iran surrounding Israel is "driven by ideological conviction and will threaten Israel's existence should it go nuclear". At the same time, he described Iran's ambitions as reflecting a desire to "restore Persia's great-power status, rather than driven by religious convictions".

Mohammed bin Zayed suggested that the key to containing Iran revolves around progress on the Israeli–Palestinian conflict. He argued that it will be essential to bring Arab public opinion in line with the leadership in any conflict with Iran and that roughly "eighty percent of the public is amenable to persuasion". The US has to bring a two state solution over the objections of the Netanyahu government to win over the people. He suggested working with moderate Palestinians that support the road map, and that "there is no time to waste".

== Lebanon-UAE relations ==
=== Lebanese Armed Forces ===
Emirati Foreign Minister Abdullah bin Zayed has said that UAE will purchase additional munitions for Lebanese Armed Forces helicopters, donated by the UAE to LAF last year, but is waiting for France to provide a price estimate.

== Pakistan-UAE relations ==
=== Pakistan's leaders ===
In July 2009, Abu Dhabi Crown Prince Mohammed bin Zayed, Deputy Supreme Commander of the UAE Armed Forces, said Zardari was "dirty but not dangerous" and that former prime minister Nawaz Sharif was "dangerous but not dirty -- this is Pakistan".

=== Support to Pakistan F-16 acquisition ===
Mohammed bin Zayed supported the US's decision to sell F-16 aircraft to Pakistan to strengthen the Musharraf government, saying the sale would not alter the balance of strength between India and Pakistan.

=== Baloch insurgency ===
DG ISI General Shuja Pasha commented that India, the UAE, and Russia were funding, arming, and training the Baloch rebels.

=== Drone attacks in Pakistan ===
In a cable it was noted that UAE had allowed Americans to use an airstrip of UAE in Pakistan (Shamsi Airbase) in order to launch drone strikes against militants. UAE was displeased over publicity of support to US military in Pakistan when it was revealed by General Tommy Franks in his book "American Soldier" due to the concerns that public knowledge of this confidential assistance may cause risks to the security of UAE or UAE officials in Pakistan.

=== Alleged Indian and Iranian support for insurgents in Pakistan ===
The UAE believed that India and Iran had aided Taliban and Pushtun separatists in Pakistan, and that Pashtuns in the UAE may be supporting the Taliban.

== UAE-UK relations ==
=== Prince Andrew ===
Diplomats in the UAE revealed that Mohammed bin Zayed, Abdullah II of Jordan and the UK's Prince Andrew, Duke of York, are "close friends" that "frequently hunt — in Morocco and Tanzania".

== UAE-US relations ==
=== Predator drones ===
UAE military officials have pressured the US to acquire Predator B drones to be used in countering Iran citing that Iran is known to be developing its own drones. Sheikh Mohammed bin Zayed told US General John Abizaid "That's why we need it first...give me Predator B".

=== Mohammad bin Zayed ===
In a cable leak, then US ambassador to the UAE Richard G. Olson described Mohammed bin Zayed as "the key decision maker on national security issues", and assessed that he had "authority in all matters except for final decisions on oil policy and major state expenditures." He described the UAE president Khalifa bin Zayed Al Nahyan as "a distant and uncharismatic personage", in contrast with Mohammed bin Zayed, who Olson regarded as a "dynamic member of the generation succeeding the geriatric cases who have dominated the region for decades." He continues to state that Mohammed bin Zayed is "a reformer, actively seeking to improve the life of his citizens and the UAE's future through better education and health care, and through economic diversification, including investments in clean energy to prepare his citizenry for a post-hydrocarbon future". According to Olson, Mohammad bin Zayed has structured the UAE Armed Forces to be closely aligned with the US and continues to "support us where he thinks we have been right (Afghanistan), but also where he thinks we have pursued misguided policies (Iraq)."

=== Terror donors ===
It was noted in a cable that UAE-based donors have provided financial support to a variety of terrorist groups, including al-Qa'ida, the Taliban, LeT, Hamas and other terrorist groups. Washington agencies noted that there is limited information on the identity of Taliban and LeT donors in the UAE.

In another cable leak, discussion was noted regarding the UAE regulations requiring declarations for cash imports of over US$10,800, but no regulations existing covering cash exports. The US embassy was working closely with UAE government on the problem of cash couriers and the need to develop a plan to stop UAE based cash being transferred to fund terror groups.
