= Umm Al Melh Border Guards Airport =

Umm Al Melh Border Guards Airport مطار سلاح الحدود أم الملح
- IATA: none; ICAO: OEOM

Summary
- Operator: General Directorate of Border Guards
- Location: Eastern Province, Saudi Arabia
- Elevation AMSL: 778 ft (237 m)
- Coordinates: 19.115672°N 50.128890°E

Map
- Location of airport in Saudi Arabia

Runways
Direction	Length		Surface
Direction	m	ft	Surface
05/23	3,000	9,843	concrete

Umm Al Melh Border Guards Airport (Arabic: مطار سلاح الحدود أم الملح) is a Saudi government air base located in southwestern Eastern Province, Saudi Arabia.

The air base was commissioned by the Ministry of the Interior in November 2010 as a base of operations for the Border Guards to patrol the country's southern border. It is part of a proposed network of air bases that would serve as transport, logistical support and evacuation centers for the Border Guards. The base is under construction in the vast Rub' al Khali desert about 43 kilometres (27 mi) from the Yemeni border by the Abdullah A. M. Al-Khodari Sons Company. The first phase of the project was completed for SR 86.3 million. The second phase was commissioned in August 2011 at a cost of SR 120.7 million.

In February 2013, Wired magazine suggested the air base may be a secret U.S. drone base used to carry out drone strikes on targets in Yemen, including the killing of Anwar al-Awlaki in 2011. Although Wired was unable to confirm the claim, both Foreign Policy and Haaretz reported that it was "almost certainly" the secret base. The existence of a Central Intelligence Agency-run drone base in southern Saudi Arabia had been revealed by U.S newspapers two days earlier.

== See also ==
- Shamsi Airfield
