= Daulat Khel Bangash =

Pashtun tribe

Daulat Khel is a subtribe of Baizai Bangashes. Bai Khan, their reputed ancestor, is said to have had a son, Daulat Khan, and the tappa is often named Daulat Khel after him - Daulat Khel and Baizai being almost synonymous terms.
