= Salala incident =

Afghanistan–Pakistan border skirmish

- Part of the Pakistan–United States skirmishes
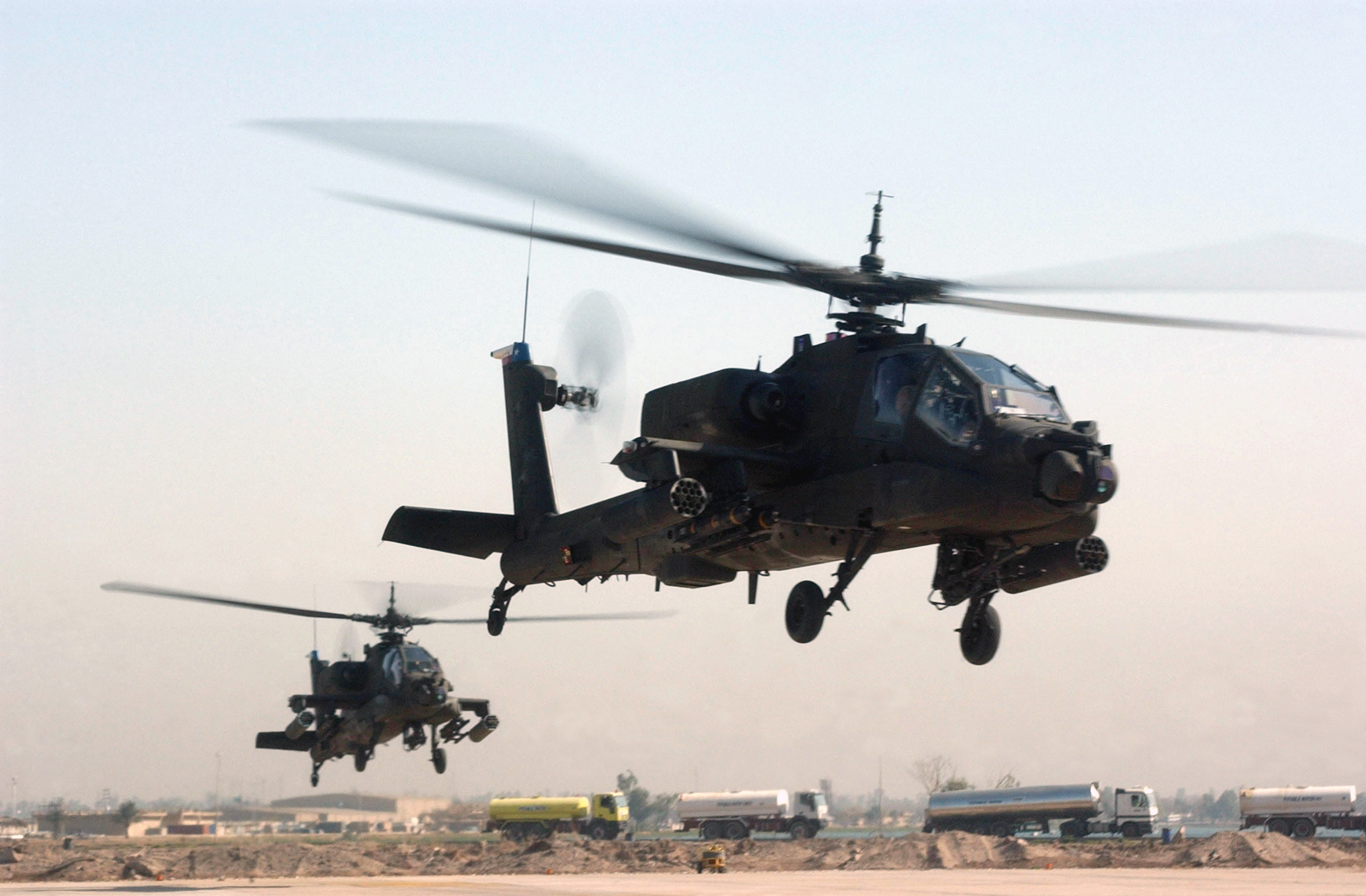
- Two American Apache helicopters, along with other aircraft, attacked Pakistani posts
Date	26 November 2011; 14 years ago
Location	Salala, Baizai Tehsil, Mohmand Agency, FATA, Pakistan 34.5°N 71.0°E
Result	Inconclusive

Belligerents
Pakistan	NATO: United States; Afghanistan: Afghan National Army

Commanders and leaders
(Pakistan) Mujahid Mirani †; (Pakistan) Usman Ali †	Unknown

Strength
40 troops; Anti-aircraft guns	2 AH-64D Apache Longbows; 1 AC-130H Spectre gunship; 2 F-15E Strike Eagle fighter jets; 1 MC-12W Liberty intelligence, surveillance and reconnaissance aircraft, unknown number of U.S troops

Casualties and losses
24 killed; 13 wounded; 2 checkpoints destroyed	Unknown
- Location of the attack within Pakistan

The Salala incident (Urdu: واقعہ سلالہ), was a border skirmish that occurred when United States-led NATO forces engaged Pakistani security forces at two Pakistani military checkpoints along the Afghanistan–Pakistan border on 26 November 2011, with both sides later claiming that the other had fired first.

Two NATO Apache helicopters, an AC-130 gunship and two F-15E Strike Eagle fighter jets entered as little as 200 metres (660 ft) to up to 2.5 kilometres (1.6 mi) into the Pakistani border ridge of Salala (located in the Baizai subdivision of the Mohmand Agency in the then Federally Administered Tribal Areas) at 2 a.m. local time. They came from across the border in Afghanistan and opened or returned fire at two Pakistani border patrol checkpoints, killing 28 Pakistani soldiers and wounding 12 others. This attack resulted in deterioration of relations between Pakistan and the United States. The Pakistani public reacted with protests across the country and the government under Prime Minister Yusuf Raza Gilani took measures adversely affecting the American exit strategy from Afghanistan, including the evacuation of Shamsi Airfield and closure of the NATO supply line in Pakistan. Pakistan also rejected a U.S. offer of compensation for the killing of its soldiers in the NATO attack.

On 3 July 2012, then-United States Secretary of State Hillary Clinton officially apologized for the losses suffered by the Pakistani military in the 2011 attack. Subsequently, Pakistan restored the NATO supply routes.

== Background and timeline ==
=== The attack ===
On 26 November 2011, US-led NATO forces opened fire on two Pakistani border checkpoints near the Afghanistan–Pakistan border. The attack occurred at approximately 01:30 in Afghanistan and 21:00 GMT. According to the Director General of Military Operations (DGMO), Major General Ashfaq Nadeem, the attack was a coordinated NATO strike and used two AH-64D Apache Longbow helicopters, an AC-130H Spectre gunship and two F-15E Strike Eagle fighter jets. A MC-12W Liberty turbo-propeller aircraft was used in an intelligence, surveillance, and reconnaissance role. The checkpoints were located 200 metres (660 ft) to 2.5 kilometres (1.6 mi) inside Pakistan from the border with Afghanistan in the Salala area of the Baizai subdivision of the Mohmand Agency in the Federally Administered Tribal Areas (FATA), Pakistan, and separated by a distance of one kilometre on the Salala mountain top.

The attacks caused the deaths of up to twenty-four Pakistani soldiers, including two officers, Major Mujahid Mirani and Captain Usman Ali. Thirteen other soldiers were injured. Both sides reported they were attacked first. The poorly defined border, as well as a history of Taliban fighters moving around the Afghan border regions, were cited as possible contributing factors to the incident.

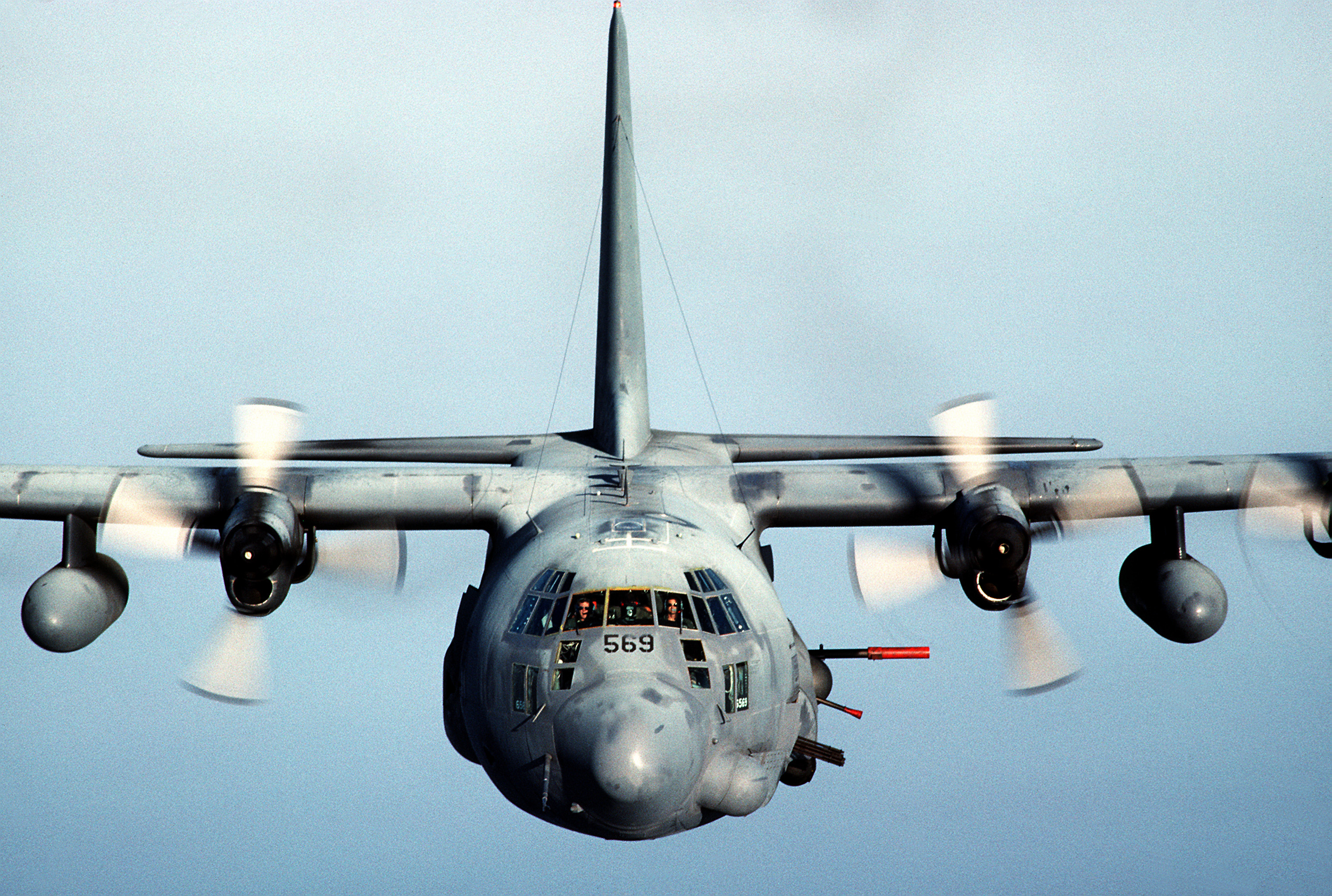
An AC-130 gunship (pictured) was used in addition to two Apache helicopters and two F-15E Strike Eagle fighter jets to carry out the attack.

==== US–Afghan claims ====
According to Afghan and US officials, the incident started after US–Afghan coalition forces, which were conducting an operation against the Afghan Taliban in Afghanistan's eastern Kunar Province, were fired upon from border positions within Pakistan. "There was firing coming from the position against Afghan army soldiers who requested support", said one Afghan official in Kabul.

The Afghan official further stated they were being fired upon directly from a Pakistani military outpost itself. A Western official backed up that view by stating, "They were fired on from a Pakistani army base." And, "It was a defensive action." According to Afghan and US accounts helicopters were then called in for support against the incoming fire.

A Pakistani defence official reportedly stated that soldiers in the Pakistani border post were there for the express purpose of stopping infiltration and fired a few flares, a couple of mortar rounds and one or two bursts of machine-gun fire in that direction.

An unnamed "Western official" in Kabul supported the view that the coalition forces had acted in self-defense against fire coming from a Pakistani base. A US official pointed to an incident in September 2010, when a US helicopter fired on a Pakistan outpost, killing three soldiers: "It was a situation where insurgent forces butted right up against a Pakistani border post and used that as a firing position. When we fired back, we hit Pakistani security forces." Military officials in Kabul claimed insurgents in Pakistan used empty Pakistan border bases to stage attacks, which they say may have been the working assumption of the coalition forces who called in the airstrike when they drew fire.

One US official said NATO forces had informed the Pakistani army's 11th Corps command near the western border that operations against Taliban insurgents would take place on that day. Pakistani General Abbas admitted in a press conference that coalition forces had "informed our military earlier, much earlier, that they will be conducting an operation there."

According to the US military, information about the proposed strike was passed on at one of the centres on the border where both sides station officers and exchange information in an effort to avoid firing on each other, after which Pakistani officers cleared the strike, saying that there were no Pakistani forces in the area.

==== Pakistani claims ====
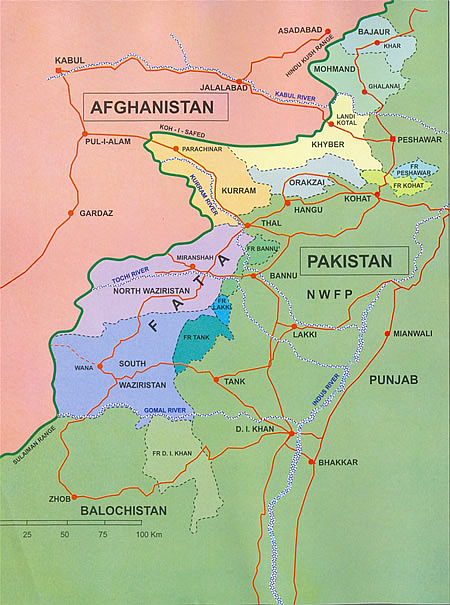
Map of the Federally Administered Tribal Areas (in colours) of Pakistan. The Mohmand Agency is located in the north. Click to enlarge

The incident sparked outrage and controversy in Pakistan, which termed the attack an "unprovoked and indiscriminate firing," an "irresponsible act," and a "stark violation" of its sovereignty. Leaders of the Pakistani military establishment viewed NATO's attacks on the army checkpoints as intentional, pre-planned and premeditated. Slamming NATO's version of events as "lame excuses", Pakistan rejected claims of any firing having emanated from its side as a prelude to the encounter, saying that the soldiers who were manning the post were asleep and resting when NATO launched the assault at night. The director general of the ISPR, Major General Athar Abbas challenged NATO to "present proof if they claim that firing was started from Pakistani side. No fire was opened from our side." He asserted that "At this point, NATO and Afghanistan are trying to wriggle out of the situation by offering excuses. Where are their casualties?" Meanwhile, the claim that the airstrike was cleared by Pakistani authorities was categorically denied by Pakistan which claimed that the attack continued for two hours, even after Pakistani officials alerted coalition forces to stop.

Preliminary reports from the Pakistan Army told of about 40 soldiers being present at the two check posts, most of whom were sleeping or resting when the raid took place. The helicopters first attacked the border post, named "Volcano", atop the mountain peak. This initial attack cut all the communications to and from the post, and a Pakistan Air Force air support could not be called in time to counter the attack. Instead, Pakistani troops stationed at the nearby post named "Boulder" engaged the NATO helicopters with anti-aircraft guns. The helicopters soon withdrew.

Pakistani authorities tried to contact their NATO counterparts in an effort to inform them of the situation but the Pakistani request reportedly failed to reach the attacking force. The helicopters returned a second time engaging Boulder border post again. A short while later communication with the NATO commanders was established and the attack was called off. All casualties were from the initial attack on the Volcano border post. Later, Major General Abbas expressed that it was beyond comprehension why the NATO forces returned to attack the second time.

According to local officials, there was no militant activity along the Afghan border region when NATO conducted the attack. Abbas, spokesperson ISPR, said that the coordinates of the two border posts had been given to ISAF. He added that the attack lasted for almost two hours and claimed that the personnel on the posts alerted the GHQ which in turn immediately informed the ISAF regional base in Afghanistan to stop the attack at roughly 12:30 AM but they did not. GHQ in return gave permission to the personnel on the outposts to retaliate. NATO communicated at roughly 1:15 AM that they had realised that they were attacking the Pakistani Army and that their forces had been ordered to stop. Yet NATO's aerial bombardment continued with another salvo aimed at the Pakistani rescue force that rushed to the aid of the two posts. Pakistan termed the event an "unprovoked and indiscriminate firing", an "irresponsible act", and a "stark violation" of its sovereignty. The attack was the deadliest NATO strike on Pakistani soil since the start of the war in Afghanistan. In a media conference with the Director General of Military Operations (DGMO) Major General Ashfaq, Chief of General Staff Lieutenant General Waheed Arshad, claimed that this was not an "unintended" incident. Describing the series of events he commented that NATO was informed at the time of the attack but their helicopters remained hostile to the Pakistani forces stationed in the area. The Pakistani military also said that the NATO forces returned a second time to attack the post again. When he was asked whether Pakistan was satisfied with the investigating team headed under US Air force Brigadier General Stephon, he responded sharply by commenting that all of the incidents in the past, in relation to the violation of Pakistan's sovereignty, did not come close to a sought after conclusion. Pakistan was invited to jointly investigate the incident but refused to participate.

On 9 December, Major General Ashfaq claimed that NATO had been monitoring radio transmissions that night and knew they had hit Volcano post. The Pakistani military called the strike "unprovoked and indiscriminate." The government of Pakistan began to sever ties with the U.S. by immediately discontinuing the supply routes of NATO troops located in Afghanistan. Notably, the strike on Saturday came one day after Gen. John Allen, the commander of the US-led coalition in Afghanistan, visited Pakistani army chief Gen. Ashfaq Parvez Kayani. In that meeting, both the commanders discussed border co-ordination and other measures "aimed at enhancing border control on both sides."

== Repercussions of the incident ==
=== Closure of NATO supply lines ===
NATO supply lines through Pakistan

Pakistan immediately closed all NATO supplies to Afghanistan in the aftermath of the attack, leaving the blockaded supply trucks vulnerable to attacks. NATO trucks had been using the supply routes, in Khyber Agency (through the Khyber Pass at Torkham) and Balochistan (near Chaman), to supply US and international forces fighting in Afghanistan.

US policy makers tried to find alternative routes through Russia, Kazakhstan, Uzbekistan, and Tajikistan (termed as the "Northern Distribution Network") but these were longer and less effective than the routes through Pakistan. There were huge costs associated with the Central Asian supply lines, and NATO's supply line through Russia was already under the looming danger of closure due to friction over missile defence plans. Being a landlocked country, Afghanistan is highly dependent on Pakistan for its imports. According to figures released by The Pentagon in January 2012, the United States was paying six times more to send supplies to troops in Afghanistan via alternative supply routes following the closure of Pakistani routes. The figures placed the new US costs at $104 million per month, roughly $87 million costlier per month than when the cargo was transported via Pakistan. The high costs were associated with the routes being lengthier.

==== Continued strife ====
In late March 2012, a US military official stated that the United States would have to use routes through the Northern Distribution Network (NDN) for supplies to Afghanistan if Pakistan refused to reopen its supply lines. However, he conceded the expensiveness of these routes and noted that negotiations with Pakistan regarding the possibility of opening of the supply routes were ongoing. After reviewing United States-Pakistan relations and outlining what was needed to repair bilateral relations, the Pakistani parliament turned the decision of reopening the NATO supply lines over to the government in April 2012. Due to an upcoming general election in Pakistan, with widespread anti-American sentiments in the country, the Pakistani government was reluctant to reopen the lines, and postponed its decision until the United States responded positively to Pakistani demands outlined in the parliamentary recommendations such as a US apology for the November 2011 incident, the bringing of those involved in the strike to justice, and a stop to US drone airstrikes. Talks between Pakistan and the United States fell through in April 2012 after Pakistan was unable to acquire an unconditional apology from the United States for the November 2011 incident. The White House refused to apologise after Taliban attacks in Kabul and other cities in Afghanistan on 15 April 2012, which according to US military and intelligence officials came from the Haqqani network, an Afghan group working from a base in North Waziristan along the Afghanistan border in Pakistan's tribal belt. Pakistani officials said they could not open the NATO supply routes in Afghanistan without a US apology.

Later in May, Pakistan demanded the United States pay stiff fees as a condition to opening up the NATO supply routes into Afghanistan. The United States, however, was unable to pay the required $5,000 per truck due to budgetary restraints according to US Secretary of Defense Leon Panetta. "Considering the financial challenges that we're facing, that's not likely," Panetta said of the Pakistani demand of $5,000 for each truck carrying supplies across its territory to the NATO troops. Unnamed US officials said that US officials had hoped a meeting between Pakistani President Asif Ali Zardari and US President Barack Obama during the 2012 NATO Chicago Summit might provide an incentive for a deal on resuming supply shipments. "The invitation was an inducement to get them back into the international fold," said a senior US official, speaking anonymously because of the sensitive issues. "But the Pakistanis couldn't get their own act together" in time for the summit. "The main issue, it seems, is money."

The United States and Pakistan had nearly completed a deal to reopen crucial NATO supply routes into Afghanistan in June 2012, when Defense Secretary Leon E. Panetta said the US was "reaching the limits of our patience" over Islamabad's failure to root out Afghan insurgents in its tribal areas. In the wake of Panetta's comments, deputy assistant secretary of Defense Peter Lavoy was denied a meeting with the Pakistani Army Chief, General Ashfaq Parvez Kayani, and the Pentagon announced that it was bringing home a negotiating team that had worked in the Pakistani capital for nearly two months to end the bitter impassé over the supply routes. A senior US official disputed the notion that Panetta's criticism of Pakistan had set back the talks. "The sticking point for a long time has been the apology issue," the official said.

==== Supply lines reopening ====
Pakistan decided to reopen the supply lines after the US Secretary of State Hillary Clinton apologised on 3 July 2012 for the Salala incident via a telephone call to Pakistani Foreign Minister Hina Rabbani Khar. "Foreign Minister Khar and I acknowledged the mistakes that resulted in the loss of Pakistani military lives," Clinton said in a statement. "We are sorry for the losses suffered by the Pakistani military. We are committed to working closely with Pakistan and Afghanistan to prevent this from ever happening again." US Secretary of Defence Leon Panetta said in a separate statement that the US "remains committed to improving our partnership with Pakistan and to working closely together as our two nations confront common security challenges in the region", US General John R. Allen said in a statement that the agreement is "a demonstration of Pakistan's desire to help secure a brighter future for both Afghanistan and the region at large." and NATO Secretary-General Anders Fogh Rasmussen welcomed the announcement to reopen the supply lines, stating it highlighted the important role Pakistan has in supporting a stable future for Afghanistan.

Pakistani reactions to the US apology were different. "We appreciate Secretary Clinton's statement, and hope that bilateral ties can move to a better place from here. I am confident that both countries can agree on many critical issues, especially on bringing peace to the region," Pakistan's ambassador to the US Sherry Rehman said in a statement. In general the decision to reopen the supply routes was met in Pakistan with a general sense of befuddlement and muted criticism that the Pakistani government had given up a much-trumpeted increase in transit fees for NATO trucks. Opposition politicians criticised the move and demanded more of an explanation from the Pakistani government and military. "Now government should let the people know about the terms and conditions for reopening the NATO supply lines. What were the demands?" said former foreign minister Shah Mehmood Qureshi. Enver Baig, an opposition politician belonging to the Pakistan Muslim League-Nawaz complained about Americans: "They did not apologize. They said 'sorry.'" Some Pakistani vowed civil disobedience to stop the convoys. "The decision to reopen NATO supplies is a big crime against the country, and we will not sit silently over this," retired Lt. Gen. Hamid Gul, a leader of the Defense Council of Pakistan (a coalition of Islamic parties that includes pro-Taliban clerics and other foes of the NATO routes) and a former chief of the Inter-Services Intelligence agency, told the Pakistani cable channel Express News. "We will come to roads and streets and protest against the decision and will also try to stop the supplies." Pakistani Taliban announced that they would attack any NATO supply trucks travelling along the routes. Transporters who resume supplies will be "considered a friend of the U.S." and will face the consequences, a spokesman for the militant group said. Al Jazeera's Kamal Hyder said that both NATO and Pakistani forces had taken into account losses in the past. "The losses, despite the fact that they have become a problem are nowhere near the levels that would cause alarm bells to ring" the correspondent said. According to his analysis it would cause a problem if "the Pakistani Taliban attack bridges or decide to take these people head on in the tribal areas" connecting Pakistan to the southern Afghan province of Kandahar.

American officials said according to The New York Times that Hillary Clinton's increasingly cordial relationship with the young Pakistani foreign minister Hina Rabbani Khar paid dividends in resolving the dispute between both countries over the Salala incident. A final agreement on the wording of Clinton's statement of her conversation with Khar came after a week of marathon talks that included two trips to Islamabad by General John R. Allen, the US commander in Afghanistan, and a quickly arranged weekend trip by Thomas R. Nides, the deputy secretary of state for management and resources. Weeks later Nides and Pakistani Finance Minister Abdul Hafeez Shaikh had spearheaded the negotiations to reopen the supply lines. After weeks of behind-the-scenes phone calls, e-mails and meetings between Nides and Abdul Hafeez Shaikh reached an agreement on the terms for the reopening of the NATO supply lines. Besides the US apology both sides agreed to the following: After initially demanding as much as $5,000 for each truck Pakistan dropped its insistence on a higher transit fee for each truck carrying NATO's nonlethal supplies from Pakistan into Afghanistan and agreed to keep the fee at the current rate of $250. The Obama Administration would ask Congress to reimburse Pakistan about $1.2 billion for costs incurred by 150,000 Pakistani troops carrying out counterinsurgency operations along the border with Afghanistan. "With the GLOCs open, we will look to pay past coalition support fund claims," Pentagon spokesman Captain John Kirby said, using a Pentagon acronym for the supply routes. The United States military reimburses by "coalition support funds" Pakistan for logistical, military and other support provided to American military operations against militants, but these payments have been suspended since Pakistan shut off the routes. More precisely the US halted paying the bills from Pakistan as tensions rose between the two countries.

During their telephone call Pakistani Foreign Minister Hina Rabbani Khar made it clear to Secretary of State Clinton that no lethal equipment would transit into Afghanistan through the Ground Lines of Communication i.e. the ground supply lines except those meant for equipping the Afghan National Security Forces. Pakistan's Defense Committee of the Cabinet, which approved the deal, said the agreement was in the country's best interest and a boon to the Afghanistan peace process. Allowing NATO convoys to enter and exit Pakistani territory would speed the withdrawal of Western forces, the Pakistani government said in a statement, and "enable a smooth transition in Afghanistan." According to The New York Times the agreement reflected a growing realisation by Pakistani officials that they had overplayed their hand, misjudged NATO's resolve and ability to adapt to the closing by using an alternative route through Central Asia, and a recognition on both sides that the impasse risked transforming an often rocky relationship into a permanently toxic one at a critically inopportune time. Despite the resolving of the Salala incident there was friction between both countries such as Pakistan's opposition to US drone strikes on Pakistan soil, and Washington's allegations that Islamabad condoned, or even assisted, anti-American militants.

The deal ended a diplomatic deadlock that brought US relations with the nuclear-armed South Asian nation to a near standstill and hindered counter-terrorism operations against Pakistan-based militants. Because of the supply lines closure the United States had to spend at least an additional $100 million a month because it was instead forced to move supplies by air, rail or truck through Russia and other countries north of Afghanistan on much longer and more expensive routes. The closure of the supply lines complicated the American troop withdrawal from Afghanistan, cost the United States more than $1 billion in extra shipping fees as a result of having to use the alternative routes through Central Asia, and also held up delivery of thousands of armoured vehicles and other equipment meant for the fledgling Afghan army and police, slowing US efforts to build Afghan forces that could stand up to the Taliban insurgency as foreign troops withdraw. The reopening of the supply lines meant that the US would save hundreds of millions of dollars in the run-up to the withdrawal of NATO forces from the Afghanistan and also that it would help the US and NATO to complete its withdrawal of troops from Afghanistan "at a much lower cost" according to Clinton. Despite the reopening of critical supply routes from Pakistan, the US military confronted a giant logistical challenge to wind down the war in Afghanistan because it had to withdraw 90,000 troops by the end of 2014 on top of enormous depots of military equipment accumulated over a decade of war which included 100,000 shipping containers stuffed with materiel and 50,000 wheeled vehicles.

The above-mentioned agreement between Pakistan and the United States was never an issue of money alone. "It was a matter of honor for the army," said Laiq ur-Rehman, a Pakistani defence correspondent for ARY News, a cable channel. "The only word they were looking for was 'sorry.' It was a matter of pride, a matter of honor, a matter of ego." "If it had been about the money, it would have been done months ago," said a US senior administration official knowledgeable about the negotiations. "Just like for us, it was not just about the supply routes." According to the BBC the reason for the long US refusal to apologise for the Salala incident was deep anger among Americans about the death of US soldiers in Afghanistan from attacks by militant groups with alleged connections to Pakistan's ISI intelligence agency. Another reason for the United States refusal to apologise was the determination by American military investigators that Pakistan was equally culpable in the Salala incident because Pakistani soldiers, stationed on a ridge overlooking the border, had fired first on US troops on the Afghan side of the border. Pakistan has disputed that conclusion, saying its forces did not fire first.

After the first NATO supply trucks crossed the Afghan border on 5 June 2012, Pakistanis questioned the NATO supply line deal. "The US has not apologized formally," said Nawaz Sharif, the leader of the main opposition party Pakistan Muslim League-Nawaz. Imran Khan, another major opposition figure, went further, saying that "the decision isn't only against national interest but can also stir unrest within the ranks of the armed forces." He also criticised the incumbent government as being a pawn of the United States. Political and religious parties in Pakistan undertook "long marches" to Islamabad to protest reopening of supply routes to Afghanistan. Pakistan declared it would scan all NATO containers passing through the country to ensure they did not contain weapons which would be seized. 560,000 rupees ($6,000) compensation per vehicle would be paid to the truck owners by NATO subcontractors for being out of work for seven months because of the blockade according to Rana Mohammad Aslam, vice-president of the All Pakistan Goods Carrier Association.

=== Shamsi airfield vacated ===
On 26 November, the same day the incident occurred, Pakistan ordered the US to shut down and vacate the Shamsi Airfield in the southwestern Balochistan province within a deadline of 15 days. US forces and the Central Intelligence Agency had reportedly leased the airbase in 2001 for joint surveillance and launching drone attacks against militants in Afghanistan and northwestern Pakistan. The Shamsi airbase was the only military base in Pakistan being used by the United States, and orders of its evacuation by US personnel symbolised an increasing rift and deterioration in relations between Pakistan and the United States.

In early December, the US military personnel occupying the base, along with all military equipment, were shifted to the Bagram Air Base in Afghanistan via US military aircraft. On 10 December, Pakistani troops from the Frontier Corps took full control of the airfield as scheduled, and by 11 December all remaining American staff were evacuated. Upon establishing control of the airfield, the United States flag was removed from the base and replaced with the flag of Pakistan.

The impact of the closure has been questioned, as the United States still had the ability to conduct drone attacks from nearby bases in Afghanistan, and according to the Pakistani military, the base was used mainly for refuelling and maintenance of drones, as well as for emergency landings and logistical support, and not for conducting actual drone operations which had in fact ceased in April 2011. Following the incident, Pakistan stated its intention to shoot down any future US drones intruding on its airspace, and the US suspended drone operations to avoid antagonising Pakistan. One report said that American drone attacks in Pakistan dropped by as much as 50% due to the Salala attack, as well as legal cases.

=== United States exit strategy ===
Among the immediate repercussions of the incident was that the United States' attempts to end the war in Afghanistan peacefully were put in jeopardy. Some Pakistani officials warned that the attack could have "huge implications" for the Afghan endgame. Pakistan, which is designated as a major non-NATO ally by the United States and is seen as a key facilitator in bringing the United States to the negotiations table with the Afghan Taliban and the Haqqani Network, had already halted those efforts according to an unnamed Pakistani official close to the military establishment.

While addressing a Senate committee, the Minister of Foreign Affairs Hina Rabbani Khar warned that a repeat incident could end Pakistan's support to the United States in its war against militancy. "Enough is enough. The government will not tolerate any incident of spilling even a single drop of any civilian or soldier's blood. Pakistan's role in the War on Terror must not be overlooked." She added that "the sacrifices rendered by Pakistan in the war on terror are more than any other country. But that does not mean we will compromise on our sovereignty."

=== Pakistan's refusal to attend Bonn Conference ===
In the wake of the NATO attacks, the Pakistani government refused to attend the Bonn conference scheduled on 5 December 2011. The event in Bonn, Germany is an important international conference on Afghanistan. International pressure over Pakistan mounted as it refused to attend the Bonn conference. Secretary Hillary Clinton contacted the Pakistani Prime Minister but her plea was rejected because Pakistani public opinion prohibited attendance. The conference was generally regarded as a disappointment, partially because of Pakistan's absence.

=== Revision of western-border rules of engagement ===
Pakistan also strengthened its air defences and surveillance along the Afghanistan border as a precaution against any future incursions. DGMO Major General Ashaq Nadeem was quoted saying "We can expect more attacks from our supposed allies". Pakistan's army chief General Ashfaq Parvez Kayani issued directions to commanders posted at the border to fire without permission if any further aggression is received. According to a Pakistani security official, Pakistan had upgraded to a "fully equipped air defence system" on the Afghan border which had the capability of detecting, tracing and shooting down any aircraft. These weapons notably included indigenous shoulder-to-air Anza Mk-III missiles and anti-aircraft guns. The Pakistan Air Force cancelled leave for all its air reconnaissance-related personnel and deployed aircraft to start a round-the-clock combat air patrol over the Afghan border to prevent all intrusions including drone attacks.

== Reactions ==
The already fractured relationship between Pakistan and the United States fell to a new low following the incident, with the Pakistani government and military establishment reassessing their diplomatic, political, military and intelligence relationship with the United States.

=== Government and military ===
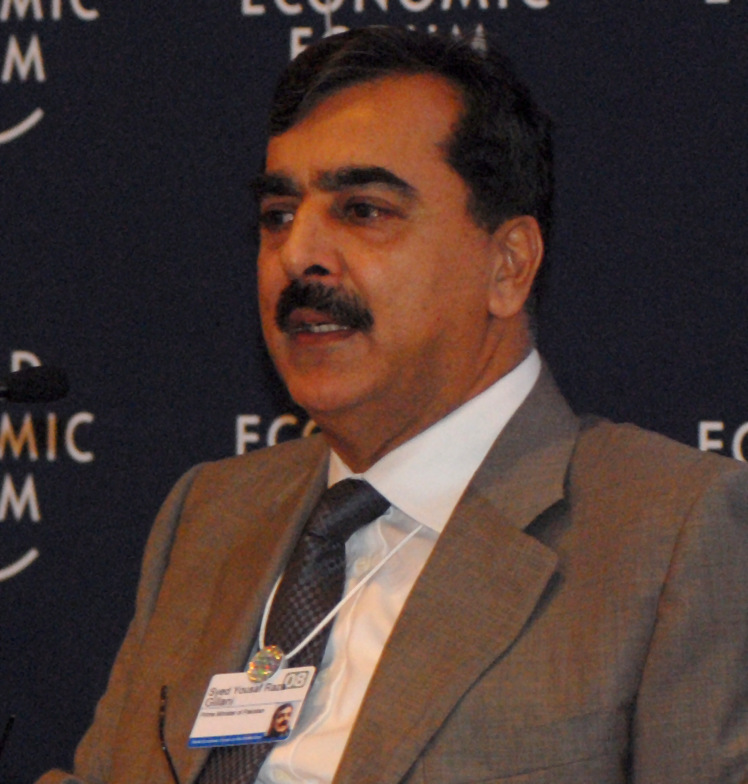
Following the incident, Prime Minister Gillani called for a review of Pakistan's relationship with NATO and the United States.

The Foreign Ministry of Pakistan promptly lodged a protest with US ambassador to Pakistan Cameron Munter following the attack. In an official phone call to the United States, Foreign Minister Hina Rabbani Khar said that the attacks demonstrated "complete disregard for international law and human life" and were "in stark violation of Pakistani sovereignty." Sentiments within the Pakistani military leadership suggested the attack as being a pre-planned plot that was executed deliberately and intentionally.

Retired Brigadier Mahmood Shah, former chief of security in the tribal areas, said that so far the US has blamed Pakistan for all that is happening in Afghanistan and Pakistan's point of view has not been shown in the international media, so the matter should be taken up by the United Nations Security Council. He advised Pakistani authorities to shoot down NATO aircraft should a similar event take place in the future, and to keep the supply lines closed, on the argument that the US cannot afford a war with Pakistan. The Inter Services Public Relations (ISPR), a media wing of the Pakistani military, released a statement calling the attack unprovoked and said that chief of army staff, General Ashfaq Parvez Kayani had called the incident unacceptable and "directed that all necessary steps be under taken for an effective response to this irresponsible act".

General Ahmad Shuja Pasha, emerged as fiercely hostile to Washington in his final year engaging in "shouting matches" with then CIA director Leon Panetta, cutting cooperation down to a minimum, ordering the harassment of U.S. diplomats in Pakistan and locking up CIA blackwater and agent Shakil Afridi in Pakistan.

The Pakistani Senate passed a unanimous resolution which denounced the attack and called it contrary to United Nations resolutions and international laws. Pakistan's Interior Minister Rehman Malik commented on the issue clarifying that the supply lines have not been suspended, rather been permanently shut down and the trucks would not be allowed to cross the Pakistan-Afghanistan border. The Minister of Information and Broadcasting Firdous Ashiq Awan urged the international community to condemn the incident to prevent such incidents in the future. The Governor of Khyber Pakhtunkhwa, Masood Kausar, termed the air strike as "deliberate" and asserted that claims over the incident being accidental were untrue. He also blamed the instability in neighbouring Afghanistan as a cause of instability in Pakistan.

The televised funeral ceremony of the soldiers who died was held in Peshawar and was attended by several high-level military and political figures, including the Chief of Army Staff. Afterwards, their bodies were dispatched to their native towns for burial. The soldiers hailed from various regions, including three from Azad Kashmir alone, while the Major was from Larkana and the Captain from Sahiwal. Family members of Major Mujahid Mirani and Captain Usman Ali said the soldiers "sacrificed their lives" for the country and that they were proud of those sacrifices. The Army Chief later also paid a visit to the injured soldiers, who had been transported to the Combined Military Hospital (CMH) in Peshawar.

On 28 November 2011, referring to Pak-US military, intelligence, political and diplomatic co-operation, the Pakistani Prime Minister announced that there would be no more business with the US and the relations between the two countries would never be the same again. Later the Director General of ISPR, Abbas, announced that NATO's apology was not accepted and the attack would have serious consequences. He said that NATO's regret over the attack was not enough and such incidents had happened in the past, killing 72 soldiers and injuring more than 250 troops in three years. While addressing a gathering of journalists at a military headquarters, Pakistan Army Major-General Ashfaq Nadeem described the Salala incident as a "deliberate act of aggression" and said it was "next to impossible" that NATO did not know they were attacking Pakistani forces.

The next day, Pakistan's ambassador to the UN, Hussain Haroon wrote to a letter to the UN Secretary General Ban Ki-moon to inform him of the situation and requested that the statement be forwarded to the 193-nation general assembly and the 15-nation security council (UNSC) as a UNSC document.

Commenting on drone attacks, a senior Pakistani official said that predator drones "will never be allowed back, at Shamsi or anywhere else" although he hinted that American military trainers may be allowed back into the country to train Pakistani security forces. Pakistan had previously dumped American security personnel out of the country, following a covert operation by US special forces that killed Osama bin Laden in the town of Abbottabad in May 2011 and strained Pakistan's relations with the United States. As of January 2012, foreign affairs minister Hina Rabbani Khar said Pakistan's ties with the United States were "still on hold" over the NATO air-attack and that until the re-evaluation was not complete, Washington could not ask Islamabad to pursue militant groups or assist in the Afghan peace process.

I would like the American public to consider what their reaction would have been if American troops had been killed in such an attack on their border with Mexico.

— Bilawal Bhutto Zardari, chairman of the Pakistan Peoples Party

In May 2012, Bilawal Bhutto Zardari, son of President Zardari and chairman of the Pakistan Peoples Party, toughened his stance when he called on President Obama to "show some courage" and "apologise to Pakistan" over the raid. Ridiculing US demands for Islamabad to "do more" in the Afghanistan war, Bilawal remarked "it is time for the US to do more". He called US drone operations a "constant irritant" to Pakistani public opinion and questioned whether the United States "actually considered Pakistan a military ally", citing other controversial events such as the Abbottabad operation and the Raymond Davis incident. He also remarked that while he understood Obama was facing a re-election, "the future of the NATO mission in Afghanistan should be more important than poll numbers".

=== Opposition political parties ===
I know that the government will not do anything except issue some silly comments against brutality even after this attack. I do not issue comments, I believe in taking action.

— Imran Khan, leader of the Pakistan Tehreek-e-Insaf

A PML (N) politician remarked that the government's incompetence had allowed the attack to be carried out. Imran Khan, a popular opposition politician and former cricketer who has been a long-time staunch critic of the government's foreign policy and its decision to join the American-led War on Terror, called the attack unpardonable during a political rally in Multan, and said the Pakistani government had wasted $70 billion belonging to the Pakistani people, as well as the lives of 40,000 people, on fighting a counter-productive American war: "I know that the government will not do anything except issue some silly comments against brutality even after this attack. I do not issue comments, I believe in taking action." An Awami National Party politician and senator called the incident a terrorist attack. Awami Muslim League party leader Sheikh Rashid Ahmed supported a blockade of NATO supplies "to teach an unforgettable lesson to USA and NATO forces for violating Pakistani soil." MQM chief Altaf Hussain condemned the attack and directed his party to observe a "Stability and Solidarity Day". Former president Pervez Musharraf heavily criticised the attack while giving a telephonic conference to the Karachi Press Club and advised the government to take strict measures at a diplomatic level. Many other leaders also called on the government to pull out of the war in Afghanistan and disassociate itself from the U.S. alliance. The JUI called the attack a "shameful incident" and "a slap across the face of Pakistani foreign policy" adopted by rulers who "always bow before their foreign masters." Protesters affiliated with the right-wing Jamaat-ud-Dawa held a rally outside the Lahore Press Club where they urged the Pakistan Army to give a "befitting response" to NATO; the leader of the party said "We have to eliminate all stations and bases given to the CIA if we want to end terrorism in Pakistan".

=== Public and media ===
External images
- Maj. Mujahid and Capt. Usman, The two commanders of the post killed in the attack.
- Military honours being given to the killed soldiers, Soldiers get military honours wrapped in Pakistani flag.
- Killed soldiers' funeral, dead bodies being taken to the funeral ground.
- Funeral prayer for killed soldiers, Combined funeral prayer being offered for the soldiers killed in the NATO attack.
- Public protests, Public wreaks havoc protesting to the attack and calling the military to take action.

The NATO attack received considerable criticism and caused widespread outrage among the country's civil society and media, with some perceiving it as an intentional act of war that may have been pre-planned. Numerous protests were organised in several cities for a number of consecutive days after the attack occurred. Members of the public demanded an end to the US alliance and pressurised the government to consider pulling out from the War on Terror, permanently halt all NATO supplies, expel American citizens in Pakistan and plan a tit-for-tat military retaliation. Some locals in the tribal agencies demanded those who carried out the attack to be handed over to Pakistan. Hundreds of people organised a gathering outside the American consulate in Karachi to lodge a protest. Various lawyers' associations throughout the country boycotted their usual court proceedings and observed a strike to mark the day. Many university students also boycotted their classes to protest. Students in Peshawar blocked a main road where they chanted "Quit the war on terror" and other anti-American slogans. Schoolteachers and students in Azad Kashmir expressed their outrage during a protest in the capital Muzaffarabad. Protests were also organised in the northern towns of Skardu in Gilgit-Baltistan and Chitral. Some faculty members of the University of the Punjab, the country's oldest university, passed a "resolution" in which they backed the Pakistan Army, stating that "Pakistan does not want war, but war is being imposed on it" and said the War on Terror was a "drama" staged by the "US elite" and a certain group of rich international bankers referred to as the "high cabal" by Winston Churchill who wanted to establish a "world government". The Federation of Pakistan Chamber of Commerce & Industry condemned the attack as well. Local television cable operators pulled out western channels such as BBC World News to deter what they called "anti-Pakistan bias" in the media. Leaders of Pakistani Christian communities also condemned the attack and pledged their support for the armed forces along with calling for a UN inquiry; speaking on the occasion, the president of the Pakistan Catholic Bishops' Conference said: "Our soldiers lost their lives in the line of duty. They died fighting terrorism". Religious leaders and scholars of the Hindu, Sikh, Muslim, Christian and Baháʼí communities also condemned the incident during an inter-faith meeting.

=== Reaction by the US and NATO ===
The White House released a statement in which it said that senior American officials had expressed their condolences to Pakistan and that the officials expressed "our desire to work together to determine what took place, and our commitment to the U.S.-Pakistan partnership which advances our shared interests, including fighting terrorism in the region". US Secretary of State Hillary Clinton, and Defense Secretary Leon Panetta spoke to their Pakistani counterparts to give their "deepest condolences" in a joint statement and also supported a NATO investigation. The commander of the International Security Assistance Force is "personally paying the highest attention" to the matter. The Obama administration pledged co-operation with Pakistan and ordered a full investigation and inquiry to be conducted into the attack. A few days later after the incident, President Barack Obama personally phoned President Asif Ali Zardari to express his sorrow over the deaths of the soldiers and, according to a press release, "made it clear that this regrettable incident was not a deliberate attack on Pakistan and reiterated the United States' strong commitment to a full investigation." while stopping short of offering a formal apology.

A NATO spokesman said that NATO "regrets the loss of life of any Pakistani servicemen".

On 27 November 2011, NATO issued an apology for what it called a "tragic unintended incident". In addition, NATO chief Anders Fogh Rasmussen is reported to have written to Prime Minister Yousuf Raza Gilani commenting that "the deaths of Pakistani personnel are as unacceptable and deplorable as the deaths of Afghan and international personnel". "We have a joint interest in the fight against cross-border terrorism and in ensuring that Afghanistan does not once again become a safe haven for terrorists," Rasmussen was quoted as saying.

The US Chief of Army Staff, General Martin Dempsey, said Pakistan's anger was justified as it had a reason to be furious given the loss of life. However, Dempsey did not apologise, saying he did not know enough about the incident and an inquiry was still being conducted. A senior advisor to Afghan President Hamid Karzai warned that Pakistan and Afghanistan may be on a course toward military conflict. Hamid Karzai contacted the Pakistani Prime Minister to discuss the NATO strike and gave his condolences over the deaths of soldiers.

The commander of the International Security Assistance Force (ISAF), General John R. Allen, presented condolences to the family members and loved ones of the dead soldiers and ordered a "thorough investigation" into the matter. NATO chief Anders Fogh Rasmussen wrote to Pakistan's Prime Minister to say "the deaths of Pakistani personnel are... unacceptable and deplorable."

At the same time, US senators such as John McCain and Lindsey Graham said the United States needed to "fully review" its ties with Pakistan and consider enforcing cuts or new restrictions to military and economic aid, in response to attacks on American soldiers in Afghanistan which the United States accuses of having links to Pakistani intelligence agencies.

I would like to extend my most sincere condolences to the people and government of Pakistan, and especially to Pakistan's men and women in uniform, for the tragic incident that took place on 26 November in Mohmand Agency. My thoughts and prayers are with the families of the men who died. Hamey bohat afsos hay (we are deeply saddened).

— Cameron Munter, US ambassador to Pakistan

Dennis J. Kucinich, a US Congressman from Ohio, said while speaking at an event organised by the Association of Physicians of Pakistani Descent of North America (APPNA) that the United States must apologise to Pakistan and pay reparations to the families of the soldiers, adding: "I'm aware of complexities around US-Pakistan relations, but you are our brothers and sisters, and we need to help facilitate those who want to take care of people here."

The US embassy in Islamabad released a video statement on YouTube featuring Ambassador Cameron Munter standing in front of the American and Pakistani flags, in which he expressed his regrets for the attack. Giving his condolences, Munter said the United States took the attack "very seriously" and pledged "a full, in-depth investigation." He also pointed out that Pakistan and the United States had been friends for over 60 years and that having "weathered previous crises together", he was certain they would both "weather this one too" to emerge as stronger partners.

=== International reaction ===
==== By country ====
- China: The Chinese Ministry of Foreign Affairs held a 40-minute telephone conversation with the Pakistani foreign affairs minister and released a statement afterwards in which it expressed China had "strong concerns" and was "deeply shocked" over the attack and maintained that "Pakistan's independence, sovereignty and territorial integrity should be respected."

During the first week of January 2012, Chief of Army Staff General Ashfaq Parvez Kayani left for an official five-day visit to China, a close ally of Pakistan, at the invitation of the Chinese leadership. According to military sources, the army chief was expected to meet the Chinese president and prime minister alongside top security officials, and a focal agenda of the meeting included discussions on the NATO incident, a briefing by Kayani on rewriting terms of engagement with the US, as well as security co-operation between China and Pakistan. Commenting on the occasion, a security official said: "We want to take our relationship with China to the next level".
In a meeting with US officials in the aftermath of the attack, Chinese general Ma Xiaotian hearkened back to the US bombing of the Chinese Embassy in Belgrade in 1999 (which the US blamed on faulty maps, but which the Chinese suspected was deliberate), jibing "Were you using the wrong maps again?" Observers took this to indicate that the embassy bombing still grated on Beijing and affected China-United States relations.

- Denmark: The foreign minister of Denmark, Villy Sovndal, sent an official letter to convey condolences on the dead soldiers. Sovndal said "Pakistan has already suffered enormous casualties with tens of thousands civilians and service personnel being killed by militants during the last 10 years. No country is so hard hit as Pakistan. It calls for our deepest sympathy and solidarity."
- France: A spokesman for the French Foreign Ministry said France extended its condolences for the "tragic and regrettable events that led to the death of at least 26 Pakistani soldiers" and called for co-operation with the Pakistani government in addition to lending support for an inquiry into the facts behind the incident.
- Germany: Guido Westerwelle, Foreign Minister of Germany, deplored the attack during a telephone call to Pakistan and said he supported an investigation into it.
- Iran: Major General Mohammad Ali Jafari, commander of the Islamic Revolutionary Guard Corps, condemned the NATO air raid in a message to Pakistan's Chief of Army Staff: "There is no doubt that the horrible crime was in violation of international laws and regulations which once again unmasked the true face of the so-called advocates of peace and human rights". In addition, some 224 Iranian parliamentarians issued a joint statement in which they condemned the attack and encouraged Islamabad to show a "decisive move" to "prevent the United States' future crimes and violation of Pakistan's territorial integrity".
- Italy: Italian foreign minister Giulio Terzi contacted Pakistani foreign minister Hina Rabbani Khar, during which he condoled the loss of lives, terming the incident a matter of " huge concern." Terzi commented that Pakistan was a major stakeholder in resolving stability in Afghanistan and that its presence would be greatly missed in the upcoming Bonn conference.
- Russia: The Russian foreign minister stated it is unacceptable to violate the sovereignty of a state, even when planning and carrying out counter-insurgent operations. In January 2012, reports emerged that Pakistani foreign minister Hina Rabbani Khar was set to leave for Moscow in the first half of February to formally invite Russian president Dmitry Medvedev to pay a state visit to Pakistan. If Medvedev had accepted the invitation, It would have been the first Russian head of state to visit the country. This move was believed to be part of changes in Pakistan's foreign policy which include efforts to open up relations with other regional powers following strains in relations with the United States.
- Sri Lanka: Thousands of Sri Lankan protesters attended a gathering in a public square in Colombo organised by the Pakistan Sri Lanka Friendship Association and the National Freedom Front (a political party and ally of the ruling coalition government), condemning the NATO's actions and asking the US to "stop terrorizing Pakistan". The attendees included several high-profile Sri Lankan government officials, as well as journalists, government employees, lawyers and members of the civil society. Members of the Sri Lankan Muslim community and the Pakistani community in Sri Lanka were present. During the same gathering, protesters also criticised the United States for pushing an inquiry into the conduct of the Sri Lankan Armed Forces in the recently ended civil war against Tamil insurgents.
- Turkey: The Turkish Minister for Foreign Affairs Ahmet Davutoğlu telephoned Pakistan and called the attack "unprovoked and totally unacceptable". Davutoğlu assured that as a member of NATO, Turkey will ask for an impartial inquiry into the attacks. He further added that the loss of the Pakistani soldiers was "as painful as losing Turkish soldiers".
- United Arab Emirates: Sheikh Abdullah bin Zayed Al Nahyan, the Foreign Affairs Minister of the United Arab Emirates, arrived in Islamabad on an unannounced visit and requested President Asif Ali Zardari to reconsider and withdraw Pakistan's deadline set for the US to vacate the Shamsi Airbase. President Zardari is said to have rejected the request during the meeting, saying the decision was taken by the Defence Committee of the Cabinet and was in national interests. The Shamsi Airbase is believed to be under the control of the UAE, which leased it in the 1990s for facilitating visits of wealthy Arabs who used to visit Pakistan for falconry and hunting trips. The UAE is reportedly the party which allowed the US to use the air base for military purposes.

==== Organisations ====
- United Nations: The office of the Security Council's president, Ambassador Jose Filipe Moraes Cabral of Portugal, submitted Mr. Haroon's letter for their information as well as the DCC statement, to be issued as a document of the UNSC. UN is still awaited for further comments.
- Organisation of Islamic Cooperation (OIC): The Secretary General of the Organization of Islamic Cooperation (OIC) Ekmeleddin Ihsanoglu condemned the NATO attacks and gave his condolences to the relatives of the dead soldiers. Ihsanoglu said the attacks were a "serious violation of Pakistan's sovereignty and are totally unacceptable" and expressed solidarity with Pakistan.
- European Union: Catherine Ashton offered her condolences for the deaths and said: "We underline the EU's commitment to continue its engagement with Pakistan in pursuit of the shared goals of promoting peace, security and prosperity. Pakistan is a vital partner in the region and has an essential role to play in the resolution of the Afghan conflict."
- Syed Ali Shah Geelani, leader of the separatist Tehreek-e-Hurriyat party in Indian-administered Kashmir said during a telephone address that Pakistan was facing problems due to its alliance with the United States.
- The Pakistan-based terrorist group Tehrik-i-Taliban (TTP) said NATO's attack on Pakistani check posts proved that the US "can never be a friend of Pakistan" and said Pakistan ought to take revenge for the incident and cut off its ties with the USA. A TTP spokesperson maintained that no peace talks were being held with the government of Pakistan.

==== Third parties ====
John Rees, a British socialist and anti-war political activist, called the NATO attack an "extremely dangerous incursion" and argued that the US and its allies were creating instability in the nuclear-armed country.

Australian analyst Brian Cloughley said the attack would have severe consequences: "This is quite outrageous and I have no doubt it signifies the end of the last lingering shreds of trust that the Pakistani army had for the U.S.". According to Coughley, the USAF had full knowledge of the locations of Pakistani border posts, and thus there was no excuse for this incident.

An article from the Asia Times by M K Bhadrakumar explains that US should learn from its experience with Iran. It has no answer to a resolute nation in its will to put up against an enemy and Pakistan is going to give a "Persian response" this time if the intention was to intimidate its army. According to Bhadrakumar, Pakistan's calculated response following the attack stops short of directly terminating its participation in the war although in essence, this event may push Pakistan's army "within inches of doing that" in the long-term scenario.

A report published in the newspaper Pakistan Observer claimed that some military and defence observers at Islamabad believed NATO was playing a double game and was in league with the Tehrik-i-Taliban; according to the report, there was a theory being circulated which suggested that the attack carried out by NATO came just when some Tehrik-i-Taliban (TTP) militants from Afghanistan who had entered the region had been completely encircled by Pakistani forces and were about to be eliminated "within the next few hours". These check posts were there to check them and prevent from crossing the border into Pakistan. Pakistani monitors and experts on Afghanistan believed that at least two Afghan military officials deployed on the border, Brigadier General Aminullah Amarkhel and Colonel Numan Hatifi (of the 201st Silab Corps), have anti-Pakistan sentiments and links to anti-Pakistani elements.

An article published in People's Daily, China's top state newspaper, accused the United States and NATO of flouting international law and fanning terrorism. Simultaneously, many Chinese scholars, analysts and members of leading think tanks also expressed strong criticism of NATO's attack. A former spokesperson for the US state department said China, which is a close ally of Pakistan, "sees this as a target of opportunity, both to tweak the US and to subtly suggest to Pakistan that if it really sours of its relationship with the US, it has an alternative".

Writing for the Pakistani newspaper Express Tribune, Indian blogger Sanjay Kumar said the attack had elicited various reactions in India, with some vocal sections who saw Islamabad in "the prism of prejudice and paranoia" expressing glee and delight at the discomfort and supposed humiliation of their arch-rival western neighbour. Kumar opinionated that "such sick thought has many takers in this healthy democracy which prides itself as the voice of the third world countries". An opinion piece by Abdul Rauf Colachal published on the Indian Muslim Observer titled "NATO terrorism in Pakistan" said that Pakistan's leadership was "interested mainly in promoting US imperialist goals and western capitalist interests" rather than protecting the interests of its people.

== Gallantry awards ==
Recipients of the Sitara-e-Jurat:

- Major Mujahid Ali Mirani Shaheed.

Recipients of the Tamgha-e-Basalat:

- Captain Usman Ali Shaheed.

== See also ==
- Pakistan–United States skirmishes
- Pakistan–United States military relations
- Drone strikes in Pakistan
  - List of drone strikes in Pakistan
