= Salala, Pakistan =

Ridge in FATA, Pakistan

Salala is a ridge in the Baizai subdivision of Mohmand Agency, FATA, Pakistan on the border with Afghanistan, at approximately 34.5 deg N, 71 deg E, 40 km west of the Mohmand capital of Ghallanai The ridge contains two Pakistani Frontier Corps checkpoints.

The area came under international attention in November 2011 following a NATO attack at Pakistani army checkpoints on the Salala mountain or ridge which killed 28 Pakistani soldiers.
