= Baizai =

Pakistani administrative area

Baizai بائزئی
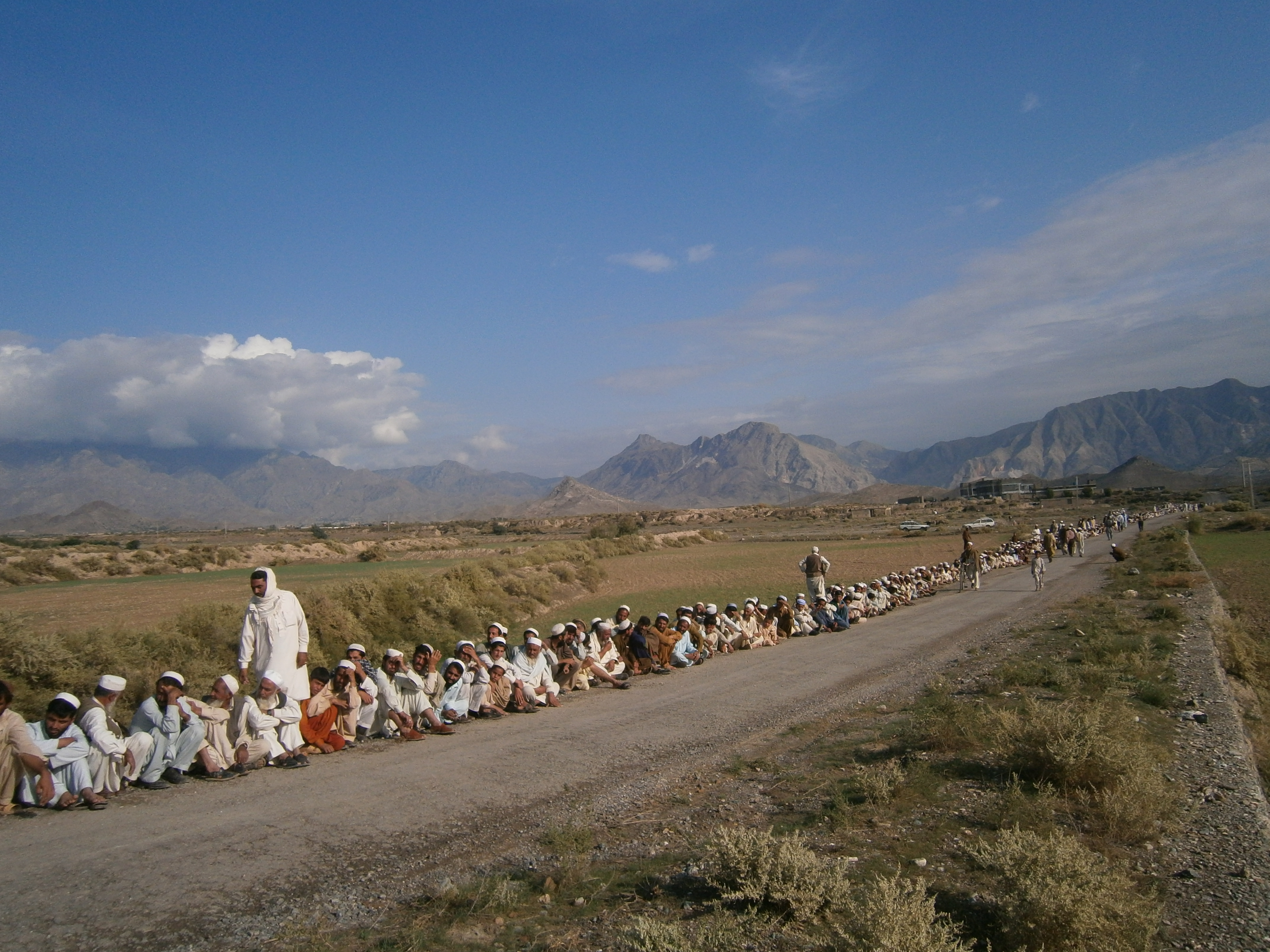
- Country: Pakistan
- Region: Federally Administered Tribal Areas
- District: Mohmand Agency
- Tehsil: Upper Mohmand

Government
  - Type: Tehsil-council
  - Chairman: Bismillah Jan (JUI-F)

Population (2017)
  - Total: 8,284
- Time zone: UTC+5 (PST)
  - Summer (DST): UTC+6 (PDT)

Baizai (Urdu: بائزئی) is a sub-Division the Mohmand District, Khyber Pakhtunkhwa, Pakistan. It comprises two tehsils: Baizai and Khewezai.

It is predominantly inhabited by Pashtuns, mainly from the five major tribes: Mero Khel, Attmar Khel, Essa Khel, Mosa Khel, Khoaga Khel, and Barakhel.

In November 2011, Baizai gained media attention when US-led NATO forces attacked a Pakistani military checkpoint in Salala, resulting in the death of 26 soldiers.

== See also ==
- Daulat Khel Bangash
