= NATO logistics during the War in Afghanistan (2001–2021) =

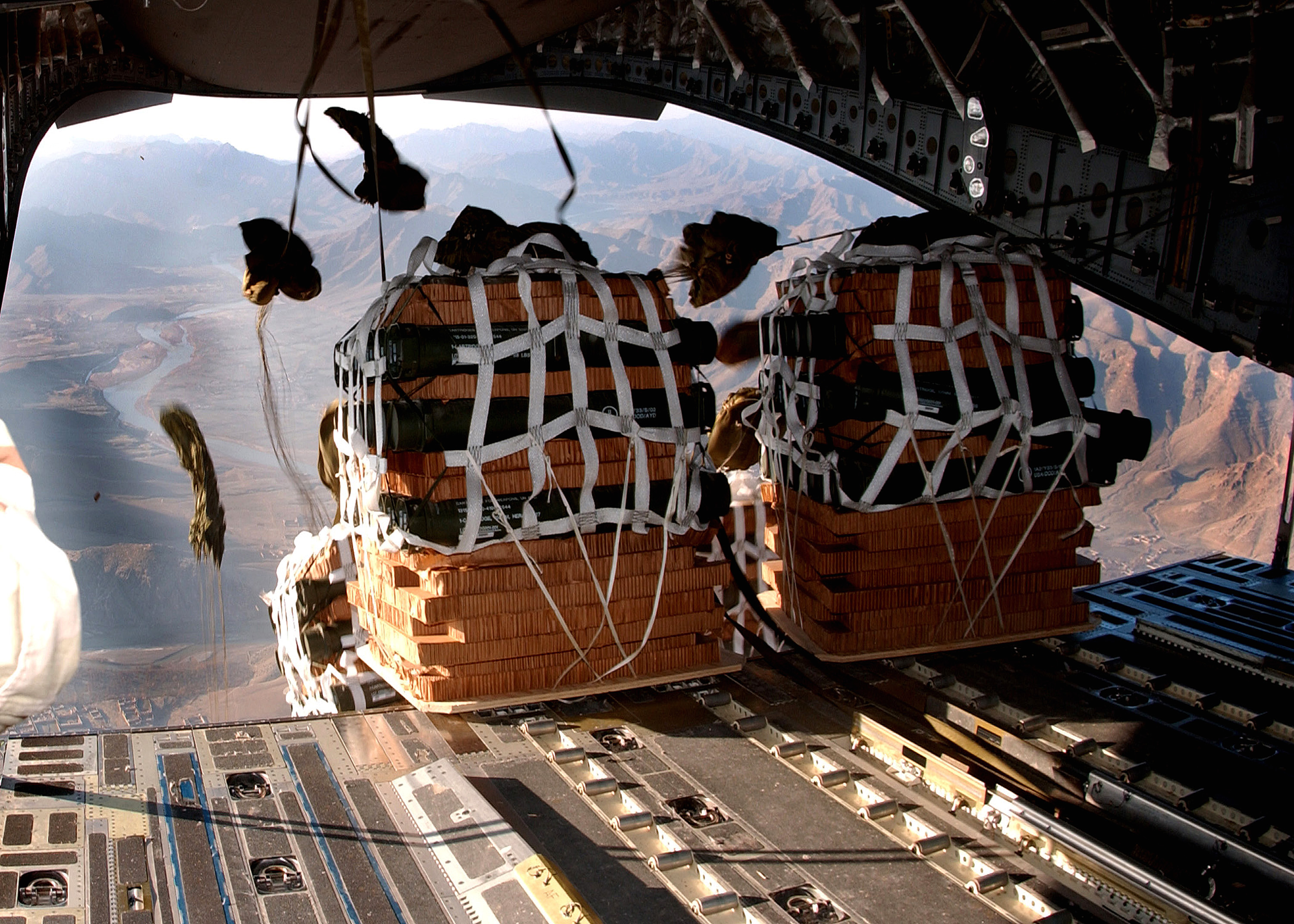
Pallets of supplies being dropped to servicemembers at a remote camp in Afghanistan. Air transport was an important part of NATO logistics in Afghanistan.

Logistics operations by NATO forces during the War in Afghanistan (2001–2021) took place under the auspices of the International Security Assistance Force from 2001 to 2014, then under the Resolute Support Mission from 2015 until 2021.

Since Afghanistan is a landlocked country, supplies had to pass through other countries in order to reach it, or else be delivered by air. Air transport was prohibitively expensive so NATO forces tended to rely on ground routes for non-lethal equipment. This was principally accomplished either by shipping goods by sea to the Pakistani port of Karachi in the southern Sindh province, or by shipping them through Russia and the Central Asian states.

== Air routes ==
Map showing NATO supply routes through Pakistan.

All munitions, whether small arms ammunition, artillery shells, or missiles, were transported by air. However, airlifting supplies costed up to ten times as much as transporting them through Pakistan. In order to reduce costs, these goods were often shipped by sea to ports in the Persian Gulf and then flown into Afghanistan. The air supply effort at the beginning of the war was the third largest in history, after the Berlin Airlift and the 1990 airlift for the Gulf War.

== Pakistan route ==
There were two routes from Pakistan to Afghanistan (both were closed in November 2011 following the Salala incident and reopened in July 2012). Both routes started in Karachi, Pakistan's principal port in its southern Sindh province, on the Arabian Sea. From there, one route crossed the Khyber Pass, entered Afghanistan at Torkham, and terminated at Kabul, supplying northern Afghanistan. This route was approximately 1,000 miles long. The other passed through Balochistan Province, crossed the border at Chaman, and ended at Kandahar, in the south of Afghanistan.

NATO used these routes to transport fuel and other supplies, but not for weapons. The Pakistan routes, until their closure, provided most of the fuel for NATO efforts in Afghanistan. In 2007, the military was burning 575,000 gallons of fuel per day, and 80% of this fuel came from Pakistani refineries. The fuel storage capacity for forces at Bagram and Kabul air bases was less than 3 million gallons, making NATO efforts highly dependent on the Pakistani supply lines. NATO began working to reduce this dependency, building an additional 3 million gallons of storage space at Bagram Air Base in fall 2007. In 2010, as a result of a deterioration in American-Pakistani relations, the American military intensified these efforts, stockpiling supplies and increasing storage capacity.

=== Incidents ===
From their inception, the Pakistani supply routes proved unreliable and vulnerable to theft and disruption by the Taliban.

In a single incident in 2008, 42 oil tankers were destroyed, and later that same year 300 militants attacked a facility in Peshawar run by Port World Logistics and set fire to 96 supply trucks and six containers.

==== 2010 suspension ====
In 2010, Pakistan suspended NATO supplies to Afghanistan for one week when a NATO helicopter killed two Pakistani soldiers within Pakistan's borders.

==== 2011 suspension ====
The incident was repeated on the Pakistan–Afghanistan border on November 26, 2011, with the killing of 24 Pakistani troops. Pakistan blocked both routes and they remained blocked till July 2012. Brigadier General Carsten Jacobson of Germany, however, stated soon afterwards that the coalition has enough supplies stockpiled to continue operations indefinitely despite the closure of the supply line. Following the closure, NATO shifted its focus to the Northern Distribution Network, and by February 2012 85% of coalition fuel supplies were being shipped through the northern routes.

In early 2012, progress was made towards the reopening of the routes, with Pakistan allowing use of its airspace for the transport of perishable food items. After reviewing the U.S.-Pakistan relations and outlining what was needed to repair the bilateral relation between both countries, the Pakistani parliament turned the decision of reopening the NATO supply lines over the government in April 2012. Due to an upcoming general election in Pakistan with widespread anti-American sentiments in the country, the Pakistani government is reluctant to reopen the lines and postponed its decision until the United States has responded positively to Pakistani demands outlined in the parliamentary recommendations such as a U.S. apology for November 2011 NATO strike on Pakistani checkposts, the bringing of those involved in the strike to justice and a stop of the U.S. drone air strikes.

Talks between Pakistan and America failed in April 2012 after Pakistan could not get an unconditional apology from America for an air strike on Pakistani checkposts along the Afghanistan-Pakistan border. The White House refused to apologize after Taliban attacks in Kabul and other cities in Afghanistan on April 15, 2012, which according to U.S. military and intelligence officials came at the direction of the Haqqani network, a group working from a base in North Waziristan in Pakistan's tribal belt. Pakistani officials said they could not open the NATO supply routes in Afghanistan without an apology. Pakistan decided to reopen the supply lines after US Secretary of State apologized on July 3, 2012, for the Salala incident. An agreement was signed on 31 July 2012 between U.S. and Pakistani officials which allowed NATO supply convoys to cross into Afghanistan from Pakistan up to the end of 2015, one year beyond the deadline for withdrawal of U.S. combat forces.

== Northern Distribution Network ==
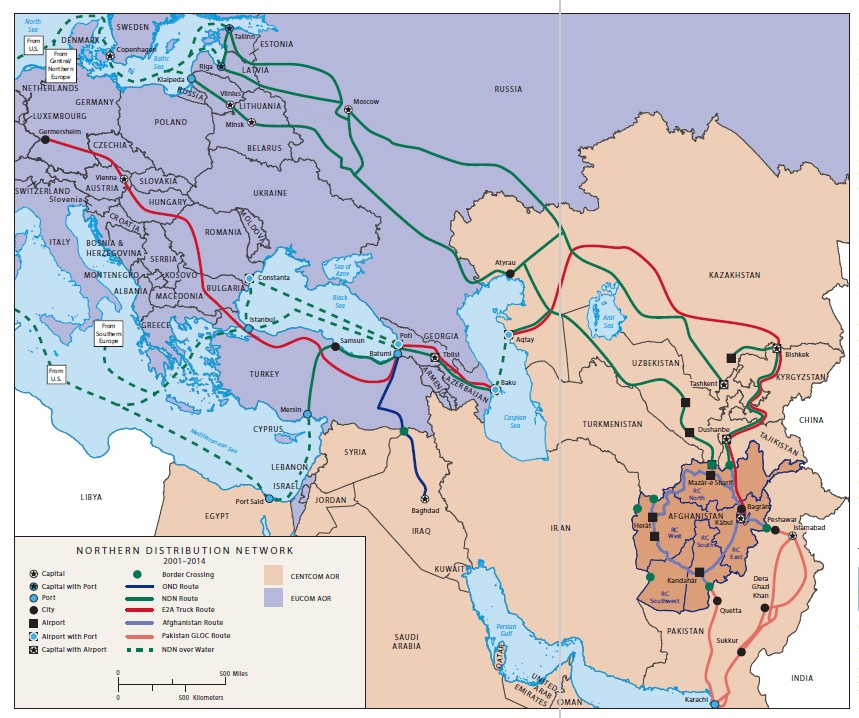
Northern Distribution Network 2001-2014

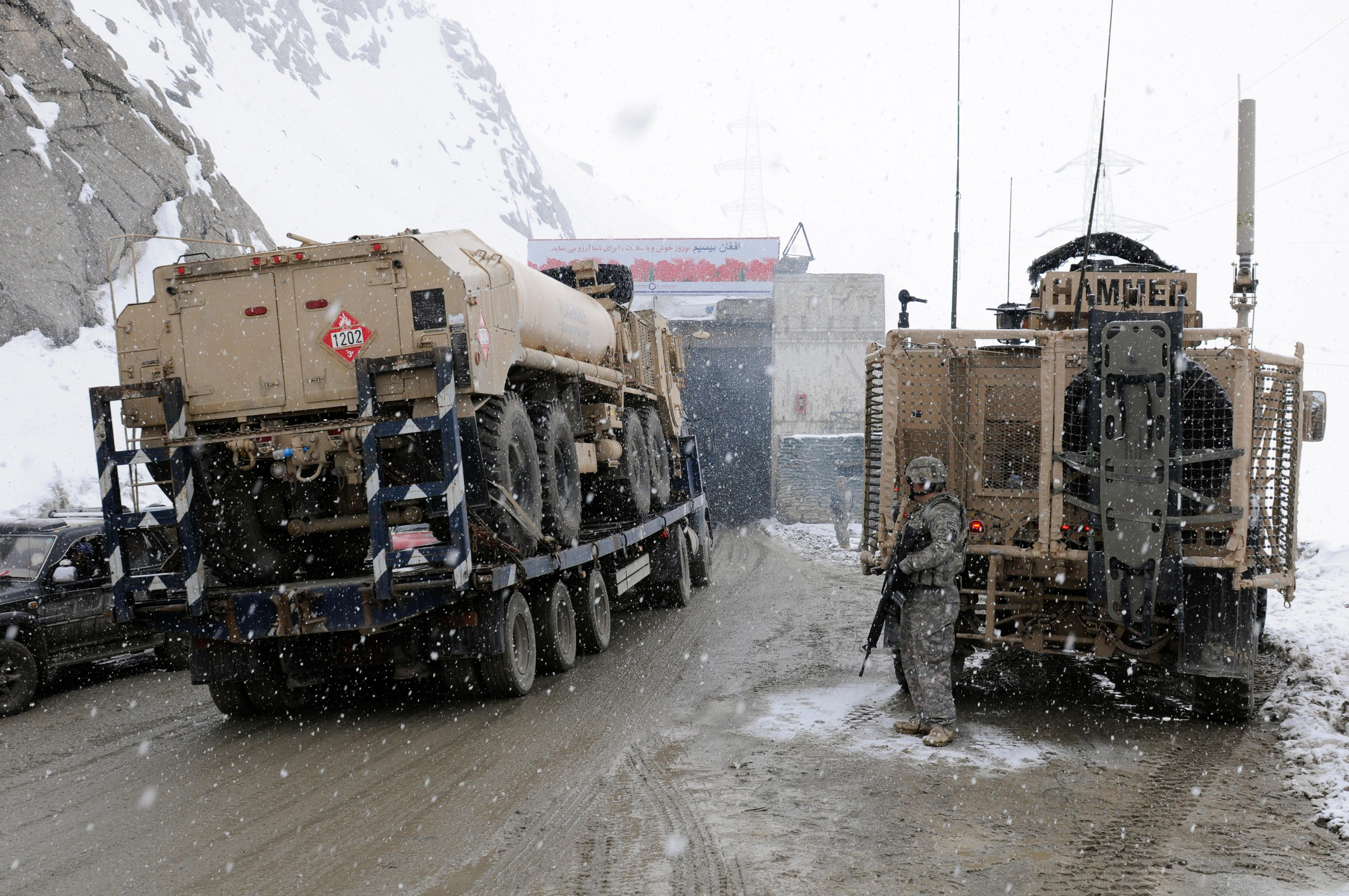
U.S. military trucks entering the Salang Tunnel

Afghanistan also borders Turkmenistan, Uzbekistan, and Tajikistan, so alternate supply routes, termed the Northern Distribution Network, existed to move supplies into Afghanistan through these countries. However, these routes were longer and costlier than the routes through Pakistan.

=== Routes ===
There were several different routes included in the Northern Distribution Network. The most commonly used route, though also one of the longest, started at the port of Riga, Latvia on the Baltic Sea, and continued for 3,212 miles (5,169 km) by train southwards through Russia, using railroads built by Russia in the 1980s for the Soviet–Afghan War. The supplies then passed through Kazakhstan and Uzbekistan before reaching Afghanistan's northern border at Termez. To get to the south of the country, the supplies had to be loaded onto trucks and transported through the mountainous Hindu Kush by means of the Salang Tunnel. The Salang Tunnel, which is the main connection between northern and southern Afghanistan, is 1.5 miles long and situated at an altitude of 11,100 feet. The route is prone to avalanches and quite dangerous.

Another, more southern route started at Poti, Georgia on the Black Sea and continued to Baku, Azerbaijan where the goods were transferred to barges and ferried across the Caspian Sea. Supplies landed in Turkmenistan and then moved by rail through Uzbekistan before arriving at the Afghan border. In 2010, this route carried one third of the NDN's traffic. Over one-third of all of the nonlethal equipment including fuel, clothing, and food used by the U.S. Department of Defense in Afghanistan traveled through Baku at one point.

A third route, created in order to avoid going through the often volatile country of Uzbekistan, went from Kazakhstan to Kyrgyzstan and then through Tajikistan before reaching Termez.

=== History ===
The Northern Distribution Network was established in 2009 in response to the increased risk of sending supplies through Pakistan. Initial permission for the U.S. military to move troop supplies through the region was given on January 20, 2009, after a visit to the region by General Petraeus. The first shipment along the NDN left on February 20, 2009. By 2011, the NDN handled about 40% of Afghanistan-bound traffic, compared to 30% through Pakistan.

On May 11, 2009, Uzbekistan president Islam Karimov announced that the airport in Navoi, Uzbekistan was being used to transport non-lethal cargo into Afghanistan. Due to the still unsettled relationship between Uzbekistan and the United States following the 2005 Andijon massacre and subsequent expulsion of U.S. forces from Karshi-Khanabad airbase, U.S. forces were not involved in the shipment of supplies. Instead, South Korea's Korean Air, which is currently involved in overhauling Navoi's airport, officially handles logistics at the site.

Originally only non-lethal resources were allowed on the NDN. In July 2009, however, shortly before a visit by President Obama to Moscow, Russian authorities announced that U.S. troops and weapons could use the country's airspace to reach Afghanistan.

Additionally, human rights advocates were concerned that the U.S. was again working with the government of Uzbekistan, which is often accused of violating human rights. Nevertheless, U.S. officials promised increased cooperation with Uzbekistan, including further assistance to turn the Navoi airport into a major regional distribution center for both military and civilian ventures.

Azerbaijan, which had sent its peacekeeping forces to be a part of ISAF, also provided its airspace and airports for transportation of vital supplies for the U.S. Army in Afghanistan. Apart from usage of Azerbaijani airspace by the U.S. Air Force, over one-third of all of the nonlethal equipment including fuel, clothing, and food used by the U.S. military in Afghanistan traveled through Baku.

After the close of the Pakistan routes in 2011, this route became the primary means of moving fuel into Afghanistan. By February 2012, 85% of the coalition's fuel supplies were transported by means of this route. It was also used for moving equipment out of Afghanistan as part of the NATO drawdown. However, the use of this line was expensive, costing $87 million per month more than when the Pakistan routes were in use. American officials projected that using the NDN for the NATO withdrawal in 2013 and 2014 would cost up to five times as much as using the Pakistan routes.

In late 2011, Afghanistan opened its first major railway line, linking Hairatan, on the Uzbek border, with Mazar-i-Sharif. If successful, this project would greatly increase the efficacy of the NDN, because goods arriving by train would no longer have to be unloaded and put on trucks before entering Afghanistan.

After Pakistan closed its borders to supplies coming in and equipment and material leaving Afghanistan in the wake of the Salala incident the NATO alliance in Afghanistan began using the northern distribution route almost immediately as alternative supply routes. In early June 2012 NATO signed deals with Kazakhstan, Uzbekistan and Kyrgyzstan to use their territory for evacuating vehicles and military equipment from Afghanistan. "We reached agreement on reverse transit from Afghanistan with three Central Asian partners: Kazakhstan, Kyrgyzstan and Uzbekistan," Nato Secretary-General Anders Fogh Rasmussen said at a news conference on June 4, 2012. "These agreements will give us a range of new options and the robust and flexible transport network we need," he said, without offering more detail on the accords. In addition a deal already set with Russia will allow NATO equipment to be moved directly though land into Europe, and to air bases to fly the U.S. equipment home. Nato has said that it wanted to start withdrawing its forces from Afghanistan in 2014 and the cost of the northern supply route was nearly double that of the Pakistani route, but it was cheaper than flying equipment out by air, which costs the US military $14,000 per ton.

Russia announced plans to create a NATO transit hub in Ulyanovsk in March 2012. The decision sparked protests in the city which is the birthplace of Bolshevik leader Vladimir Lenin. In late June 2012 Russia approved ground and air transit of NATO goods over its territory from Afghanistan. An order signed by Russian Prime Minister Dmitry Medvedev and dated 25 June 2012 allowed the NATO-led International Security Assistance Force (ISAF) to move their consignments, including some types of weapons and military hardware, from and to Afghanistan via a Russian base in the Airport Ulyanovsk Vostochny by rail, road and air, in contrast with the previous permission, which sanctioned only ground transit. But the order imposes a list of conditions, including customs clearance, availability of official certificates and other requirements which ensure the goods' transparency on Russia's territory. Moscow had considered allowing NATO to use Ulyanovsk Air Base only for the transit of non-lethal cargos to and from Afghanistan. The planned agreement stirred a wave of criticism and protests in Russia, with many being strongly opposed to what they consider a "NATO base" on Russian soil.

In May 2015, Russia closed a key military transport corridor which allowed NATO to deliver military supplies to Afghanistan through Russian territory.
