= Shamsi Airfield =

Shamsi Airfield Bhandari Airstrip
- IATA: none; ICAO: none

Summary
- Airport type: Government / Military
- Owner: Government of Pakistan
- Operator: Government of Pakistan (MoD)
- Location: Washuk District, Balochistan, Pakistan
- Elevation AMSL: 1,115 ft (340 m)
- Coordinates: 27°51′0″N 65°10′0″E

Map
- Location of airfield in Pakistan

Runways
Direction	Length		Surface
Direction	ft	m	Surface
04R/22L	9,883	3,012	Asphalt

Shamsi Airfield, also known as Bhandari Airstrip, is an airfield situated about 200 miles (320 km) southwest of Quetta and about 248 miles (399 km) northwest of Gwadar in the Balochistan province of Pakistan. The airfield is located in Washuk District and nestled in a barren desert valley between two ridges of the Central Makran Range approximately 21 miles (34 km) southeast of the village of Washuk.

Shrouded in secrecy, Shamsi was leased by Pakistan to the United Arab Emirates in 1992 for game hunting purposes and, between 20 October 2001 and 11 December 2011, it was leased to the United States for use as a base for joint Central Intelligence Agency (CIA) and United States Air Force (USAF) surveillance and drone operations (particularly those involving Predator drones) against militants in Pakistan's Federally Administered Tribal Areas. The United States was ordered to vacate the airfield by the Pakistani Government on 26 November 2011 after the Salala Incident in which US-led NATO forces attacked two Pakistani border check posts in Pakistan's Federally Administered Tribal Areas killing 24 Pakistan Army soldiers. The attack also led to Pakistan denying the NATO supply line use of Pakistani territory. Islamabad also rejected a U.S. offer of compensation for the killing of its soldiers in the NATO attack. The United States vacated Shamsi Airfield on 11 December 2011.

On 3 July 2012, then-United States Secretary of State Hillary Clinton officially apologized for the losses suffered in the 2011 attack. Subsequently, Pakistan allowed the NATO supply routes to resume.

== History ==
=== Lease by the United Arab Emirates (1992–2001) ===
The disused Bhandari Airstrip was leased to the United Arab Emirates (UAE) by the Government of Pakistan in 1992 for game hunting, particularly that of falconry and rare Bustards in Balochistan province, by members of the UAE royal families. The airstrip, which was renamed "Shamsi" (meaning "Solar" in Arabic) by the Emirati Sheikhs, was developed into a jet-capable airfield by the UAE.

=== Lease by the United States (2001–2011) ===
At the request of the United States, Shamsi was sub-leased by the UAE to the United States on 20 October 2001 with the approval of then-President Pervez Musharraf and was further developed jointly by the CIA and the USAF as a military airfield. The US constructed two permanent and one portable hangars at Shamsi for housing drones, in addition, to support and residential facilities, and recarpeted the asphalt runway to enable its use by large and heavy military aircraft.

On the night of 9 January 2002, a United States Marine Corps KC-130R refueling aircraft crashed after hitting a ridgeline on approach to Shamsi, possibly due to crew disorientation, resulting in the deaths of all seven crew members on board.

In February 2009, The Times (London) claimed that it had obtained Google Earth images from 2006 that showed Predator drones parked outside a hangar at the end of the runway at Shamsi. The Times investigation was in response to a statement by US Senator Dianne Feinstein that the CIA was basing its drone aircraft in Pakistan. The US company Blackwater was also reported to have a presence there, hired by the government to arm the drones with missiles. The Pakistani Government had initially denied that the airfield was being used as a base for US military or covert operations but confirmed the same later. The New York Times cited a senior Pakistani military official as saying that in 2009 the drone operations were moved across the border to Afghanistan.

=== US friction with Pakistan and eviction (2011) ===
On 13 May 2011, following the killing of Osama bin Laden of 2 May 2011, Air Chief Marshal Rao Qamar Suleman, Chief of the Air Staff, Pakistan Air Force (PAF) confirmed, in an in-camera briefing to a joint sitting of the Pakistani Parliament, that Shamsi was not under the control of the PAF, but under UAE control.

In June 2011, Pakistan publicly ordered the US to remove all its personnel from the airfield. The United States and Pakistan announced a few days later that drone operations from the airfield had actually ceased in April 2011.

On 26 November 2011, Pakistan ordered the United States to vacate the base within 15 days in response to the Salala Incident, in which US military aircraft attacked two Pakistani border check posts 2.5 km inside Pakistani territory and killed 24 Pakistani troops. Although drone operations originating at the base had ceased in April 2011, the US was apparently still using the airfield for emergency landings and logistical support.

On 4 December 2011, the first US military aircraft arrived at Shamsi to evacuate US military personnel and equipment. A total of seven US military aircraft, including C-17 Globemasters, landed at Shamsi in the coming week for evacuation purposes and US equipment and personnel were evacuated in 30 sorties. On 9 December 2011, soldiers of Pakistan's Frontier Constabulary arrived at the nearby village of Washuk to position themselves to resume control of Shamsi. All roads to and from Shamsi were closed. Some US equipment was destroyed by the US military. The US finally vacated Shamsi on 11 December 2011 with two flights carrying the remaining US soldiers and equipment. Soldiers of the Pakistan Army, the Frontier Constabulary and officials of Pakistan's Civil Aviation Authority immediately took control of the airfield. A photograph of the airfield taken on 11 December 2011 and officially released by the Pakistani military's Directorate of Inter-Services Public Relations and published in the British The Telegraph newspaper shows Pakistan Army soldiers and a Pakistan Army Mil Mi-17 helicopter at Shamsi shortly after the US vacated the airfield.

On 3 July 2012, then-United States Secretary of State Hillary Clinton officially apologized for the losses suffered in the 2011 attack.

== See also ==
- Umm Al Melh Border Guards Airport

== Sources ==
- "Pentagon investigates KC-130 crash". CNN. 9 January 2002. Archived from the original on 11 June 2009.
- Coghlan, Tom (17 February 2009). "Secrecy and denial as Pakistan lets CIA use airbase to strike militants". The Times. London. Archived from the original on 7 May 2009.
- "Shamsi, Pakistan". GlobalSecurity.org. 2009.
- Hussain, Javed (16 February 2009). "Suspected U.S. drone hits militant nest in Pakistan". Washington Post.
- Page, Jeremy (19 February 2009). "Google Earth Reveals Secret History of US Base in Pakistan". The Times. London. Archived from the original on 1 August 2009.
